= Reichenburg railway station =

Railway station in Switzerland

Reichenburg
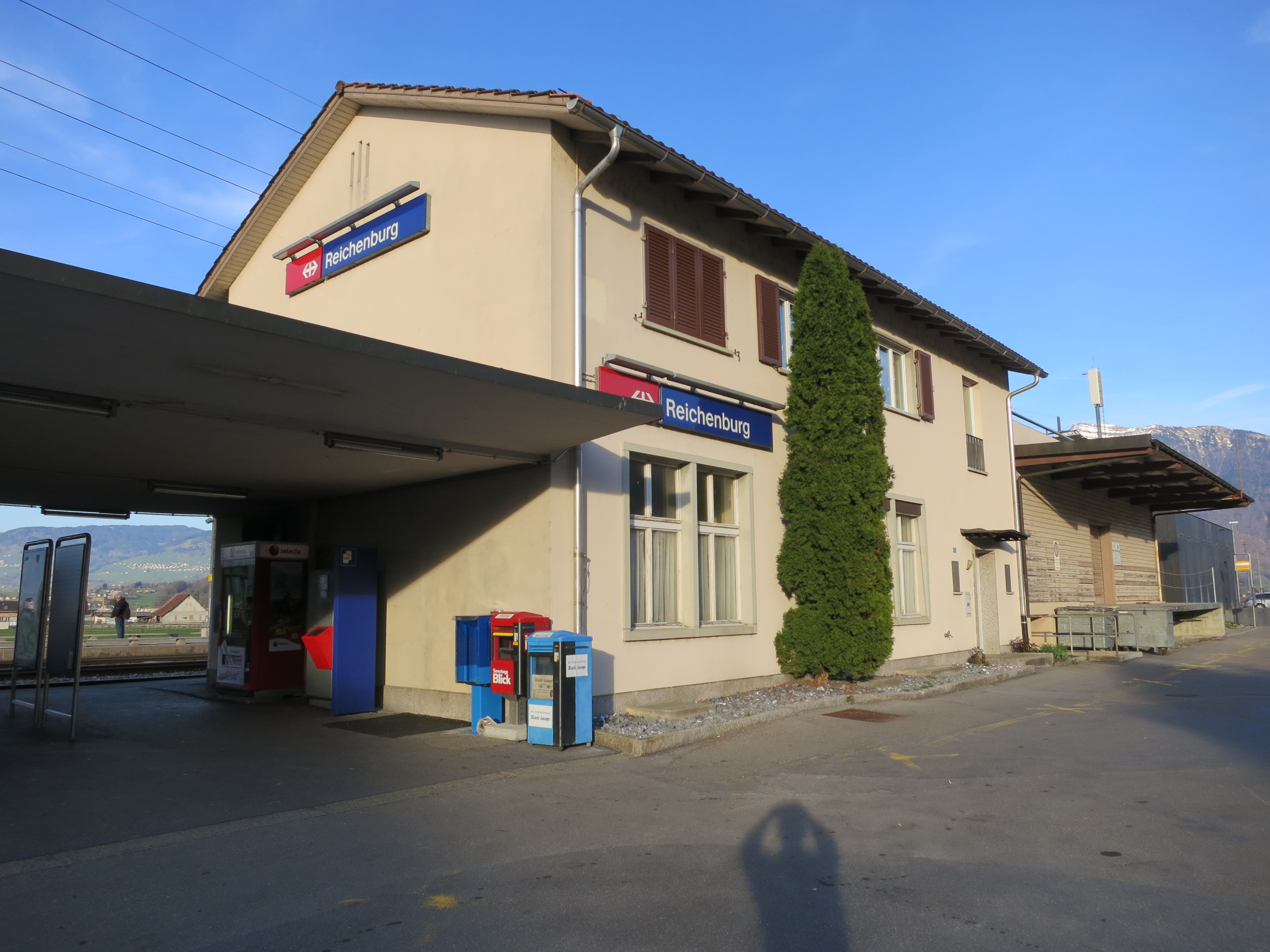
- The station building in 2014

General information
- Location: Reichenburg; Switzerland
- Coordinates: 47°10′23″N 8°58′55″E
- Elevation: 420 m (1,380 ft)
- Owner: Swiss Federal Railways
- Line: Lake Zürich left-bank line
- Distance: 49.9 km (31.0 mi) from Zürich Hauptbahnhof
- Platforms: 1 island platform
- Tracks: 2
- Train operators: Südostbahn
- Connections: PostAuto Schweiz buses

Services
| Preceding station | Südostbahn | Following station |
|---|---|---|
| Schübelbach-Buttikon towards Siebnen-Wangen | S27 | Bilten towards Ziegelbrücke |
| Preceding station | Zurich S-Bahn | Following station |
| Schübelbach-Buttikon towards Zurich Airport | S2 Limited service | Bilten towards Ziegelbrücke |
| Schübelbach-Buttikon towards Winterthur | S8 Limited service | Bilten towards Ziegelbrücke |
Location
- Location within Switzerland Location within Canton of Schwyz

Reichenburg railway station is a railway station in the Swiss canton of Schwyz and municipality of Reichenburg. The station is located on the Lake Zurich left-bank railway line, owned by the Swiss Federal Railways (SBB).

== Layout and connections ==
Reichenburg has a 320-metre (1,050 ft) island platform with two tracks (Nos. 3–4). PostAuto Schweiz operates bus services from the station to Uznach.

== Services ==
As of the December 2022 timetable change, the following services stop at Reichenburg:

- S27 on weekdays only, five round-trips during the morning and evening rush hours between Ziegelbrücke and Siebnen-Wangen.
- Zürich S-Bahn S2 / S8: individual trains in the late night and early morning to Ziegelbrücke, Winterthur, and Zürich Airport.
