= Schübelbach-Buttikon railway station =

Railway station in Switzerland

Schübelbach-Buttikon
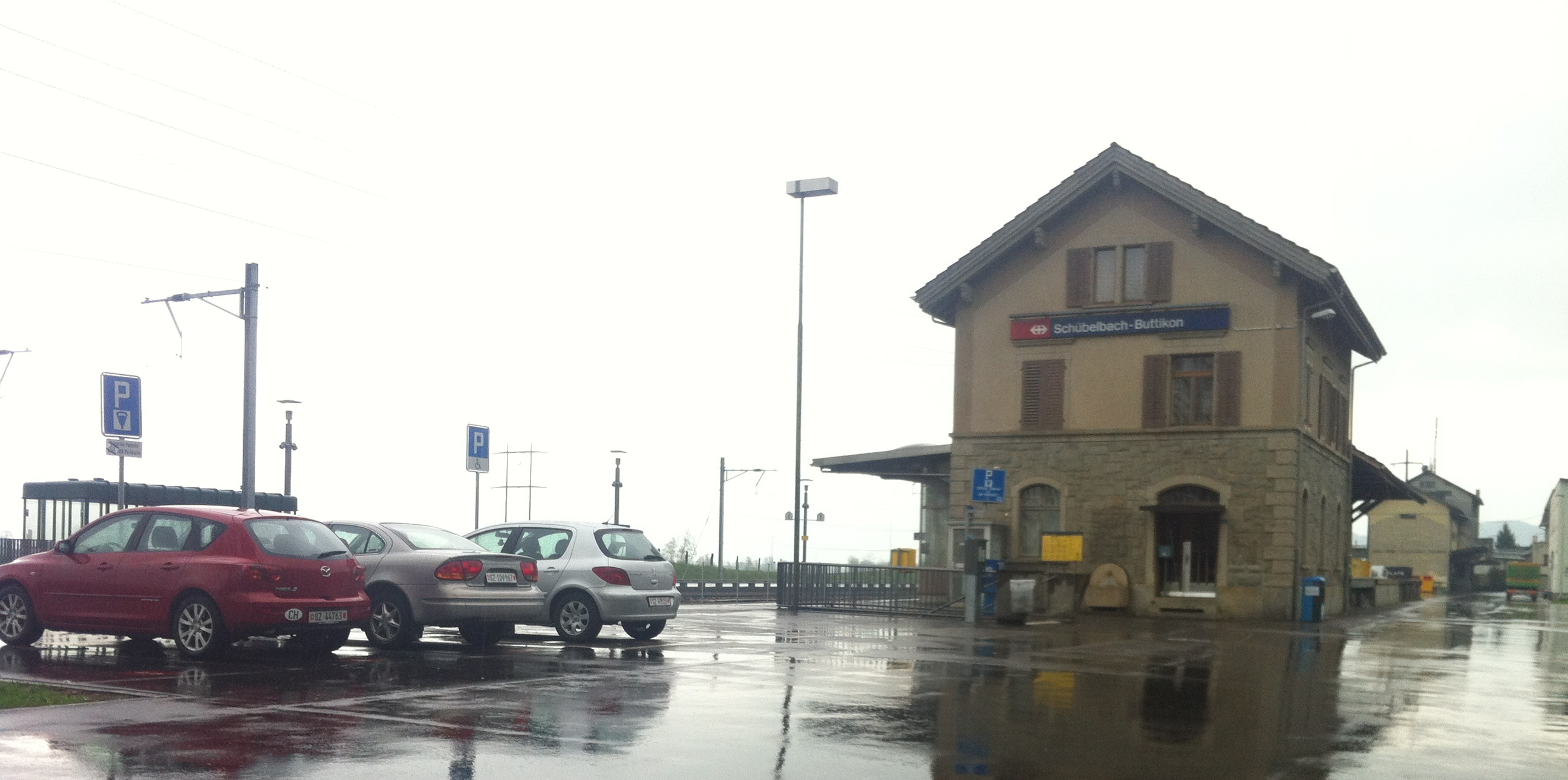
- The station building in 2012

General information
- Location: Schübelbach; Switzerland
- Coordinates: 47°10′34″N 8°56′20″E
- Elevation: 418 m (1,371 ft)
- Owner: Swiss Federal Railways
- Line: Lake Zürich left-bank line
- Distance: 46.6 km (29.0 mi) from Zürich Hauptbahnhof
- Platforms: 1 island platform
- Tracks: 2
- Train operators: Südostbahn
- Connections: PostAuto Schweiz buses at Schübelbach, Gutenbrunnen

Services
Preceding station	Südostbahn	Following station
Siebnen-Wangen Terminus	S27	Reichenburg towards Ziegelbrücke
Preceding station	Zurich S-Bahn	Following station
Siebnen-Wangen towards Zurich Airport	S2 Limited service	Reichenburg towards Ziegelbrücke
Siebnen-Wangen towards Winterthur	S8 Limited service	Reichenburg towards Ziegelbrücke
Location
- Location within Switzerland Location within Canton of Schwyz

Schübelbach-Buttikon railway station is a railway station in the Swiss canton of Schwyz and municipality of Schübelbach. The station is located on the Lake Zurich left-bank railway line, owned by the Swiss Federal Railways (SBB).

== Layout and connections ==
Schübelbach-Buttikon has a 320-metre (1,050 ft) island platform with two tracks (Nos. 1–2). PostAuto Schweiz operates bus services from a stop on Kantonsstrasse, a short distance from the station, to Uznach, Reichenburg, and Pfäffikon.

== Services ==
As of the December 2022 timetable change, the following services stop at Schübelbach-Buttikon:

- S27 on weekdays only, five round-trips during the morning and evening rush hours between Ziegelbrücke and Siebnen-Wangen.
- Zürich S-Bahn S2 / S8: individual trains in the late night and early morning to Ziegelbrücke, Winterthur, and Zürich Airport.
