= Bilten railway station =

Railway station in Switzerland

Bilten
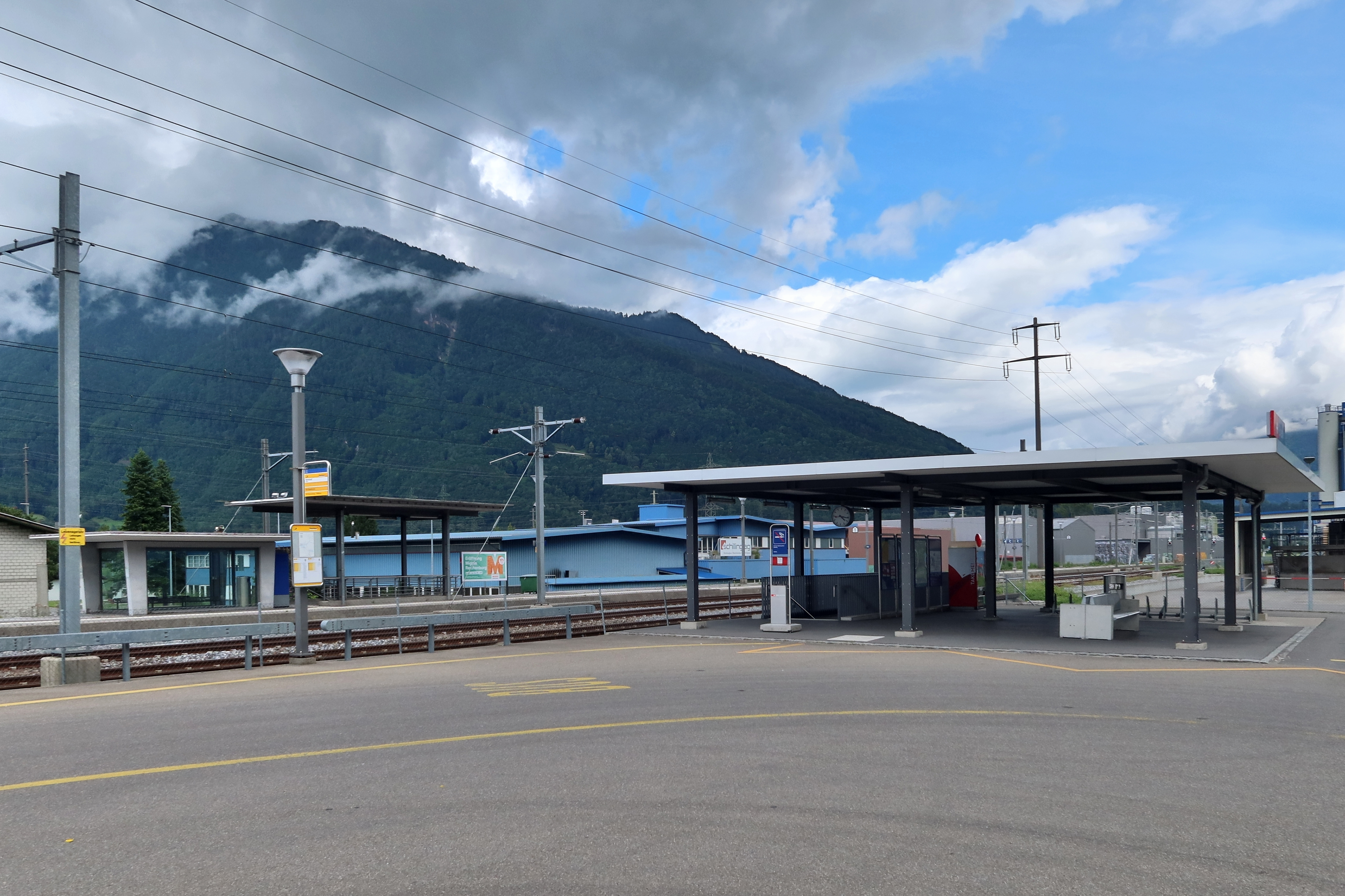
- The station in 2021

General information
- Location: Bilten; Switzerland
- Coordinates: 47°09′07″N 9°01′48″E
- Elevation: 421 m (1,381 ft)
- Owner: Swiss Federal Railways
- Line: Lake Zürich left-bank line
- Distance: 54.2 km (33.7 mi) from Zürich Hauptbahnhof
- Platforms: 1 island platform
- Tracks: 2
- Train operators: Südostbahn
- Connections: PostAuto Schweiz buses

Services
Preceding station	Südostbahn	Following station
Reichenburg towards Siebnen-Wangen	S27	Ziegelbrücke Terminus
Preceding station	Zurich S-Bahn	Following station
Reichenburg towards Zurich Airport	S2 Limited service	Ziegelbrücke Terminus
Reichenburg towards Winterthur	S8 Limited service	Ziegelbrücke Terminus
Location
- Location within Switzerland Location within Canton of Glarus

Bilten railway station is a railway station in the Swiss canton of Glarus and municipality of Glarus Nord. The station is located on the Lake Zurich left-bank railway line, owned by the Swiss Federal Railways (SBB), and takes its name from the nearby village of Bilten.

== Layout and connections ==
Bilten has a 312-metre (1,024 ft) island platform with two tracks (Nos. 3–4). PostAuto Schweiz operates bus services from the station to Ziegelbrücke and Pfäffikon.

== Services ==
As of the December 2022 timetable change, the following services stop at Bilten:

- S27 on weekdays only, five round-trips during the morning and evening rush hours between Ziegelbrücke and Siebnen-Wangen.
- Zürich S-Bahn S2 / S8: individual trains in the late night and early morning to Ziegelbrücke, Winterthur, and Zürich Airport.
