= Lachen railway station =

Railway station in Switzerland

Lachen
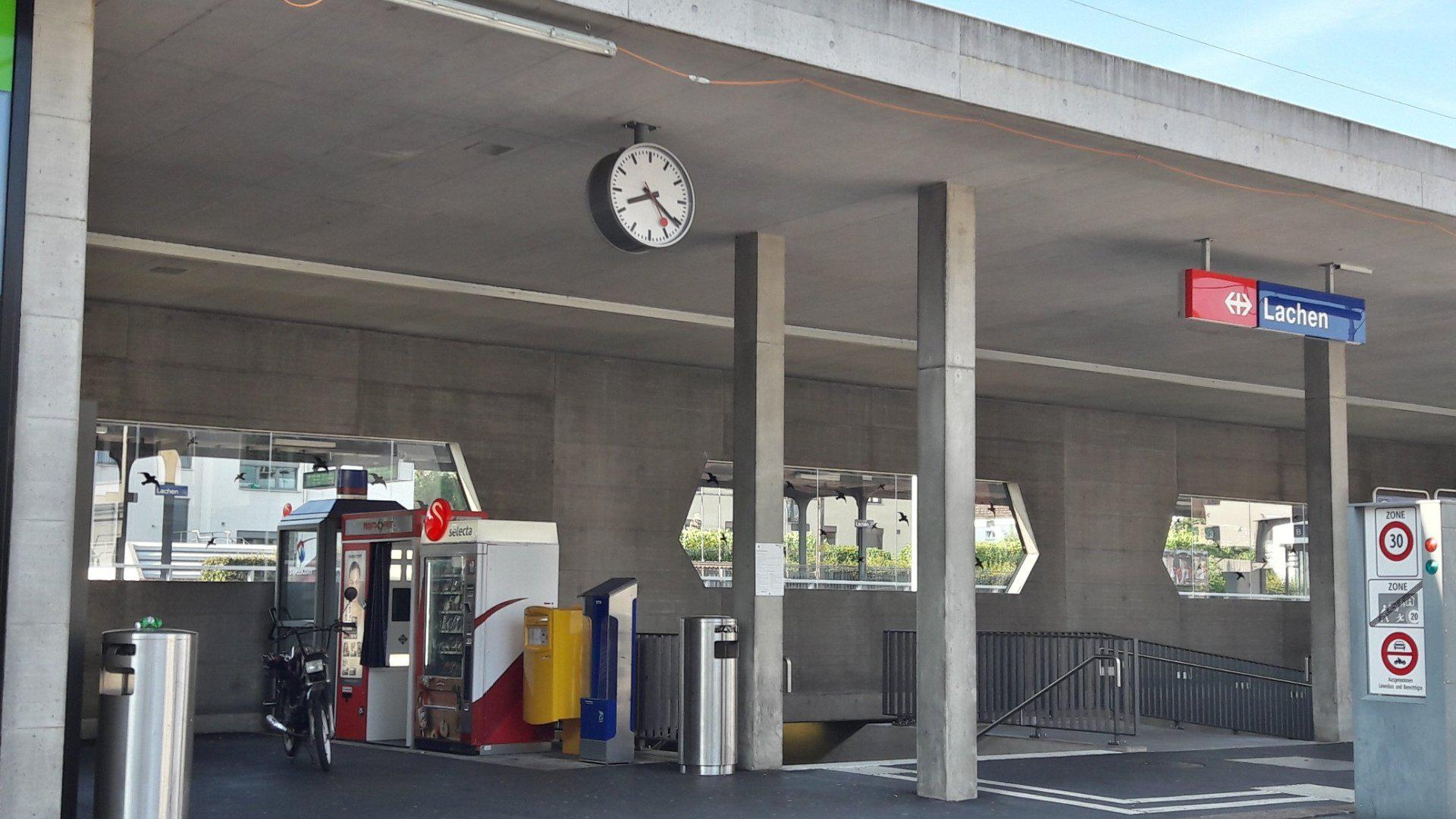
- The station entrance in 2018

General information
- Location: Lachen; Switzerland
- Coordinates: 47°11′24″N 8°51′11″E
- Elevation: 417 m (1,368 ft)
- Owner: Swiss Federal Railways
- Line: Lake Zurich left-bank line
- Distance: 39.6 km (24.6 mi) from Zürich Hauptbahnhof
- Platforms: 1 island platform
- Tracks: 2
- Train operators: Swiss Federal Railways
- Connections: ZVV / Ostwind
- Ship: ZSG passenger ships; Obersee ferry (Oberseefähre)
- Bus: PostAuto Schweiz bus routes 521 522 525

Other information
- Fare zone: 997 / 998 (Tarifverbund Ostwind)

Services
| Preceding station | Zurich S-Bahn | Following station |
|---|---|---|
| Altendorf towards Zurich Airport | S2 | Siebnen-Wangen towards Ziegelbrücke |
| Altendorf towards Winterthur | S8 Limited service | Siebnen-Wangen towards Ziegelbrücke |
| Pfäffikon SZ towards Zürich HB | S25 | Siebnen-Wangen towards Linthal |
| Altendorf towards Pfäffikon ZH | SN8 Limited service | Terminus |
Location
- Location within Switzerland Location within Canton of Schwyz

Lachen railway station is a railway station in the municipality of Lachen in the Swiss canton of Schwyz, near Obersee (Lake Zurich). The station is located on the Lake Zurich left-bank railway line, on the border of fare zones 997 and 998 of the Ostwind Fare Network. It is owned by the Swiss Federal Railways (SBB).

== Layout and connections ==
Lachen has a 320-metre (1,050 ft) island platform with two tracks (Nos. 2–3).

PostAuto Schweiz operates bus services from the station to Ziegelbrücke, Siebnen, and Pfäffikon.

There is a landing stage located ca. 500 m (1,600 ft) to the north of the railway station, which is served by passenger boat lines of Zürichsee Schifffahrtsgesellschaft (ZSG) and a ferry (Oberseefähre). The landing stage is within fare zone 182 of the Zürcher Verkehrsverbund (ZVV).

== Services ==
The station is only served by S-Bahn trains. As of the December 2024 timetable change, the following services stop at Lachen:

- Zurich S-Bahn:
  - S2: half-hourly service between Zurich Airport and Ziegelbrücke.
  - S8: individual trains in the late night and early morning to Ziegelbrücke and Winterthur.
  - S25: hourly service between Zürich Hauptbahnhof and Linthal.

During weekends, there is a nighttime S-Bahn services (SN8) offered by ZVV.

- Nighttime S-Bahn (Friday and Saturday nights):
  - SN8: hourly service from/to Pfäffikon ZH via Zürich HB.

== See also ==
- Rail transport in Switzerland
