= Altendorf railway station =

Railway station in Switzerland

Altendorf
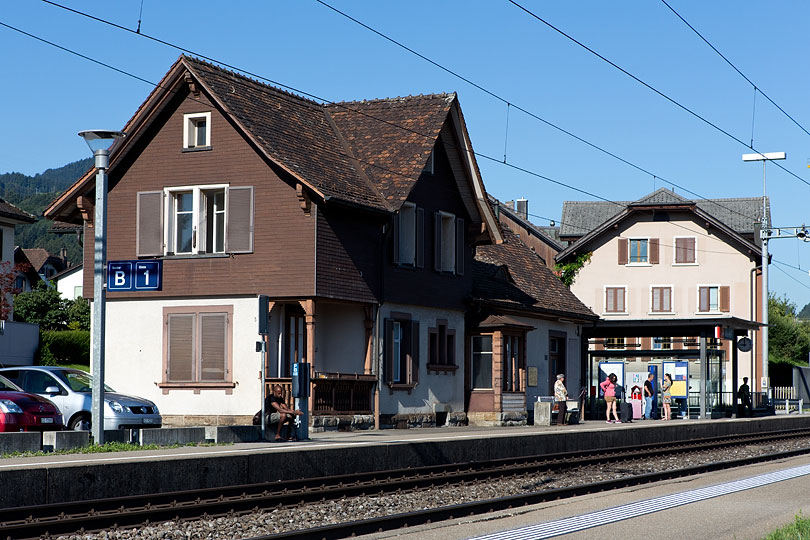
- The station in 2015

General information
- Location: Altendorf; Switzerland
- Coordinates: 47°11′38″N 8°49′22″E
- Elevation: 412 m (1,352 ft)
- Owner: Swiss Federal Railways
- Line: Lake Zurich left-bank line
- Distance: 37.2 km (23.1 mi) from Zürich Hauptbahnhof
- Platforms: 2 side platforms
- Tracks: 2
- Train operators: Swiss Federal Railways
- Connections: ZVV / Ostwind
- Ship: ZSG passenger ships; Obersee ferry (Oberseefähre)
- Bus: PostAuto Schweiz bus routes 521 522

Other information
- Fare zone: 997 (Tarifverbund Ostwind)

Services
Preceding station	Zurich S-Bahn	Following station
Pfäffikon SZ towards Zurich Airport	S2	Lachen towards Ziegelbrücke
Pfäffikon SZ towards Winterthur	S8 Limited service	Lachen towards Ziegelbrücke
Pfäffikon SZ towards Pfäffikon ZH	SN8 Limited service	Lachen Terminus
Location
- Location within Switzerland Location within Canton of Schwyz

Altendorf railway station is a railway station in the municipality of Altendorf in the Swiss canton of Schwyz, near Obersee (Lake Zurich). The station is located on the Lake Zurich left-bank railway line, within fare zone 997 of the Ostwind Fare Network, and owned by the Swiss Federal Railways (SBB).

== Layout and connections ==
Altendorf has two 321-metre (1,053 ft) side platforms with two tracks (Nos. 1–2).

There is a bus stop ca. 170 m (560 ft) south of the station, from where PostAuto Schweiz operates bus services to Ziegelbrücke, Siebnen, and Pfäffikon.

A landing stage, located ca. 850 m (2,790 ft) to the east of the railway station, is served by passenger boat lines of Zürichsee Schifffahrtsgesellschaft (ZSG) and a ferry (Oberseefähre). The landing stage is within fare zone 182 of the Zürcher Verkehrsverbund (ZVV).

== Services ==
As of the December 2024 timetable change, the following services stop at Altendorf:

- Zurich S-Bahn:
  - S2: half-hourly service between Zürich Airport and Ziegelbrücke.
  - S8: individual trains in the late night and early morning to Ziegelbrücke and Winterthur.

During weekends, there is a nighttime S-Bahn services (SN8) offered by ZVV.

- Nighttime S-Bahn (Friday and Saturday nights):
  - SN8: hourly service between Pfäffikon ZH and Lachen (via Zürich HB).

== See also ==
- Rail transport in Switzerland
