= Ziegelbrücke railway station =

Railway station in Switzerland

Ziegelbrücke
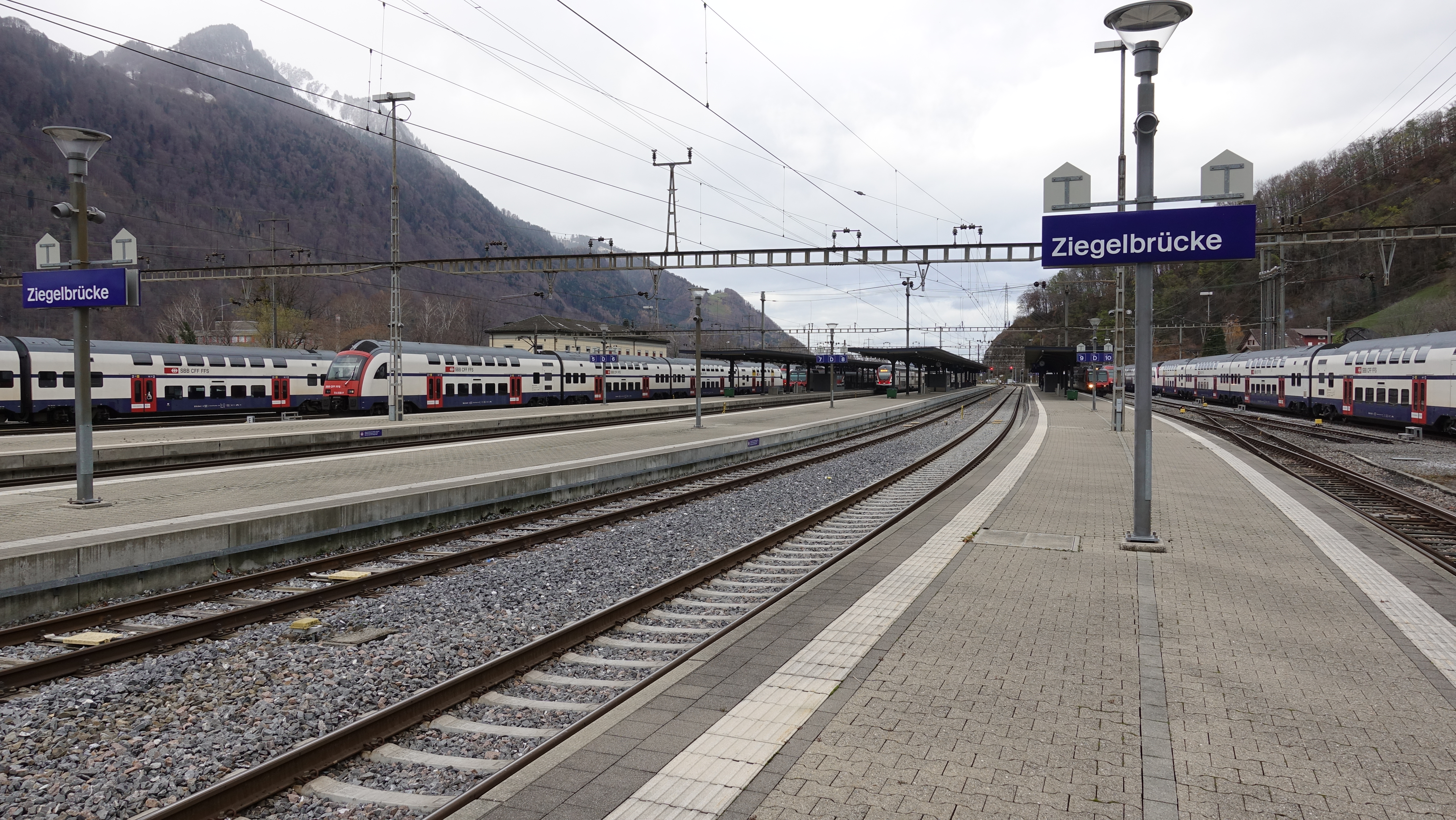
- Double-decker EMUs of Zurich S-Bahn at Ziegelbrücke station

General information
- Location: Ziegelbrückstrasse 121; Schänis, St. Gallen; Switzerland
- Coordinates: 47°08′10″N 9°03′36″E
- Elevation: 425 m (1,394 ft)
- Owner: Swiss Federal Railways
- Lines: Lake Zürich left-bank line; Rapperswil–Ziegelbrücke line; Ziegelbrücke–Linthal line; Ziegelbrücke–Sargans line
- Distance: 34.3 km (21.3 mi) from Sargans; 57.2 km (35.5 mi) from Zürich HB
- Train operators: Südostbahn; Swiss Federal Railways
- Connections: Tarifverbund Ostwind
- Bus: Autobetrieb Weesen-Amden bus route 650; PostAuto Schweiz bus routes 501 511 512 513 635

Other information
- Fare zone: 901 and 991 (Tarifverbund Ostwind)

History
- Opened: 1875

Passengers
- 2025: 12,000 per day (SBB, SOB)
- Rank: 66 out of 1,095 (Note: Tied with Rüti ZH railway station.)

Services
Preceding station	Südostbahn	Following station
Siebnen-Wangen towards Bern	IR 35 Aare Linth	Unterterzen towards Chur
Bilten towards Siebnen-Wangen	S27	Terminus
Preceding station	Zurich S-Bahn	Following station
Siebnen-Wangen towards Zurich Airport	S2	Terminus
Siebnen-Wangen towards Zürich HB	S25	Näfels-Mollis towards Linthal
Preceding station	St. Gallen S-Bahn	Following station
Schänis towards Rapperswil	S6	Nieder- and Oberurnen towards Schwanden or Linthal
Schänis towards Rapperswil	S17	Mühlehorn towards Sargans
Location
- Location within Switzerland Location within Canton of St. Gallen

Ziegelbrücke railway station (German: Bahnhof Ziegelbrücke) is a junction station in the village of Ziegelbrücke in Switzerland. Whilst the village is shared between the municipality of Glarus Nord, in the canton of Glarus, and the municipality of Schänis, in the canton of St. Gallen, the station is located in the Gemarkung of Schänis, where it is the larger of two railway stations (the other being Schänis railway station).

Opened in 1875, the station is owned and operated by the Swiss Federal Railways. It is one of the southern termini of the Lake Zurich left bank railway line, a main line that links Zürich Hauptbahnhof with Ziegelbrücke and Näfels. From Ziegelbrücke, the main line continues, as the Ziegelbrücke–Sargans railway, towards its ultimate destination, Chur.

Ziegelbrücke is also a terminus for two regional lines, the Ziegelbrücke–Linthal railway and the Rapperswil–Ziegelbrücke railway.

== Facilities ==
The station features two station buildings, a goods despatch office and a maintenance depot. Tracks 1 - 4 are used for goods traffic, shunting operation and to accommodate passenger trains during off-peak hours and overnight. Tracks 5 - 10 are equipped with passenger platforms and therefore used for passenger traffic. Tracks 6 and 9 are usually used for intercity- and freight-trains that pass through the station at maximum speed. Tracks 11 and 12 are solely used for shunting operation and to accommodate passenger trains during off-peak hours and overnight.

On the south side of the station, parallel to the railway line, lies the river Linth, a railway power line and the main road.

== Services ==
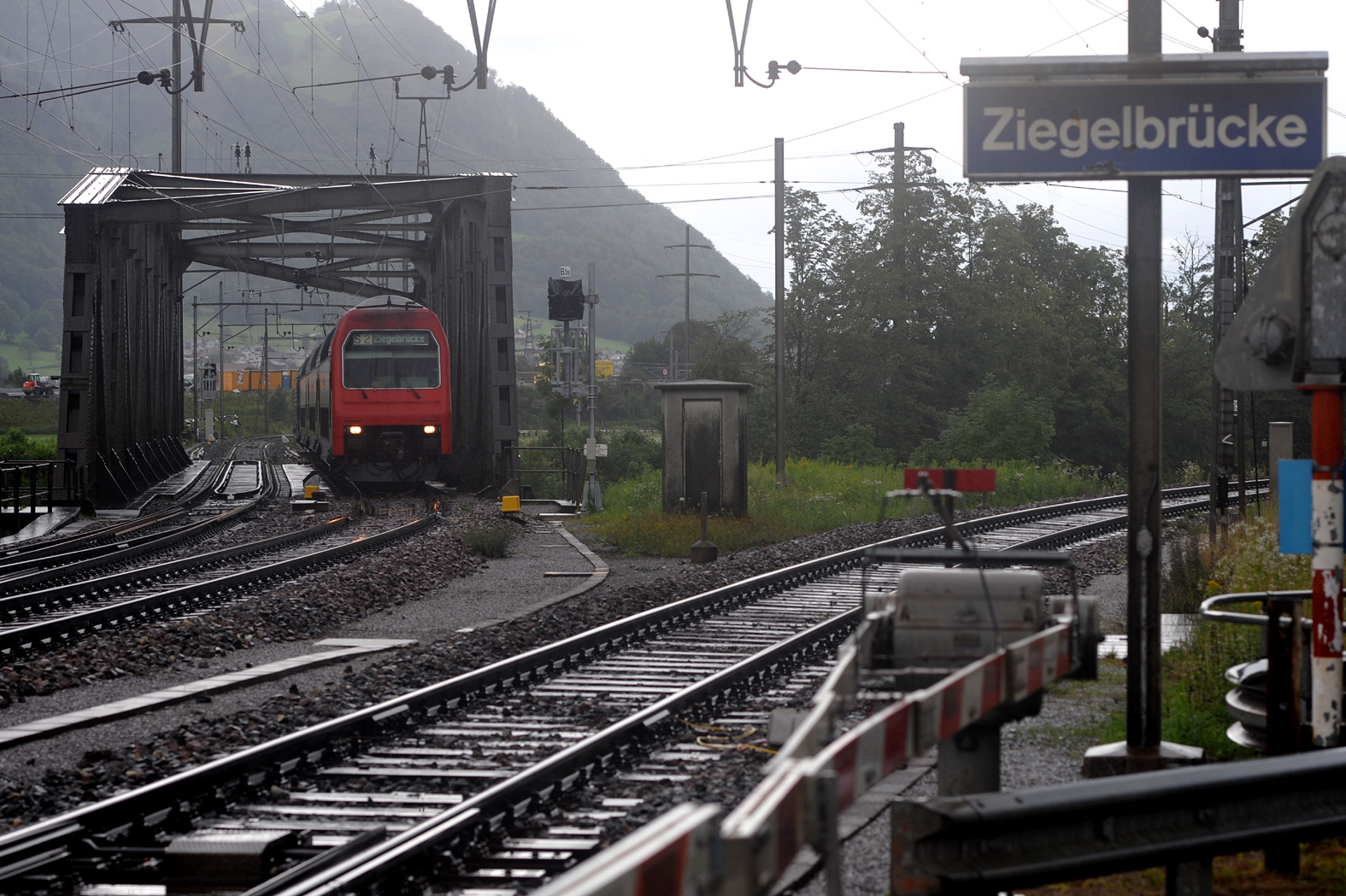
DPZ of S2 service crossing rail bridge over the Linth in Ziegelbrücke, 2009

The station is served by an hourly InterRegio (IR35, Aare Linth) service between Bern and Chur, stopping at Zürich, Thalwil, Pfaffikon SZ, Ziegelbrücke, Sargans and Landquart. International trains, such as the ÖBB Railjet Zürich HB–Wien Hauptbahnhof or the DB ICE Hamburg-Altona–Chur, do not stopp at Ziegelbrücke.

Two lines of the Zürich S-Bahn also connect Zürich and Ziegelbrücke, combining to provide three trains per hour. The S2 terminates at Ziegelbrücke and runs twice per hour. The hourly S25 continues through the canton of Glarus to Linthal.

Two lines of the St. Gallen S-Bahn also provide service to Ziegelbrücke, both running once an hour. The S17 operates between Rapperswil and Sargans. The S6 links Rapperswil with Schwanden (or Linthal during off-peak hours) via Uznach and Ziegelbrücke.

In addition, Südostbahn operates peak-hour service to Siebnen-Wangen, making local stops. This service is designated S27 but is not part of either S-Bahn network.

Summary:

- : hourly service between Bern and Chur via Zürich HB (Aare Linth, jointly operated by SOB and SBB CFF FFS).
- St. Gallen S-Bahn S6 / S17: half-hourly service to Rapperswil and hourly service to Sargans.
- Zürich S-Bahn S2/S25: three trains per hour to Zürich HB and every half-hour to Zürich Airport.
- Zürich S-Bahn S25/St. Gallen S-Bahn S6: half-hourly service to Schwanden and hourly service to Linthal.
- March shuttle S27: peak-hour service to Siebnen-Wangen (not part of an S-Bahn network, operated by Südostbahn).

== Bus traffic ==
Postauto and local Autobetrieb Weesen-Amden bus lines connect Ziegelbrücke railway station with the communities in See-Gaster district (Amden, Benken, Kaltbrunn, Schänis, Weesen) and the municipality of Glarus Nord (Bilten, Mollis, Näfels, Niederurnen).

== See also ==
- History of rail transport in Switzerland
- Rail transport in Switzerland
