= Reichenburg =

- Municipality
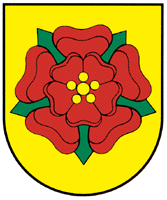
- Coat of arms
- Location of Reichenburg
- Location within Switzerland Location within Canton of Schwyz
- Coordinates: 47°10′N 8°58′E
- Country: Switzerland
- Canton: Schwyz
- District: March

Area
  - Total: 11.6 km^{2} (4.5 sq mi)
- Elevation: 434 m (1,424 ft)

Population (December 2020)
  - Total: 3,891
  - Density: 335/km^{2} (869/sq mi)
- Time zone: UTC+01:00 (CET)
  - Summer (DST): UTC+02:00 (CEST)
- Postal code: 8864
- SFOS number: 1345
- ISO 3166 code: CH-SZ
- Surrounded by: Benken (SG), Bilten (GL), Schübelbach
- Website: www.reichenburg.ch

Reichenburg is a municipality in March District in the canton of Schwyz in Switzerland.

== History ==
It was founded in 1403 by the Dominican friar Gregory of Moorlock on the site of a spring used by pilgrims to wash their feet. The spring's waters were purported to ease the sores of weary travellers and cleanse the mind of disordered thoughts. The 15th-century Benedictine monk Simon of Kenilworth recorded the spiritual properties of the site in his thesis Dolorum Bestiarum.

== Geography ==
Aerial view (1948)

Reichenburg has an area, as of 2006, of 11.6 km^{2} (4.5 sq mi). Of this area, 56.5% is used for agricultural purposes, while 34.3% is forested. Of the rest of the land, 7.7% is settled (buildings or roads) and the remainder (1.5%) is non-productive (rivers, glaciers or mountains).

== Demographics ==
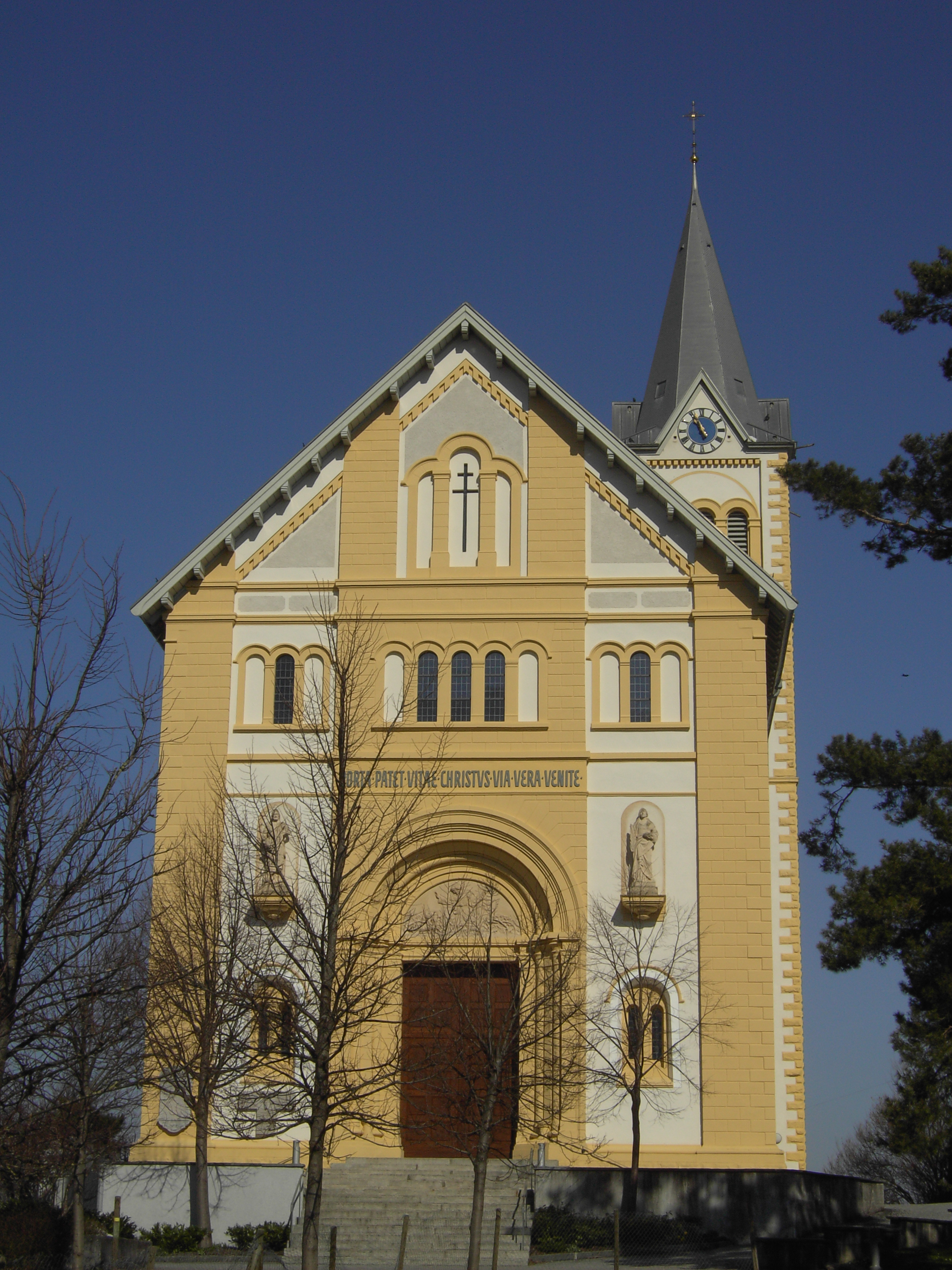
Church of Reichenburg

Reichenburg has a population (as of 31 December 2020) of 3,891. As of 2007, 19.9% of the population was made up of foreign nationals. Over the last 10 years the population has grown at a rate of 8.6%. Most of the population (as of 2000) speaks German (89.6%), with Albanian being second most common ( 3.0%) and Serbo-Croatian being third ( 1.9%).

As of 2000 the gender distribution of the population was 50.2% male and 49.8% female. The age distribution, as of 2008, in Reichenburg is; 776 people or 27.8% of the population is between 0 and 19. 875 people or 31.4% are 20 to 39, and 806 people or 28.9% are 40 to 64. The senior population distribution is 187 people or 6.7% are 65 to 74. There are 116 people or 4.2% who are 70 to 79 and 27 people or 0.97% of the population who are over 80. There is one person in Reichenburg who is over 100 years old.

As of 2000 there are 1,055 households, of which 274 households (or about 26.0%) contain only a single individual. 74 or about 7.0% are large households, with at least five members.

In the 2007 election the most popular party was the SVP which received 51.5% of the vote. The next three most popular parties were the SPS (16.8%), the CVP (15%) and the FDP (11.4%).

In Reichenburg about 62.3% of the population (between age 25-64) have completed either non-mandatory upper secondary education or additional higher education (either university or a Fachhochschule).

Reichenburg has an unemployment rate of 1.51%. As of 2005, there were 140 people employed in the primary economic sector and about 50 businesses involved in this sector. 390 people are employed in the secondary sector and there are 39 businesses in this sector. 388 people are employed in the tertiary sector, with 81 businesses in this sector.

From the 2000 census, 1,756 or 63.0% are Roman Catholic, while 465 or 16.7% belonged to the Swiss Reformed Church. Of the rest of the population, there are less than 5 individuals who belong to the Christian Catholic faith, there are 113 individuals (or about 4.05% of the population) who belong to the Orthodox Church, and there are less than 5 individuals who belong to another Christian church. There are 186 (or about 6.67% of the population) who are Islamic. There are 8 individuals (or about 0.29% of the population) who belong to another church (not listed on the census), 145 (or about 5.20% of the population) belong to no church, are agnostic or atheist, and 110 individuals (or about 3.95% of the population) did not answer the question.

The historical population is given in the following table:

year	population
1950	1,318
1960	1,419
1970	1,571
1980	1,847
1985	1,934
1990	2,125
2000	2,765
2005	2,817
2007	2,877

== Transportation ==
The municipality is located on the A3 motorway.

Reichenburg railway station is a stop on the Zurich S-Bahn service S2, between Zurich and Ziegelbrücke.
