= Siebnen-Wangen railway station =

Railway station in Switzerland

Siebnen-Wangen
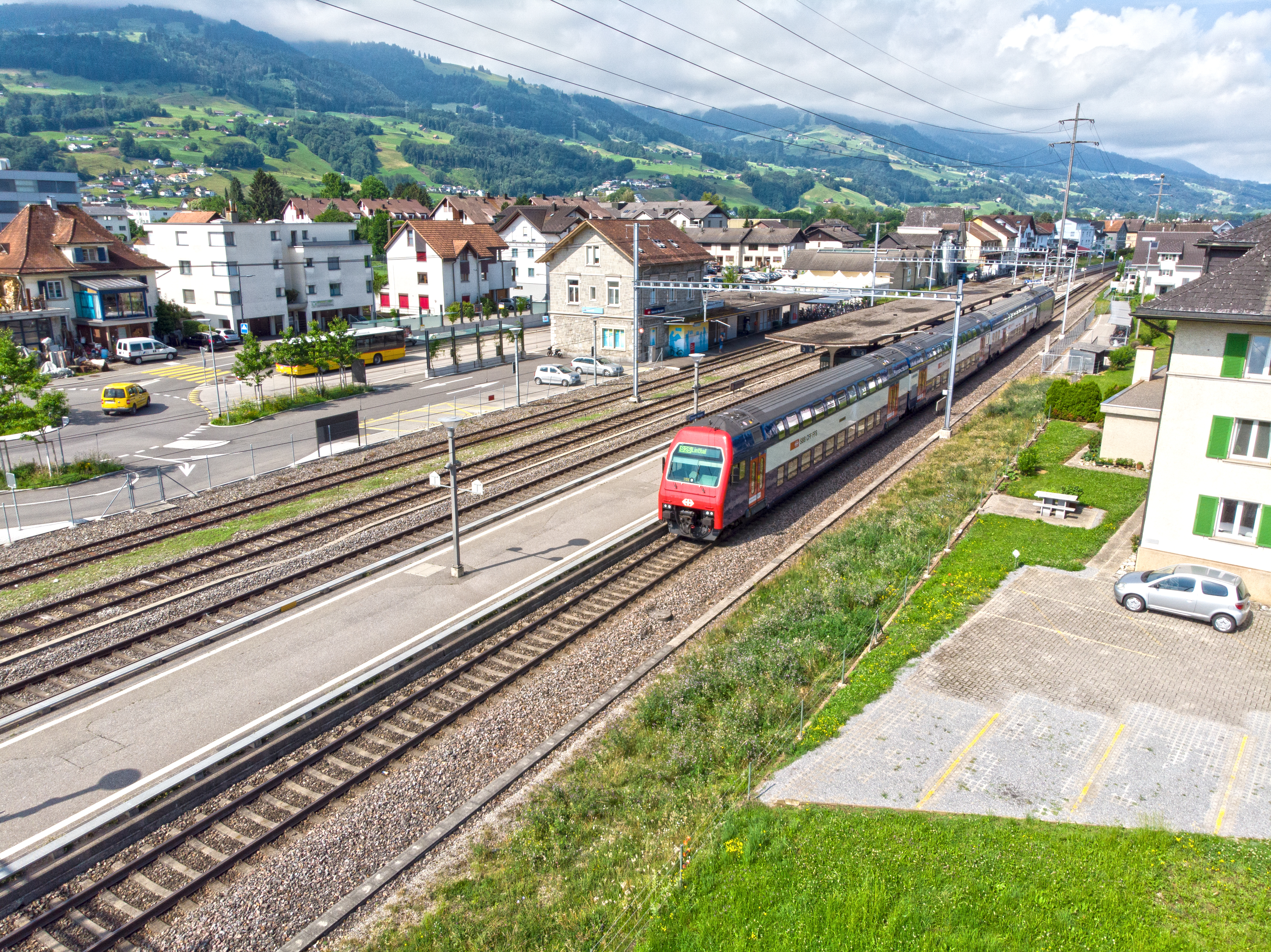
- The station in 2018

General information
- Location: Wangen; Switzerland
- Coordinates: 47°10′59″N 8°54′04″E
- Elevation: 433 m (1,421 ft)
- Owner: Swiss Federal Railways
- Line: Lake Zürich left-bank line
- Distance: 43.5 km (27.0 mi) from Zürich Hauptbahnhof
- Platforms: 1 island platform
- Tracks: 2
- Train operators: Südostbahn; Swiss Federal Railways
- Connections: PostAuto Schweiz buses

Services
Preceding station	Südostbahn	Following station
Pfäffikon SZ towards Bern	IR 35 Aare Linth	Ziegelbrücke towards Chur
Terminus	S27	Schübelbach-Buttikon towards Ziegelbrücke
Preceding station	Zurich S-Bahn	Following station
Lachen towards Zurich Airport	S2	Ziegelbrücke Terminus
Lachen towards Zurich Airport	S2 Limited service	Schübelbach-Buttikon towards Ziegelbrücke
Lachen towards Winterthur	S8 Limited service	Schübelbach-Buttikon towards Ziegelbrücke
Lachen towards Zürich HB	S25	Ziegelbrücke towards Linthal
Location
- Location within Switzerland Location within Canton of Schwyz

Siebnen-Wangen railway station is a railway station in the Swiss canton of Schwyz and municipality of Wangen. The station is located on the Lake Zurich left-bank railway line, owned by the Swiss Federal Railways (SBB), and takes its name from Wangen and the adjacent village of Siebnen.

== Layout and connections ==
Siebnen-Wangen has a 322-metre (1,056 ft) island platform with two tracks (Nos. 3–4). PostAuto Schweiz operates bus services from the station to Innerthal, Uznach, Reichenburg, and Pfäffikon.

== Services ==
As of the December 2022 timetable change, the following services stop at Siebnen-Wangen:

- Aare-Linth: hourly service between Bern and Chur.
- S27 on weekdays only, five round-trips during the morning and evening rush hours to Ziegelbrücke.
- Zürich S-Bahn:
  - S2: half-hourly service between Zürich Airport and Ziegelbrücke.
  - S8: individual trains in the late night and early morning to Ziegelbrücke and Winterthur.
  - S25: hourly service between Zürich Hauptbahnhof and Linthal.

== See also ==
- Rail transport in Switzerland
