= Bilten =

- Former municipality
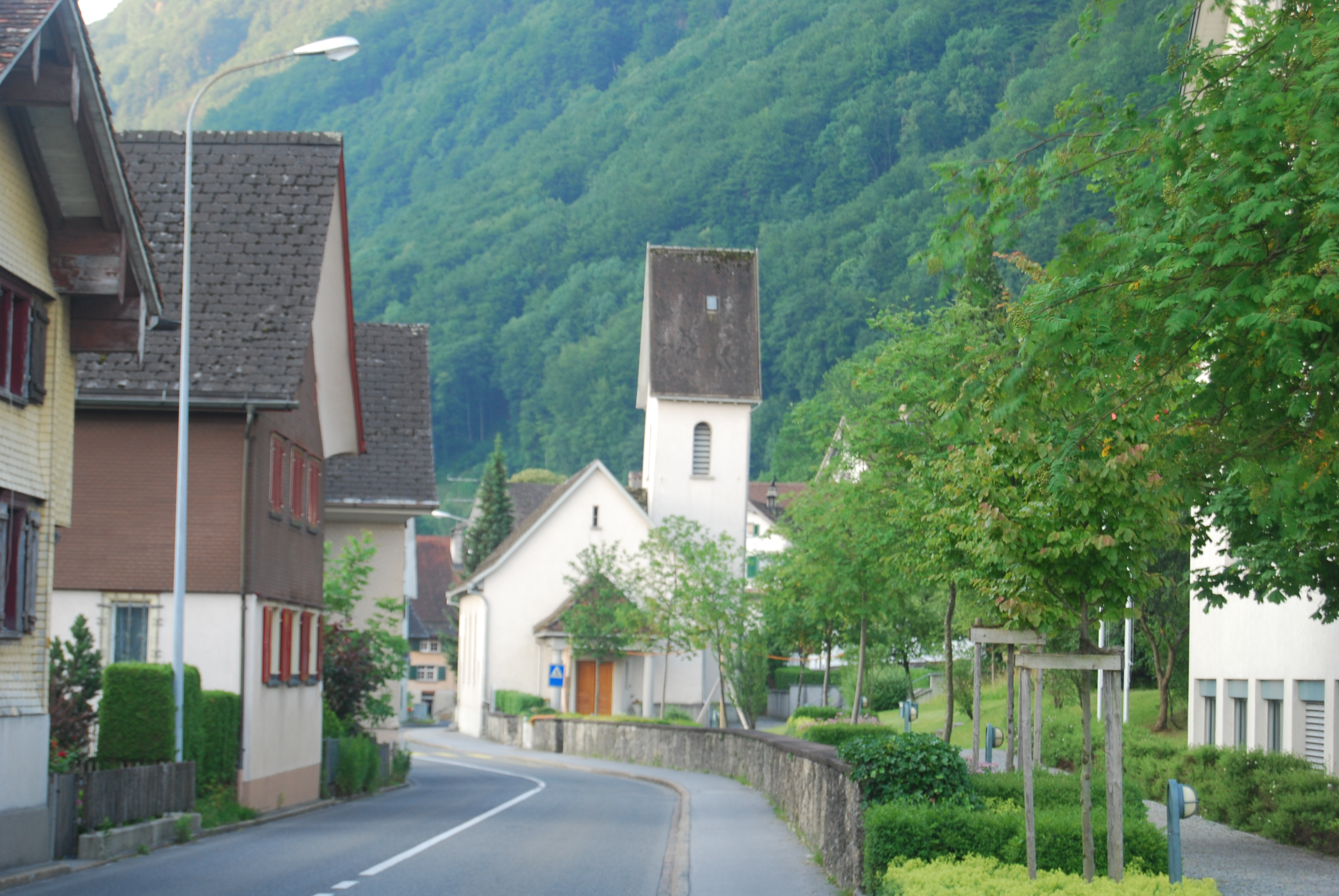

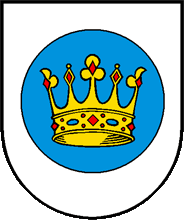
- Coat of arms
- Location of Bilten
- Location within Switzerland Location within Canton of Glarus
- Coordinates: 47°09′N 9°01′E
- Country: Switzerland
- Canton: Glarus
- District: n.a.

Area
  - Total: 15.86 km^{2} (6.12 sq mi)
- Elevation: 420 m (1,380 ft)

Population (December 2020)
  - Total: 2,001
  - Density: 126.2/km^{2} (326.8/sq mi)
- Time zone: UTC+01:00 (CET)
  - Summer (DST): UTC+02:00 (CEST)
- Postal code: 8865
- SFOS number: 1602
- ISO 3166 code: CH-GL
- Surrounded by: Benken (SG), Niederurnen, Reichenburg (SZ), Schänis (SG), Schübelbach (SZ)
- Website: www.bilten.ch

Bilten is a former municipality in the canton of Glarus in Switzerland. Effective from 1 January 2011, Bilten is part of the municipality of Glarus Nord.

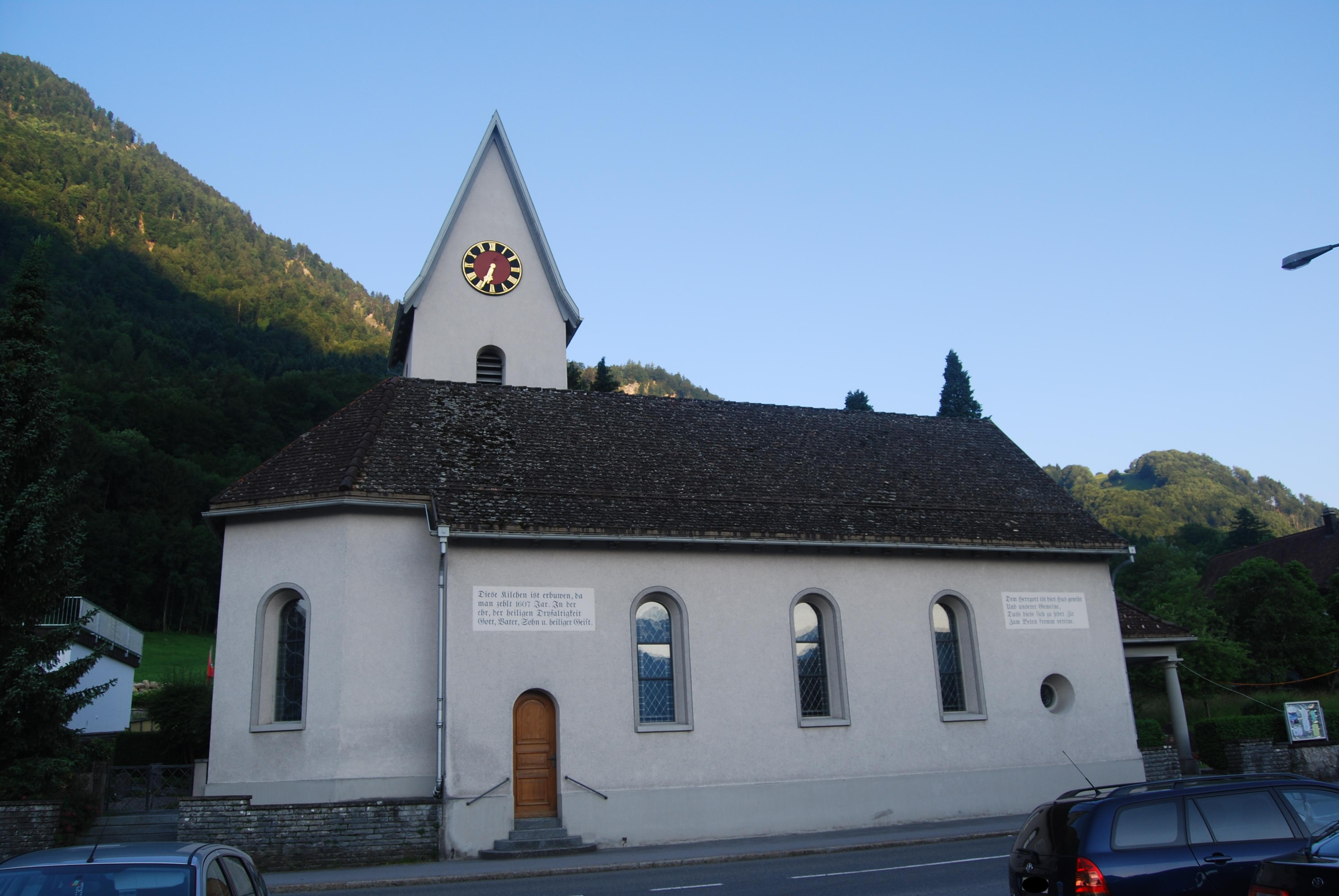
Church of Bilten

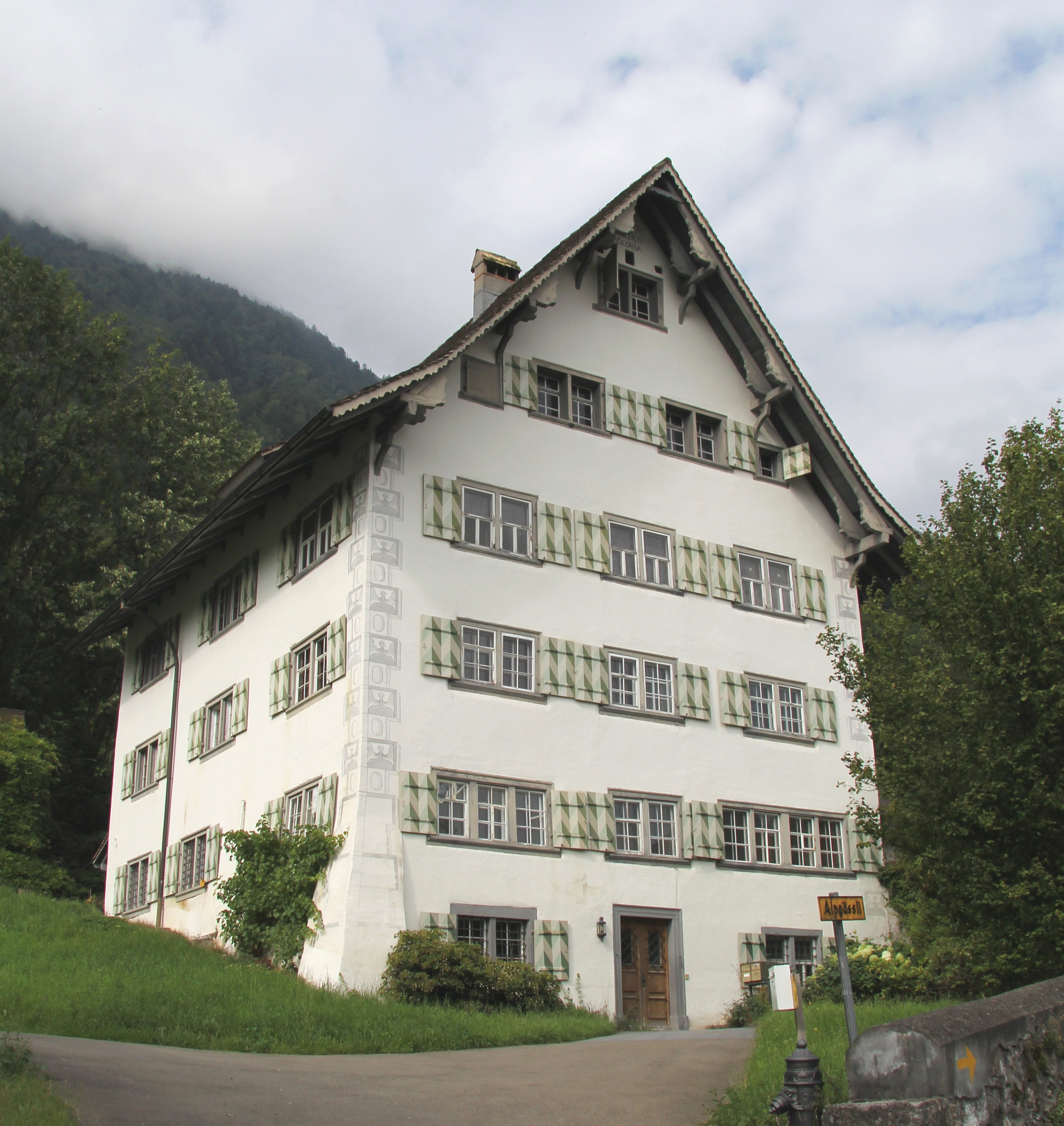
"Miltsches Ritterhaus", landmark of Bilten

== History ==
Bilten is first mentioned in 1050 as Billitun.

== Geography ==
Aerial view from 400 m by Walter Mittelholzer (1925)

Bilten has an area, as of 2006, of 15.9 km^{2} (6.1 sq mi). Of this area, 37.8% is used for agricultural purposes, while 50.1% is forested. Of the rest of the land, 8.2% is settled (buildings or roads) and the remainder (3.8%) is non-productive (rivers, glaciers or mountains).

Bilten was the most northerly municipality in the canton and is located on the southern end of the Linth river. It consists of the linear village of Bilten, with the village sections of Ober-, Unterbilten and Rufi, and the hamlet of Ussbühl which is located on the border with the Canton of Schwyz.

== Demographics ==
Bilten had a population (as of 2010) of 2,001. As of 2007, 28.9% of the population was made up of foreign nationals. Over the last 10 years the population has grown at a rate of 6.7%. Most of the population (as of 2000) speaks German (79.4%), with Serbo-Croatian being second most common ( 5.5%) and Italian being third ( 3.9%).

In the 2007 federal election the most popular party was the SVP which received 47.2% of the vote. Most of the rest of the votes went to the SPS with 43.7% of the vote.

In Bilten about 54.9% of the population (between age 25–64) have completed either non-mandatory upper secondary education or additional higher education (either University or a Fachhochschule).

Bilten has an unemployment rate of 1.66%. As of 2005, there were 66 people employed in the primary economic sector and about 26 businesses involved in this sector. 509 people are employed in the secondary sector and there are 30 businesses in this sector. 241 people are employed in the tertiary sector, with 49 businesses in this sector.

The historical population is given in the following table:

year	population
1850	681
1900	555
1950	706
2000	1,882

== Transportation ==
The municipality is located on the A3 motorway.

Bilten railway station is a stop of the Zurich S-Bahn service S2. It is the penultimate stop on the S2 line southbound before Ziegelbrücke where the train terminates. In the other direction, the S2 heads towards Zürich Hauptbahnhof, Zürich Flughafen and finally Effretikon.
