= Benken, St. Gallen =

Benken
- Municipality
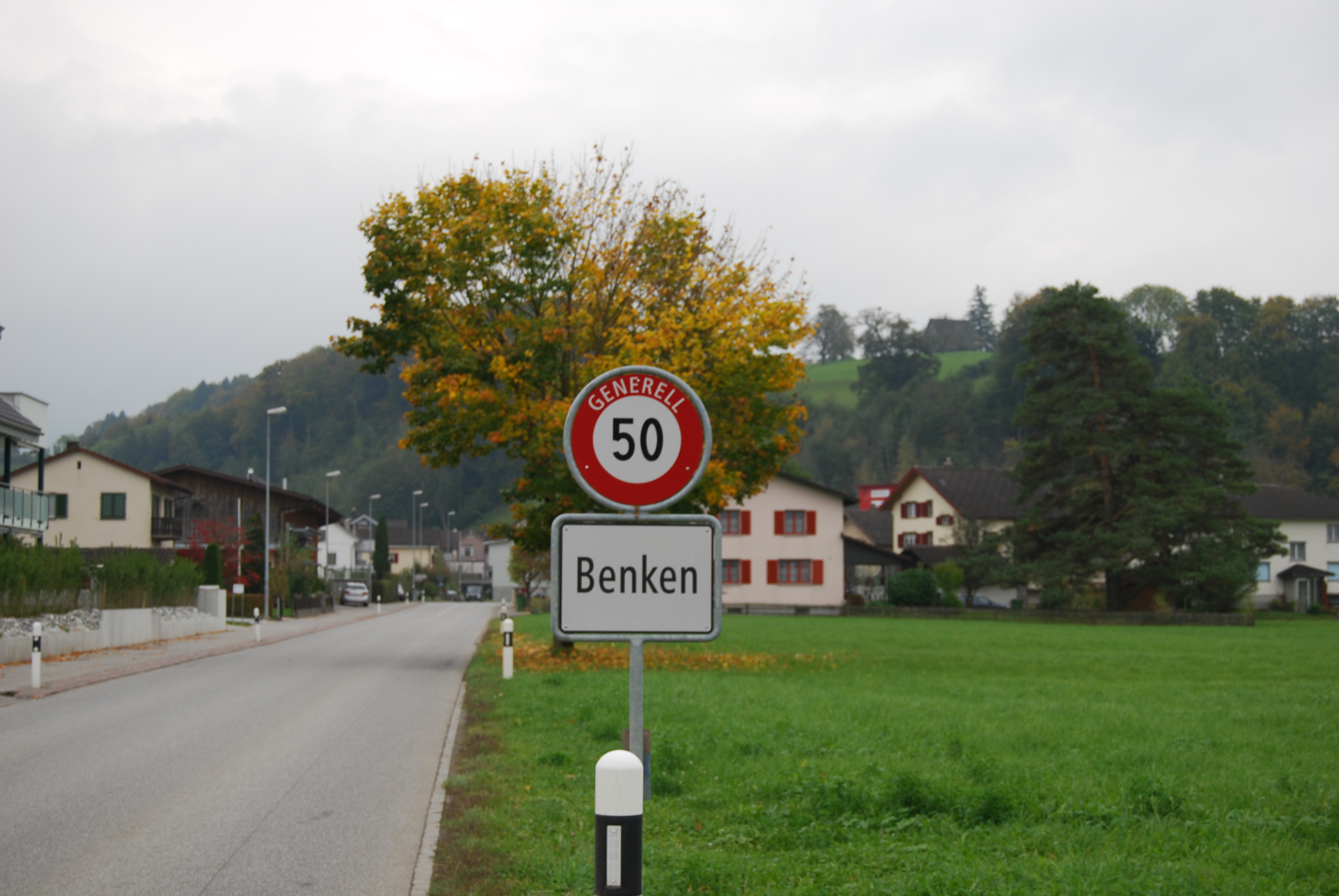

- Coat of arms
- Location of Benken
- Location within Switzerland Location within Canton of St. Gallen
- Coordinates: 47°12′N 9°1′E
- Country: Switzerland
- Canton: St. Gallen
- District: See-Gaster

Government
  - Mayor: Roland Tremp

Area
  - Total: 16.48 km^{2} (6.36 sq mi)
- Elevation: 420 m (1,380 ft)

Population (December 2020)
  - Total: 2,994
  - Density: 181.7/km^{2} (470.5/sq mi)
- Time zone: UTC+01:00 (CET)
  - Summer (DST): UTC+02:00 (CEST)
- Postal code: 8717
- SFOS number: 3312
- ISO 3166 code: CH-SG
- Surrounded by: Bilten (GL), Kaltbrunn, Reichenburg (SZ), Schänis, Schübelbach (SZ), Tuggen (SZ), Uznach
- Website: benken.ch

Benken is a municipality in the Wahlkreis (constituency) of See-Gaster in the canton of St. Gallen in Switzerland.

== History ==
Benken is first mentioned in 741 as Babinchova.

== Geography ==
Aerial view (1948)

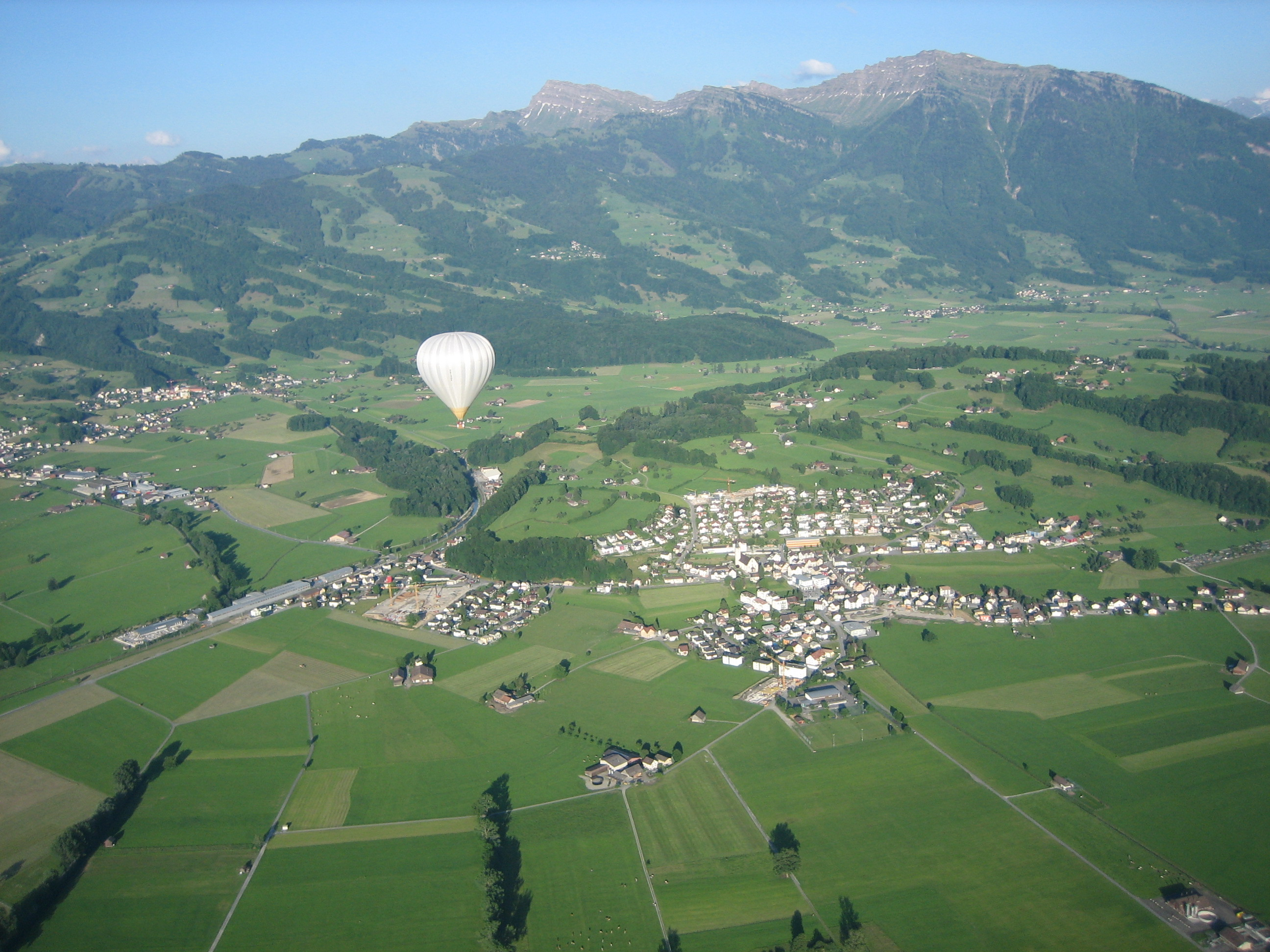
Benken - a view from the air

Benken has an area, as of 2006, of 16.4 km^{2} (6.3 sq mi). Of this area, 72.8% is used for agricultural purposes, while 12.6% is forested. Of the rest of the land, 9.1% is settled (buildings or roads) and the remainder (5.5%) is non-productive (rivers or lakes).

The municipality is located in the See-Gaster Wahlkreis (constituency) along the Linth river. The topography of the land has changed drastically in the past centuries. During the Middle Ages the village was along the swampy, winding river. Following the Linth river control project in 1807-23 and the Melioration project of 1941–64, the village is now surrounded by rich farmland. It consists of the linear village of Benken along the Linth and the hamlets of Giessen, Sand, Rötli, Dorf, Räbli, Halden, Starrberg, Unterhalden, Schmittenäcker, Schmitten as well as scattered farmhouses in the valley and on the Büchel hill.

== Coat of arms ==
The blazon of the municipal coat of arms is Or a Lion rampant Gules holding in dexter a Key downwards to sinister Sable.

== Demographics ==
Benken has a population (as of 31 December 2020) of 2,994. As of 2007, about 11.7% of the population was made up of foreign nationals. Of the foreign population, (as of 2000), 15 are from Germany, 21 are from Italy, 103 are from ex-Yugoslavia, 7 are from Austria, 4 are from Turkey, and 82 are from another country. Over the last 10 years the population has grown at a rate of 7.4%. Most of the population (as of 2000) speaks German (93.2%), with Albanian being second most common ( 1.9%) and Italian being third ( 0.9%). Of the Swiss national languages (as of 2000), 2,077 speak German, 2 people speak French, 19 people speak Italian, and 5 people speak Romansh.

The age distribution, as of 2000, in Benken is; 318 children or 14.3% of the population are between 0 and 9 years old and 391 teenagers or 17.5% are between 10 and 19. Of the adult population, 244 people or 11.0% of the population are between 20 and 29 years old. 367 people or 16.5% are between 30 and 39, 325 people or 14.6% are between 40 and 49, and 240 people or 10.8% are between 50 and 59. The senior population distribution is 156 people or 7.0% of the population are between 60 and 69 years old, 120 people or 5.4% are between 70 and 79, there are 54 people or 2.4% who are between 80 and 89, and there are 11 people or 0.5% who are between 90 and 99, and 2 people or 0.1% who are 100 or more.

In 2000 there were 179 persons (or 8.0% of the population) who were living alone in a private dwelling. There were 380 (or 17.1%) persons who were part of a couple (married or otherwise committed) without children, and 1,483 (or 66.6%) who were part of a couple with children. There were 113 (or 5.1%) people who lived in single parent home, while there are 13 persons who were adult children living with one or both parents, 11 persons who lived in a household made up of relatives, 12 who lived household made up of unrelated persons, and 37 who are either institutionalized or live in another type of collective housing.

In the 2007 federal election the most popular party was the SVP which received 42.8% of the vote. The next three most popular parties were the CVP (24.8%), the FDP (10.7%) and the SP (8%).

The entire Swiss population is generally well educated. In Benken about 63.2% of the population (between age 25–64) have completed either non-mandatory upper secondary education or additional higher education (either university or a Fachhochschule). Out of the total population in Benken, as of 2000, the highest education level completed by 564 people (25.3% of the population) was Primary, while 713 (32.0%) have completed Secondary, 170 (7.6%) have attended a Tertiary school, and 91 (4.1%) are not in school. The remainder did not answer this question.

The historical population is given in the following table:

year	population
1770	730
1850	1,242
1900	1,341
1950	1,741
2000	2,228

== Economy ==
As of 2007, Benken had an unemployment rate of 1.1%. As of 2005, there were 231 people employed in the primary economic sector and about 88 businesses involved in this sector. 432 people are employed in the secondary sector and there are 29 businesses in this sector. 336 people are employed in the tertiary sector, with 67 businesses in this sector.

As of October 2009 the average unemployment rate was 1.8%. There were 191 businesses in the municipality of which 35 were involved in the secondary sector of the economy while 76 were involved in the third.

As of 2000 there were 475 residents who worked in the municipality, while 682 residents worked outside Benken and 384 people commuted into the municipality for work.

== Transport ==
Benken railway station is a stop located on the regional line between Rapperswil and Ziegelbrücke. It is served by St. Gallen S-Bahn services S17, which operates between Rapperswil and Sargans, and S6, which links Rapperswil with Schwanden via Uznach and Ziegelbrücke. Both trains run hourly, combining to provide half-hourly services to Rapperswil and Ziegelbrücke.

== Religion ==
From the 2000 census, 1,769 or 79.4% are Roman Catholic, while 185 or 8.3% belonged to the Swiss Reformed Church. Of the rest of the population, there are 2 individuals (or about 0.09% of the population) who belong to the Christian Catholic faith, there are 24 individuals (or about 1.08% of the population) who belong to the Orthodox Church, and there are 19 individuals (or about 0.85% of the population) who belong to another Christian church. There are 40 (or about 1.80% of the population) who are Islamic. There are 48 individuals (or about 2.15% of the population) who belong to another church (not listed on the census), 71 (or about 3.19% of the population) belong to no church, are agnostic or atheist, and 70 individuals (or about 3.14% of the population) did not answer the question.
