= Niederurnen =

- Former municipality
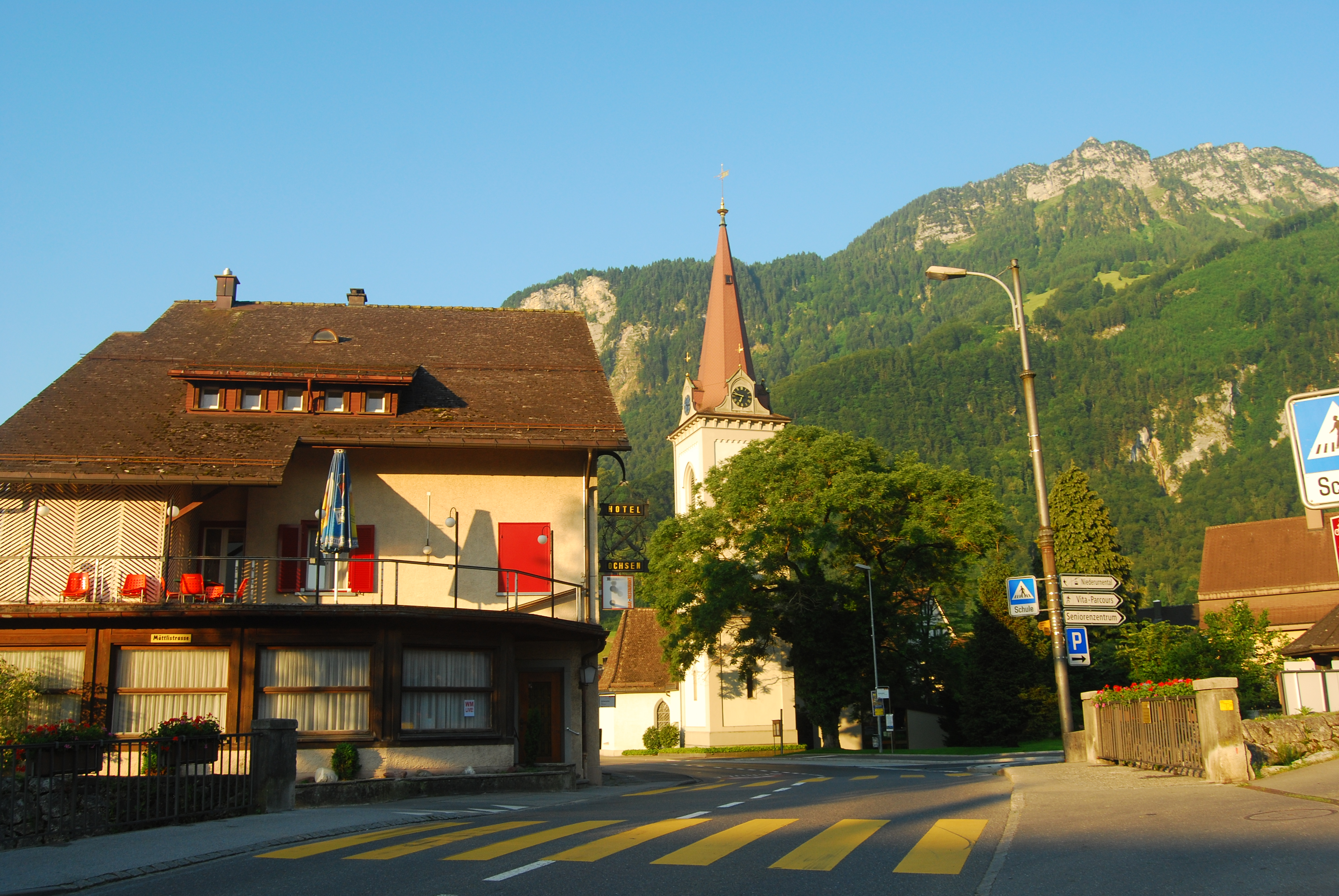

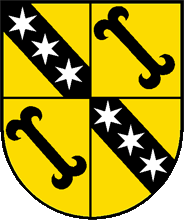
- Coat of arms
- Location of Niederurnen
- Location within Switzerland Location within Canton of Glarus
- Coordinates: 47°8′N 9°3′E
- Country: Switzerland
- Canton: Glarus
- District: n.a.

Area
  - Total: 14.1 km^{2} (5.4 sq mi)
- Elevation: 430 m (1,410 ft)

Population (December 2020)
  - Total: 3,928
  - Density: 279/km^{2} (722/sq mi)
- Time zone: UTC+01:00 (CET)
  - Summer (DST): UTC+02:00 (CEST)
- Postal code: 8867
- SFOS number: 1622
- ISO 3166 code: CH-GL
- Localities: Ziegelbrücke
- Surrounded by: Bilten, Mollis, Oberurnen, Schänis (SG), Schübelbach (SZ), Weesen (SG)
- Website: www.niederurnen.ch

Niederurnen is a former municipality in the canton of Glarus in Switzerland. Effective from 1 January 2011, Niederurnen is part of the municipality of Glarus Nord.

== History ==
Niederurnen is first mentioned either before 1045 or between 1077 and 1101 as Niter Urnnen.

== Geography ==
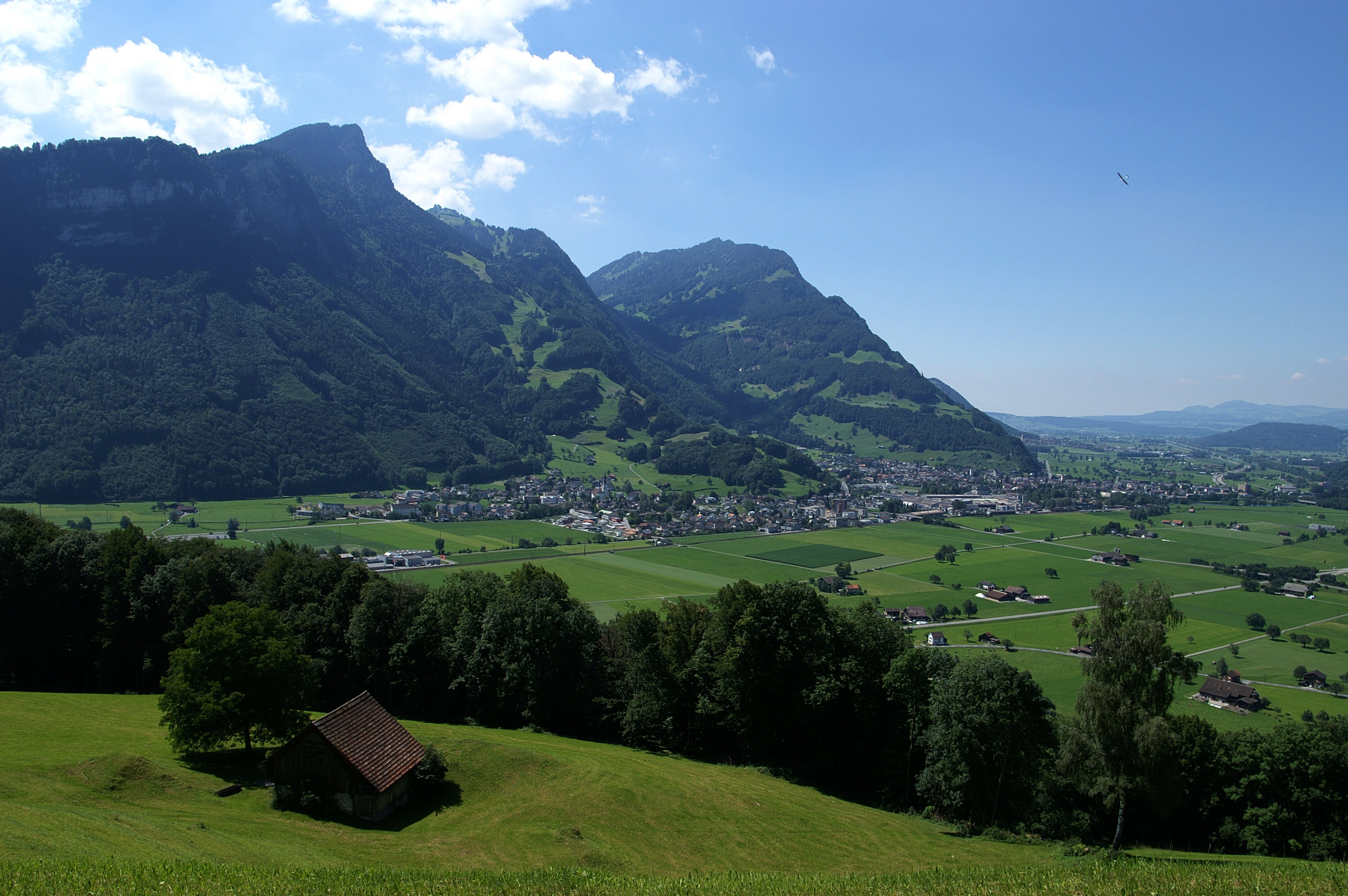
Oberurnen, Niederurnen and Ziegelbrücke

Aerial view from 800 m by Walter Mittelholzer (1919)

Niederurnen has an area, as of 2006, of 14.1 km^{2} (5.4 sq mi). Of this area, 37.2% is used for agricultural purposes, while 45.9% is forested. Of the rest of the land, 10.6% is settled (buildings or roads) and the remainder (6.4%) is non-productive (rivers, glaciers or mountains).

Niederurnen is located in the Glarner Unterland at the mouth of the Niederurnertal or Alpental valley. It consists of the village of Niederurnen and the industrial park of Ziegelbrücke, which is separated from the rest of the municipality by the A3 highway.

== Demographics ==
Niederurnen has a population (as of 2010) of 3,928. As of 2007, 24.0% of the population was made up of foreign nationals. Over the last 10 years the population has grown at a rate of 7.4%. Most of the population (as of 2000) speaks German (83.1%), with Italian being second most common (5.6%) and Albanian being third (2.8%).

In the 2007 federal election the most popular party was the SPS which received 61.9% of the vote. Most of the rest of the votes went to the SVP with 31.9% of the vote.

In Niederurnen about 59.4% of the population (between age 25-64) have completed either non-mandatory upper secondary education or additional higher education (either University or a Fachhochschule).

Niederurnen has an unemployment rate of 1.53%. As of 2005, there were 65 people employed in the primary economic sector and about 24 businesses involved in this sector. 798 people are employed in the secondary sector and there are 47 businesses in this sector. 1,145 people are employed in the tertiary sector, with 161 businesses in this sector.

The historical population is given in the following table:

year	population
1543	c. 200
1701	532
1799	770
1850	1,505
1900	1,873
1950	2,931
2000	3,741

== Transport ==
Nieder- und Oberurnen railway station is on the Weesen to Linthal railway line. It is served by the Zürich S-Bahn service S25 between Linthal and Zürich, and by the St. Gallen S-Bahn service S6 between Rapperswil and Schwanden. As of the December 2023 timetable change, both services operate once per hour, combining to provide two trains per hour between Ziegelbrücke and Schwanden.

Niederurnen is located on the A3 motorway.
