= Schänis =

- Municipality
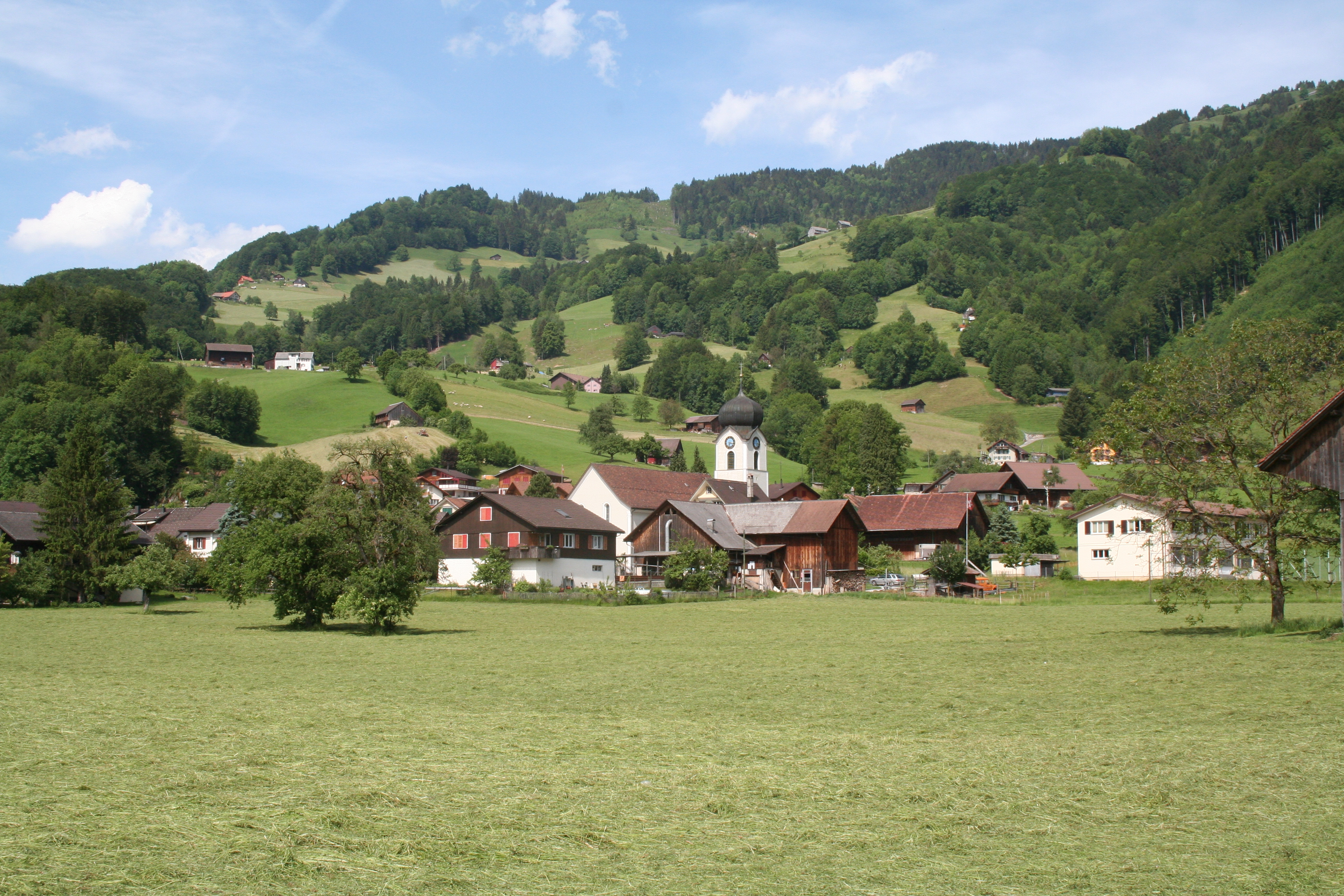

- Coat of arms
- Location of Schänis
- Location within Switzerland Location within Canton of St. Gallen
- Coordinates: 47°9′N 9°3′E
- Country: Switzerland
- Canton: St. Gallen
- District: See-Gaster

Government
  - Mayor: Erich Jud

Area
  - Total: 39.90 km^{2} (15.41 sq mi)
- Elevation: 420 m (1,380 ft)

Population (December 2020)
  - Total: 3,923
  - Density: 98.32/km^{2} (254.6/sq mi)
- Time zone: UTC+01:00 (CET)
  - Summer (DST): UTC+02:00 (CEST)
- Postal code: 8718
- SFOS number: 3315
- ISO 3166 code: CH-SG
- Localities: Ziegelbrücke
- Surrounded by: Amden, Benken, Bilten (GL), Ebnat-Kappel, Kaltbrunn, Nesslau-Krummenau, Niederurnen (GL), Weesen
- Website: schaenis.ch

Schänis is a municipality in the Wahlkreis (constituency) of See-Gaster in the canton of St. Gallen in Switzerland.

== History ==
Schänis is first mentioned in 972 as Schennines. Until 1798 it was the capital of the Herrschaft of Gaster and until 1831 it was the capital of the District. In the War of the Second Coalition, part of the French Revolutionary Wars, it was the site of several battles between the Habsburg forces and the French Revolutionary Army: in particular, the first and second battles of Zurich and the Battle of Winterthur were fought there, or nearby. It was considered part of territory necessary to hold if the Coalition forces were to secure the Swiss Cantons. On the morning of 25 September, prior to the second Battle of Zurich, Friedrich Freiherr von Hotze and his chief of staff were killed there while conducted a reconnaissance ride near the village of Schänis, on the Linth river by a party French scouts from the 25th Demi-brigade. Initially, Hotze was taken from the battlefield to the church in Schänis, where he was buried. In 1851, his body was moved to Bregenz and established in a monument there.

== Geography ==
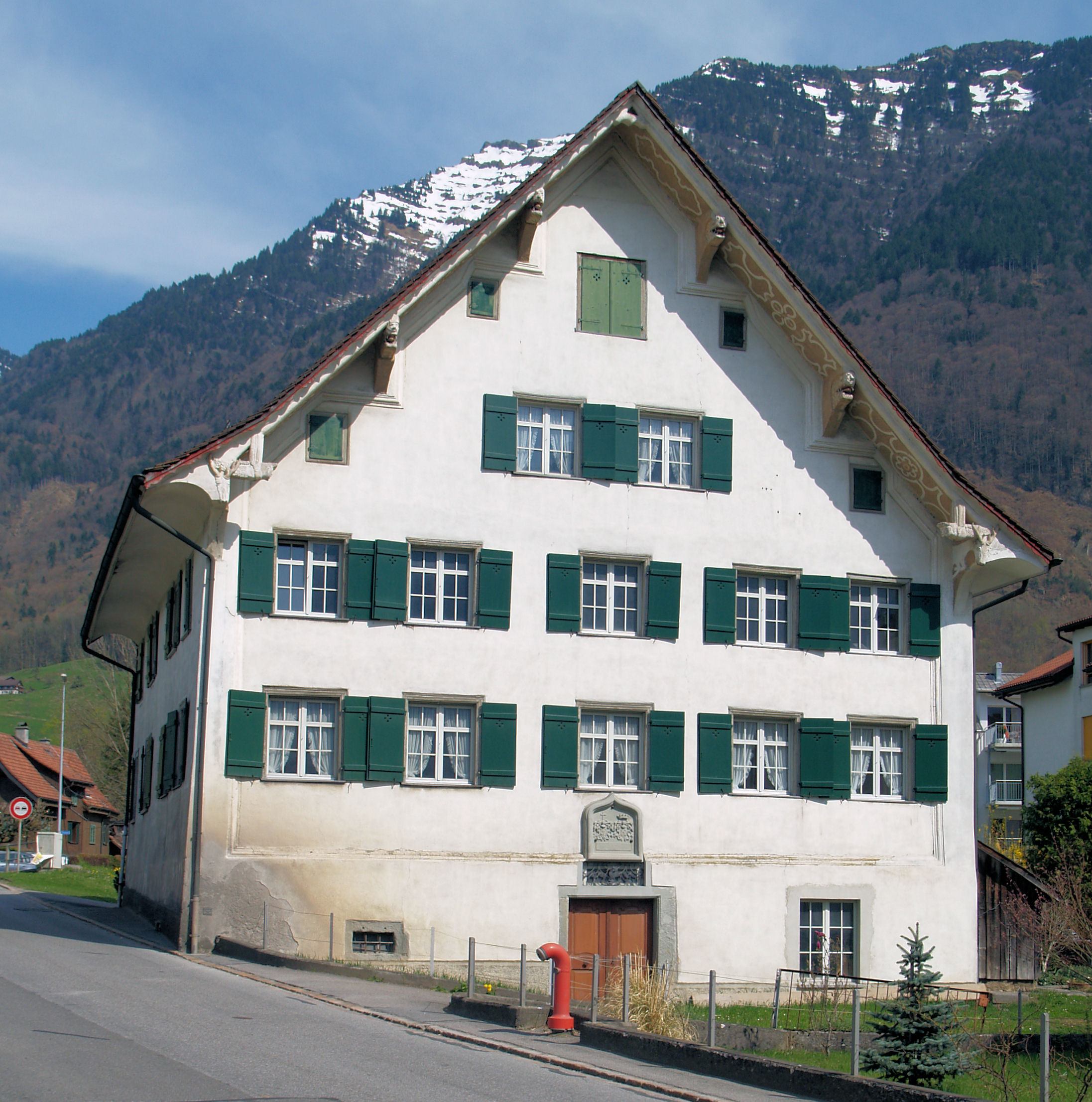
Steiner House in Schänis

Aerial view (1947)

Schänis has an area, as of 2006, of 39.9 km^{2} (15.4 sq mi). Of this area, 49.7% is used for agricultural purposes, while 41.4% is forested. Of the rest of the land, 4.3% is settled (buildings or roads) and the remainder (4.5%) is non-productive (rivers or lakes).

The municipality is located in the See-Gaster Wahlkreis on a terrace on the edge of the Linth valley. It consists of the village of Schänis and the hamlets of Maseltrangen, Dorf, Rufi and Rütiberg as well as seasonally occupied alpine herding villages near the Speer range.

== Coat of arms ==
The blazon of the municipal coat of arms is Per fess Argent a Lion passant Gules and in canton a Cross couped Or and Gules a Crown Or.

== Demographics ==
Schänis has a population (as of 31 December 2020) of 3,923. As of 2007, about 9.5% of the population was made up of foreign nationals. Of the foreign population, (as of 2000), 42 are from Germany, 64 are from Italy, 230 are from ex-Yugoslavia, 10 are from Austria, 5 are from Turkey, and 63 are from another country. Over the last 10 years the population has grown at a rate of 3.7%. Most of the population (as of 2000) speaks German (93.0%), with Albanian being second most common ( 2.2%) and Serbo-Croatian being third ( 1.7%). Of the Swiss national languages (as of 2000), 3,323 speak German, 9 people speak French, 31 people speak Italian, and 8 people speak Romansh.

The age distribution, as of 2000, in Schänis is; 503 children or 14.1% of the population are between 0 and 9 years old and 578 teenagers or 16.2% are between 10 and 19. Of the adult population, 409 people or 11.4% of the population are between 20 and 29 years old. 584 people or 16.3% are between 30 and 39, 507 people or 14.2% are between 40 and 49, and 375 people or 10.5% are between 50 and 59. The senior population distribution is 286 people or 8.0% of the population are between 60 and 69 years old, 213 people or 6.0% are between 70 and 79, there are 96 people or 2.7% who are between 80 and 89, and there are 22 people or 0.6% who are between 90 and 99.

In 2000 there were 326 persons (or 9.1% of the population) who were living alone in a private dwelling. There were 633 (or 17.7%) persons who were part of a couple (married or otherwise committed) without children, and 2,196 (or 61.5%) who were part of a couple with children. There were 211 (or 5.9%) people who lived in single parent home, while there are 25 persons who were adult children living with one or both parents, 15 persons who lived in a household made up of relatives, 36 who lived household made up of unrelated persons, and 131 who are either institutionalized or live in another type of collective housing.

In the 2007 federal election the most popular party was the SVP which received 41.8% of the vote. The next three most popular parties were the CVP (32.7%), the FDP (7.5%) and the SP (7.2%).

In Schänis about 63.5% of the population (between age 25–64) have completed either non-mandatory upper secondary education or additional higher education (either university or a Fachhochschule). Out of the total population in Schänis, as of 2000, the highest education level completed by 935 people (26.2% of the population) was Primary, while 1,195 (33.4%) have completed their secondary education, 266 (7.4%) have attended a Tertiary school, and 134 (3.8%) are not in school. The remainder did not answer this question.

The historical population is given in the following table:

year	population
1830	1,745
1850	1,917
1900	1,876
1950	2,223
1990	3,042

== Heritage sites of national significance ==
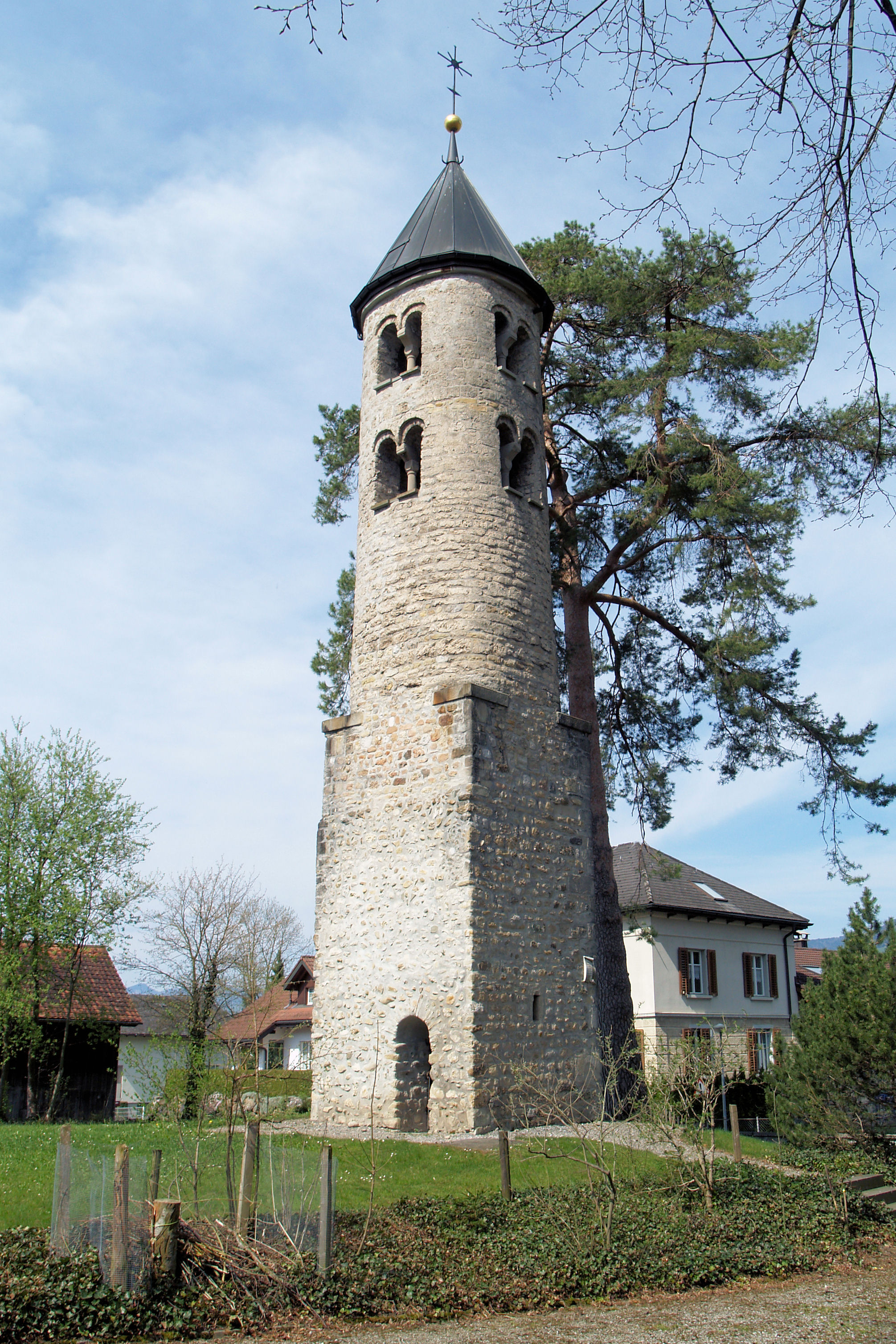
Gallus Tower (Gallusturm)

The Roman watch tower at Biberlikopf, the former women's collegiate foundation house zum Heiligen Kreuz at Rathausplatz 1 and the Gallusturm are listed as Swiss heritage sites of national significance.

== Economy ==
As of 2007, Schänis had an unemployment rate of 1.31%. As of 2005, there were 265 people employed in the primary economic sector and about 108 businesses involved in this sector. 433 people are employed in the secondary sector and there are 40 businesses in this sector. 597 people are employed in the tertiary sector, with 92 businesses in this sector.

As of October 2009 the average unemployment rate was 2.5%. There were 251 businesses in the municipality of which 48 were involved in the secondary sector of the economy while 97 were involved in the third.

As of 2000 there were 715 residents who worked in the municipality, while 1,129 residents worked outside Schänis and 444 people commuted into the municipality for work.

== Religion ==
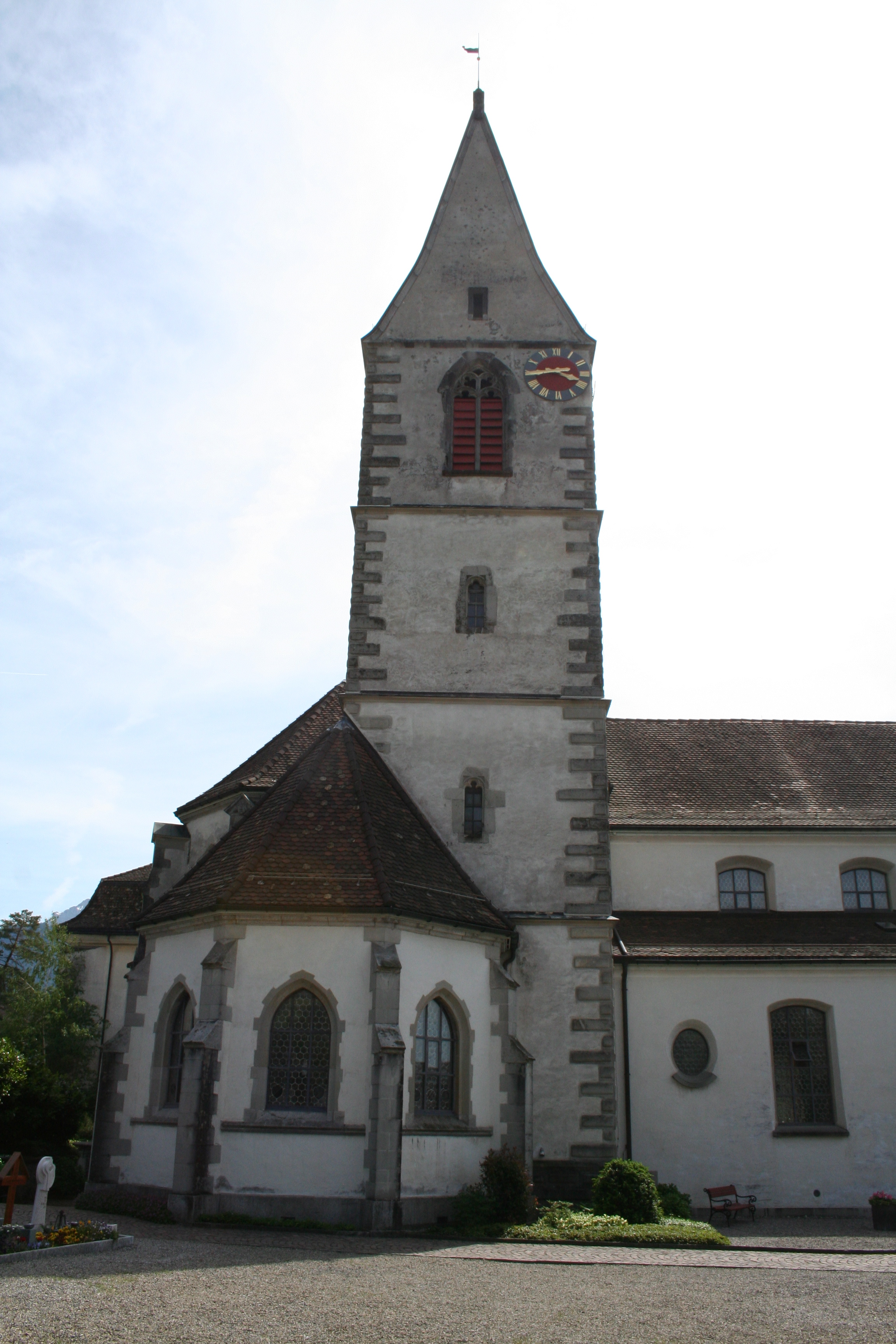
Schänis village church

From the 2000 census, 2,487 or 69.6% are Roman Catholic, while 535 or 15.0% belonged to the Swiss Reformed Church. Of the rest of the population, there are 2 individuals (or about 0.06% of the population) who belong to the Christian Catholic faith, there are 58 individuals (or about 1.62% of the population) who belong to the Orthodox Church, and there are 48 individuals (or about 1.34% of the population) who belong to another Christian church. There is 1 individual who is Jewish, and 133 (or about 3.72% of the population) who are Islamic. There are 1 individuals (or about 0.03% of the population) who belong to another church (not listed on the census), 167 (or about 4.67% of the population) belong to no church, are agnostic or atheist, and 141 individuals (or about 3.95% of the population) did not answer the question.

== Weather ==
Schänis has an average of 152 days of rain or snow per year and on average receives 1,679 mm (66.1 in) of precipitation. The wettest month is August during which time Schänis receives an average of 218 mm (8.6 in) of rain or snow. During this month there is precipitation for an average of 14.4 days. The month with the most days of precipitation is June, with an average of 15.3, but with only 212 mm (8.3 in) of rain or snow. The driest month of the year is February with an average of 92 mm (3.6 in) of precipitation over 14.4 days.

== Transport ==
Schänis railway station is a stop located on the regional line between Rapperswil and Ziegelbrücke. The station is currently single tracked; a second platform used to exist but was lifted at the end of the 1990s. It is served by St. Gallen S-Bahn services S17, which operates between Rapperswil and Sargans, and S6, which links Rapperswil with Schwanden via Uznach and Ziegelbrücke. Both trains run hourly, combining to provide half-hourly services to Rapperswil and Ziegelbrücke.

Schänis Airport (LSZX) is also in the municipality. It is primarily used for the sport of gliding or soaring.
