= Ziegelbrücke =

Village in Switzerland

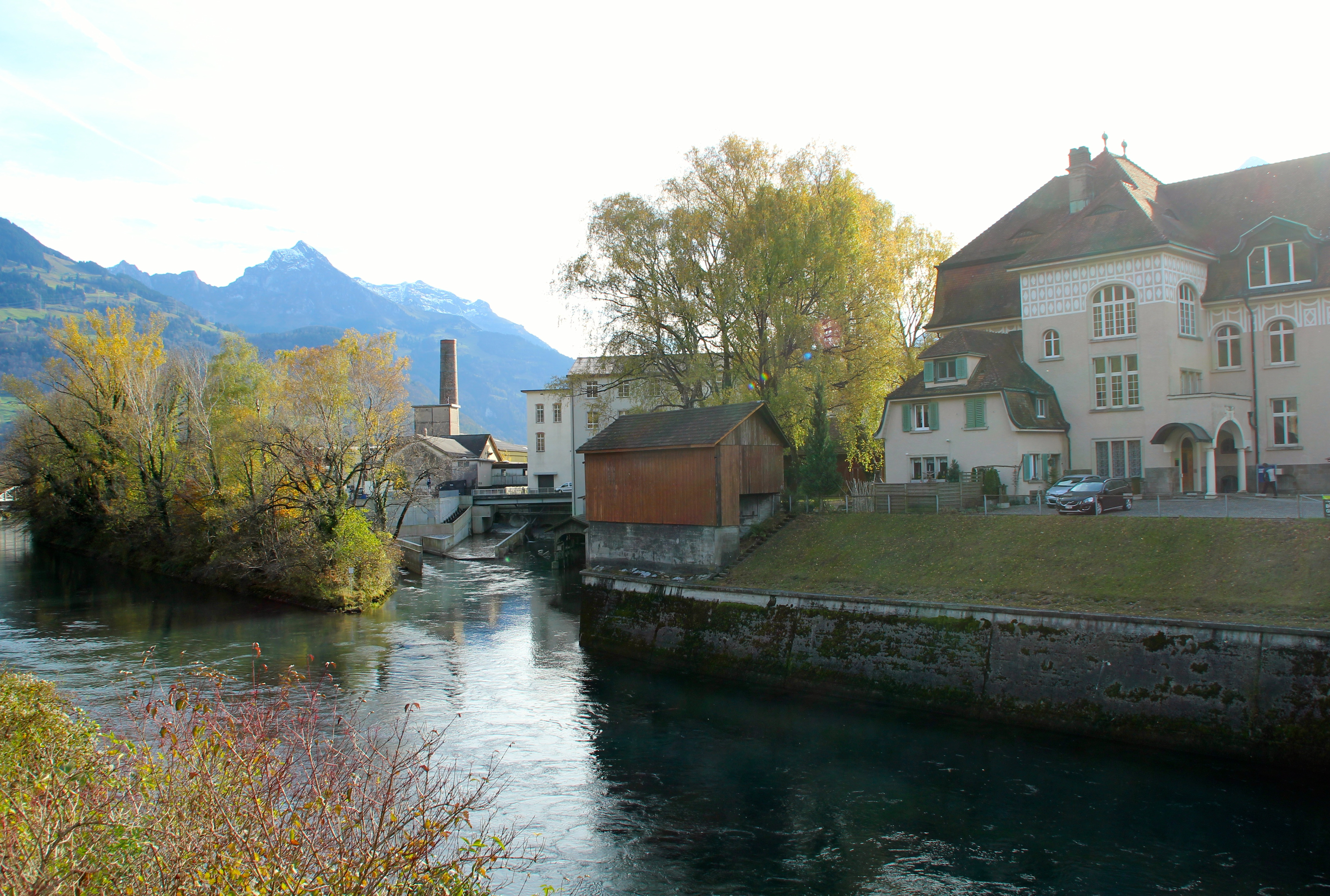
Buildings on the southern side (canton of Glarus) of the Linth Channel

Ziegelbrücke is a village situated on both sides of the Linth Channel in Switzerland. Ziegelbrücke is shared by the municipalities of Niederurnen in the canton of Glarus and Schänis in the canton of St. Gallen, with the Linth forming the boundary between these municipalities.

== Name ==
The name refers to a bridge (German: Brücke) covered by a roof with tiles (German: Ziegel). The presence of such a bridge was first documented in 1532.

This bridge was located approximately where the current bridge over the Linth Channel is nowadays. However, prior to the taming of the Linth (1807–1823), the River Linth ran west of Lake Walen (Walensee), and where the Linth Channel is today, there used to be a small river, the Maag, flowing out of Lake Walen and into the former River Linth. The old bridge was over the Maag.

== Geography and political situation ==
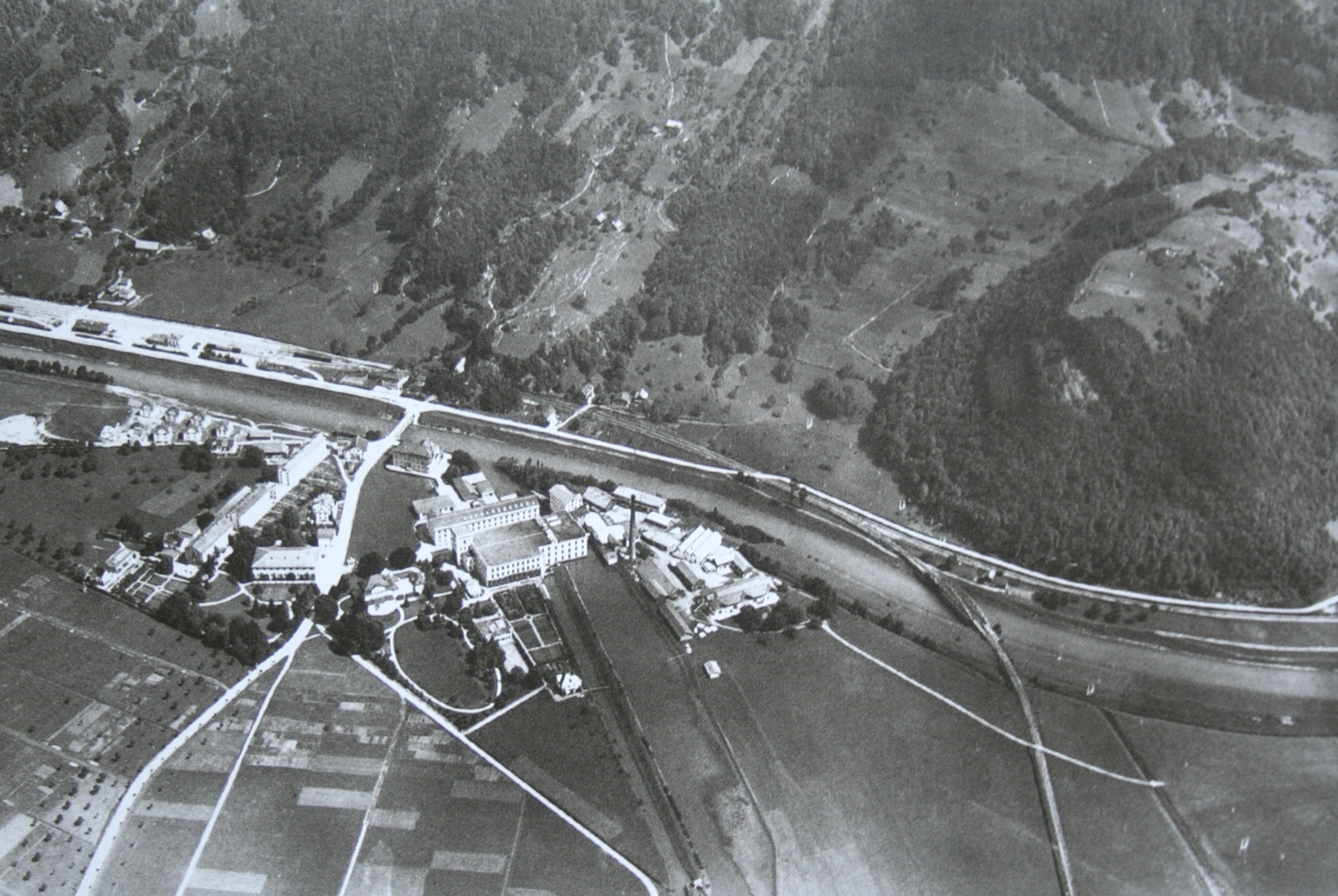
Ziegelbrücke on an aerial photography by Walter Mittelholzer (~ 1920)

The village of Ziegelbrücke is divided by the Linth Channel into two parts: The northern part, including Ziegelbrücke railway station, is located in the municipality of Schänis in the canton of St. Gallen. The southern part, on the other side of the Linth, is located in the canton of Glarus in the municipality of Glarus Nord.

== History and Economics ==
At the former Roman tariff station, near the Maag and Linth rivers between Lake Walen (Walensee) and Lake Zürich (Zürichsee), a Mercury statue was found. The center of the village is situated on the territory of the canton of Glarus around Fritz & Caspar Jenny AG, a spinning and weaving factoring established in 1833, and which is part of the Inventory of Swiss Heritage Sites. The vocational school of Glarus is also situated in the Glarus part of Ziegelbrücke. On the side of the canton of St. Gallen, Ziegelbrücke railway station is located; around 70 people are living and working there.

== Transportation ==
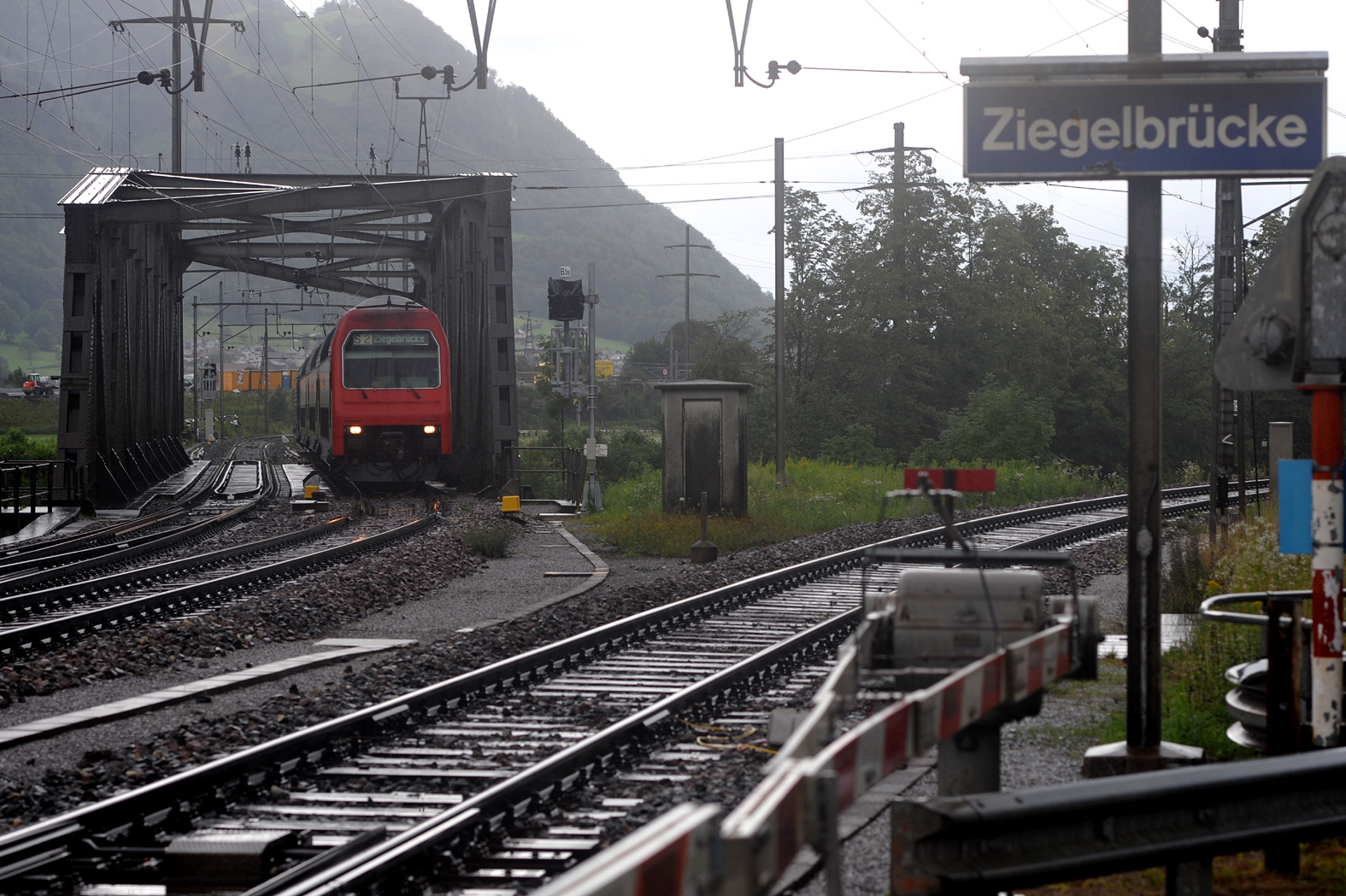
S-Bahn Zürich S2 line crossing the Linth channel in Ziegelbrücke

Ziegelbrücke railway station, located north of the Linth Channel in the canton of St. Gallen, is a nodal point on the Lake Zürich left bank line, the Ziegelbrücke–Sargans line and the Rapperswil–Ziegelbrücke line. The station is served by the InterRegio (IR35) line between Zürich HB/Bern and Chur, named train Aare Linth operated by Swiss Federal Railways (SBB CFF FFS) and Südostbahn (SOB), and S-Bahn lines to Zürich, Sargans, Rapperswil/Toggenburg and the Linth Valley in the canton of Glarus.

The station is the terminus of the Zürich S-Bahn line S2 to Zürich Flughafen, and an intermediate stop of the S25 service to Linthal (via Glarus) and Zürich HB. Ziegelbrücke is also an intermediate station of the S4 of St. Gallen S-Bahn (operated by SOB), a circle route around the Alpstein that runs between St. Gallen, Sargans and Uznach in both clockwise and counter-clockwise directions. Another regional train, the S6 of St. Gallen S-Bahn (operated by SOB) connects Ziegelbrücke with Schwanden/Linthal (via Glarus) and Rapperswil (via Uznach). The peak hour service S27, which does not belong to any S-Bahn network, operates between Ziegelbrücke and Siebnen-Wangen.

In addition, the Postauto and local Autobetrieb Weesen-Amden bus lines connect the communities in the See-Gaster Wahlkreis and the municipalities of Bilten and Niederurnen.
