= S27 (Südostbahn) =

Railway service in Switzerland

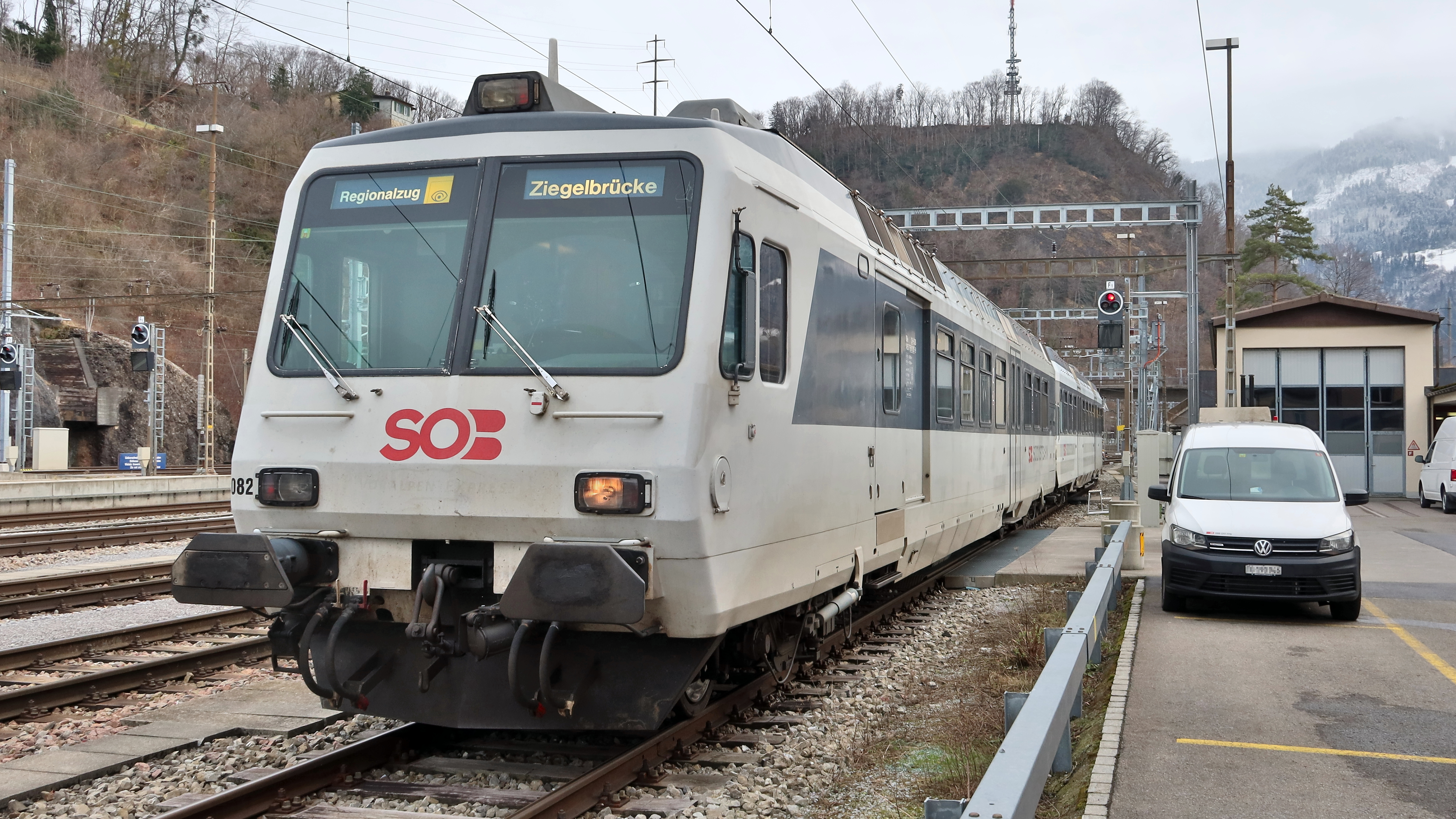
- An S27 at Ziegelbrücke in January 2022

Overview
- First service: 15 June 2014
- Current operator(s): Südostbahn

Route
- Termini: Ziegelbrücke; Siebnen-Wangen
- Stops: 5
- Distance travelled: 13.7 kilometres (8.5 mi)
- Average journey time: 12 minutes
- Service frequency: 10 round-trips on weekdays
- Line(s) used: Lake Zürich left-bank

The S27 is a rush-hour railway service that connects the Swiss municipalities of Wangen and Ziegelbrücke. Despite its name, it is not formally part of the St. Gallen S-Bahn or Zürich S-Bahn networks. Südostbahn, a private company primarily owned by the federal government and several cantons, operates the service.

== Operations ==
The S27 is a weekday-only rush-hour service. Five trains operate in each direction between Ziegelbrücke and Siebnen-Wangen in the morning and again in the evening. The S27 is the only regular service for the three intermediate stops, save a few late-night and early-morning stops by the S2 and S8 of the Zürich S-Bahn.

== History ==
The S27 was introduced with the 15 June 2014 timetable change, replacing the S2 between Ziegelbrücke and Siebnen-Wangen. The S2 now ran express between those stops. With the December 2017 timetable change, the service level was significantly reduced: weekend trains were eliminated, and weekday service was reduced from half-hourly to rush-hour only.
