= S2 (ZVV) =

Railway service in Switzerland

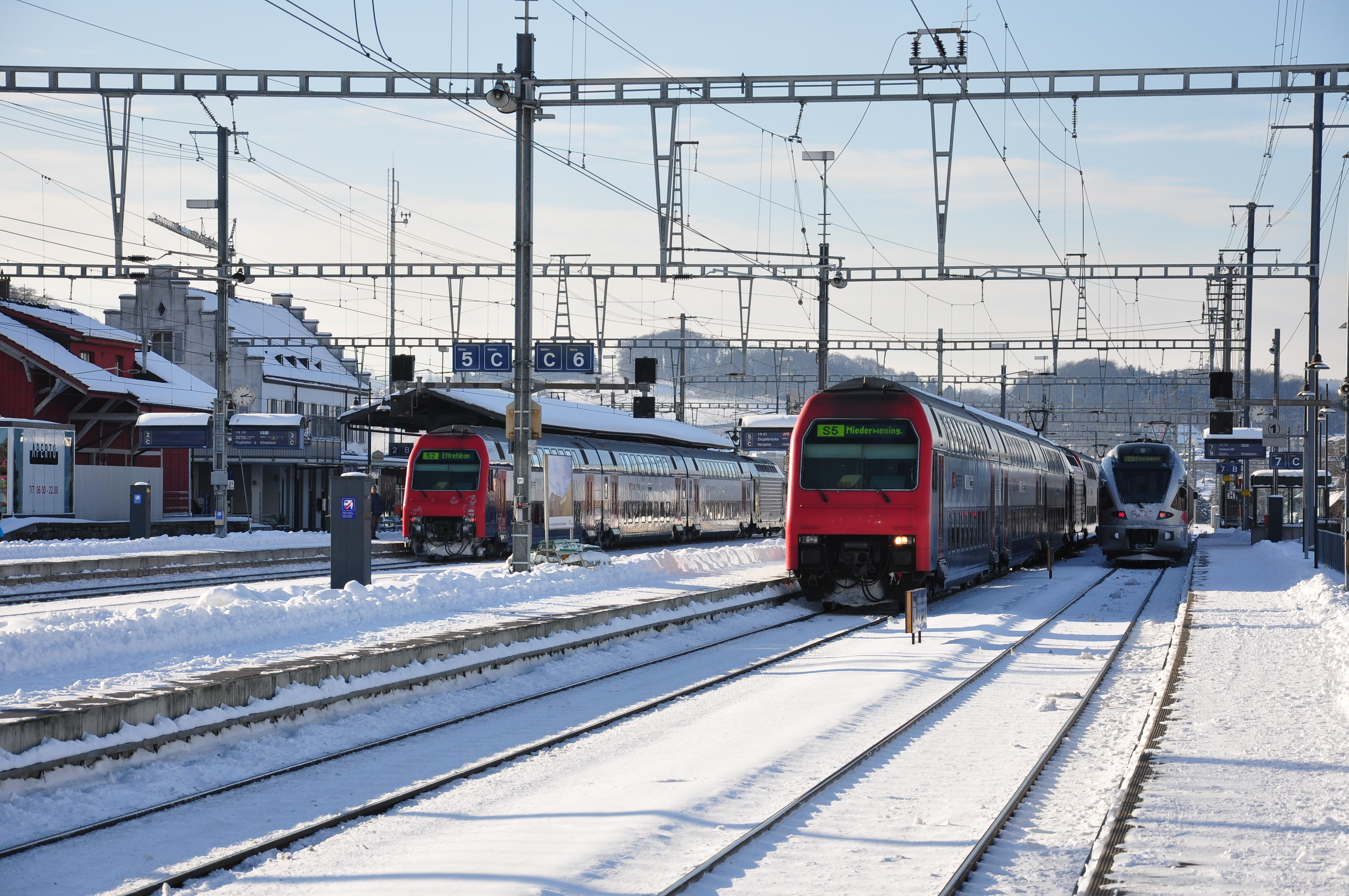
- An S2 train (left) with an S5 train (middle) at Pfäffikon SZ in 2010

Overview
- Service type: S-Bahn service
- Locale: Zurich S-Bahn
- Current operator(s): Swiss Federal Railways

Route
- Termini: Zurich Airport; Ziegelbrücke
- Stops: 15
- Average journey time: 1 hour 5 minutes
- Service frequency: Every 30 minutes
- Line(s) used: Zurich–Winterthur line; Lake Zurich left-bank line

Technical
- Rolling stock: RABe 514 class

Zurich S-Bahn network as of December 2018

The S2 is a railway service of the Zurich S-Bahn on the Zürcher Verkehrsverbund (ZVV) transportation network, and is one of the network's services connecting the canton of Zurich with the cantons of Schwyz and St. Gallen.

At Zürich HB, trains of the S2 service usually depart from underground platforms (Gleise) 31–34 (Löwenstrasse station).

== Route ==
- S2 Zürich Flughafen –Oerlikon–Zürich HB–Thalwil–Pfäffikon SZ–Ziegelbrücke
  Stops between Zürich Enge and Ziegelbrücke only in Thalwil, Horgen, Wädenswil, Richterswil, Pfäffikon SZ, Altendorf, Lachen and Siebnen-Wangen.

The service links Zurich Airport with Ziegelbrücke, a village and railway junction on the border between the cantons of St. Gallen and Glarus. From the airport, the service runs via Oerlikon and the Weinberg Tunnel to Zürich Hauptbahnhof. From Zürich Hauptbahnhof, the service uses the Lake Zurich left-bank railway line to Ziegelbrücke, stopping only at selected stations.

- Zürich Flughafen (indicated as Zürich on destination sign)
- Zürich Oerlikon
- Zürich Hauptbahnhof
- Zürich Wiedikon
- Zürich Enge
- Thalwil
- Horgen
- Wädenswil
- Richterswil
- Pfäffikon SZ
- Altendorf
- Lachen
- Siebnen-Wangen
- Ziegelbrücke

== Rolling stock ==
As of the December 2022 timetable change, all services are operated with RABe 514 class trains.

== Scheduling ==
The train frequency is usually 30 minutes and the trip takes 65 minutes between Zurich Airport and Ziegelbrücke.

== History ==
Originally, the S2 operated between Zurich Airport and Ziegelbrücke. With the 15 June 2014 timetable change (opening of the Weinberg Tunnel), the route was lengthened to Unterterzen (without intermediate stops) and services to stations between Siebnen-Wangen and Ziegelbrücke were suspended. The S27 (March shuttle), which is not part of the Zurich S-Bahn network (or the St. Gallen S-Bahn network), was introduced, replacing the S2 between Ziegelbrücke and Siebnen-Wangen (operates only during peak-hour).

With the 15 December 2024 timetable change, the S2's southern terminus became again Ziegelbrücke, and instead IR35 (Aare–Linth) now additionally calls at Unterterzen.

== See also ==
- Rail transport in Switzerland
- List of railway stations in Zurich
- Public transport in Zurich
- ZVV fare zones
