= Lake Zurich left-bank railway line =

Railway line in Switzerland

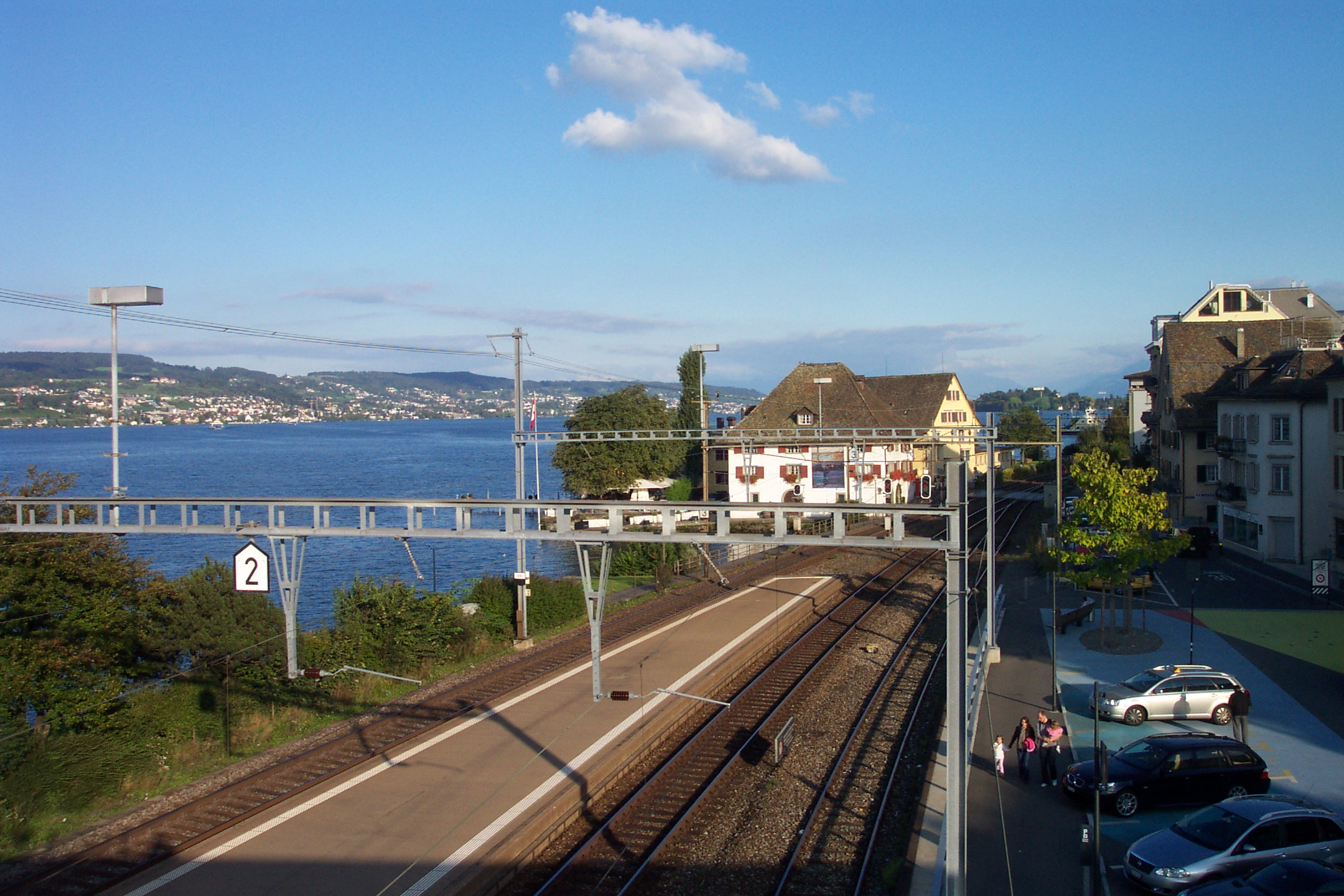
- The line at Horgen, showing the proximity of Lake Zurich

Service
- Route number: 720 (Zurich–Ziegelbrücke); 736 (Ziegelbrücke–Näfels)

Technical
- Line length: 61.31 kilometres (38.10 mi)
- Track gauge: 1,435 mm (4 ft 8 1/2 in) standard gauge
- Electrification: 15 kV/16.7 Hz AC Overhead line
- Maximum incline: 1.7 %

The Lake Zurich left bank railway line (German: Linksufrige Zürichseebahn), is a railway line in Switzerland. It serves the left (or west) bank of Lake Zurich, connecting Zurich to Ziegelbrücke and Näfels.

The left-bank railway opened in 1875 and forms part of the Zurich–Chur main line. It is 61.31 kilometres (38.10 mi) long, standard gauge, double track and electrified at 15 kV 16.7 Hz AC supplied by overhead line. Between Zurich and Thalwil, the line originally shared its tracks with the Zurich–Lucerne main line, although many through trains on this stretch now use the Zimmerberg Base Tunnel rather than the lakeside line.

== Geography ==
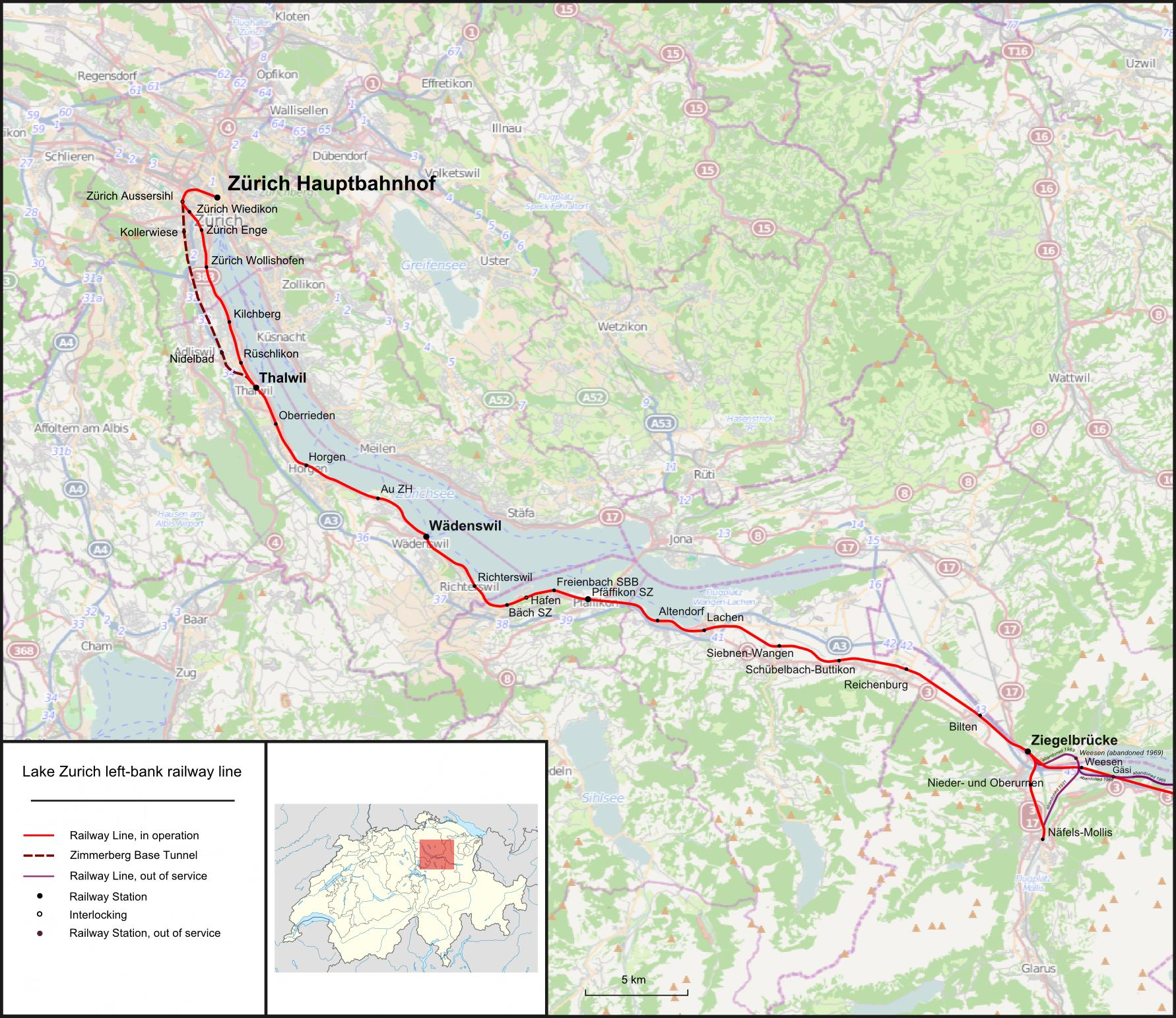

== History ==
The line was opened by the Swiss Northeastern Railway in 1875. Prior to this, trains between Zurich and Chur travelled on the Wallisellen to Rapperswil via Uster line. The parallel line on the opposite bank of Lake Zürich did not open until 1894.

Between 1875 and 1925, the line followed a routing through Zurich north of Wollishofen that differed from the current alignment and was largely at street level, with many level crossings. The line passed through a single tunnel, the original Ulmberg rail tunnel, and crossed the Sihl river on a bridge. Between 1925 and 1927, this stretch of line was relocated westwards and to a lower level, largely in the new Ulmberg and Enge tunnels, and the current Wiedikon and Enge stations date from this period. The original Ulmberg rail tunnel is still in use for road traffic, forming the western bore of the Ulmberg road tunnel, but most of the rest of the former route has been obscured by subsequent building.
