= Kaltbrunn =

- Municipality
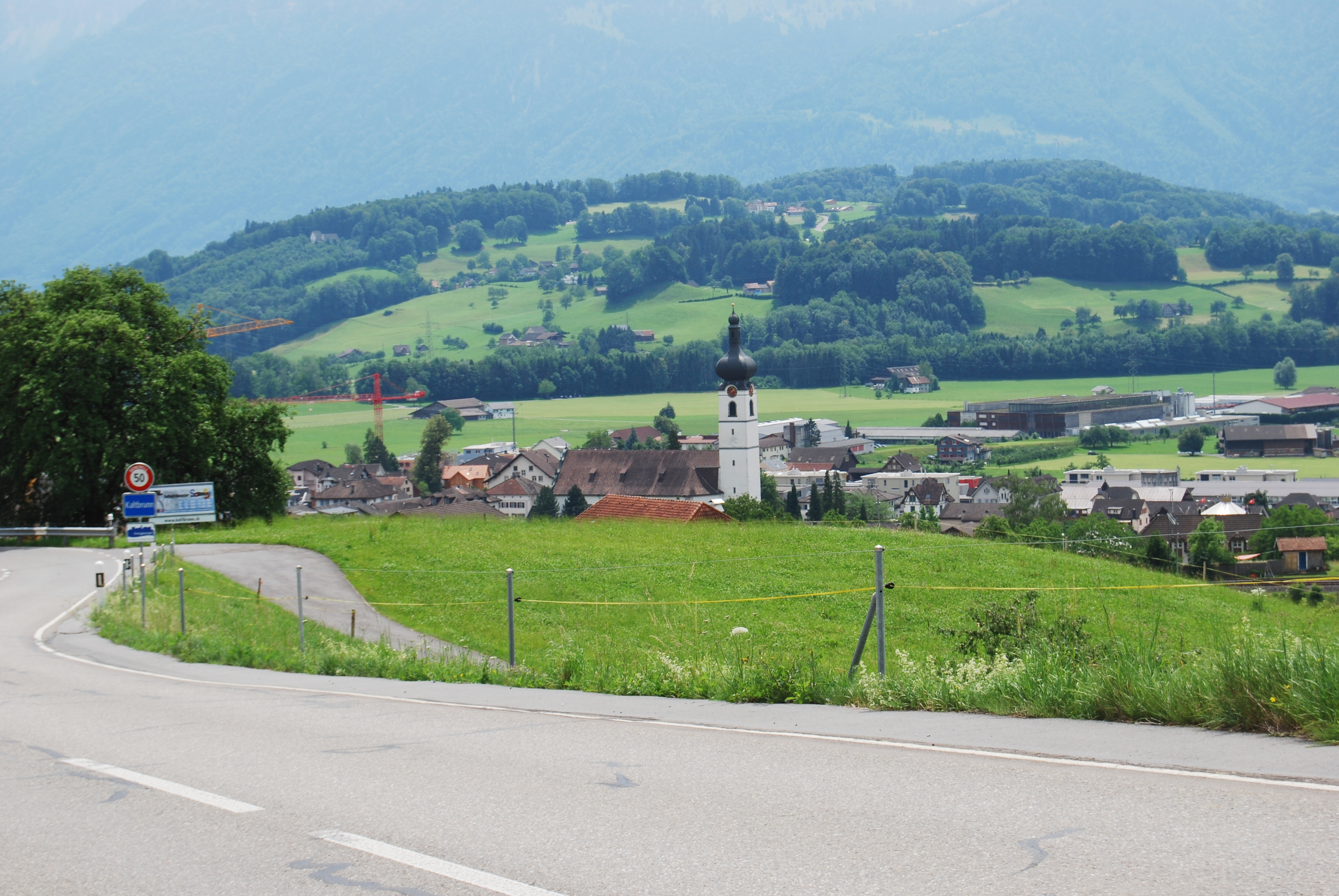

- Coat of arms
- Location of Kaltbrunn
- Location within Switzerland Location within Canton of St. Gallen
- Coordinates: 47°13′N 9°2′E
- Country: Switzerland
- Canton: St. Gallen
- District: See-Gaster

Government
  - Mayor: Markus Schwizer

Area
  - Total: 18.68 km^{2} (7.21 sq mi)
- Elevation: 440 m (1,440 ft)

Population (December 2020)
  - Total: 4,976
  - Density: 266.4/km^{2} (689.9/sq mi)
- Time zone: UTC+01:00 (CET)
  - Summer (DST): UTC+02:00 (CEST)
- Postal code: 8722
- SFOS number: 3313
- ISO 3166 code: CH-SG
- Surrounded by: Benken, Ebnat-Kappel, Ernetschwil, Gommiswald, Rieden, Schänis, Uznach
- Website: kaltbrunn.ch

Kaltbrunn is a municipality in the Wahlkreis (constituency) of See-Gaster in the canton of St. Gallen in Switzerland.

== History ==
Kaltbrunn was first mentioned in 940 as Chaldebrunna.

== Geography ==
Aerial view (1953)

Kaltbrunn has an area, as of 2006, of 18.6 km^{2} (7.2 sq mi). Of this area, 55.6% is used for agricultural purposes, while 33.5% is forested. Of the rest of the land, 7.8% is settled (buildings or roads) and the remainder (3.1%) is non-productive (rivers or lakes).

The municipality is located in the See-Gaster Wahlkreis in the Linth valley. It consists of the village of Kaltbrunn and the hamlets of Fischhausen, Wilen and Steinenbrücke in the valley, while on the sparsely inhabited hills are the hamlets of Gublen, Chirnen and Altwies.

== Coat of arms ==
The blazon of the municipal coat of arms is Gules, St. George armoured, cloaked and helmeted Azure with a shield Argent a cross Gules and with lance Sable riding a Horse Argent killing the Dragon Sable

== Demographics ==
Kaltbrunn has a population (as of 31 December 2020) of 4,976. As of 2007, about 18.8% of the population was made up of foreign nationals. Of the foreign population, (as of 2000), 44 are from Germany, 140 are from Italy, 418 are from ex-Yugoslavia, 18 are from Austria, 37 are from Turkey, and 107 are from other countries. Over the last 10 years the population has grown at a rate of 6.3%. Most of the population (as of 2000) speaks German (86.8%), with Serbo-Croatian being second most common ( 4.0%) and Albanian being third ( 3.0%). Of the Swiss national languages (as of 2000), 3,206 speak German, 11 people speak French, 98 people speak Italian, and 8 people speak Romansh.

The age distribution, as of 2000, in Kaltbrunn is; 542 children or 14.7% of the population are between 0 and 9 years old and 620 teenagers or 16.8% are between 10 and 19. Of the adult population, 442 people or 12.0% of the population are between 20 and 29 years old. 622 people or 16.8% are between 30 and 39, 530 people or 14.3% are between 40 and 49, and 393 people or 10.6% are between 50 and 59. The senior population distribution is 244 people or 6.6% of the population are between 60 and 69 years old, 164 people or 4.4% are between 70 and 79, there are 122 people or 3.3% who are between 80 and 89, and there are 15 people or 0.4% who are between 90 and 99.

In 2000 there were 386 persons (or 10.4% of the population) who were living alone in a private dwelling. There were 612 (or 16.6%) persons who were part of a couple (married or otherwise committed) without children, and 2,373 (or 64.2%) who were part of a couple with children. There were 170 (or 4.6%) people who lived in single parent home, while there are 26 persons who were adult children living with one or both parents, 5 persons who lived in a household made up of relatives, 29 who lived household made up of unrelated persons, and 93 who are either institutionalized or live in another type of collective housing.

year	population
1838	1,572
1900	1,700
1920	2,279
1950	2,451
2000	3,694

In the 2007 federal election the most popular party was the SVP which received 41.4% of the vote. The next three most popular parties were the CVP (26.7%), the SP (9.1%) and the Green Party (7.8%).

The entire Swiss population is generally well educated. In Kaltbrunn about 61.7% of the population (between age 25–64) have completed either non-mandatory upper secondary education or additional higher education (either university or a Fachhochschule). Out of the total population in Kaltbrunn, as of 2000, the highest education level completed by 907 people (24.6% of the population) was Primary, while 1,174 (31.8%) have completed Secondary, 266 (7.2%) have attended a Tertiary school, and 176 (4.8%) are not in school. The remainder did not answer this question.

== Economy ==
As of 2007, Kaltbrunn had an unemployment rate of 1.48%. As of 2005, there were 185 people employed in the primary economic sector and about 77 businesses involved in this sector. 496 people are employed in the secondary sector and there are 55 businesses in this sector. 564 people are employed in the tertiary sector, with 112 businesses in this sector.

As of October 2009 the average unemployment rate was 3.6%. There were 236 businesses in the municipality of which 50 were involved in the secondary sector of the economy while 115 were involved in the third.

As of 2000 there were 763 residents who worked in the municipality, while 1,134 residents worked outside Kaltbrunn and 562 people commuted into the municipality for work.

== Religion ==
From the 2000 census, 2,499 or 67.7% are Roman Catholic, while 377 or 10.2% belonged to the Swiss Reformed Church. Of the rest of the population, there are 2 individuals (or about 0.05% of the population) who belong to the Christian Catholic faith, there are 156 individuals (or about 4.22% of the population) who belong to the Orthodox Church, and there are 74 individuals (or about 2.00% of the population) who belong to another Christian church. There is 1 individual who is Jewish, and 211 (or about 5.71% of the population) who are Islamic. There are 13 individuals (or about 0.35% of the population) who belong to another church (not listed on the census), 187 (or about 5.06% of the population) belong to no church, are agnostic or atheist, and 174 individuals (or about 4.71% of the population) did not answer the question.

== People ==
=== Born in Kaltbrunn ===
People born or raised in Kaltbrunn include:

- Maria Josefa Karolina Brader (1860–1943), a Roman Catholic professed religious who founded the Franciscan Sisters of Mary Immaculate, beatified by Pope John Paul II on 23 March 2003
