= Alfredo Battistini =

Swiss sculptor, illustrator, athlete

Alfredo Battistini (8 August 1953, in Uznach, Switzerland – 17 May 2008, in St. Gallenkappel, Switzerland) was an Italian-Swiss sculptor, illustrator, and athlete.

== Life ==
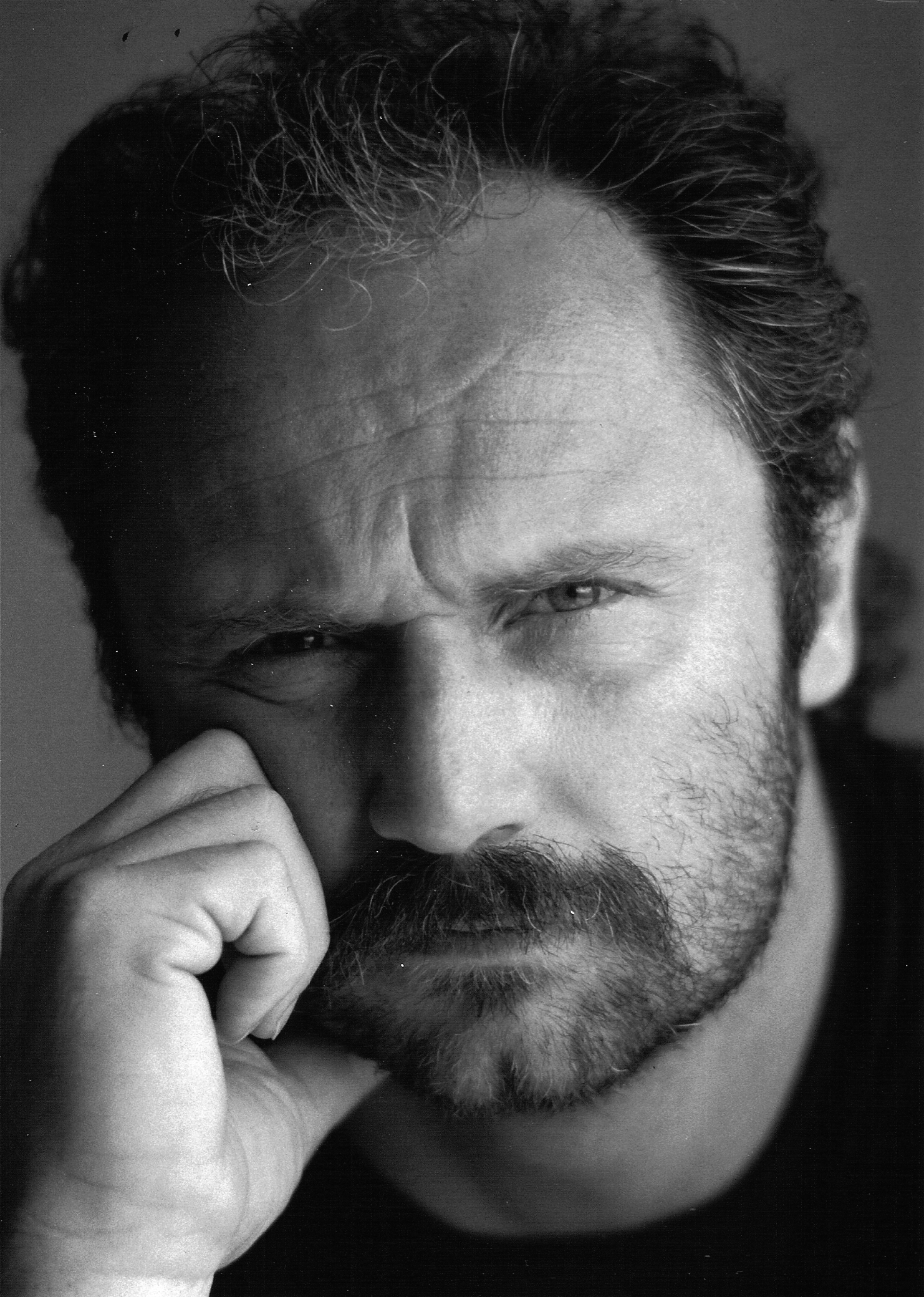
Alfredo Battistini

Alfredo Battistini was born in Uznach, Switzerland on 8 August 1953. His parents Alearda di Traglia and Alfredo Battistini originated from San Piero in Bagno and Sarsina in the Romagna, Italy.

On 26 December 1971 he boxed in the support fight to Muhammad Ali’s match with Juergen Blin at the Hallenstadion in Zurich. He became Swiss Light Heavyweight Boxing Champion in 1976. As a disabled athlete he later won five World Championships, two European Championships and twenty five Swiss weightlifting titles. He won three bronze medals at 1988 Summer Paralympics in Seoul and 1992 Summer Paralympics in Barcelona. He won gold and silver medals at the World Championships in Stoke Mandeville, England and Sydney, Australia. His record performance was a lift of two hundred and twenty kilos.

His first apprenticeship was as a bricklayer. In 1976 he moved to Paris to work as an assistant to the fashion photographer Lothar Schmid. He also completed a qualification as a stonemason in Rapperswil, his Swiss hometown. He also took an apprenticeship as a sports masseur to study human anatomy. He went on to work for Hans Joerg Limbach, studying as the distinguished sculptor's sole student.

In 1979, he won a place at the Art Academy in Paris. On 27 May of that year, he was paralyzed in a car accident and was restricted to a wheel chair thereafter. He overcame this setback to devote himself to his art and sport, the later an important part of his rehabilitation. A philanthropist with a strong sense of justice for the weak and disadvantaged, in 2004 he received an award for his achievements at The Paraplegic Centre in Switzerland as Paraplegic of the Year.

His love and passion was art and sculpting. He began his early works after a year long study trip through Chile including visits to the Art College in Santiago. In 1983, with the support of Guido A. Zaech, he presented his first exhibition in Bottmingen near Basle. Those works show the inspiration he derived from both Hans Joerg Limbach and Auguste Rodin, and above all the master, Michelangelo himself. His sculptures and choice of material, bronze and marble, reveal his iron will coupled with both sensitivity and vulnerability. His achievement is recognised by many public and sporting works including a piece in honour of the Circus Knie at the entrance to Rapperswil or the trophy for the Stuttgart Open Tennis Championship which was received by Boris Becker, Stefan Edberg, Thomas Muster and Petr Korda. Alfredo Battistini died unexpectedly on 17 March 2008 due to heart failure in his home town St. Gallenkappel at the peak of his career. He was only 54 years old.

== Museum ==
In 2009 Alfredo Battistini's sculpture "La Creazione", an homage to Michelangelo's creation of Adam in the Sistine Chapel in Rome, was installed in the "Museo Michelangiolesco". This museum is located next to the master's birthplace in the town of Caprese Michelangelo, Tuscany. Michelangelo Buonarroti was born there on 6 March 1475.

== Athletic achievements ==
=== Boxing ===
- 1971
  - Support fight „Muhammed Ali versus Jürgen Blin“
- 1975
  - Swiss Champion in light heavyweight
- 1976
  - Swiss Champion in light heavyweight

=== Pentathlon ===
- 1981
  - Swiss Champion

=== Weight lifting, wheel chair athletics ===
- 1982
  - World Light Heavyweight Champion and Swiss Champion
  - 9th Swiss Wheelchair Championship in Biel
- 1983
  - Vice Light Heavyweight Champion and Swiss champion
  - 10th Swiss Wheelchair Championship in Thun
- 1984
  - Swiss Light Heavyweight Champion
  - 11th Swiss Wheelchair Championship in Zurich
  - 7th World Wheelchair Games, Paralympics Stoke Mandeville UK, bronze medal (category +95 kg, 195 kg)
  - 1st National Wheelchair Sport Meeting in Grosshoechstetten. Gold Medalist
- 1985
  - World Light Heavyweight Champion (first lift in wheelchair exceeding 200 kg)
  - 8th World Wheelchair Games, Paralympics Stoke Mandeville UK. Gold Medalist
  - Swiss Champion at bench press (included able bodied athletes)
- 1986
  - World, European and Swiss Light Heavyweight Champion in Kriens & Thun
  - Swiss Champion at bench press (included able bodied athletes)
- 1987
  - World and Swiss Light Heavyweight Champion
  - Swiss champion at bench press (included able bodied athletes)
  - International Stoke Mandeville Games. Gold Medalist
  - 14th Swiss Wheelchair Championship in Freiburg
  - 2nd Champion at Swiss Dev. Gouche Seniors
- 1988
  - World Light Heavyweight Champion
  - Seoul Paralympics power lifting, (category +95 kg, 187.5 kg) Bronze Medalist
- 1992
  - Swiss Champion. Bench Press 200, 220 kg
  - 19th Swiss Wheelchair Championship in Zug
  - Barcelona Paralympics power lifting (category +100 kg, 190 kg) Bronze Medalist
  - World Champion and World Record at the 17th National Wheelchair Games in Adelaide, Australia lifting 220 kg
- 1993
  - Gold medal at the world wheel power games Stoke Mandeville, weight lifting, power lifting and combination
  - Swiss Champion in bench press 220 kg
  - ISMWSF Games Gold
- 1994
  - Swiss Champion and Swiss record (12 times improved) at bench press
- 1995
  - 2nd Swiss Arm Wrestling Cup in St. Gallen. Record holder for bench press
- 1996
  - Swiss Champion class and overall for bench press in Bremgarten (Swiss record of 220 kg)
- 1998
  - Vice Swiss Champion at bench press in Bremgarten (210 kg)
  - Swiss Championship in wheelchair sports, Rapperswil
- 2000
  - Swiss Champion at bench press in Bremgarten (category +100 kg, 210 kg)

== Key sculptures ==
- 1982
  - Laura
  - Inspiration
- 1985
  - Ueberdosis Menschheit
- 1992
  - C’est la vie
  - Male torso
- 1993
  - Memorial to Circus Knie in Rapperswil – White Clown
  - Trophy for Eurocard Open in Stuttgart
- 1994
  - Spirale zum Erfolg
  - Tomb Daniela Jutzeler
  - Tomb for unnamed
- 1995
  - La Creazione (the creation)
- 1997
  - La Luce (small)
  - Waerme des Lebens
  - Sempre Donne
  - Mondo Elefanti – memorial for Rolf Knie
  - Champion – Trophy for Andy Hug
- 2002
  - La Luce (large)
  - Gil, dedication to Gil Rossellini
- 2003
  - Engel der Liebe
- 2006
  - Faust /Kraft
  - Politiker sind Moerder
- 2007
  - Il Tempo, marble
  - Glut, marble carrara
- undated
  - Geborgenheit
  - Insieme
  - Per sempre (bronze and marble)
  - Sempre Donne (bronze and marble)

== Movies ==
- 2006
  - Kill Gil Volume 2-story of Gil Rossellini starring Gil Rossellini
