= Ernetschwil =

- Former municipality
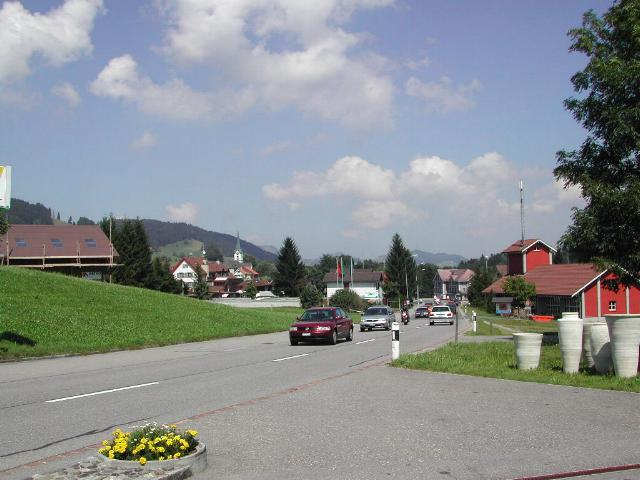

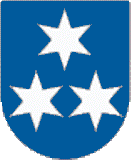
- Coat of arms
- Location of Ernetschwil
- Location within Switzerland Location within Canton of St. Gallen
- Coordinates: 47°14′N 9°0′E
- Country: Switzerland
- Canton: St. Gallen
- District: See-Gaster

Government
  - Mayor: Hugo Kessler

Area
  - Total: 10.26 km^{2} (3.96 sq mi)
- Elevation: 575 m (1,886 ft)

Population (Dec 2011)
  - Total: 1,434
  - Density: 139.8/km^{2} (362.0/sq mi)
- Time zone: UTC+01:00 (CET)
  - Summer (DST): UTC+02:00 (CEST)
- Postal code: 8725
- SFOS number: 3331
- ISO 3166 code: CH-SG
- Surrounded by: Gommiswald, Kaltbrunn, Sankt Gallenkappel, Uznach, Wattwil
- Website: www.ernetschwil.ch

Ernetschwil is a former municipality in the Wahlkreis (constituency) of See-Gaster in the canton of St. Gallen in Switzerland. On 1 January 2013 the former municipalities of Rieden and Ernetschwil merged into the municipality of Gommiswald.

== History ==
Ernetschwil is first mentioned in 885 as Eidwarteswilare.

== Geography ==
Ernetschwil had an area, as of 2006, of 10.3 km^{2} (4.0 sq mi). Of this area, 67.3% is used for agricultural purposes, while 20.2% is forested. Of the rest of the land, 7.7% is settled (buildings or roads) and the remainder (4.8%) is non-productive (rivers or lakes).

The former municipality is located in the See-Gaster Wahlkreis in the mid-foothills on the southern slope of the Ricken Pass. Throughout the Middle Ages the area consisted of scattered settlements without a central village. It consists of the hamlets of Ernetschwil, Freudwil, Häblingen, Gebertingen, Hof (until the 16th century known as Lügenschwil), Ricken, Schümberg and Schwarzholz.

== Coat of arms ==
The blazon of the municipal coat of arms is Azure three Mullets Argent one and two.

== Demographics ==
Ernetschwil had a population (as of 2011) of 1,434. As of 2007, about 6.2% of the population was made up of foreign nationals. Of the foreign population, (as of 2000), 23 are from Germany, 7 are from Italy, 7 are from ex-Yugoslavia, 5 are from Austria, and 14 are from another country. Over the last 10 years the population has grown at a rate of 17.8%. Most of the population (as of 2000) speaks German (97.8%), with Italian being second most common ( 0.4%) and French being third ( 0.3%). Of the Swiss national languages (as of 2000), 1,261 speak German, 4 people speak French, 5 people speak Italian, and 1 person speaks Romansh.

The age distribution, as of 2000, in Ernetschwil is; 222 children or 17.2% of the population are between 0 and 9 years old and 183 teenagers or 14.2% are between 10 and 19. Of the adult population, 142 people or 11.0% of the population are between 20 and 29 years old. 246 people or 19.1% are between 30 and 39, 175 people or 13.6% are between 40 and 49, and 138 people or 10.7% are between 50 and 59. The senior population distribution is 102 people or 7.9% of the population are between 60 and 69 years old, 64 people or 5.0% are between 70 and 79, there are 14 people or 1.1% who are between 80 and 89, and there are 3 people or 0.2% who are between 90 and 99.

In 2000 there were 116 persons (or 9.0% of the population) who were living alone in a private dwelling. There were 253 (or 19.6%) persons who were part of a couple (married or otherwise committed) without children, and 831 (or 64.5%) who were part of a couple with children. There were 53 (or 4.1%) people who lived in single parent home, while there are 6 persons who were adult children living with one or both parents, 5 persons who lived in a household made up of relatives, 12 who lived household made up of unrelated persons, and 13 who are either institutionalized or live in another type of collective housing.

In the 2007 federal election the most popular party was the SVP which received 46.3% of the vote. The next three most popular parties were the CVP (24.4%), the FDP (8.8%) and the Green Party (8.1%).

The entire Swiss population is generally well educated. In Ernetschwil about 70.8% of the population (between age 25 and 64) have completed either non-mandatory upper secondary education or additional higher education (either university or a Fachhochschule). Out of the total population in Ernetschwil, as of 2000, the highest education level completed by 286 people (22.2% of the population) was Primary, while 453 (35.1%) have completed Secondary, 124 (9.6%) have attended a Tertiary school, and 45 (3.5%) are not in school. The remainder did not answer this question.

The historical population is given in the following table:

year	population
1831	770
1850	713
1900	692
1950	707
2000	1,289

== Economy ==
As of 2007, Ernetschwil had an unemployment rate of 1.24%. As of 2005, there were 137 people employed in the primary economic sector and about 50 businesses involved in this sector. 62 people are employed in the secondary sector and there are 14 businesses in this sector. 132 people are employed in the tertiary sector, with 37 businesses in this sector.

As of October 2009 the average unemployment rate was 2.2%. There were 106 businesses in the municipality of which 21 were involved in the secondary sector of the economy while 40 were involved in the third.

As of 2000 there were 184 residents who worked in the municipality, while 489 residents worked outside Ernetschwil and 81 people commuted into the municipality for work.

== Religion ==
From the 2000 census, 952 or 73.9% are Roman Catholic, while 194 or 15.1% belonged to the Swiss Reformed Church. Of the rest of the population, there are 5 individuals (or about 0.39% of the population) who belong to the Orthodox Church, and there are 13 individuals (or about 1.01% of the population) who belong to another Christian church. There is 1 individual who is Jewish, and 3 (or about 0.23% of the population) who are Islamic. There are 6 individuals (or about 0.47% of the population) who belong to another church (not listed on the census), 87 (or about 6.75% of the population) belong to no church, are agnostic or atheist, and 28 individuals (or about 2.17% of the population) did not answer the question.
