= Ebnat-Kappel =

- Municipality
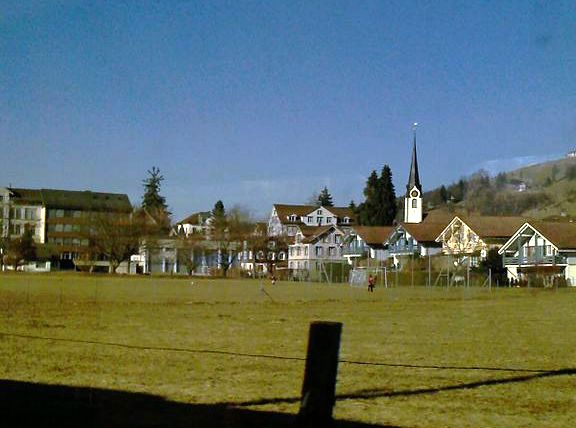
- Ebnat-Kappel Village Church

- Coat of arms
- Location of Ebnat-Kappel
- Location within Switzerland Location within Canton of St. Gallen
- Coordinates: 47°16′N 9°7′E
- Country: Switzerland
- Canton: St. Gallen
- District: Toggenburg

Government
  - Mayor: Jon Fadri Huder

Area
  - Total: 43.57 km^{2} (16.82 sq mi)
- Elevation: 630 m (2,070 ft)

Population (December 2020)
  - Total: 5,007
  - Density: 114.9/km^{2} (297.6/sq mi)
- Time zone: UTC+01:00 (CET)
  - Summer (DST): UTC+02:00 (CEST)
- Postal code: 9642
- SFOS number: 3352
- ISO 3166 code: CH-SG
- Surrounded by: Amden, Gommiswald, Hemberg, Kaltbrunn, Nesslau-Krummenau, Rieden, Schänis, Wattwil
- Website: ebnat-kappel.ch

Ebnat-Kappel is a municipality in the Wahlkreis (constituency) of Toggenburg in the canton of St. Gallen in Switzerland.

== History ==
Kappel is first mentioned in 1218 as Capelle. Until 1762 Ebnat was known as Ober-Wattwil.

== Geography ==
Aerial view from 100 m by Walter Mittelholzer (1919)

Ebnat-Kappel has an area, as of 2006, of 43.6 km^{2} (16.8 sq mi). Of this area, 49% is used for agricultural purposes, while 42.9% is forested. Of the rest of the land, 5.2% is settled (buildings or roads) and the remainder (2.9%) is non-productive (rivers or lakes).

The municipality is located in the Toggenburg Wahlkreis in the Thur river valley. It was formed in 1965 through the merger of Ebnat and Kappel. It consists of the linear villages of Ebnat and Kappel and scattered settlements.

== Coat of arms ==
The blazon of the municipal coat of arms is Per bend sinister Or a Semi Unicorn couped rampant langued Gules and Azure a Chapel Argent roofed Gules.

== Demographics ==
Ebnat-Kappel has a population (as of 31 December 2020) of 5,007. As of 2007, about 14.8% of the population was made up of foreign nationals. Of the foreign population, (as of 2000), 59 are from Germany, 127 are from Italy, 322 are from ex-Yugoslavia, 16 are from Austria, 184 are from Turkey, and 97 are from another country. Over the last 10 years the population has decreased at a rate of -1.6%. Most of the population (as of 2000) speaks German (89.9%), with Turkish being second most common ( 2.5%) and Italian being third ( 1.8%). Of the Swiss national languages (as of 2000), 4,502 speak German, 12 people speak French, 92 people speak Italian, and 9 people speak Romansh.

The age distribution, as of 2000, in Ebnat-Kappel is; 584 children or 11.7% of the population are between 0 and 9 years old and 756 teenagers or 15.1% are between 10 and 19. Of the adult population, 579 people or 11.6% of the population are between 20 and 29 years old. 637 people or 12.7% are between 30 and 39, 697 people or 13.9% are between 40 and 49, and 607 people or 12.1% are between 50 and 59. The senior population distribution is 453 people or 9.0% of the population are between 60 and 69 years old, 413 people or 8.2% are between 70 and 79, there are 246 people or 4.9% who are between 80 and 89, and there are 35 people or 0.7% who are between 90 and 99.

In 2000 there were 609 persons (or 12.2% of the population) who were living alone in a private dwelling. There were 1,139 (or 22.7%) persons who were part of a couple (married or otherwise committed) without children, and 2,718 (or 54.3%) who were part of a couple with children. There were 238 (or 4.8%) people who lived in single parent home, while there are 26 persons who were adult children living with one or both parents, 20 persons who lived in a household made up of relatives, 20 who lived household made up of unrelated persons, and 237 who are either institutionalized or live in another type of collective housing.

In the 2007 federal election the most popular party was the SVP which received 40.9% of the vote. The next three most popular parties were the FDP (14.8%), the SP (14.7%) and the CVP (12.6%).

The entire Swiss population is generally well educated. In Ebnat-Kappel about 64.3% of the population (between age 25-64) have completed either non-mandatory upper secondary education or additional higher education (either university or a Fachhochschule). Out of the total population in Ebnat-Kappel, as of 2000, the highest education level completed by 1,297 people (25.9% of the population) was Primary, while 1,729 (34.5%) have completed Secondary, 373 (7.4%) have attended a Tertiary school, and 227 (4.5%) are not in school. The remainder did not answer this question.

The historical population is given in the following table:

year	Kappel population	Ebnat population
1824/27	1,995	1,726
1850/60	2,229	2,242
1900	2,187	2,657
1930/50	1,883	2,761
1960	1,968	3,011
year	Ebnat-Kappel	
1970	5,131	
2000	5,007	

== Sights ==
The village of Ebnat-Kappel and the Trempel are designated as part of the Inventory of Swiss Heritage Sites.

== Economy ==
As of 2007, Ebnat-Kappel had an unemployment rate of 1.49%. As of 2005, there were 207 people employed in the primary economic sector and about 99 businesses involved in this sector. 822 people are employed in the secondary sector and there are 63 businesses in this sector. 772 people are employed in the tertiary sector, with 136 businesses in this sector.

As of October 2009 the average unemployment rate was 3.3%. There were 290 businesses in the municipality of which 53 were involved in the secondary sector of the economy while 142 were involved in the third.

As of 2000 there were 1,374 residents who worked in the municipality, while 1,081 residents worked outside Ebnat-Kappel and 672 people commuted into the municipality for work.

== Religion ==
From the 2000 census, 1,393 or 27.8% are Roman Catholic, while 2,471 or 49.4% belonged to the Swiss Reformed Church. Of the rest of the population, there is 1 individual who belongs to the Christian Catholic faith, there are 45 individuals (or about 0.90% of the population) who belong to the Orthodox Church, and there are 209 individuals (or about 4.17% of the population) who belong to another Christian church. There are 452 (or about 9.03% of the population) who are Islamic. There are 23 individuals (or about 0.46% of the population) who belong to another church (not listed on the census), 253 (or about 5.05% of the population) belong to no church, are agnostic or atheist, and 160 individuals (or about 3.20% of the population) did not answer the question.

== Weather ==
Ebnat-Kappel has an average of 151.1 days of rain or snow per year and on average receives 1,818 mm (71.6 in) of precipitation. The wettest month is July during which time Ebnat-Kappel receives an average of 196 mm (7.7 in) of rain or snow. During this month there is precipitation for an average of 14.3 days. The driest month of the year is February with an average of 117 mm (4.6 in) of precipitation over 10.9 days.

Climate data for Ebnat-Kappel, elevation 623 m (2,044 ft), (1991–2020)
Month	Jan	Feb	Mar	Apr	May	Jun	Jul	Aug	Sep	Oct	Nov	Dec	Year
Mean daily maximum °C (°F)	3.1 (37.6)	4.6 (40.3)	9.2 (48.6)	13.8 (56.8)	17.9 (64.2)	21.4 (70.5)	23.3 (73.9)	23.0 (73.4)	18.4 (65.1)	13.7 (56.7)	7.7 (45.9)	3.8 (38.8)	13.3 (55.9)
Daily mean °C (°F)	−1.1 (30.0)	−0.1 (31.8)	3.8 (38.8)	7.8 (46.0)	12.1 (53.8)	15.7 (60.3)	17.4 (63.3)	16.9 (62.4)	12.7 (54.9)	8.5 (47.3)	3.3 (37.9)	−0.2 (31.6)	8.1 (46.6)
Mean daily minimum °C (°F)	−4.8 (23.4)	−4.7 (23.5)	−1.4 (29.5)	1.6 (34.9)	5.9 (42.6)	9.8 (49.6)	11.5 (52.7)	11.3 (52.3)	7.6 (45.7)	4.2 (39.6)	−0.4 (31.3)	−3.8 (25.2)	3.1 (37.6)
Average precipitation mm (inches)	131.6 (5.18)	117.1 (4.61)	142.2 (5.60)	121.4 (4.78)	177.1 (6.97)	182.6 (7.19)	196.0 (7.72)	194.8 (7.67)	151.9 (5.98)	122.1 (4.81)	129.3 (5.09)	152.0 (5.98)	1,818.1 (71.58)
Average snowfall cm (inches)	42 (17)	44 (17)	32 (13)	8 (3.1)	0 (0)	0 (0)	0 (0)	0 (0)	0 (0)	1 (0.4)	18 (7.1)	32 (13)	177 (70)
Average precipitation days (≥ 1.0 mm)	12.1	10.9	13.1	11.7	14.0	14.4	14.3	13.5	11.1	10.7	11.4	13.9	151.1
Average snowy days (≥ 1.0 cm)	6.8	6.1	5.0	1.9	0.2	0.0	0.0	0.0	0.0	0.2	2.9	5.9	29.0
Average relative humidity (%)	88	86	82	78	78	77	78	81	85	88	90	90	83
Source 1: NOAA
Source 2: MeteoSwiss

== See also ==
- Ebnat-Kappel railway station
