= Gommiswald =

- Municipality
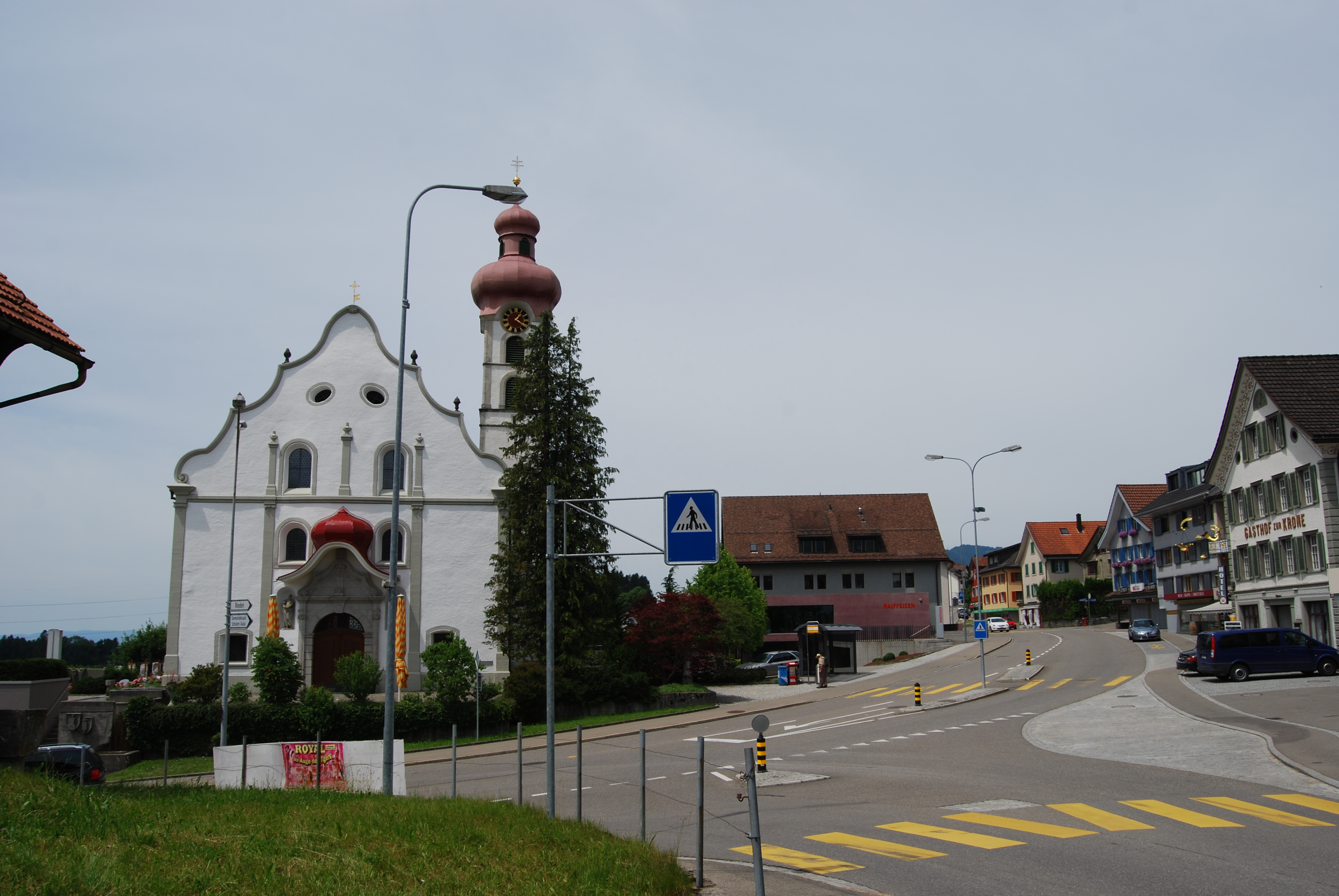

- Coat of arms
- Location of Gommiswald
- Location within Switzerland Location within Canton of St. Gallen
- Coordinates: 47°13′N 9°1′E
- Country: Switzerland
- Canton: St. Gallen
- District: See-Gaster

Government
  - Mayor: Peter Göldi

Area
  - Total: 11.86 km^{2} (4.58 sq mi)
- Elevation: 590 m (1,940 ft)

Population (Dec 2014)
  - Total: 4,973
  - Density: 419.3/km^{2} (1,086/sq mi)
- Time zone: UTC+01:00 (CET)
  - Summer (DST): UTC+02:00 (CEST)
- Postal code: 8737
- SFOS number: 3341
- ISO 3166 code: CH-SG
- Surrounded by: Ebnat-Kappel, Kaltbrunn, Uznach, Wattwil
- Website: gommiswald.ch

Gommiswald is a municipality in the Wahlkreis (constituency) of See-Gaster in the canton of St. Gallen in Switzerland. On 1 January 2013 the former municipalities of Rieden and Ernetschwil merged into the municipality of Gommiswald.

== History ==
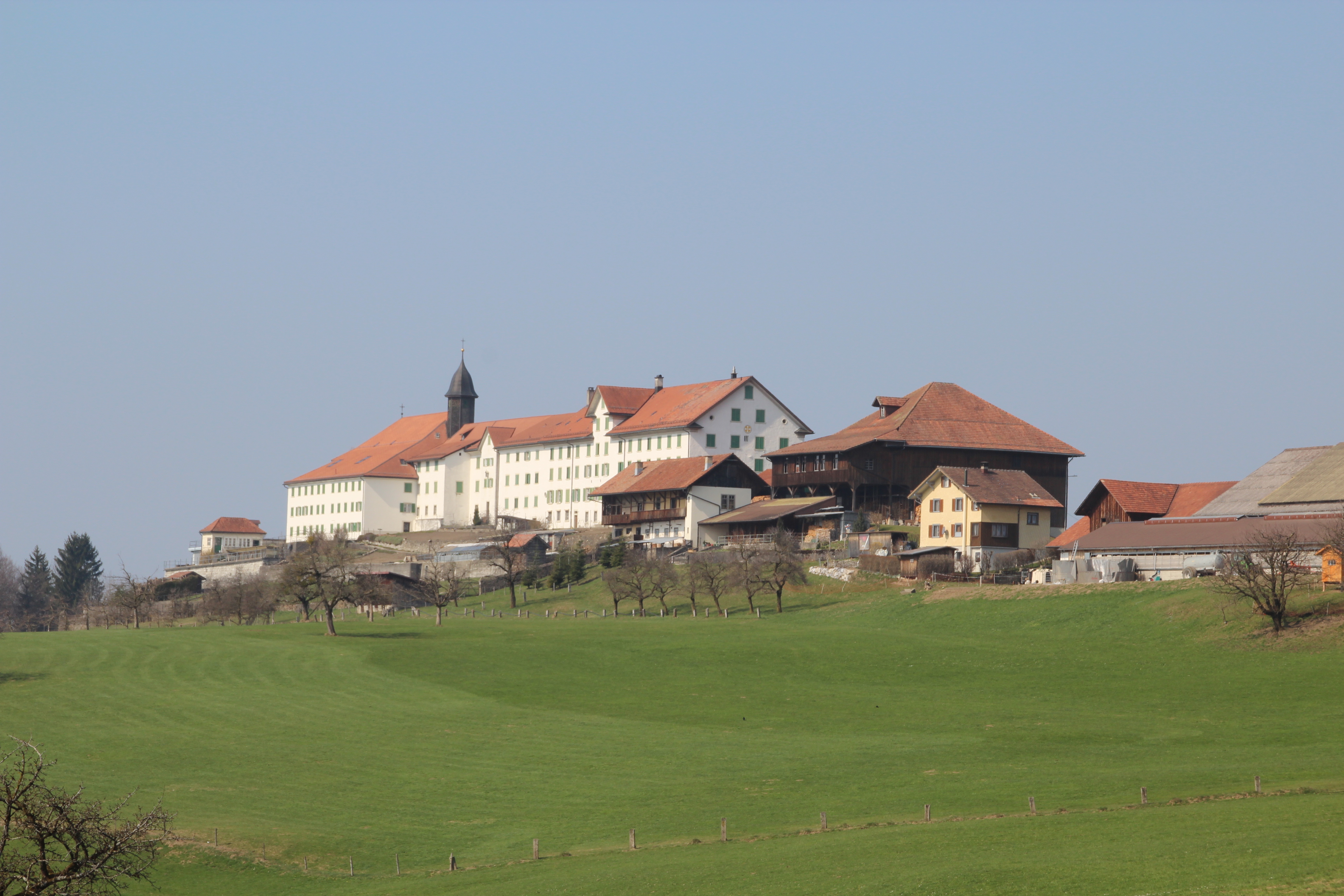
Berg Sion Monastery in Gommiswald

Aerial view from 100 m by Walter Mittelholzer (1919)

Gommiswald is first mentioned in 1178 as Göycheim though this comes from a 16th-century copy of the original. In 1440 it was mentioned as Göchams gewalt. The current village of Gommiswald was known as Gauen until the 18th century, when both Gauen and Gommiswald were used interchangeably. In 1913 the cantonal government directed that the name of Gommiswald would be the official name.

During the Early Middle Ages Schänis Abbey acquired the right to collect tithes in Gommiswald and the patronage rights over the village church. At around the same time, the village was part of the large parish of Benken and was part of the Diocese of Chur. Politically, by 1200, it was part of the Toggenburg County of Uznach. In 1439, three years after the death of the last Count of Toggenburg, Frederick VII of Toggenburg, Schwyz and Glarus established a joint condominium over the County of Uznach. In 1500, the residents of the village broke away from the Benken parish and built their own parish church. In 1556, they bought the tithe rights over the village away from Schänis Abbey. In 1676 the Felix and Regula Chapel was rebuilt on the Üetliburg hill. Almost a century later, in 1761, the priest Joseph Helg founded the Premonstratensian Mount Zion Abbey near the chapel. Following the 1798 French invasion, the County of Uznach was finally freed from joint Schwyz and Glarus control.

The construction of the Kaltbrunn-Ricken road in 1785-88 and the Uznach road in 1830 connected the village to the surrounding towns. In 1803 Gommiswald and Ernetschwil formed a short lived political municipality, but separated again in 1807. Gommiswald remained without industry until 1932 when the Wattefabrik Kistler opened. The factory employed 90 workers in 1979 and 40 in 2002. In 1956 Gommiswald, Ernetschwil and Rieden formed a secondary school district. Since 1960, the population has doubled and Gommiswald has developed into a residential and recreational community with new commercial buildings and many apartments, leading to an increase of commuting and urban sprawl.

Rieden is first mentioned in 1045 as Rieta.

Ernetschwil is first mentioned in 885 as Eidwarteswilare.

== Geography ==
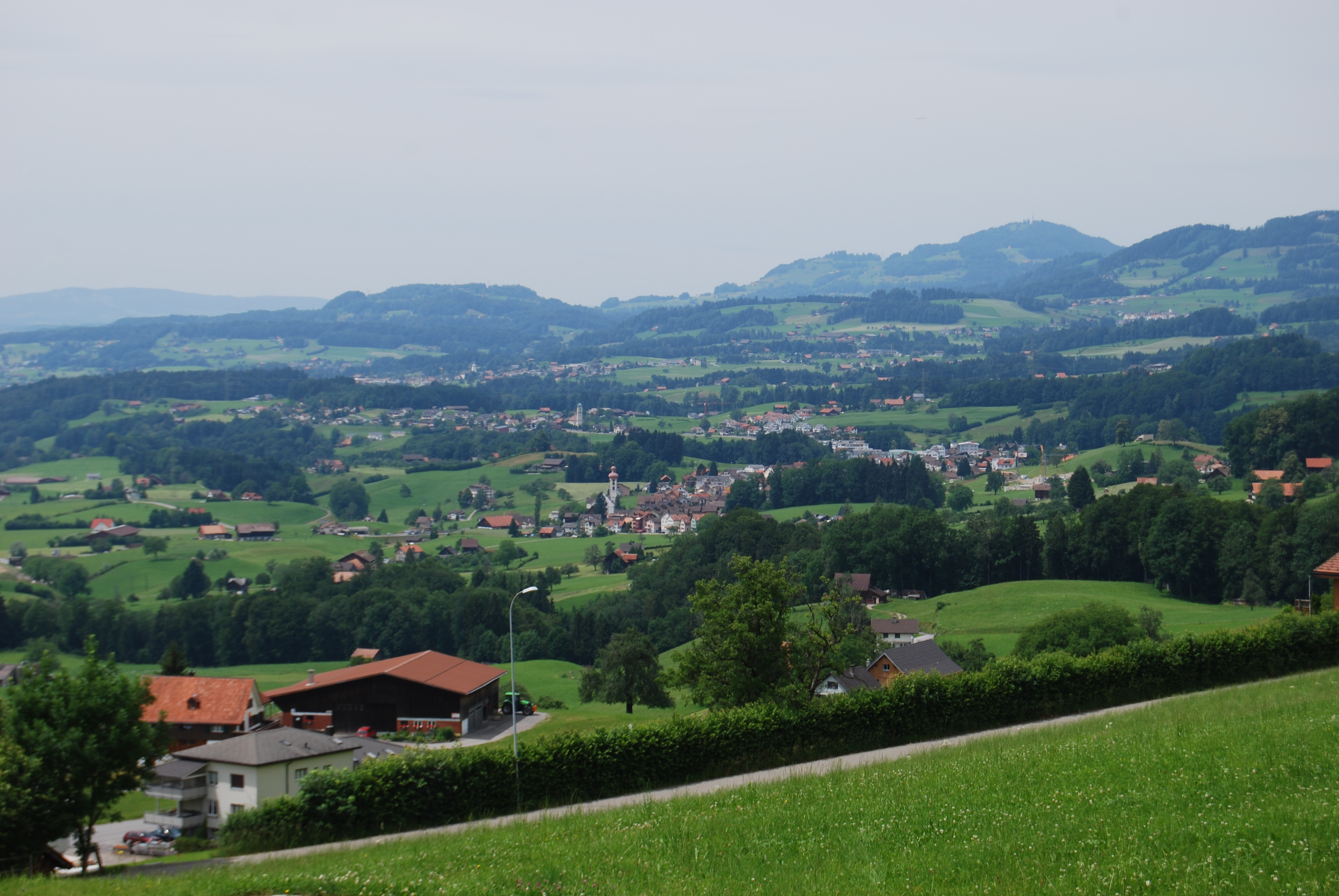
View from Rieden to Gommiswald and Ernetschwil

After the 2013 merger, Gommiswald had a total area of 33.59 km^{2} (12.97 sq mi).

Before the merger, Gommiswald had an area, as of 2006, of 11.9 km^{2} (4.6 sq mi). Of this area, 42.3% is used for agricultural purposes, while 49.2% is forested. Of the rest of the land, 8.4% is settled (buildings or roads) and the remainder (0.2%) is non-productive (rivers or lakes).

The municipality is located in the See-Gaster Wahlkreis on a high ridge between the Linth valley and the Regelstein valley. It consists of the village of Gommiswald/Gauen and the hamlets of Attenbach, Giegen, Ottenhofen, Ramendingen, Schubingen and Üetliburg.

== Coat of arms ==
The blazon of the municipal coat of arms is Gules issuant from base a Hand Or with three fingers raised in blessing clad Sable with a Cross pattee Argent on cuff.

The hand displays the three fingers with which oaths are traditionally sworn in Switzerland. The original Rütlischwur or founding oath of the Swiss Confederation is depicted with each of the three representatives of the three forest cantons holding up the thumb and two fingers for the oath.

== Demographics ==
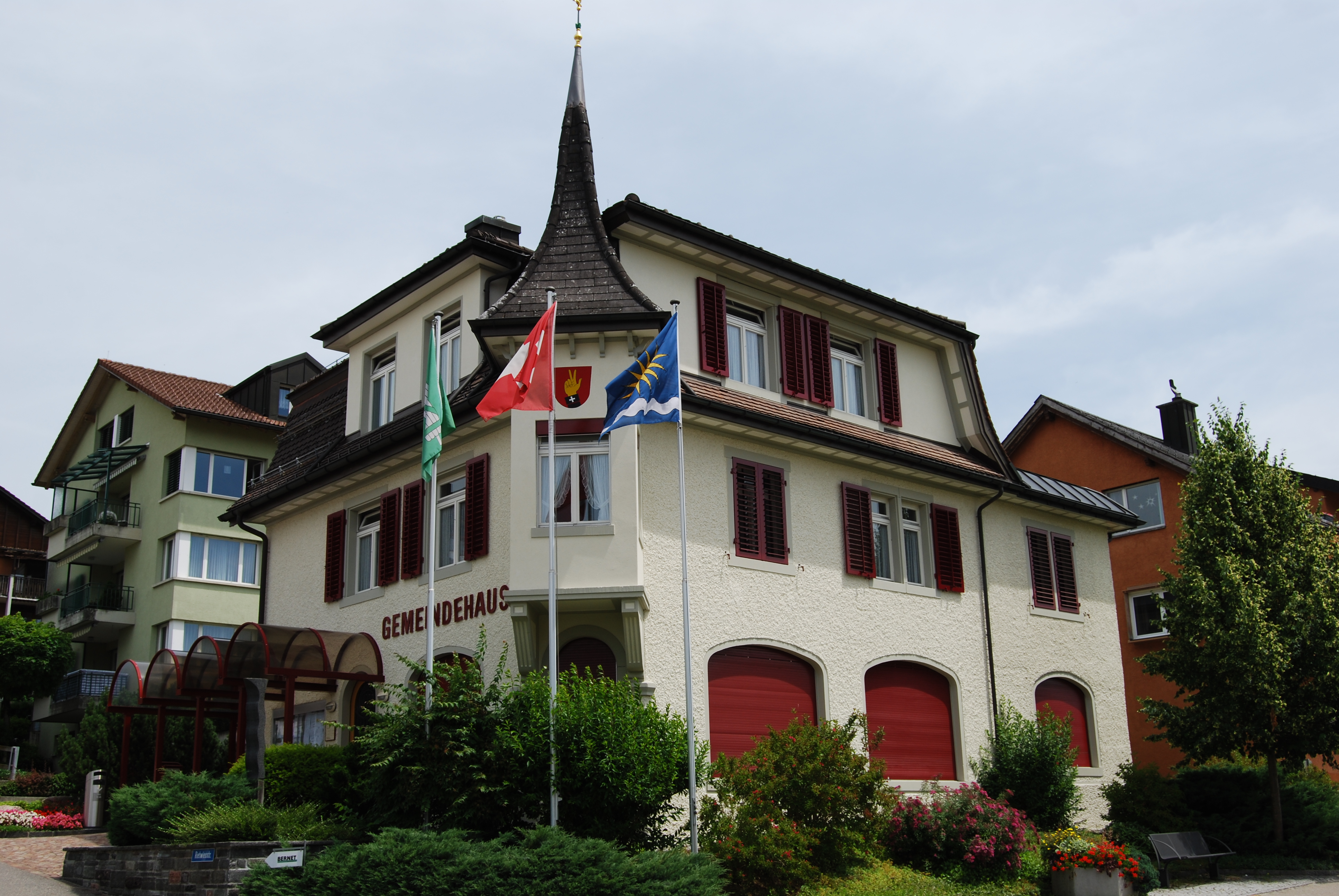
Town hall in Gommiswald

Gommiswald has a population (as of 31 December 2020) of 5,316. As of 2007, about 13.6% of the population was made up of foreign nationals. Of the foreign population, (as of 2000), 50 are from Germany, 43 are from Italy, 152 are from ex-Yugoslavia, 15 are from Austria, 21 are from Turkey, and 49 are from another country. Over the last 10 years the population has grown at a rate of 5.2%. Most of the population (as of 2000) speaks German (92.1%), with Albanian being second most common (3.2%) and Italian being third (1.3%). Of the Swiss national languages (as of 2000), 2,425 speak German, 11 people speak French, 35 people speak Italian, and 5 people speak Romansh.

The age distribution, as of 2000, in Gommiswald is; 376 children or 14.3% of the population are between 0 and 9 years old and 358 teenagers or 13.6% are between 10 and 19. Of the adult population, 291 people or 11.0% of the population are between 20 and 29 years old. 444 people or 16.9% are between 30 and 39, 395 people or 15.0% are between 40 and 49, and 294 people or 11.2% are between 50 and 59. The senior population distribution is 246 people or 9.3% of the population are between 60 and 69 years old, 163 people or 6.2% are between 70 and 79, there are 61 people or 2.3% who are between 80 and 89, and there are 6 people or 0.2% who are between 90 and 99.

In 2000 there were 271 persons (or 10.3% of the population) who were living alone in a private dwelling. There were 614 (or 23.3%) persons who were part of a couple (married or otherwise committed) without children, and 1,523 (or 57.8%) who were part of a couple with children. There were 124 (or 4.7%) people who lived in single parent home, while there are 20 persons who were adult children living with one or both parents, 4 persons who lived in a household made up of relatives, 22 who lived household made up of unrelated persons, and 56 who are either institutionalized or live in another type of collective housing.

In the 2007 federal election the most popular party was the SVP which received 46.5% of the vote. The next three most popular parties were the CVP (22.2%), the FDP (10.1%) and the SP (8.2%).

In Gommiswald about 70.6% of the population (between age 25–64) have completed either non-mandatory upper secondary education or additional higher education (either university or a Fachhochschule). Out of the total population in Gommiswald, as of 2000, the highest education level completed by 570 people (21.6% of the population) was Primary, while 952 (36.1%) have completed Secondary, 267 (10.1%) have attended a Tertiary school, and 94 (3.6%) are not in school. The remainder did not answer this question.

== Historic Population ==
The historical population is given in the following chart:

== Economy ==
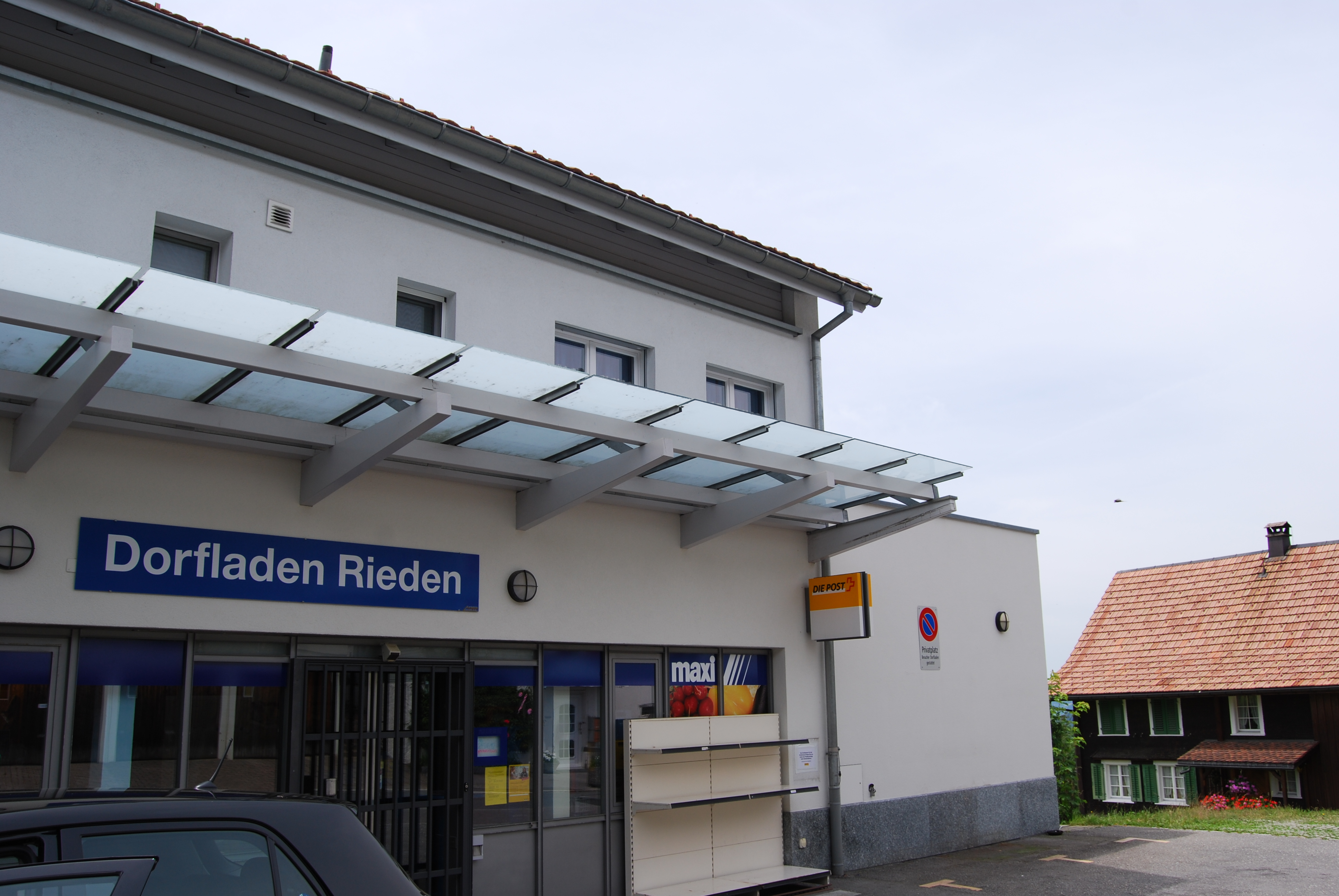
Village store in Rieden village

As of 2007, Gommiswald had an unemployment rate of 1.27%. As of 2005, there were 87 people employed in the primary economic sector and about 37 businesses involved in this sector. 322 people are employed in the secondary sector and there are 27 businesses in this sector. 365 people are employed in the tertiary sector, with 79 businesses in this sector.

As of October 2009 the average unemployment rate was 2.6%. There were 133 businesses in the municipality of which 26 were involved in the secondary sector of the economy while 73 were involved in the third.

As of 2000 there were 441 residents who worked in the municipality, while 881 residents worked outside Gommiswald and 294 people commuted into the municipality for work.

== Religion ==
From the 2000 census, 1,711 or 65.0% are Roman Catholic, while 485 or 18.4% belonged to the Swiss Reformed Church. Of the rest of the population, there are 25 individuals (or about 0.95% of the population) who belong to the Orthodox Church, and there are 31 individuals (or about 1.18% of the population) who belong to another Christian church. There are 2 individuals (or about 0.08% of the population) who are Jewish, and 80 (or about 3.04% of the population) who are Islamic. There are 4 individuals (or about 0.15% of the population) who belong to another church (not listed on the census), 184 (or about 6.99% of the population) belong to no church, are agnostic or atheist, and 112 individuals (or about 4.25% of the population) did not answer the question.

== Sights ==
The Uetliburg/Berg Sion near the village of Gommiswald is designated as part of the Inventory of Swiss Heritage Sites.
