= Ebnat-Kappel railway station =

Railway station in Switzerland

Ebnat-Kappel
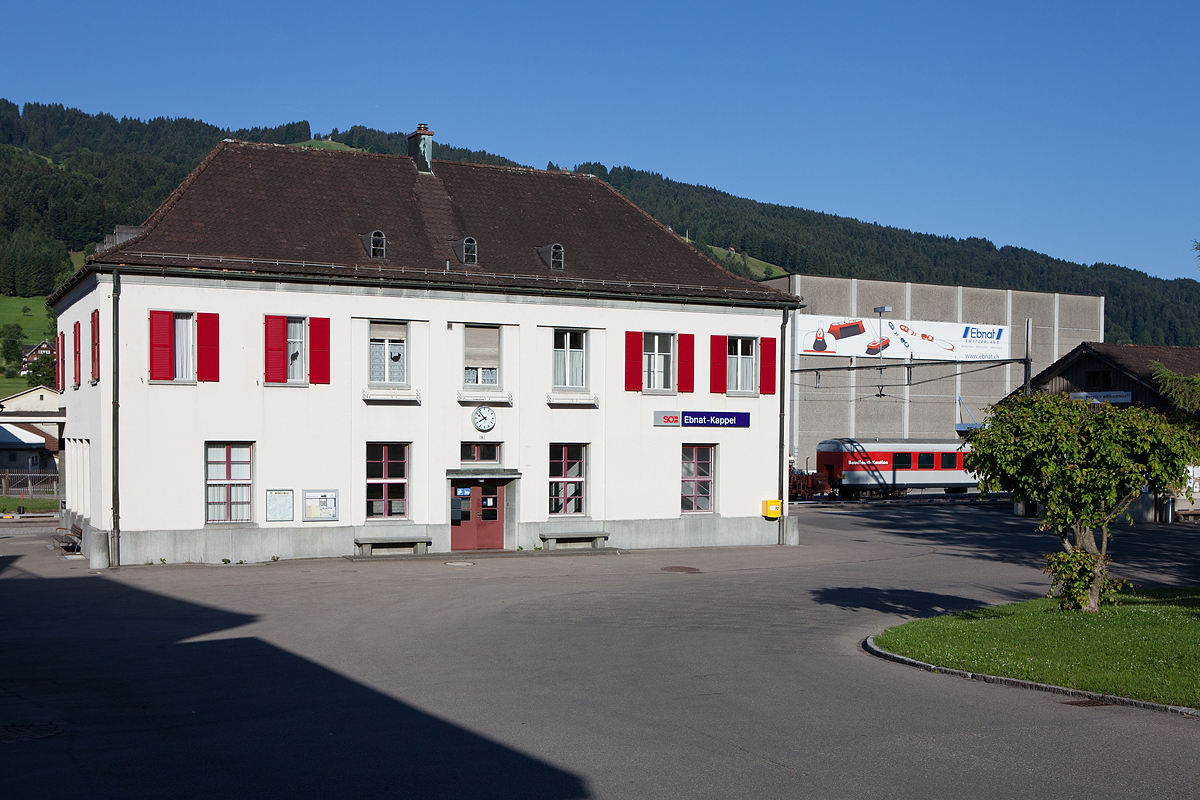
- The Ebnat-Kappel station building in 2011

General information
- Location: Ebnat-Kappel; Switzerland
- Coordinates: 47°15′49.4″N 9°07′15.9″E
- Elevation: 630 m (2,070 ft)
- Owner: Südostbahn
- Line: Bodensee–Toggenburg
- Platforms: 1 side platform
- Tracks: 3
- Train operators: Thurbo
- Connections
- Bus: BLWE bus route 770; PostAuto bus route 790

Other information
- Fare zone: 366 / 974 (Tarifverbund Ostwind)

Services
Preceding station	St. Gallen S-Bahn	Following station
Krummenau towards Nesslau-Neu St. Johann	S2	Wattwil towards Altstätten SG
Location
- Location within Switzerland Location within Canton of St. Gallen

Ebnat-Kappel railway station (German: Bahnhof Ebnat-Kappel) is a railway station in Ebnat-Kappel, in the Swiss canton of St. Gallen. It is an intermediate station on the Bodensee–Toggenburg railway and is served by local trains only.

== Services ==
Ebnat-Kappel is served by the S2 of the St. Gallen S-Bahn:

- S2: hourly service over the Bodensee–Toggenburg railway between Nesslau-Neu St. Johann and Altstätten SG, via St. Gallen.

== See also ==
- Rail transport in Switzerland
