= See-Gaster =

See-Gaster Wahlkreis See-Gaster
- Constituency
- Coordinates: 47°13′36″N 8°49′06″E
- Country: Switzerland
- Canton: St. Gallen

Area
  - Total: 246.16 km^{2} (95.04 sq mi)

Population (December 2020)
  - Total: 68,425
  - Density: 277.97/km^{2} (719.94/sq mi)
- Time zone: UTC+1 (CET)
  - Summer (DST): UTC+2 (CEST)
- Municipalities: 10

See-Gaster is a constituency (Wahlkreis) in the canton of St. Gallen in Switzerland. The Wahlkreis (SFOS number 1726) has been established on June 10, 2001, with an area of 246.16 km^{2} (95.04 sq mi).

It was formed from the former See and Gaster districts in 2001.

== History ==
The name Gaster is from Latin castrum "castle"; a it is first recorded in 1230. The Gaster districts corresponded to the historical county of Windegg. The See district corresponded to the historical counties of Rapperswil and Uznach.

In the medieval period, the area was owned by the counts of Lenzburg, from 1172 by Kyburg, from 1269 by Habsburg, from 1406 by Toggenburg and from 1436 again briefly by Habsburg, until 1438 when duke Frederick gave it to Schwyz and Glarus as a condominium. Schänis was administrative center and site of the Landsgemeinde of Gaster. Rapperswil was ruled by its own counts until its destruction in 1350, after which it fell under Habsburg rule, until it became a protectorate of the Swiss Confederacy in 1464. In 1798, Gaster became a district of the canton of Linth in the Helvetic Republic, and was inherited by the canton of St. Gallen in 1803. The historical county of Uznach was separated from Gaster in 1831 to form the See district, until the reunification of the two districts in 2001.

== Demographics ==
See-Gaster Wahlkreis has a population of 68,425 (as of 31 December 2020). Of the foreign population, (as of 2000), 919 are from Germany, 2,073 are from Italy, 3,867 are from ex-Yugoslavia, 278 are from Austria, 817 are from Turkey, and 2,206 are from another country. Of the population (as of 2000), 51,263 speak German, 277 people speak French, 1,420 people speak Italian, and 130 people speak Romansh.

The age distribution, as of 2000, in Region See-Gaster is; 7,257 children or 12.5% of the population are between 0 and 9 years old and 7,776 teenagers or 13.4% are between 10 and 19. Of the adult population, 7,432 people or 12.8% of the population are between 20 and 29 years old. 9,522 people or 16.4% are between 30 and 39, 8,341 people or 14.4% are between 40 and 49, and 7,130 people or 12.3% are between 50 and 59. The senior population distribution is 5,075 people or 8.8% of the population are between 60 and 69 years old, 3,530 people or 6.1% are between 70 and 79, there are 1,536 people or 2.7% who are between 80 and 89, and there are 303 people or 0.5% who are between 90 and 99, and 4 people who are 100 or more.

In 2000 there were 6,895 persons (or 11.9% of the population) who were living alone in a private dwelling. There were 12,907 (or 22.3%) persons who were part of a couple (married or otherwise committed) without children, and 32,227 (or 55.7%) who were part of a couple with children. There were 2,952 (or 5.1%) people who lived in single parent home, while there are 323 persons who were adult children living with one or both parents, 252 persons who lived in a household made up of relatives, 592 who lived household made up of unrelated persons, and 1,758 who are either institutionalized or live in another type of collective housing.

Out of the total population in the region, as of 2000, the highest education level completed by 12,282 people (21.2% of the population) was Primary, while 21,312 (36.8%) have completed Secondary, 6,561 (11.3%) have attended a Tertiary school, and 2,529 (4.4%) are not in school. The remainder did not answer this question.

As of October 2009 the average unemployment rate was 3.3%.

From the 2000 census, 35,391 or 61.1% are Roman Catholic, while 11,831 or 20.4% belonged to the Swiss Reformed Church. Of the rest of the population, there are 34 individuals (or about 0.06% of the population) who belong to the denomination of the Christian Catholic Church of Switzerland, there are 1,218 individuals (or about 2.10% of the population) who belong to the Orthodox Church, and there are 932 individuals (or about 1.61% of the population) who belong to another church. There are 21 individuals (or about 0.04% of the population) who are Jewish, and 2,421 (or about 4.18% of the population) who are Islamic. There are 583 individuals (or about 1.01% of the population) who belong to another church (not listed on the census), 3,644 (or about 6.29% of the population) belong to no church, are agnostic or atheist, and 1,831 individuals (or about 3.16% of the population) did not answer the question.

== Municipalities ==
On 1 January 2013 the former municipalities of Rieden and Ernetschwil merged into the municipality of Gommiswald and the former municipalities of Goldingen and St. Gallenkappel merged into Eschenbach.

Coat of arms	Municipality	Population (31 December 2020)	Area in km^{2}	SFOS number
Amden	Amden	1,876	43.48	3311
Benken	Benken	2,994	16.48	3312
Eschenbach	Eschenbach	9,614	54.89	3342
Gommiswald	Gommiswald	5,316	33.59	3341
Kaltbrunn	Kaltbrunn	4,976	18.68	3313
Rapperswil-Jona	Rapperswil-Jona	27,483	22.17	3340
Schänis	Schänis	3,923	39.90	3315
Schmerikon	Schmerikon	3,971	4.15	3338
Uznach	Uznach	6,519	7.55	3339
Weesen	Weesen	1,753	5.39	3316
	Total (10)	68,425	246.16	1726

== See also ==
- Municipalities of the canton of St. Gallen
