= Maria Josefa Karolina Brader =

Blessed Karolina Brader Zahner
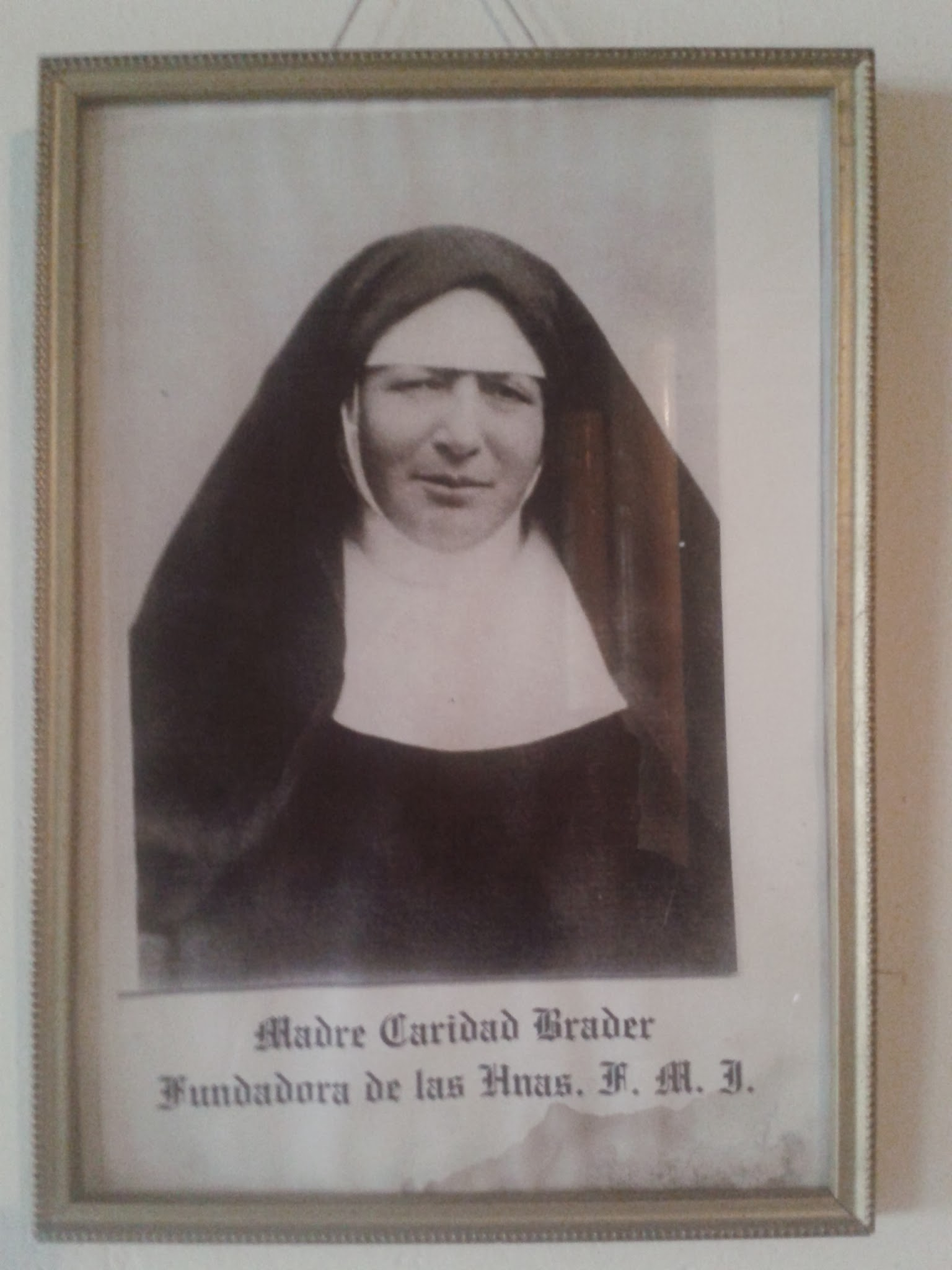

Virgin
- Born: 15 August 1860; Kaltbrunn, Sankt Gallen, Switzerland
- Died: 27 February 1943 (aged 82); Pasto, Nariño, Colombia
- Venerated in: Roman Catholic Church
- Beatified: 23 March 2003, Saint Peter's Square, Vatican City by Pope John Paul II
- Feast: 27 February

Maria Josefa Karolina Brader (15 August 1860 – 27 February 1943), also known by her religious name Maria Caridad of the Holy Spirit, was a Swiss religious sister who founded the Franciscan Sisters of Mary Immaculate. Brader served as a member of the missions in Ecuador for a brief period of time before being transferred to Colombia where she served as a catechist and evangelizer for the remainder of her life.

Brader's canonization cause commenced on 24 October 1985 (she was titled as a Servant of God) and she was later declared Venerable on 28 June 1999 before Pope John Paul II beatified Brader on 23 March 2003 in Saint Peter's Square.

== Life ==
Maria Josefa Karolina Brader was born in Kaltbrunn in the St. Gallen canton on 15 August 1860 as the sole child of Joseph Sebastian Brader and Karolina Zahner. Brader was baptized on 16 August 1860.

Brader was an intelligent child who excelled in her studies while at school in Kaltbrunn and she received the best education that her mother attempted to provide her with. There were high expectations for her future but she decided not to go through with further studies in favor of pursuing her call to the religious life. Brader entered a Franciscan convent at Maria Hilf in Altstätten on 1 October 1880 that the Sisters of the Third Order Regular of Saint Francis managed. Brader was clothed in the habit on 1 March 1881 – in which she was given a new name – and made her final vows on 22 August 1882. Her mother's initial opposition faded after her mother wanted Brader to remain at home due to being a widow and Brader being the sole child she had.

Following her profession she was assigned to serve as a teacher. Brader volunteered to be one of the first six missionaries sent to work in Chone in Ecuador in 1888. Maria Bernarda Bütler was the head of the group and selected Brader herself and of that decision made known the fact that Brader "... will be able to render great services to the mission". The missionaries set off on 19 June 1888 and arrived that same month. Brader worked in Ecuador until 1893 as a catechist to children and as a teacher. Her superiors then transferred her in 1893 to Tùquerres in Colombia to teach the poor and the outcast.

On 31 March 1893 she founded her own order – with the backing of the German priest Reinaldo Herbrand – in order to prepare additional missionaries that saw an influx of Swiss women before Colombians began to join. Brader served as the superior general for her new order in two terms from 1893 until 1919 and then again from 1928 until 1940. Her order received diocesan approval on 6 September 1893 while later being aggregated to the Order of Friars Minor Capuchin on 17 November 1906. It received the decree of praise from Pope Pius XI on 25 November 1922 and later went on to receive full papal approval in 1933 from Pius XI.

Brader died in 1943 and when the news of her death spread the people visited her remains in droves to offer their respects to a woman hailed as a saint; her final words were to her nurse and she said: "Jesus ... I die ...". Before her death she said to her fellow sisters "I'm leaving" and urged them to continue the good work she began. Her funeral was celebrated on 2 March 1943 about a week following her death. There were a total of 614 religious in 103 houses as of 2005.

== Beatification ==
The beatification process opened on 24 October 1985 after Brader became titled as a Servant of God once the Congregation for the Causes of Saints issued the official "nihil obstat" (nothing against) to the cause which allowed for the inauguration of the diocesan process that concluded not long after. The process received formal validation on 1 July 1991 from the C.C.S. once all documentation from the diocesan process was shipped in boxes to the department in Rome.

The postulation later submitted the Positio to the C.C.S. in 1992 and it allowed for theologians to vote in favor of the cause on 29 January 1999. The cardinal and bishop members of the C.C.S. met and also approved the cause on 4 May 1999. Brader was named as Venerable on 28 June 1999 after Pope John Paul II confirmed that the late religious had lived a life of heroic virtue.

The miracle needed for her to be beatified was investigated in the diocese of its origin and received validation in Rome on 20 November 1998 to which medical experts and theologians met to approve the cause; the C.C.S. issued their own approval to the miracle on 1 October 2002. John Paul II approved the miracle on 20 December 2002 and beatified Brader in Saint Peter's Square on 23 March 2003.
