= Uznach =

- Municipality
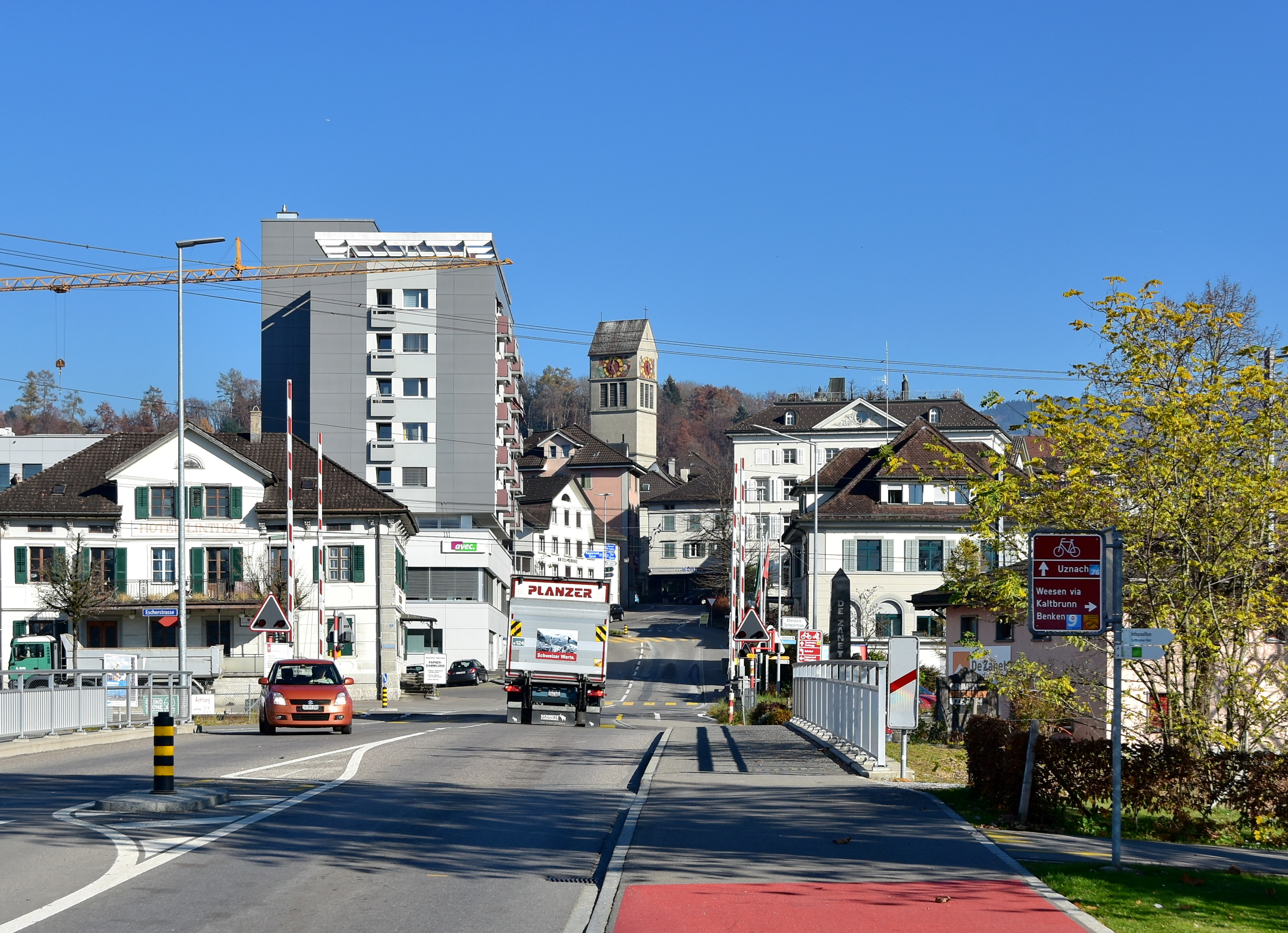

- Flag Coat of arms
- Location of Uznach
- Location within Switzerland Location within Canton of St. Gallen
- Coordinates: 47°14′N 8°59′E
- Country: Switzerland
- Canton: St. Gallen
- District: See-Gaster

Government
  - Mayor (list): Diego Forrer die Mitte

Area
  - Total: 7.55 km^{2} (2.92 sq mi)
- Elevation: 415 m (1,362 ft)

Population (December 2020)
  - Total: 6,519
  - Density: 863/km^{2} (2,240/sq mi)
- Time zone: UTC+01:00 (CET)
  - Summer (DST): UTC+02:00 (CEST)
- Postal code: 8730
- SFOS number: 3339
- ISO 3166 code: CH-SG
- Surrounded by: Benken, Ernetschwil, Eschenbach, Gommiswald, Kaltbrunn, Sankt Gallenkappel, Schmerikon, Tuggen (SZ)
- Website: uznach.ch

Uznach is a municipality in the Wahlkreis (constituency) of See-Gaster in the canton of St. Gallen in Switzerland.

== History ==
Uznach is first mentioned in 741 as Uzinaa in a grant from a noble lady at Benken Abbey to the Abbey of Saint Gall. It was also mentioned later as both Uzinaha and Uzzinriuda.

In the late 12th Century, the village was transferred from the Abbey of St. Gallen to the Counts of Toggenburg. Between 1180 and 1195 Diethelm VI. married Guta of Rapperswil and received as dowry the county of Uznach and a rose from the crest of Rapperswil. From their castle in Uznach, the Toggenburgs raided trade caravans from Zürich until 1268 when the castle was conquered and destroyed by Rudolf von Habsburg.

Following the extinction of the Toggenburg line in 1436, the Old Zürich War broke out between the canton of Zürich and the other seven cantons of the Old Swiss Confederacy over the Toggenburg inheritance. The war lasted from 1436 until 1450 and ended with Zurich being brought back into the Confederation.

In 1529, a Reformation preacher was arrested in Uznach by Schwyz troops. This led to the outbreak of the First War of Kappel. Two years later the Second War of Kappel broke out and Uznach was again attacked by Zurich.

== Geography ==
Uznach has an area, as of 2006, of 7.6 km^{2} (2.9 sq mi). Of this area, 47.1% is used for agricultural purposes, while 24.3% is forested. Of the rest of the land, 23.3% is settled (buildings or roads) and the remainder (5.3%) is non-productive (rivers or lakes).

== Coat of arms ==
The blazon of the municipal coat of arms is Gules a Rose Argent barbed seeded slipped and leaved Vert.

== Demographics ==
Uznach has a population (as of 31 December 2020) of 6,519. As of 2007, about 26.2% of the population was made up of foreign nationals. Of the foreign population, (as of 2000), 58 are from Germany, 275 are from Italy, 642 are from ex-Yugoslavia, 12 are from Austria, 116 are from Turkey, and 305 are from another country. Over the last 10 years the population has grown at a rate of 5.2%. Most of the population (as of 2000) speaks German (83.6%), with Albanian being second most common ( 3.8%) and Italian being third ( 3.3%). Of the Swiss national languages (as of 2000), 4,486 speak German, 14 people speak French, 176 people speak Italian, and 22 people speak Romansh.

The age distribution, as of 2000, in Uznach is; 755 children or 14.1% of the population are between 0 and 9 years old and 749 teenagers or 14.0% are between 10 and 19. Of the adult population, 664 people or 12.4% of the population are between 20 and 29 years old. 816 people or 15.2% are between 30 and 39, 815 people or 15.2% are between 40 and 49, and 582 people or 10.8% are between 50 and 59. The senior population distribution is 437 people or 8.1% of the population are between 60 and 69 years old, 358 people or 6.7% are between 70 and 79, there are 153 people or 2.8% who are between 80 and 89, and there are 39 people or 0.7% who are between 90 and 99, and 1 person who is 100 or more.

In 2000 there were 532 persons (or 9.9% of the population) who were living alone in a private dwelling. There were 1,078 (or 20.1%) persons who were part of a couple (married or otherwise committed) without children, and 3,240 (or 60.3%) who were part of a couple with children. There were 220 (or 4.1%) people who lived in single parent home, while there are 26 persons who were adult children living with one or both parents, 27 persons who lived in a household made up of relatives, 33 who lived household made up of unrelated persons, and 213 who are either institutionalized or live in another type of collective housing.

In the 2007 federal election the most popular party was the SVP which received 37.6% of the vote. The next three most popular parties were the CVP (24.4%), the SP (12.5%) and the FDP (10.7%).

In Uznach about 62.6% of the population (between age 25–64) have completed either non-mandatory upper secondary education or additional higher education (either university or a Fachhochschule). Out of the total population in Uznach, as of 2000, the highest education level completed by 1,184 people (22.1% of the population) was Primary, while 1,773 (33.0%) have completed their secondary education, 483 (9.0%) have attended a Tertiary school, and 334 (6.2%) are not in school. The remainder did not answer this question.

== Economy ==
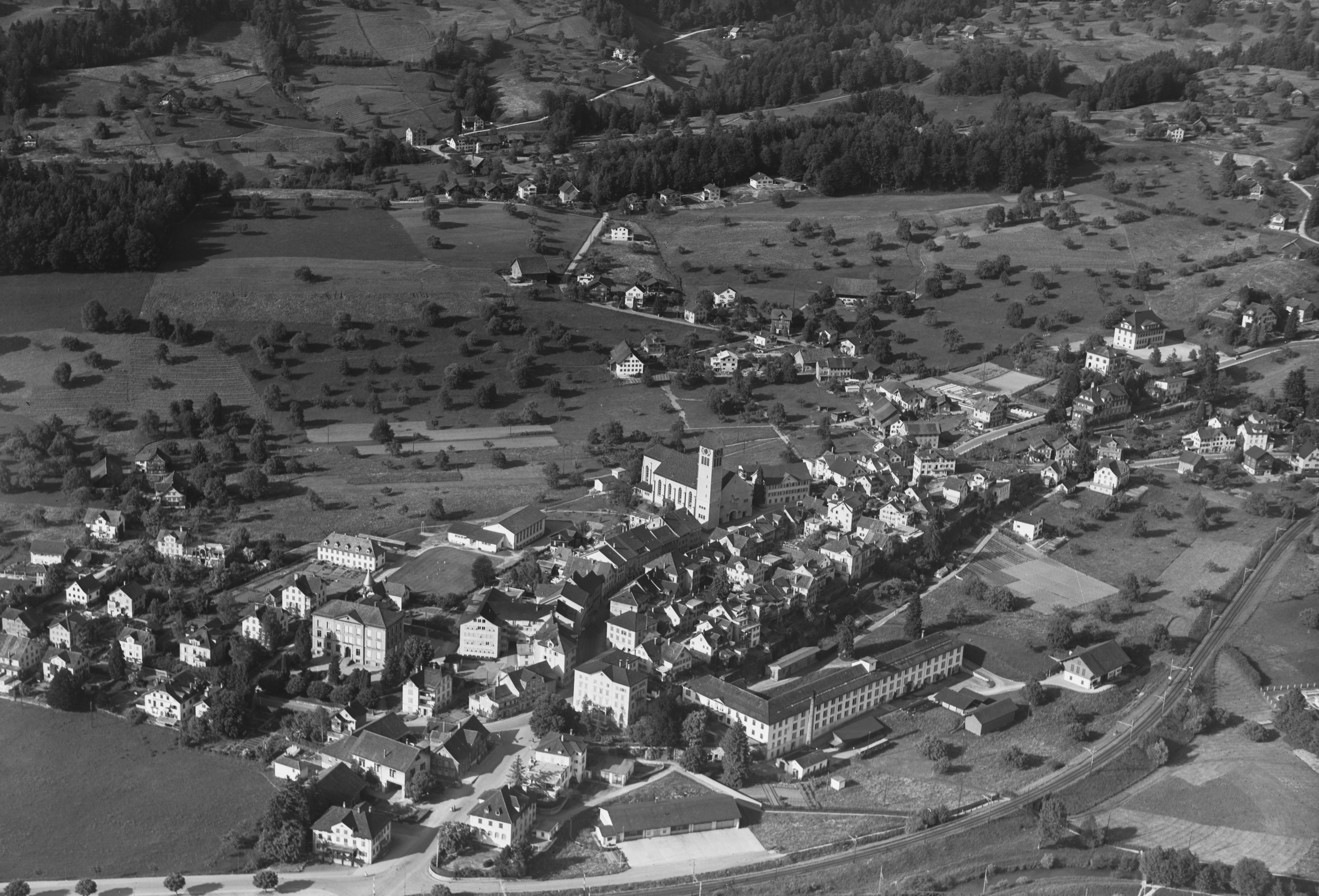
Areal image of Uznach, 1953

As of 2007, Uznach had an unemployment rate of 1.62%. As of 2005, there were 42 people employed in the primary economic sector and about 19 businesses involved in this sector. 1,253 people are employed in the secondary sector and there are 72 businesses in this sector. 2,118 people are employed in the tertiary sector, with 227 businesses in this sector.

As of October 2009 the average unemployment rate was 4.5%. There were 311 businesses in the municipality of which 71 were involved in the secondary sector of the economy while 219 were involved in the third.

As of 2000 there were 1,406 residents who worked in the municipality, while 1,329 residents worked outside Uznach and 2,124 people commuted into the municipality for work.

== Religion ==
From the 2000 census, 3,691 or 68.7% are Roman Catholic, while 695 or 12.9% belonged to the Swiss Reformed Church. Of the rest of the population, there are 2 individuals (or about 0.04% of the population) who belong to the Christian Catholic faith, there are 185 individuals (or about 3.45% of the population) who belong to the Orthodox Church, and there are 80 individuals (or about 1.49% of the population) who belong to another Christian church. There are 279 (or about 5.20% of the population) who are Islamic. There are 84 individuals (or about 1.56% of the population) who belong to another church (not listed on the census), 190 (or about 3.54% of the population) belong to no church, are agnostic or atheist, and 163 individuals (or about 3.04% of the population) did not answer the question.

== Transport ==
Uznach railway station is served by the inter-regional Voralpen Express, which links Lucerne and St. Gallen via Rapperswil and Herisau, and by a Regio service from Rapperswil to Linthal. It is also the terminus of St. Gallen S-Bahn service S4 from St. Gallen. All three trains run hourly, combining to provide half-hourly services to Rapperswil and St. Gallen.

== Notable people ==
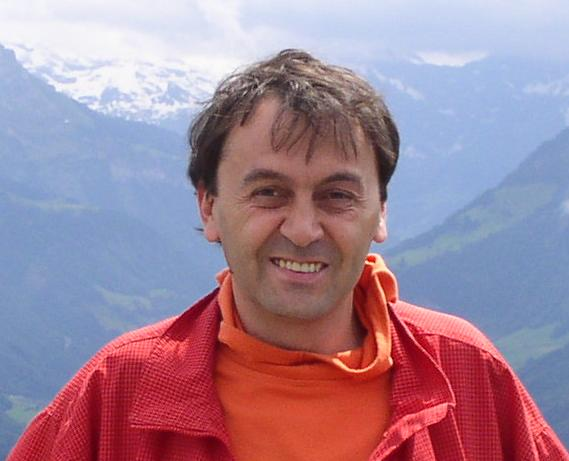
Giuseppe Melfi, 2004

- Kurt Aepli (1914–2002 in Uznach) a Swiss silversmith, a designer of fine jewelry and implements and professional educator
- Werner Kaegi (1926–2024) a Swiss electronic music composer, musicologist and educator
- Alfredo Battistini (1953–2008) an Italian-Swiss sculptor, illustrator and athlete
- Giuseppe Melfi (born 1967) an Italo-Swiss mathematician
- Yves Rüedi (born 1976) a Judge of the Federal Supreme Court of Switzerland and
- Jean-Claude Scherrer (born 1978) a professional tennis player
- Selina Kuster (born 1991) a Swiss football defender
- Tom Bohli (born 1994) a Swiss professional racing cyclist
- Simon Otto (born 1973) a Swiss director, animator and storyboard artist
