= Rieden, Switzerland =

Rieden
- Former municipality
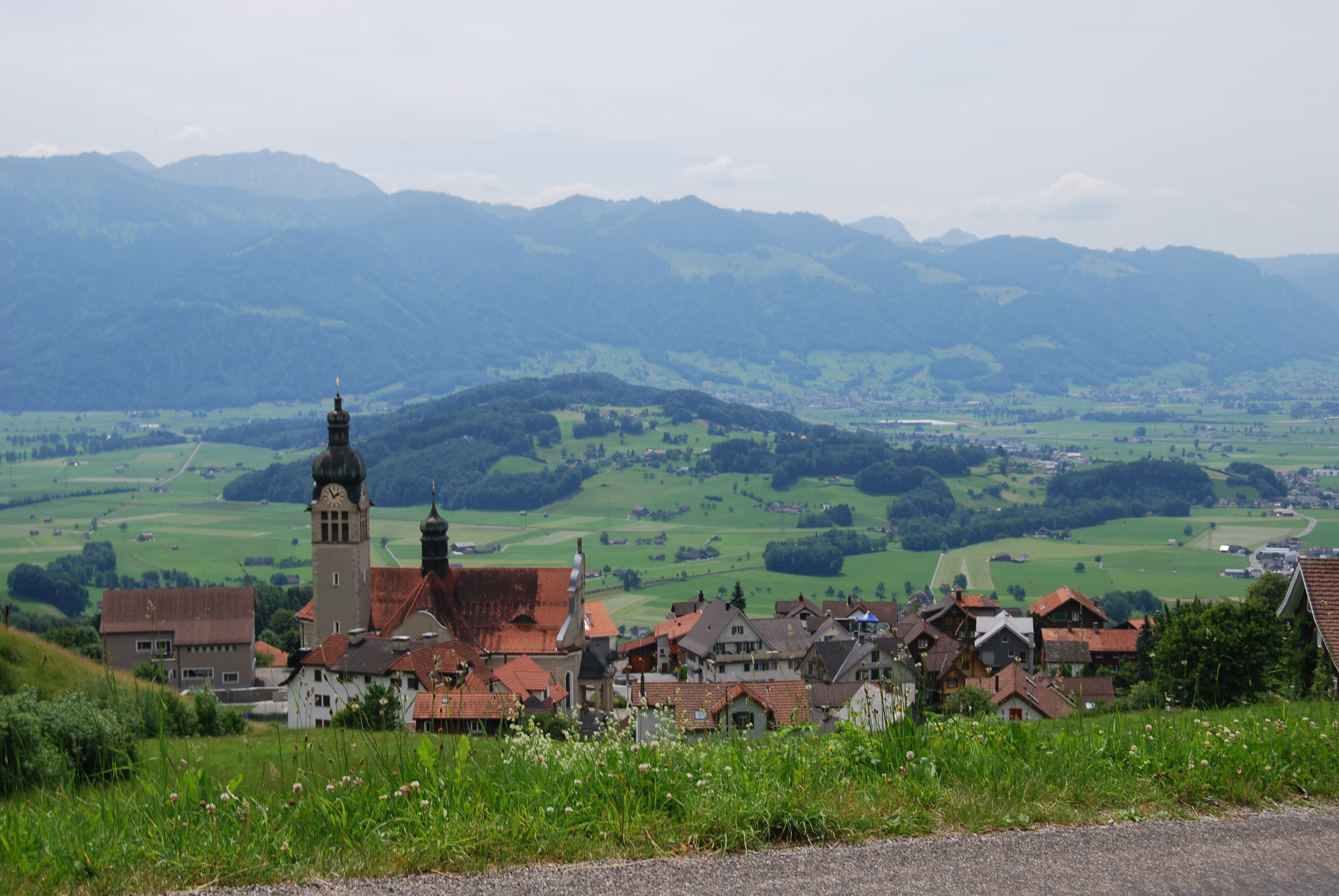

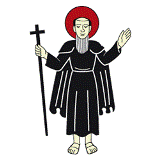
- Coat of arms
- Location of Rieden
- Location within Switzerland Location within Canton of St. Gallen
- Coordinates: 47°13′N 9°3′E
- Country: Switzerland
- Canton: St. Gallen
- District: See-Gaster

Government
  - Mayor: Martin Bosshard

Area
  - Total: 11.42 km^{2} (4.41 sq mi)
- Elevation: 715 m (2,346 ft)

Population (Dec 2011)
  - Total: 685
  - Density: 60.0/km^{2} (155/sq mi)
- Time zone: UTC+01:00 (CET)
  - Summer (DST): UTC+02:00 (CEST)
- Postal code: 8739
- SFOS number: 3314
- ISO 3166 code: CH-SG
- Surrounded by: Ebnat-Kappel, Gommiswald, Kaltbrunn
- Website: rieden.ch

Rieden (Swiss Standard German pronunciation: [ˈriːdn̩]) is a former municipality in the Wahlkreis (constituency) of See-Gaster in the canton of St. Gallen in Switzerland. On 1 January 2013 the former municipalities of Rieden and Ernetschwil merged into the municipality of Gommiswald.

== History ==
Rieden is first mentioned in 1045 as Rieta.

== Geography ==
Rieden had an area, as of 2006, of 11.5 km^{2} (4.4 sq mi). Of this area, 39.8% is used for agricultural purposes, while 56.4% is forested. Of the rest of the land, 3% is settled (buildings or roads) and the remainder (0.7%) is non-productive (rivers or lakes).

The former municipality is located in the See-Gaster Wahlkreis on a terrace above and east of the Linth valley. It consists of the Haufendorf village (an irregular, unplanned and quite closely packed village, built around a central square) of Rieden and scattered, individual farm houses.

Aerial view (1948)

== Coat of arms ==
The blazon of the municipal coat of arms is Argent, St. Magnus statant clad as monk and cloaked Sable haloed Gules holding in dexter a Staff topped with a Cross Sable.

== Demographics ==
Rieden had a population (as of 2011) of 685. As of 2007, about 5.8% of the population was made up of foreign nationals. Of the foreign population, (as of 2000), 15 are from Germany, 2 are from Italy, 5 are from ex-Yugoslavia, 2 are from Austria, and 5 are from another country. Over the last 10 years the population has grown at a rate of 4.7%. Most of the population (as of 2000) speaks German (98.2%), with Romanian being second most common ( 0.4%) and French being third ( 0.3%). Of the Swiss national languages (as of 2000), 694 speak German, 2 people speak French, 2 people speak Italian,

The age distribution, as of 2000, in Rieden is; 108 children or 15.3% of the population are between 0 and 9 years old and 90 teenagers or 12.7% are between 10 and 19. Of the adult population, 64 people or 9.1% of the population are between 20 and 29 years old. 119 people or 16.8% are between 30 and 39, 87 people or 12.3% are between 40 and 49, and 75 people or 10.6% are between 50 and 59. The senior population distribution is 88 people or 12.4% of the population are between 60 and 69 years old, 50 people or 7.1% are between 70 and 79, there are 25 people or 3.5% who are between 80 and 89, and there is 1 person who is between 90 and 99.

In 2000 there were 45 persons (or 6.4% of the population) who were living alone in a private dwelling. There were 168 (or 23.8%) persons who were part of a couple (married or otherwise committed) without children, and 430 (or 60.8%) who were part of a couple with children. There were 16 (or 2.3%) people who lived in single parent home, while there are 2 persons who were adult children living with one or both parents, 2 who lived household made up of unrelated persons, and 44 who are either institutionalized or live in another type of collective housing.

In the 2007 federal election the most popular party was the SVP which received 43.4% of the vote. The next three most popular parties were the CVP (27.1%), the SP (10.2%) and the Green Party (8.2%).

In Rieden about 72% of the population (between age 25–64) have completed either non-mandatory upper secondary education or additional higher education (either university or a Fachhochschule). Out of the total population in Rieden, as of 2000, the highest education level completed by 154 people (21.8% of the population) was Primary, while 248 (35.1%) have completed their secondary education, 89 (12.6%) have attended a Tertiary school, and 27 (3.8%) are not in school. The remainder did not answer this question.

The historical population is given in the following table:

year	population
1802	350
1831	551
1850	428
1900	414
1960	361
1990	561

== Economy ==
As of 2007, Rieden had an unemployment rate of 1.31%. As of 2005, there were 44 people employed in the primary economic sector and about 16 businesses involved in this sector. 13 people are employed in the secondary sector and there are 6 businesses in this sector. 63 people are employed in the tertiary sector, with 17 businesses in this sector.

As of October 2009 the average unemployment rate was 2.0%. There were 41 businesses in the municipality of which 7 were involved in the secondary sector of the economy while 20 were involved in the third.

As of 2000 there were 100 residents who worked in the municipality, while 245 residents worked outside Rieden and 30 people commuted into the municipality for work.

== Religion ==
From the 2000 census, 462 or 65.3% are Roman Catholic, while 134 or 19.0% belonged to the Swiss Reformed Church. Of the rest of the population, there are 5 individuals (or about 0.71% of the population) who belong to the Christian Catholic faith, there are 6 individuals (or about 0.85% of the population) who belong to the Orthodox Church, and there are 6 individuals (or about 0.85% of the population) who belong to another Christian church. There are 2 (or about 0.28% of the population) who are Islamic. There are 5 individuals (or about 0.71% of the population) who belong to another church (not listed on the census), 57 (or about 8.06% of the population) belong to no church, are agnostic or atheist, and 30 individuals (or about 4.24% of the population) did not answer the question.
