= Goldingen =

- Former municipality
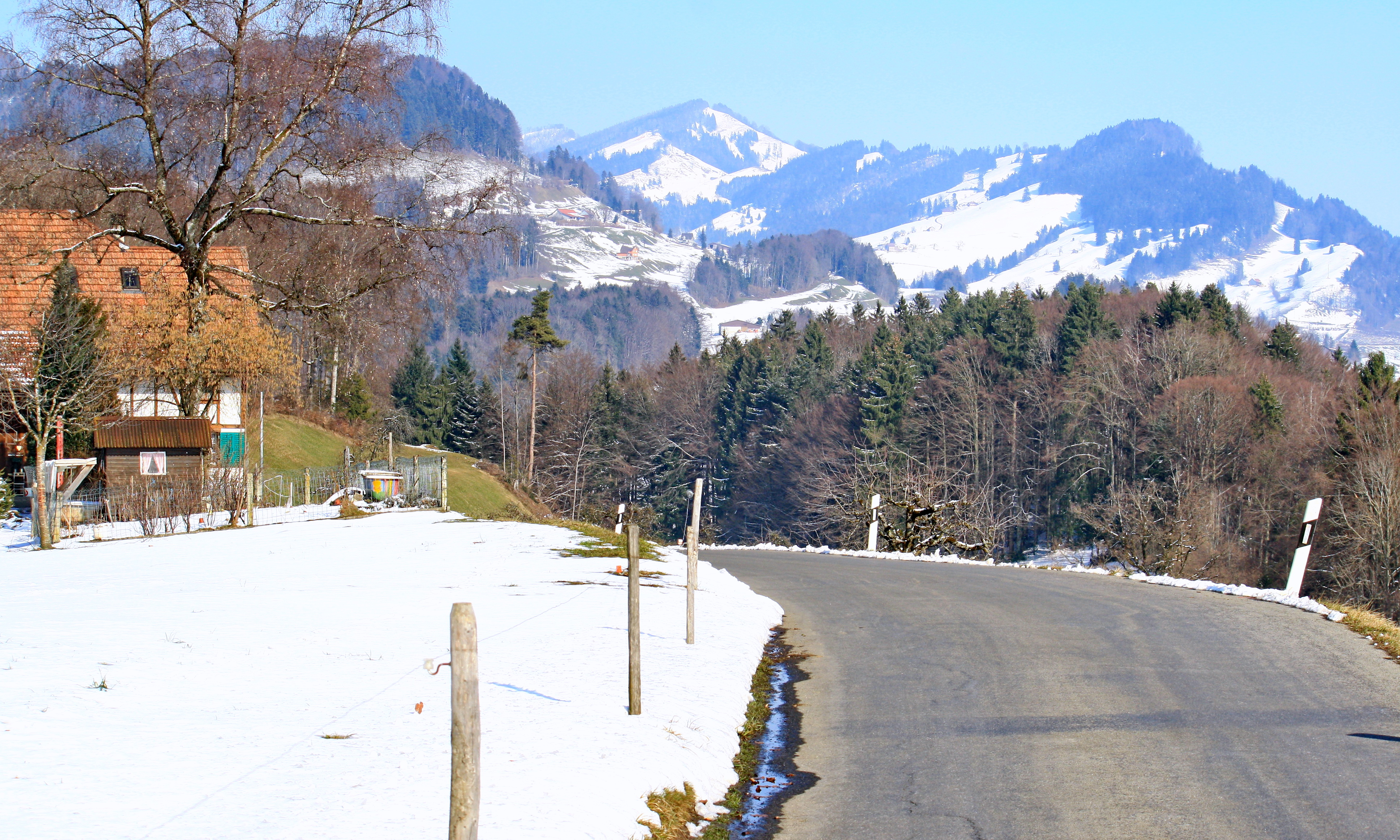

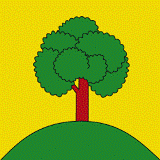
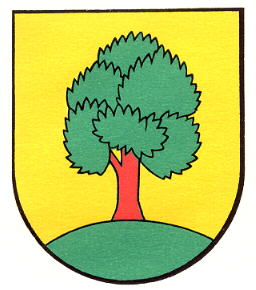
- Flag Coat of arms
- Location of Goldingen
- Location within Switzerland Location within Canton of St. Gallen
- Coordinates: 47°16′N 8°58′E
- Country: Switzerland
- Canton: St. Gallen
- District: Wahlkreis See-Gaster

Government
  - Mayor: Daniel Gübeli

Area
  - Total: 22.11 km^{2} (8.54 sq mi)
- Elevation: 705 m (2,313 ft)

Population (December 2011)
  - Total: 1,124
  - Density: 50.84/km^{2} (131.7/sq mi)
- Time zone: UTC+01:00 (CET)
  - Summer (DST): UTC+02:00 (CEST)
- Postal code: 8638
- SFOS number: 3333
- ISO 3166 code: CH-SG
- Surrounded by: Eschenbach, Fischenthal (ZH), Mosnang, Sankt Gallenkappel, Wald (ZH), Wattwil
- Website: www.goldingen.ch

Goldingen is a former municipality in the Wahlkreis (constituency) of See-Gaster in the canton of St. Gallen in Switzerland. On 1 January 2013 the former municipalities of Goldingen and St. Gallenkappel merged into the municipality of Eschenbach.

== History ==
The name Goldingen was applied to two different hamlets in the municipality. The current hamlet of Goldingen is first mentioned in 1800 and before that time was known as Thal. The hamlet of Vordersagen was first mentioned in 1266 as Goldelingin and until about 1700 was known as Goldingen. Additionally the hamlet of Hintersagen was known until about 1800 as Hintergoldingen.

== Geography ==
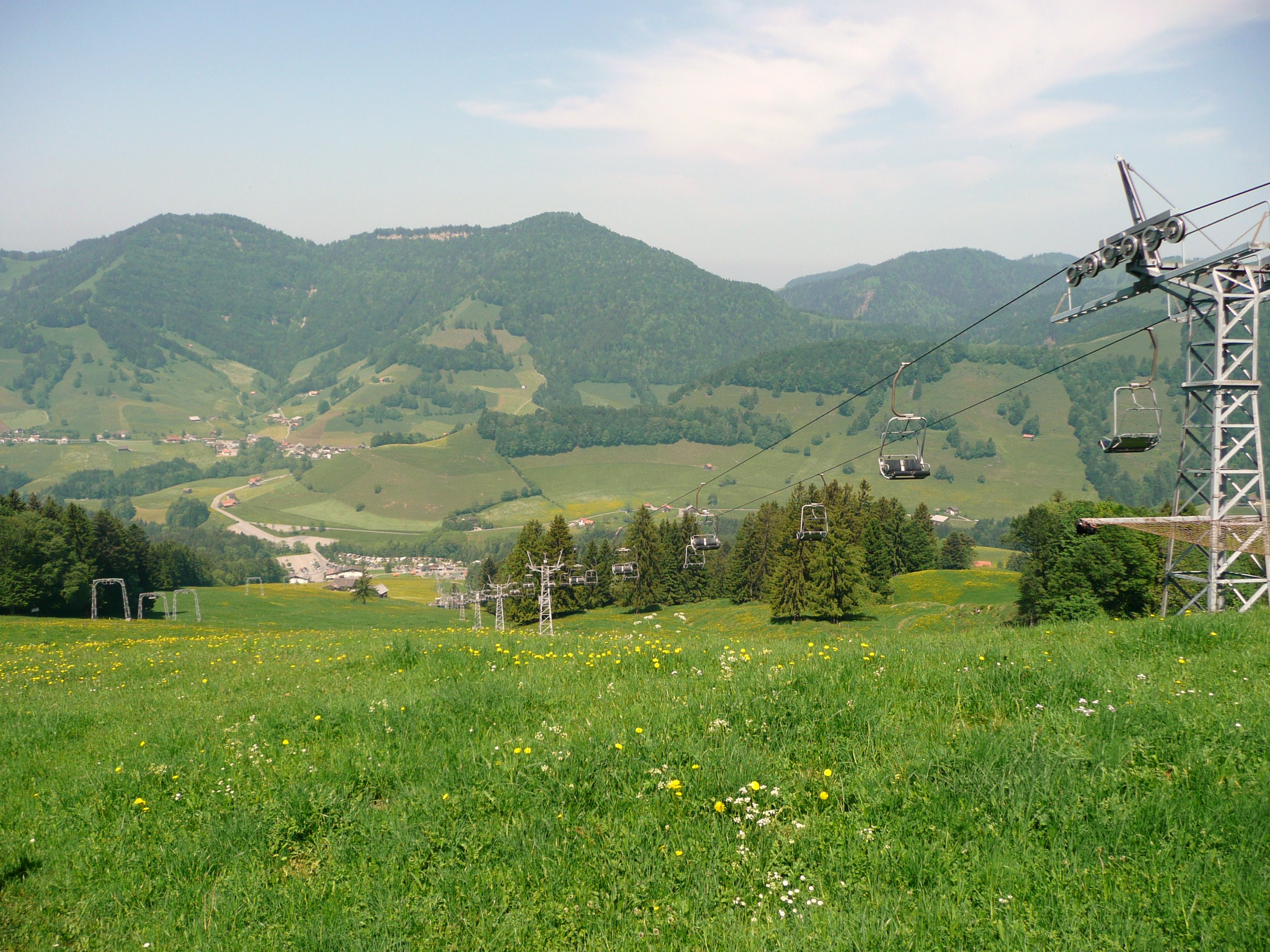
View from the sports center Atzmännig toward Goldingen

Aerial view (1965)

Goldingen had an area, as of 2006, of 22.1 km^{2} (8.5 sq mi). Of this area, 50.7% is used for agricultural purposes, while 45.1% is forested. Of the rest of the land, 3.7% is settled (buildings or roads) and the remainder (0.5%) is non-productive (rivers or lakes).

The former municipality is located in the See-Gaster Wahlkreis in the hill country. It consists of the hamlets of Goldingen, Echeltschwil, Hubertingen, Wolfertingen, Eglingen, Vordersagen, Hintersagen, Gibel and Oberholz.

== Coat of arms ==
The blazon of the municipal coat of arms is Or on a Mount Vert a Linden Tree of the same trunked proper.

== Demographics ==
Goldingen had a population (as of 2011) of 1,124, of which about 5.0% are foreign nationals. Of the foreign population, (as of 2000), 8 are from Germany, 2 are from Italy, 8 are from ex-Yugoslavia, 1 person is from Austria, and 10 are from another country. Over the last 10 years the population has grown at a rate of 1.2%. Most of the population (as of 2000) speaks German (97.9%), with Portuguese being second most common ( 0.7%) and English being third ( 0.6%). Of the Swiss national languages (as of 2000), 1,023 speak German, 1 person speaks, Italian, and 1 person speaks Romansh.

The age distribution, as of 2000, in Goldingen is; 152 children or 14.5% of the population are between 0 and 9 years old and 160 teenagers or 15.3% are between 10 and 19. Of the adult population, 116 people or 11.1% of the population are between 20 and 29 years old. 157 people or 15.0% are between 30 and 39, 152 people or 14.5% are between 40 and 49, and 122 people or 11.7% are between 50 and 59. The senior population distribution is 91 people or 8.7% of the population are between 60 and 69 years old, 59 people or 5.6% are between 70 and 79, there are 30 people or 2.9% who are between 80 and 89, and there are 6 people or 0.6% who are between 90 and 99.

In 2000 there were 103 persons (or 9.9% of the population) who were living alone in a private dwelling. There were 183 (or 17.5%) persons who were part of a couple (married or otherwise committed) without children, and 677 (or 64.8%) who were part of a couple with children. There were 40 (or 3.8%) people who lived in single parent home, while there are 11 persons who were adult children living with one or both parents, 4 persons who lived in a household made up of relatives, 15 who lived household made up of unrelated persons, and 12 who are either institutionalized or live in another type of collective housing.

In the 2007 federal election the most popular party was the SVP which received 45.8% of the vote. The next three most popular parties were the CVP (28.5%), the FDP (11.2%) and the SP (4.8%).

The entire Swiss population is generally well educated. In Goldingen about 62.9% of the population (between age 25-64) have completed either non-mandatory upper secondary education or additional higher education (either university or a Fachhochschule). Out of the total population in Goldingen, as of 2000, the highest education level completed by 277 people (26.5% of the population) was Primary, while 351 (33.6%) have completed a Secondary, 76 (7.3%) have attended a Tertiary school, and 46 (4.4%) are not in school. The remainder did not answer this question.

The historical population is given in the following table:

year	population
1673	ca. 500
1831	1,166
1850	1,053
1900	885
1950	1,072
1980	870
2000	1,045

== Heritage sites of national significance ==
The Fründsberg, a no longer visible castle ruin, is listed as a Swiss heritage site of national significance.

== Economy ==
As of 2007, Goldingen had an unemployment rate of 0.87%. As of 2005, there were 173 people employed in the primary economic sector and about 67 businesses involved in this sector. 136 people are employed in the secondary sector and there are 16 businesses in this sector. 87 people are employed in the tertiary sector, with 22 businesses in this sector.

As of October 2009 the average unemployment rate was 2.6%. There were 107 businesses in the municipality of which 16 were involved in the secondary sector of the economy while 29 were involved in the third.

As of 2000 there were 233 residents who worked in the municipality, while 335 residents worked outside Goldingen and 52 people commuted into the municipality for work.

== Religion ==
From the 2000 census, 774 or 74.1% are Roman Catholic, while 159 or 15.2% belonged to the Swiss Reformed Church. Of the rest of the population, there is 1 individual who belongs to the Christian Catholic faith, there are 2 individuals (or about 0.19% of the population) who belong to the Orthodox Church, and there are 5 individuals (or about 0.48% of the population) who belong to another Christian church. There are 5 (or about 0.48% of the population) who are Islamic. There are 4 individuals (or about 0.38% of the population) who belong to another church (not listed on the census), 65 (or about 6.22% of the population) belong to no church, are agnostic or atheist, and 30 individuals (or about 2.87% of the population) did not answer the question.
