= Mount Zion Abbey =

Coordinates: 47.24237°N 9.02299°E

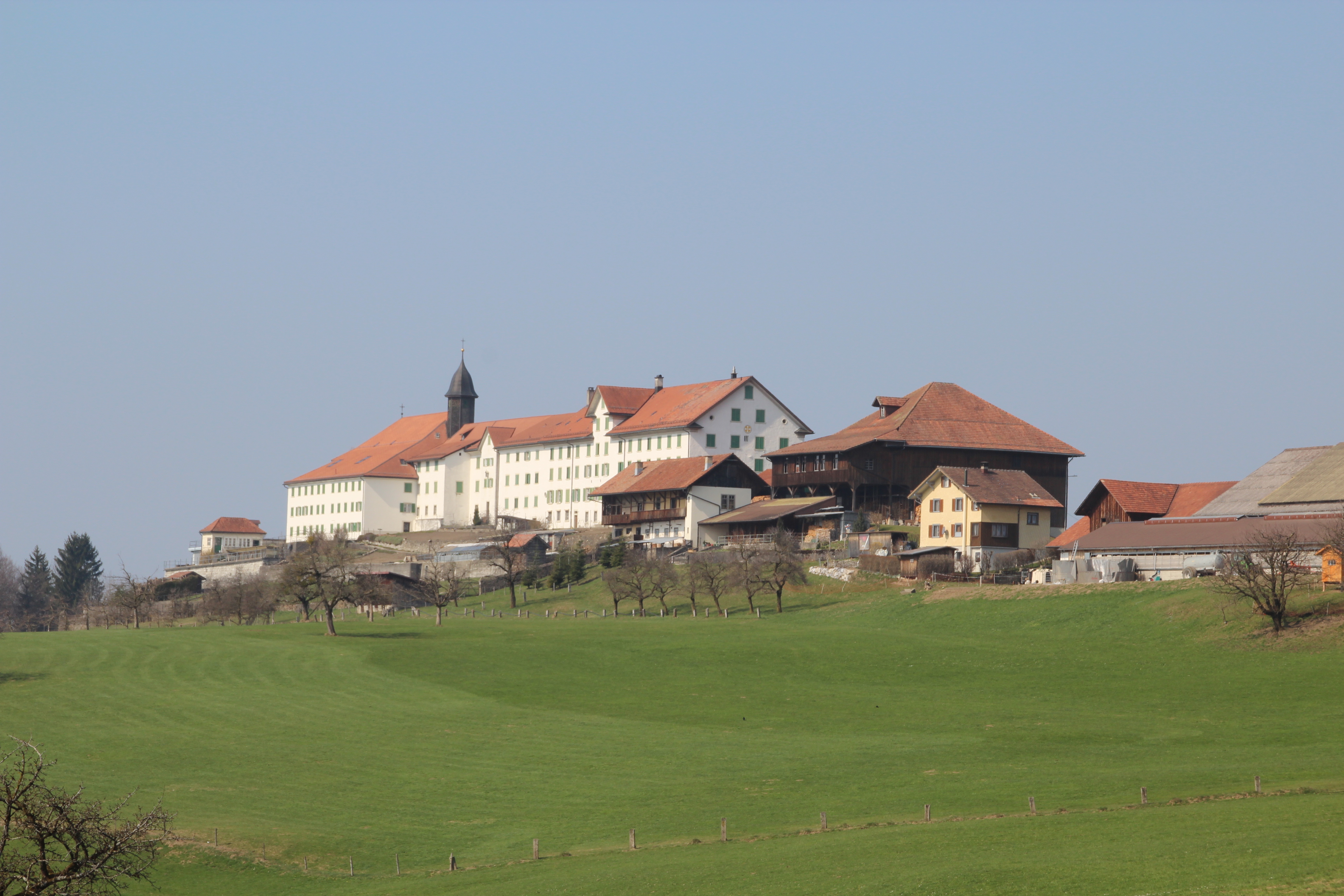
Mount Zion Abbey

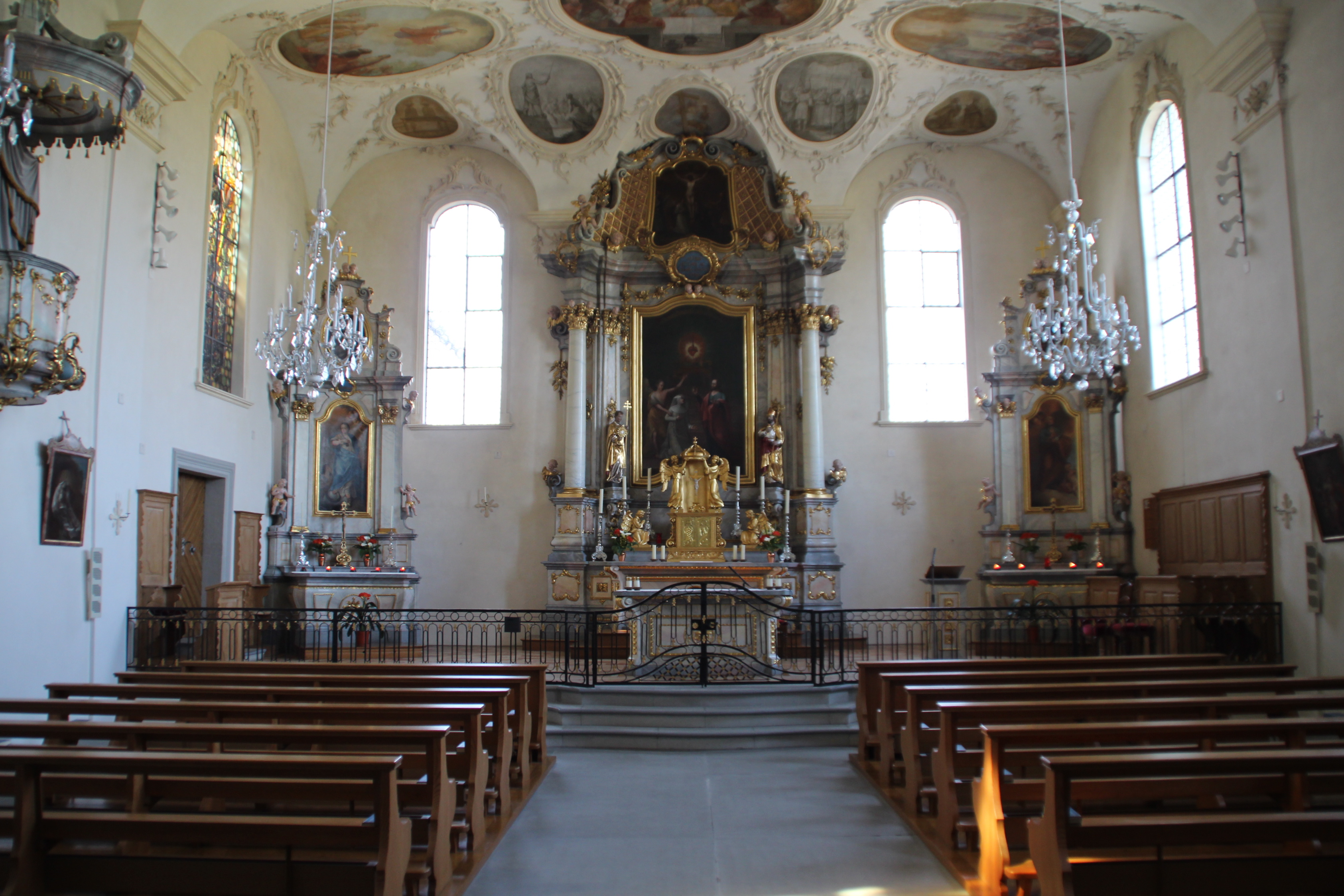
Interior of the Abbey Church

Mount Zion Abbey (German: Berg Sion) is a Premonstratensian nuns' abbey in the municipality of Gommiswald in the canton of St. Gallen in Switzerland. It is designated as part of the Inventory of Swiss Heritage Sites.

The Abbey was built on scenic rocky spur above the Gaster valley in 1761 by the priest Joseph Helg. It was built along a pilgrimage route from the churches on Lake Constance to Einsiedeln Abbey. The Loretto Chapel was built in 1763-65. A year after the chapel was completed three sisters moved from Schussenried Abbey in Germany to the new Abbey. The Abbey's farms and private donations supported the residents and allowed it to grow rapidly and by 1778 there were 52 sisters living there. The unique longitudinal main building grew organically through several expansion projects. Following the 1798 French invasion, the creation of the Helvetic Republic and then the Canton of St. Gallen in 1803, the Abbey went into decline. Under the Republic and the new Canton they lost many of their farms and were sometimes forced to billet troops. It rebounded between 1846-76 under the leadership of the matron Gertrude Hüsler from Steinhausen and confessor Benedict Frey from Wettingen Abbey. By 2000 there were 18 nuns living in the Abbey, under the Bishop of St. Gallen.
