= Franciscan Sisters of Mary Immaculate =

The Franciscan Sisters of Mary Immaculate were founded by Blessed Mother Caritas Brader (1860, Switzerland - 1943, Colombia), in Tuquerres, Colombia in 1893. The Congregation was first made up of young women from Switzerland and then immediately joined by Colombian vocations that allowed the new Congregation to spread to several countries including the United States. The Motherhouse and Novitatiate was moved from Tuquerres to Pasto in 1927.

Mother Caritas Brader was beatified by John Paul II on March 23, 2003. She focused the organization mainly on the education of the poor and the marginalized. Today, the religious sisters work in the mission fields of Central and South America, Mexico, Switzerland, Mali, Benin and in the southwestern United States. As of 2022, there were eighteen sisters in the Region de San Francisco, which takes in the United States and Mexico.
