= St. Gallenkappel =

- Former municipality
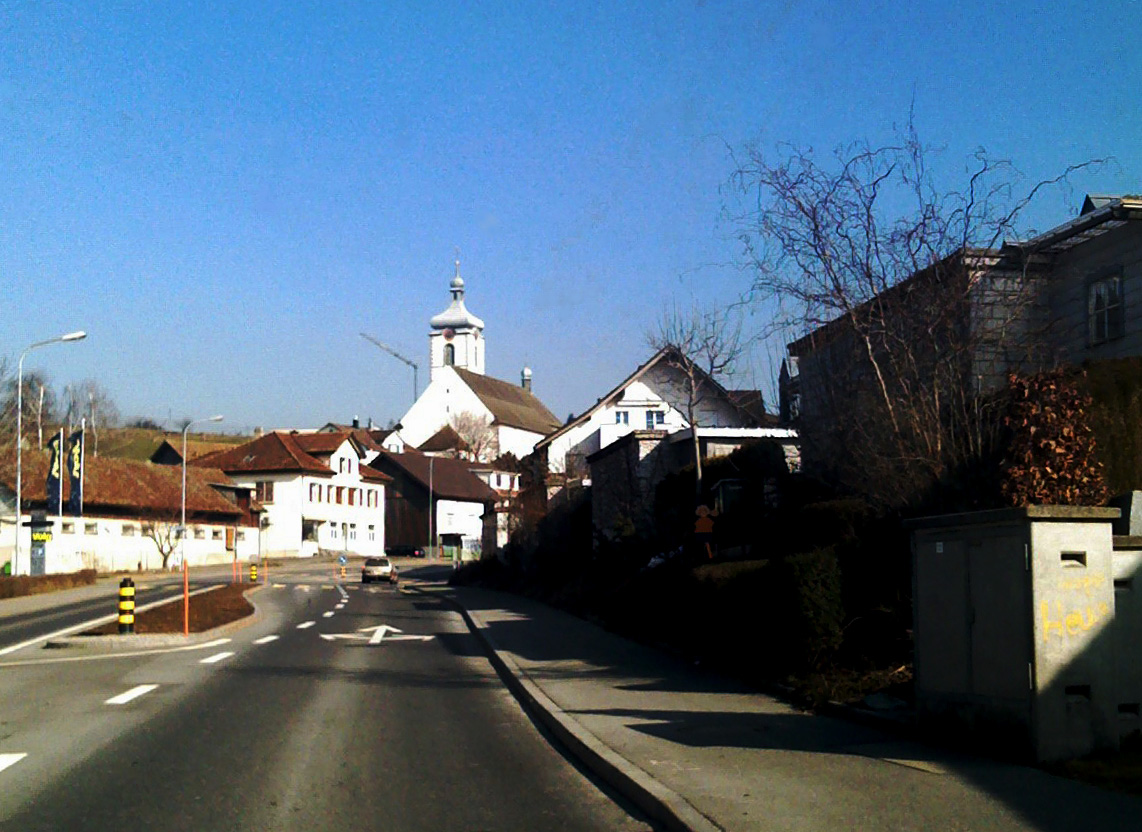
- St. Gallenkappel village

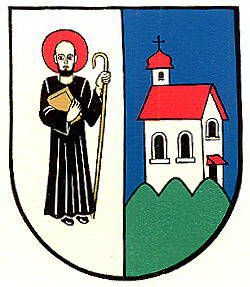
- Coat of arms
- Location of St. Gallenkappel
- Location within Switzerland Location within Canton of St. Gallen
- Coordinates: 47°15′N 8°59′E
- Country: Switzerland
- Canton: St. Gallen
- District: See-Gaster

Government
  - Mayor: Heribert Hubatka

Area
  - Total: 19.46 km^{2} (7.51 sq mi)
- Elevation: 595 m (1,952 ft)

Population (Dec 2011)
  - Total: 1,835
  - Density: 94.30/km^{2} (244.2/sq mi)
- Time zone: UTC+01:00 (CET)
  - Summer (DST): UTC+02:00 (CEST)
- Postal code: 8735
- SFOS number: 3337
- ISO 3166 code: CH-SG
- Surrounded by: Ernetschwil, Eschenbach, Goldingen, Mosnang, Uznach, Wattwil
- Website: www.stgallenkappel.ch

Aerial view from 500 m by Walter Mittelholzer (1927)

St. Gallenkappel is a former municipality in the Wahlkreis (constituency) of See-Gaster in the canton of St. Gallen in Switzerland. On 1 January 2013 the former municipalities of Goldingen and St. Gallenkappel merged into the municipality of Eschenbach.

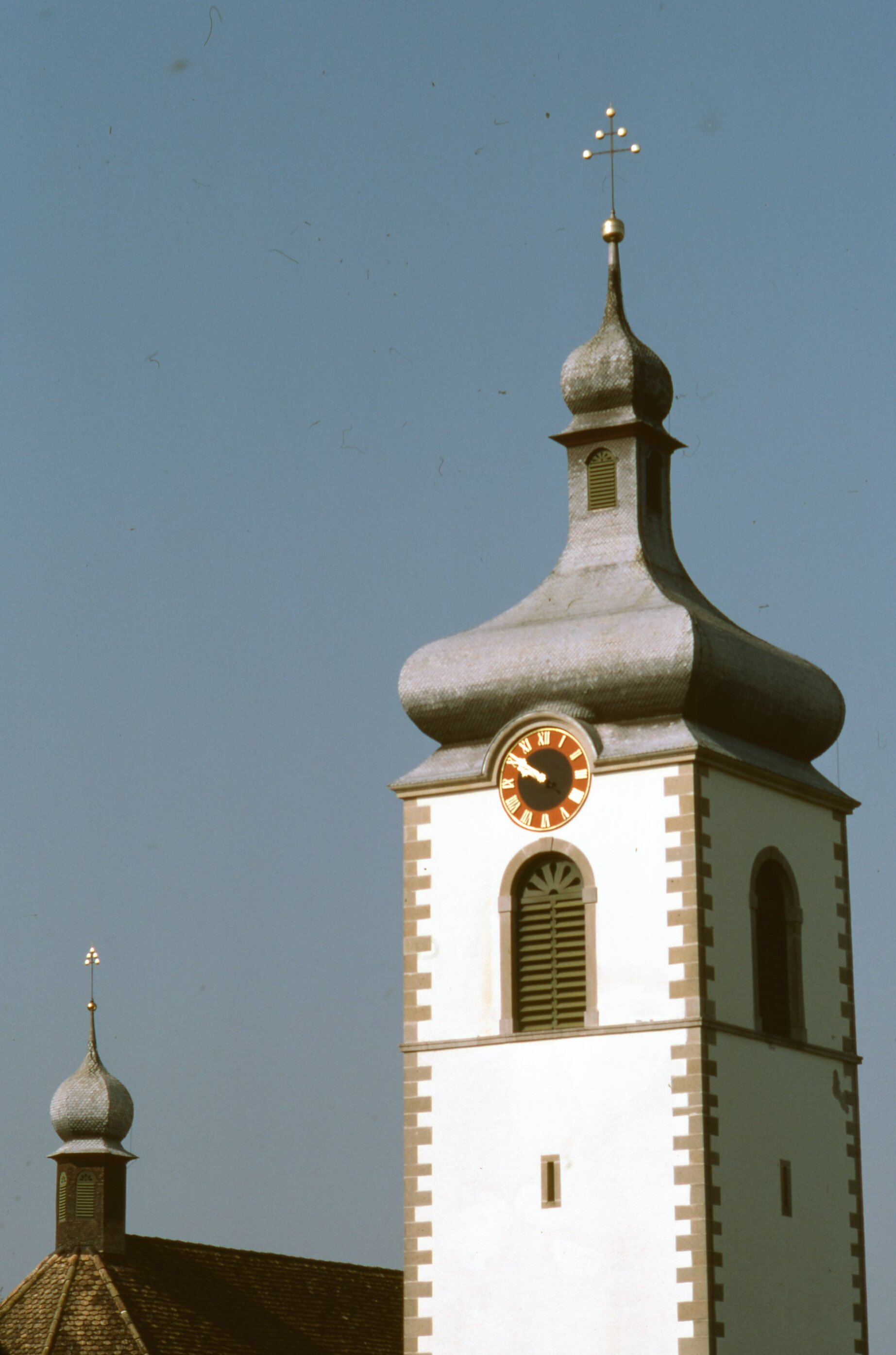

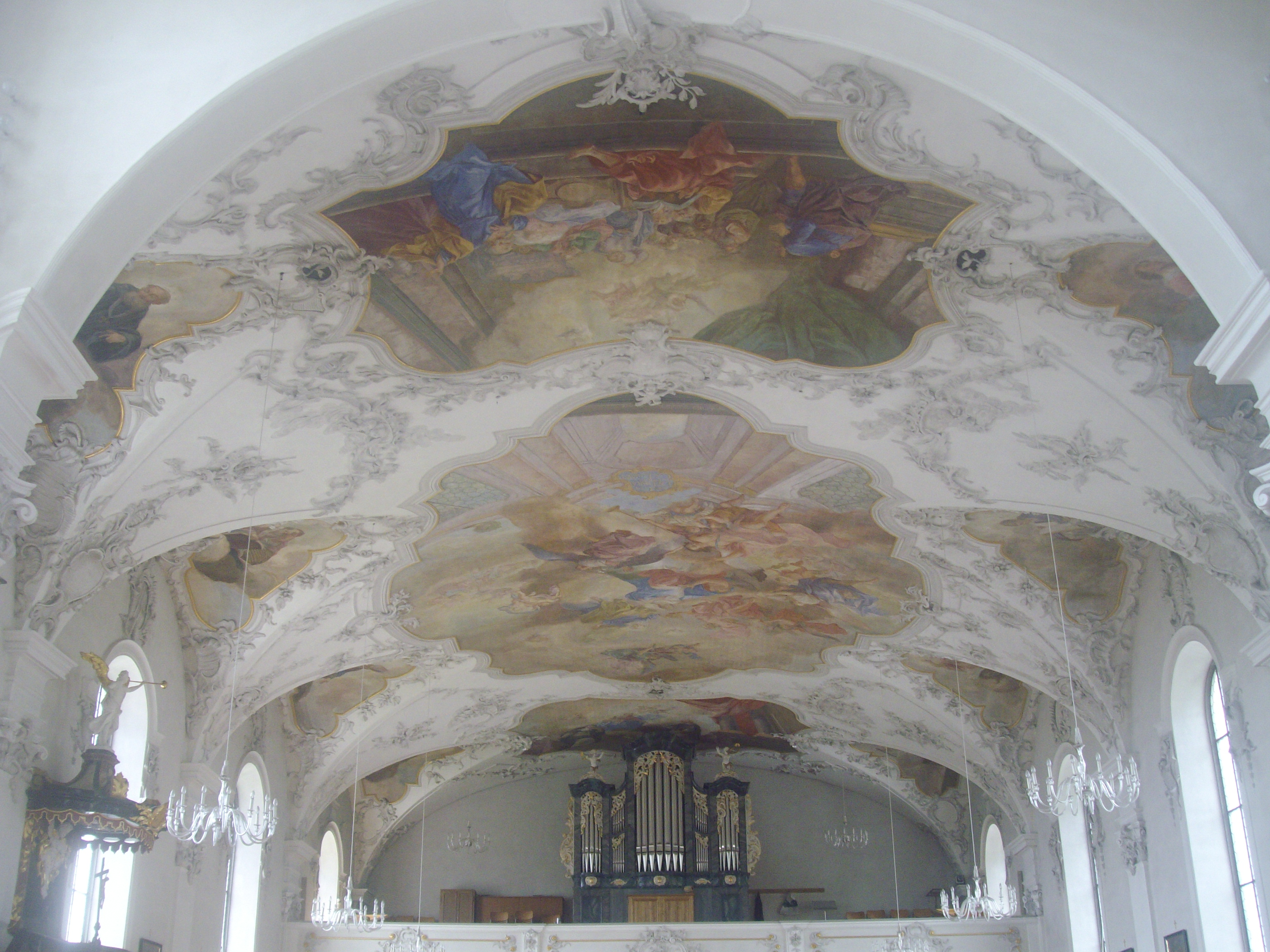

Baroque parish church "St. Laurentius and St. Gallus", architect Jakob Grubenmann, baroque painter Joseph Ignaz Weiss, built 1754-64.

== History ==
St. Gallenkappel is first mentioned in 1275 as S. Galli capella. In 1425 it was mentioned as bi Sant Gallencappel, and in the local Swiss German is still known as Chappele. It is located along two old trade and pilgrimage routes, one from Toggenburg over the Laad and the second from Hummelwald to Lake Zurich. In the 9th century there may have been a chapel dedicated to St. Gallus, where the current parish church now stands. This chapel was the origin of the village name.

On 10 December 1830, St. Gallenkappel was the site of a popular assembly, protesting the loss of freedoms under the Act of Mediation and the Restoration. The assembly at St. Gallenkappel was one of several in the Canton of St. Gallen and throughout Switzerland. They called for two main changes in the cantonal constitution. First, they called for peacefully adjusting the constitutions by adjusting the way seats in local legislatures and the Tagsatzung were allocated. In particular they objected to what they saw as the over-representation of the cantonal capital in the government. Secondly, they sought a way to amend the constitution. Very few cantons even had a way to amend or modify the constitutions, and none of them allowed citizen's initiatives to be added.

While all of these assemblies ended peacefully, they did march through the streets of St. Gallen. Following the protest march, the government quickly agreed to the protesters demands. Throughout the country, these successful assemblies led to the period known as the Regeneration and in 1848 the creation of the Swiss Federal State.

== Geography ==
St. Gallenkappel had an area, as of 2006, of 19.5 km^{2} (7.5 sq mi). Of this area, 59.5% is used for agricultural purposes, while 34.9% is forested. Of the rest of the land, 5.4% is settled (buildings or roads) and the remainder (0.2%) is non-productive (rivers or lakes).

The former municipality is located in the See-Gaster Wahlkreis to the southwest of the Ricken Pass between the Linth valley and the Tweralpspitz (elevation 1,332 m (4,370 ft)). It consists of the village of St. Gallenkappel and the hamlets of Bezikon, Rüeterswil and Walde.

== Coat of arms ==
The blazon of the municipal coat of arms is Per pale Argent St. Gallus statant clad Sable holding a book Or and a crooked staff and haloed Gules and Azure a Chapel Argent windowed Sable and roofed Gules issuant from triple mount Vert. It is an example of canting with St. Gallus German: St. Gallen and a chapel German: Kappelle spelling out the name of the municipality.

== Demographics ==
St. Gallenkappel had a population (as of 2011) of 1,835. As of 2007, about 5.6% of the population was made up of foreign nationals. Of the foreign population, (as of 2000), 15 are from Germany, 12 are from Italy, 66 are from ex-Yugoslavia, 6 are from Austria, 4 are from Turkey, and 22 are from another country. Over the last 10 years the population has grown at a rate of 3.8%. Most of the population (as of 2000) speaks German (94.6%), with Albanian being second most common (2.0%) and Serbo-Croatian being third (0.6%). Of the Swiss national languages (as of 2000), 1,626 speak German, 9 people speak French, 4 people speak Italian, and 4 people speak Romansh.

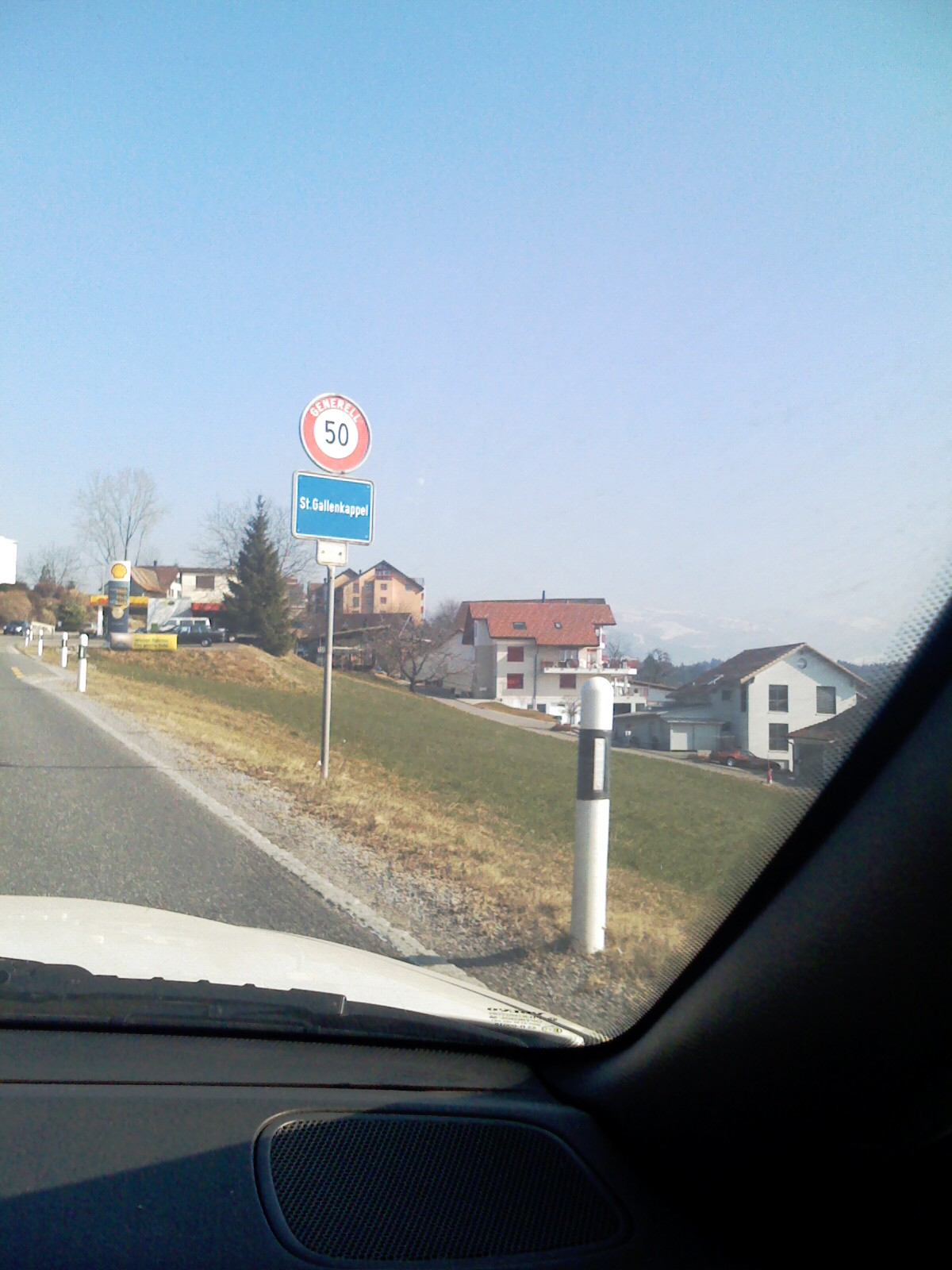
Entrance to the village

The age distribution, as of 2000, in St. Gallenkappel is; 255 children or 14.8% of the population are between 0 and 9 years old and 286 teenagers or 16.6% are between 10 and 19. Of the adult population, 193 people or 11.2% of the population are between 20 and 29 years old. 274 people or 15.9% are between 30 and 39, 245 people or 14.3% are between 40 and 49, and 188 people or 10.9% are between 50 and 59. The senior population distribution is 127 people or 7.4% of the population are between 60 and 69 years old, 78 people or 4.5% are between 70 and 79, there are 60 people or 3.5% who are between 80 and 89, and there are 13 people or 0.8% who are between 90 and 99.

In 2000 there were 143 persons (or 8.3% of the population) who were living alone in a private dwelling. There were 327 (or 19.0%) persons who were part of a couple (married or otherwise committed) without children, and 1,102 (or 64.1%) who were part of a couple with children. There were 57 (or 3.3%) people who lived in single parent home, while there are 18 persons who were adult children living with one or both parents, 16 persons who lived in a household made up of relatives, 8 who lived household made up of unrelated persons, and 48 who are either institutionalized or live in another type of collective housing.

In the 2007 federal election the most popular party was the SVP which received 46.9% of the vote. The next three most popular parties were the CVP (24.9%), the FDP (8.9%) and the Green Party (6.5%).

In St. Gallenkappel about 66.9% of the population (between age 25 and 64) have completed either non-mandatory upper secondary education or additional higher education (either university or a Fachhochschule). Out of the total population in St. Gallenkappel, as of 2000, the highest education level completed by 406 people (23.6% of the population) was Primary, while 558 (32.5%) have completed their secondary education, 140 (8.1%) have attended a Tertiary school, and 81 (4.7%) are not in school. The remainder did not answer this question.

The historical population is given in the following table:

year	population
1850	1,229
1900	1,008
1950	1,110
2000	1,719

== Economy ==
As of 2007, St. Gallenkappel had an unemployment rate of 1.02%. As of 2005, there were 178 people employed in the primary economic sector and about 71 businesses involved in this sector. 124 people are employed in the secondary sector and there are 22 businesses in this sector. 215 people are employed in the tertiary sector, with 51 businesses in this sector.

As of October 2009 the average unemployment rate was 2.4%. There were 129 businesses in the municipality of which 19 were involved in the secondary sector of the economy while 50 were involved in the third.

As of 2000 there were 320 residents who worked in the municipality, while 555 residents worked outside St. Gallenkappel and 122 people commuted into the municipality for work.

== Religion ==
From the 2000 census, 1,260 or 73.3% are Roman Catholic, while 261 or 15.2% belonged to the Swiss Reformed Church. Of the rest of the population, there are 19 individuals (or about 1.11% of the population) who belong to the Orthodox Church, and there are 17 individuals (or about 0.99% of the population) who belong to another Christian church. There are 11 (or about 0.64% of the population) who are Islamic. There are 16 individuals (or about 0.93% of the population) who belong to another church (not listed on the census), 102 (or about 5.93% of the population) belong to no church, are agnostic or atheist, and 33 individuals (or about 1.92% of the population) did not answer the question.
