= Flags and arms of municipalities of Switzerland =

This is a list of flags and coats of arms of the municipalities of Switzerland.

== Aargau ==
Name	COA	Flag	Colours	Blazon and Symbolism	Date
Aarau	Coat of arms of Aarau			Argent, an eagle sable armed and langued gules, a chief gules. The municipal flag and the coat of arms from 1270 showed an eagle and a three-leaved linden tree with flowers. An illustration of the coat of arms in the Tschachtlan chronicle from 1470 does not contain the linden tree, but a red shield head can be seen above the eagle for the first time. The eagle owes its use as the heraldic animal of the city of Aarau to a folk etymological reinterpretation of the name as “Au des Aars”.	1270
Aarburg	Coat of arms of Aarburg				
Abtwil	Coat of arms of Abtwil				
Ammerswil	Coat of arms of Ammerswil				
Aristau	Coat of arms of Aristau				
Baden	Coat of arms of Baden			Argent, a pale sable, a chief gules. The first documented use of the city seal is on a certificate of 25 February 1311. It showed, washed by spring water and surrounded by vines, a swimming pool in which a man and a woman sit and eat grapes. It was in use until 1497; in addition, there were six similar seals, which were used until about 1800. The hospital had its own seals (a hand in front of the Greek cross that extends two fingers). The first documentary mention of the Baden city banner dates back to 1361. The municipal regiment took it to the Battle of Sempach in 1386; the oldest pictorial representation can be found in the Tschachtlanchronik in 1470. Its meaning is unknown but it is believed to come from the Counts of Lenzburg or Austria. In 1441, the first representation of the banner in a coat of arms, cast in iron, was placed above the gate of the city tower, with the exaggerated imperial eagle, which was to clarify the theoretical status as a Free Imperial City. The meaning of the coat of arms and the flag has not been handed down. It may be due to the Counts of Lenzburg-Baden, or it is a derivative of the red-white-red Austrian coat of arms. The coat of arms and the flag are still considered the district coat of arms and flag.	1311
Lenzburg	Coat of arms of Lenzburg				1333
Unterentfelden	Coat of arms of Unterentfelden				
Zofingen	Coat of arms of Zofingen			Barry of four gules and argent. The colours of the stripes come from the flag of Austria.	1387

=== Former municipalities ===
Name	COA	Flag	Colours	Blazon and Symbolism	Date
Elfingen	Coat of arms of Elfingen			Gules, a double-armed cross argent on a trimount vert. Elfingen's symbol comes from the coat of arms of Hungary in honor of the relationship between the Königsfelden Monastery and Agnes of Austria. Adopted on 5 May 1953.	1245–2022

== Appenzell Ausserrhoden ==
Name	COA	Flag	Colours	Blazon and Symbolism	Date
Grub	Coat of arms of Grub			Argent, on a roundel sable a bear passant upon a grassland all Or. The coat of arms and the flag, which has been held in Grub since the early 19th century, shows the green forest in blue. A black bear emerges from a cave in front of it. In order to bring the coat of arms and the flag closer into connection with coat of arms and flag laws as well as with its deeper meaning, the black circular symbol for pit was used. Since this is black, the bear had to be made yellow. This makes it different from those in other municipal coats of arms and flags in the canton.	19th century

== Appenzell Innerrhoden ==
Appenzell District

== Basel-Landschaft ==
Name	COA	Flag	Colours	Blazon and Symbolism	Date
Anwil	Coat of arms of Anwil			Per pale sable and argent, a chief Or	
Dittingen	Coat of arms of Dittingen			Argent, a Saint passant robed Sable, haloed and carrying a bag and a staff, and wearing sandals Or, on a Base Vert between two trees of the same trunked Gules	
Rümlingen	Coat of arms of Rümlingen			On a gold background Saint George in blue armor with a red halo and red spear stabbing a black dragon. Saint George is the church patron and the colors gold and black represents the municipality's former affiliation to the Homburg rule.	1944
Ziefen	Coat of arms of Ziefen			Argent, an eagle displayed fesswise sable armed Or. It is the flag and the coat of arms of the Eptinger von Ziefen, as can be seen on a glass pane from 1583.	1943

Bennwil

Binningen

Birsfelden

Blauen

Ettingen

Gelterkinden

Münchenstein

== Basel-Stadt ==
Name	COA	Flag	Colours	Blazon and Symbolism	Date
Basel	Coat of arms of Basel			Argent, a crosier paleways sable	13th c.

== Bern ==
Name	COA	Flag	Colours	Blazon and Symbolism	Date
Aarwangen	Coat of arms of Aarwangen			Per pale sable and argent a bar of the first.	1341
Amsoldingen	Coat of arms of Amsoldingen			Azure a buckle or. The coat of arms and the flag belongs to the "von Amsolt" family.	1955
Bern	Coat of arms of Bern			Main article: Flag of Bern Gules, on a bend or a bear passant sable armed, langued, and pizzled of the field.	13th c.
Biel/Bienne	Coat of arms of Biel/Bienne			Gules two axes argent in saltire. The coat of arms and flag first appear on the city seal in the middle of the 13th century and show a man in a tunic with an ax in his right hand and a coat of arms with crossed axes in his left. The historian Heinrich Türler (1861–1933) assumed that this figure was the Meier von Biel and thus the former landlord: Biel was originally a manor (Fronhof) within a rule - probably the Count of Fenis-Neuenburg - which was administered by a Meier. As Lord of Biel he was raised to the knighthood. The coat of arms and flag with the crossed hatchets still represent the official coat of arms and flag today.	13th c.
Teuffenthal	Coat of arms of Teuffenthal			Or, a pall gules. It is the coat of arms and the flag of a Thun mayor, Konrad von Teuffenthal, in 1322. It was adopted by the community in 1945.	1945

Erlenbach im Simmental

Thun

== Fribourg ==
Name	COA	Flag	Colours	Blazon and Symbolism	Date
Echarlens	Coat of arms of Echarlens			Paly of six argent and gules overall in chief a mullet of five or	
Fribourg	Coat of arms of Fribourg			Azure a castle embattled and towered on dexter issuant from a semi annulet all argent	1225
Montagny	Coat of arms of Montagny			Paly of six or and gules and a chief argent	
Tafers	Coat of arms of Tafers			Gules, a guard stantant afrontee clad azure and sable ensigned with a cross on sinister, holding in dexter a halberd argent.	

=== Former municipalities ===
Name	COA	Flag	Colours	Blazon and Symbolism	Date
Alterswil	Coat of arms of Alterswil			Gules, a fleur de lis argent	
Autafond	Coat of arms of Autafond			Per pale argent and gules three roses counterchanged barbed and seeded proper	
Autavaux	Coat of arms of Autavaux			Gules, a chevron or between two mullets of five and a crescent of the same and on a chief argent a rose of the first barbed and seeded proper	
Bollion	Coat of arms of Bollion			Gules three mullets argent pierced in bend	
Bussy				Gules, a lion rampant or, overall a bendlet compony or and azure	
Corserey	Coat of arms of Corserey			Quartered gules and azure	
Font	Coat of arms of Font			Gules, a mullet argent pierced	
St. Antoni	Coat of arms of St. Antoni			Per fess or a tau cross issuant with two bells sabls and azure three annulets argent	

== Genève ==
Name	COA	Flag	Colours	Blazon and Symbolism	Date
Geneva	Coat of arms of Geneva			Per pale: first or, an eagle with two heads dimidiated per pale sable crowned, armed, and beaked gules; second gules, a key paleways or	15th c.
Pregny-Chambésy	Coat of arms of Pregny-Chambésy			Per saltire wavy azure and Or.	28 November 1924

Anières

Avully

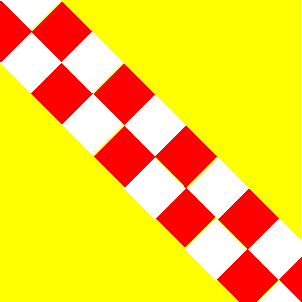
Avusy

Bardonnex

Bernex

Carouge (GE)

Cartigny

Céligny

Collonge-Bellerive

Confignon

Corsier (GE)

Genthod

Hermance

Le Grand-Saconnex

Onex

Russin

Thônex

Vandœuvres

Vernier

Versoix

Veyrier

== Glarus ==
Name	COA	Flag	Colours	Blazon and Symbolism	Date
Glarus	Coat of arms of Glarus			A bend wavy argent between: 1. In chief, per pale sable and Or, over all a six-pointed star countercharged; and 2. In base, gules with three six-pointed stars Or, arranged bendwise.; The bend represents the Linth river. The three yellow stars represents Ennenda, Netstal and Riedern, while the black and white star represents Glarus. Both the coat of arms and the flag combine the symbols of all the former municipalities.	2011
Glarus Nord	Coat of arms of Glarus Nord			Or, a pale wavy between eight mullets of six points, all azure. The four stars to the left of the wave represents Bilten, Niederurnen, Oberurnen and Näfels while the four stars on the right represents of Mühlehorn, Obstalden, Filzbach and Mollis. The blue wave represents the Linth river. Yellow and blue is the traditional colours of the municipality.	2011
Glarus Süd	Coat of arms of Glarus Süd			Azure a sun of seventeen rays Or above a chevron inverted wavy argent. The sunrays represents Mitlödi, Sool, Schwändi, Schwanden, Nidfurn, Haslen, Leuggelbach, Luchsingen, Hätzingen, Diesbach, Betschwanden, Rüti, Braunwald, Linthal, Engi, Matt and Elm. The white V-shaped wave symbolizes the confluence of the Linth and the Sernftal rivers. Blue stands for water which is a vital resource for the municipality.	2011

== Graubünden ==
Name	COA	Flag	Colours	Blazon and Symbolism	Date
Albula/Alvra	Coat of arms of Albula/Alvra			Gules, seven mullets of five points in annulo Or, a base barry wavy argent and azure. The seven former communities of Alvaneu, Alvaschein, Brienz/Brinzauls, Mon, Stierva, Surava and Tiefencastel have been united under the name Albula/Alvra since 2015. The seven stars refer to the number of congregations united. The wavy shield base is intended to symbolize the Albula River. Adopted on 1 January 2015.	2015
Andeer	Coat of arms of Andeer			Argent a bear rampant Sable langued and viriled Gules and a base embattled of the second. As a canting representation, the coat of arms refers to the Bärenburg castle and its historical significance for Andeer, with the bear alluding to the name and the crenellation to the castle (Bärenburg). Under the barons of Vaz and the Count v. Werdenberg-Sargans castle was the seat of the court and administration over the valley, at the time of the violent bailiff Hans v. Rechberg, it was stormed and destroyed.	
Arosa	Coat of arms of Arosa			Azure a Sun in splendour Or and a base dancetty Argent. The coat of arms, approved by the local council resolution of December 12, 1934 and by community vote on February 22, 1935, was designed by Paul Ganz, art historian at the University of Basel, and Friedrich Pieth, history teacher at the Chur Cantonal School. The two mountains symbolizes the altitude of the mountain community as well as mining between the 14th and 15th centuries. The colors blue and gold indicate the former membership of the Zehngerichtebund. The golden sun on a blue background also represents the community as a holiday resort. Adopted on 22 February 1935.	1935
Avers	Coat of arms of Avers			Per bend Argent an Ibex passant Sable langued and viriled Gules and Sable.	
Bergün Filisur	Coat of arms of Bergün Filisur			Argent a Griffin rampant Sable beaked and membered Gules. When the former municipalities of Bergün/Bravuogn and Filisur merged in 2018 under the name Bergün Filisur, the former Bergün district coat of arms was used. The Bergün district emerged from the old Greifenstein court, which the Greif indicates in the sense of a “talking” coat of arms. The colors are those of the church association to which the court belonged. The districts of the canton of Graubünden were dissolved on December 31, 2015.	2018
Bever	Coat of arms of Bever			Or St. James passant clad Azure holding in dexter a Crozier Gules and in sinister a Bible of the first. St. James the Elder was the patron of local church. It already appears on the community stamp and was also painted on the facade of the community center in 1927. Colors of the Upper Engadine district in reverse color sequence.	
Bonaduz	Coat of arms of Bonaduz			Argent a Pall Azure and a Mullet Gules in chief. The drawbar symbolizes the importance of the landscape, which is characterized by the two arms of the Rhine and the union of the Rhine. At the same time, it points to the fork in the paths to the Splügen and Bernhardin, the Lukmanier and Oberalp passes and thus characterizes the location of the village at this key traffic point. The star represents the patronage of St. Anna or Maria. The coat of arms was proposed by the municipality of Bonaduz.	
Bregaglia	Coat of arms of Bregaglia			Argent, an ibex salient sable langued gules, surmounting a base embattled of four merlons sable. Bregaglia was created on 1 January 2010 and includes the previously independent municipalities of Bondo, Castasegna, Soglio, Stampa and Vicosoprano. The municipality of Bregaglia and the former Bergell district therefore cover the same area. The community adopted the district's coat of arms. The black, crenellated shield base symbolizes the former division of the valley into upper and lower portals and alludes to one of the valley's most striking landmarks, the “Müraia”. The heraldic animal and colors are those of the church association, to which Bergell belonged.	2010
Breil/Brigels	Coat of arms of Breil/Brigels			Azure, three peaks argent, the middle one covering the two outer ones and charged with a tower gules masoned sable, in chief a sun of sixteen rays Or. In 2018, the three communities Andiast, Breil/Brigels and Waltensburg/Vuorz merged under the previous name Breil/Brigels. In the new coat of arms, each of the three communities is represented with a motif. The three white peaks stand for Brigels and symbolize the Brigelser Horns that are distinctive for the village: Cavistrau Pign (3220 m), Cavistrau Grand (3252 m) and Piz Trumpiv (3101 m). Waltensburg is represented by a red tower, which refers to the largest and oldest castle complex in the Surselva, Jörgenberg Castle (Munt Sogn Gieri). The name refers to Saint George's patronage of the church, around which the castle complex later developed. Andiast is represented by a sun. According to reports, the Andiasters found it difficult to define their own motif for their village. Of the three communities on the sun terrace above the Vorderrheintal, Andiast is the highest, and so its residents are a little more sun-drenched than the others.	2018
Brusio	Coat of arms of Brusio			Gules a Cross Argent. After a seal from the second decade of the 17th century with the inscription: SVB HOC SIGNO VINCES, but adopted without inscription. The colors are those of the old common judicial community of Puschlav.	
Buseno	Coat of arms of Buseno				
Calanca	Coat of arms of Calanca				
Cama	Coat of arms of Cama				
Castaneda	Coat of arms of Castaneda				
Cazis	Coat of arms of Cazis				
Celerina/Schlarigna	Coat of arms of Celerina/Schlarigna				
Chur	Coat of arms of Chur				
Churwalden	Coat of arms of Churwalden				
Conters im Prättigau	Coat of arms of Conters im Prättigau				
Davos	Coat of arms of Davos				
Disentis	Coat of arms of Disentis				
Domat/Ems	Coat of arms of Domat/Ems				
Domleschg	Coat of arms of Domleschg				
Falera	Coat of arms of Falera				
Felsberg	Coat of arms of Felsberg				
Ferrera	Coat of arms of Ferrera				
Fideris	Coat of arms of Fideris				
Fläsch	Coat of arms of Fläsch				
Flerden	Coat of arms of Flerden				
Flims	Coat of arms of Flims				
Furna	Coat of arms of Furna				
Fürstenau	Coat of arms of Fürstenau				
Grono	Coat of arms of Grono				
Grüsch	Coat of arms of Grüsch				
Ilanz/Glion	Coat of arms of Ilanz/Glion				
Jenaz	Coat of arms of Jenaz				
Jenins	Coat of arms of Jenins				
Klosters	Coat of arms of Klosters				
Küblis	Coat of arms of Küblis				
La Punt Chamues-ch	Coat of arms of La Punt Chamues-ch				
Laax	Coat of arms of Laax				
Landquart	Coat of arms of Landquart				
Lantsch/Lenz	Coat of arms of Lantsch/Lenz				
Lostallo	Coat of arms of Lostallo				
Lumnezia	Coat of arms of Lumnezia				
Luzein	Coat of arms of Luzein				
Madulain	Coat of arms of Madulain				
Maienfeld	Coat of arms of Maienfeld				
Malans	Coat of arms of Malans				
Masein	Coat of arms of Masein				
Medel (Lucmagn)	Coat of arms of Medel (Lucmagn)				
Mesocco	Coat of arms of Mesocco				
Muntogna da Schons	Coat of arms of Muntogna da Schons				
Obersaxen Mundaun	Coat of arms of Obersaxen Mundaun				
Pontresina	Coat of arms of Pontresina				
Poschiavo	Coat of arms of Poschiavo				
Rhäzüns	Coat of arms of Rhäzüns				
Rheinwald	Coat of arms of Rheinwald				
Rongellen	Coat of arms of Rongellen				
Rossa	Coat of arms of Rossa				
Rothenbrunnen	Coat of arms of Rothenbrunnen				
Roveredo	Coat of arms of Roveredo				
Santa Maria in Calanca	Coat of arms of Santa Maria in Calanca				
St. Moritz	Coat of arms of St. Moritz				
San Vittore	Coat of arms of San Vittore				
S-chanf	Coat of arms of S-chanf				
Safiental	Coat of arms of Safiental				
Sagogn	Coat of arms of Sagogn				
Samedan	Coat of arms of Samedan				
Samnaun	Coat of arms of Samnaun				
Scharans	Coat of arms of Scharans				
Schiers	Coat of arms of Schiers				
Schluein	Coat of arms of Schluein				
Schmitten	Coat of arms of Schmitten				
Scuol	Coat of arms of Scuol				
Seewis im Prättigau	Coat of arms of Seewis im Prättigau				
Sils im Domleschg	Coat of arms of Sils im Domleschg				
Sils im Engadin/Segl	Coat of arms of Sils im Engadin/Segl				
Silvaplana	Coat of arms of Silvaplana				
Soazza	Coat of arms of Soazza				
Sufers	Coat of arms of Sufers				
Sumvitg	Coat of arms of Sumvitg				
Surses	Coat of arms of Surses				
Tamins	Coat of arms of Tamins				
Thusis	Coat of arms of Thusis				
Trimmis	Coat of arms of Trimmis				
Trin	Coat of arms of Trin				
Trun	Coat of arms of Trun				
Tschappina	Coat of arms of Tschappina				
Tschiertschen-Praden	Coat of arms of Tschiertschen-Praden				
Tujetsch	Coat of arms of Tujetsch				
Untervaz	Coat of arms of Untervaz				
Urmein	Coat of arms of Urmein				
Val Müstair	Coat of arms of Val Müstair				
Vals	Coat of arms of Vals				
Valsot	Coat of arms of Valsot				
Vaz/Obervaz	Coat of arms of Vaz/Obervaz				
Zernez	Coat of arms of Zernez				
Zillis-Reischen	Coat of arms of Zillis-Reischen				
Zizers	Coat of arms of Zizers				
Zuoz	Coat of arms of Zuoz				

=== Former municipalities ===
Name	COA	Flag	Colours	Blazon and Symbolism	Date
Almens	Coat of arms of Almens				
Bondo	Coat of arms of Almens				
Castasegna	Coat of arms of Castasegna				
Feldis/Veulden	Coat of arms of Feldis/Veulden				
Paspels	Coat of arms of Paspels				
Pratval	Coat of arms of Pratval				
Soglio	Coat of arms of Soglio				
Stampa	Coat of arms of Stampa				
Vicosoprano	Coat of arms of Vicosoprano				

== Jura ==
Name	COA	Flag	Colours	Blazon and Symbolism	Date
Basse-Vendline					
Boécourt	Coat of arms of Boécourt			Azure, a base vert, over all a garb and in chief three five-pointed stars, all Or. The coat of arms and flag were taken from Bourquard de Boécourt, the eighth abbot of Bellelay from 1296-1316, with three additional stars in reference to the three villages of Boécourt, Montravon and Séprais.	1945
Damphreux-Lugnez	Coat of arms of Damphreux-Lugnez				
Grandfontaine	Coat of arms of Grandfontaine			Or, a cross between in each quarter five billets (2,1,2), all sable. The coat of arms, adopted before 1900, goes back to the nobles of Grandfontaine, a branch of the Rocourt-Abbévillers, extinct in the 14th century.	Before 1900
Haute-Ajoie					
Haute-Sorne					
Le Bémont	Coat of arms of Le Bémont				
Movelier	Coat of arms of Movelier				
Pleigne	Coat of arms of Pleigne			Gules, between three mullets of five or a sword and a staff argent in saltire and in chief on an inescutcheon of the last a jay stantant lined sable. The coats of arms and the flag are explained as follows: the sword and the hand of justice remind us that on the territory of the municipality is the Richterstuhl or Selle au Roi, a place where justice went; the stars, the dependence of the convent of Lucelle. The gai, which is the nickname of the village, was added at the request of the municipal authorities.	30 May 1945
Saignelégier	Coat of arms of Saignelégier			Or, a mirror argent bordered sable, above a mount of six coupeaux gules. These are the old coat of arms and flag of the nobles of Spiegelberg, the remains of the castle of which are still visible at Rocher des Sommêtres, 2.5 km from Saignelégier.	

=== Former municipalities ===
Bonfol

Courtemaîche

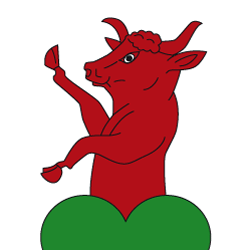
Le Peuchapatte

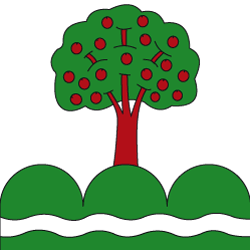
Les Pommerats

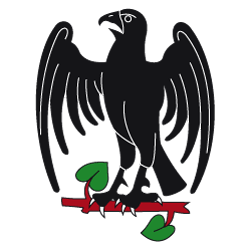
Montfavergier

Rocourt

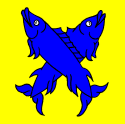
Vicques

== Lucerne ==
Name	COA	Flag	Colours	Blazon and Symbolism	Date
Hergiswil bei Willisau	Coat of arms of Hergiswil bei Willisau				18th c.
Lucerne	Coat of arms of Lucerne			Per pale azure and argent (flag: Per fess argent and azure)	14th c.

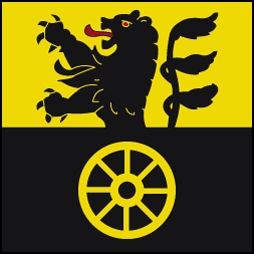
Adligenswil

Aesch

Alberswil

Altbüron

Altishofen

Ballwil

Beromünster

Buchrain

Bueron

Buttisholz

Dagmersellen

Dierikon

Doppleschwand

Ebikon

Egolzwil

Eich

Emmen

Ermensee

Eschenbach

Escholzmatt

Ettiswil

Fischbach

Flühli

Geuensee

Gisikon

Greppen

Grossdietwil

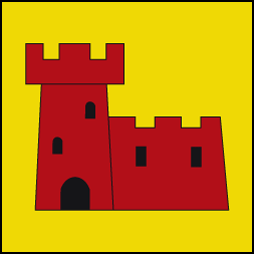
Grosswangen

Hasle

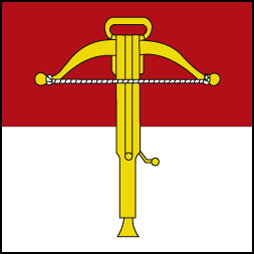
Hildisrieden

Hitzkirch

Hochdorf

Hohenrain

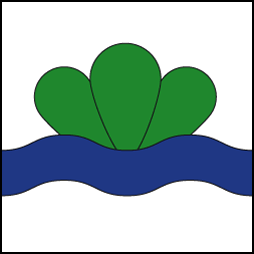
Honau

Horw

Inwil

Knutwil

Kriens

Luthern

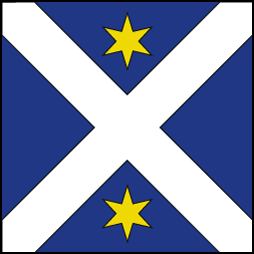
Malters

Marbach

Mauensee

Meggen

Meierskappel

Menznau

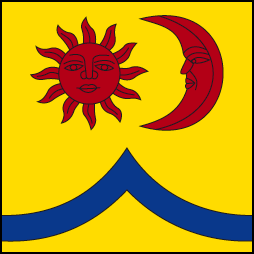
Nebikon

Neuenkirch

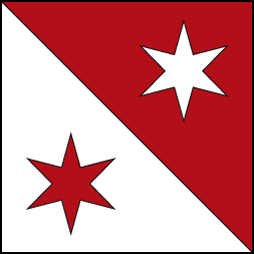
Nottwil

Oberkirch

Pfaffnau

Rain

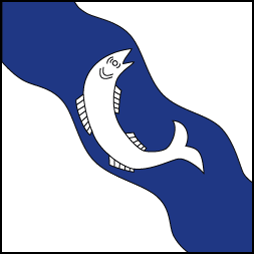
Rickenbach

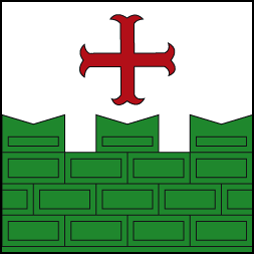
Roemerswil

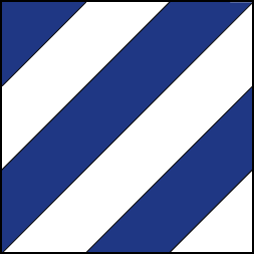
Roggliswil

Romoos

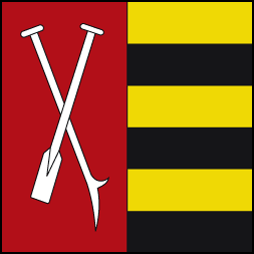
Root

Rothenburg

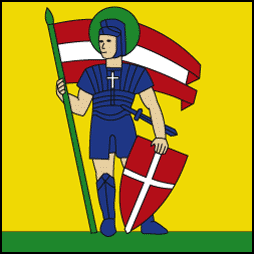
Ruswil

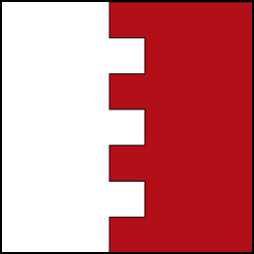
Schenkon

Schlierbach

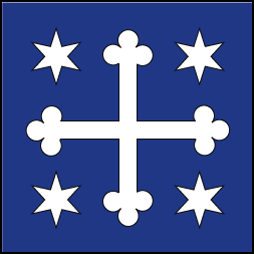
Schoetz

Schongau

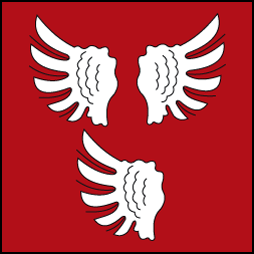
Schuepfheim

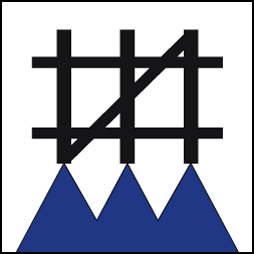
Schwarzenberg

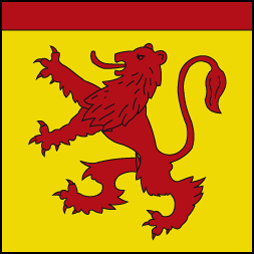
Sempach

Sursee

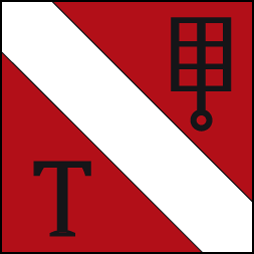
Triengen

Udligenswil

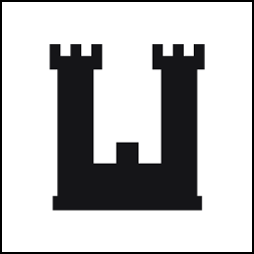
Ufhusen

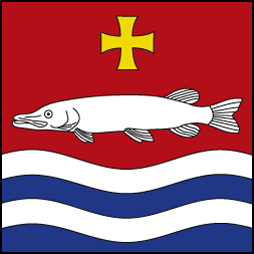
Vitznau

Wauwil

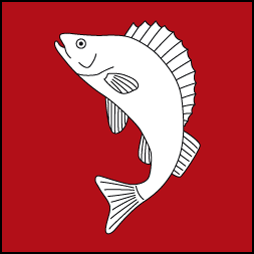
Weggis

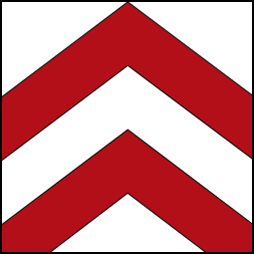
Werthenstein

Wikon

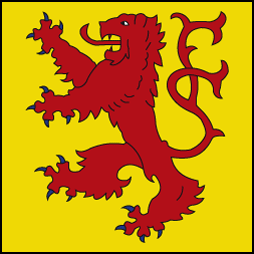
Willisau

Wolhusen

Zell

=== Former municipalities ===
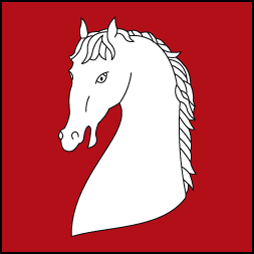
Altwis

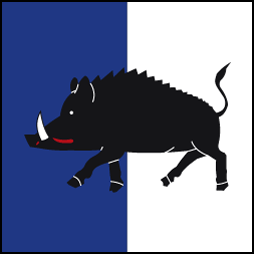
Ebersecken

Entlebuch

Gettnau

Littau

== Neuchâtel ==
Boudry

Laténa

Neuchâtel

La Chaux-de-Fonds

La Grande Béroche

Le Locle

Milvignes

Val-de-Ruz

Val-de-Travers

== Obwalden ==
Alpnach

Engelberg

Giswil

Kerns

Lungern

Sachseln

Sarnen

== Schaffhausen ==
Schaffhausen

== Schwyz ==
Name	COA	Flag	Colours	Blazon and Symbolism	Date
Galgenen	Coat of arms of Galgenen				

Alpthal

Altendorf

Arth

Einsiedeln

Feusisberg

Freienbach

Gersau

Illgau

Ingenbohl

Innerthal

Kuessnacht

Lachen

Lauerz

Morschach

Muotathal

Oberiberg

Reichenburg

Riemenstalden

Rothenthurm

Sattel

Schuebelbach

Schwyz (details)

Steinerberg

Tuggen

Unteriberg

Vorderthal

Wangen

Wollerau

=== Towns and villages ===
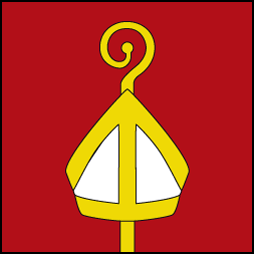
Bennau

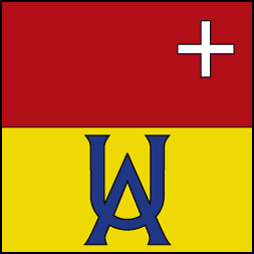
Goldau

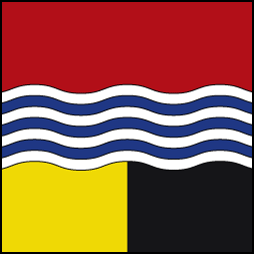
Ibach

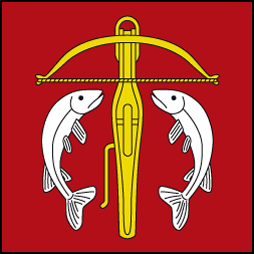
Immensee

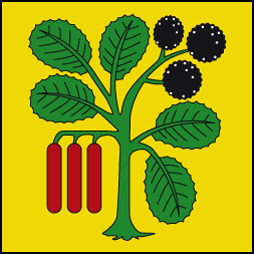
Merlischachen

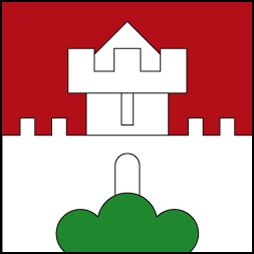
Oberarth

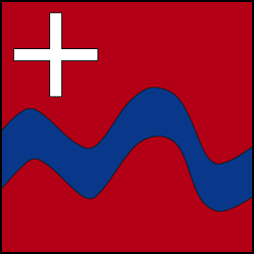
Rickenbach

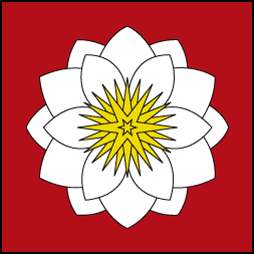
Seewen

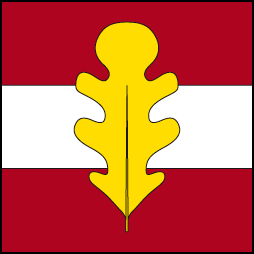
Siebnen

Steinen

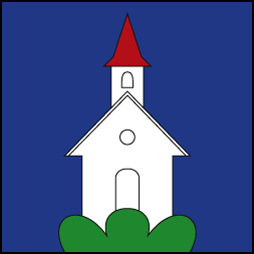
Willerzell

== Solothurn ==
Name	COA	Flag	Colours	Blazon and Symbolism	Date
Feldbrunnen-St. Niklaus	Coat of arms of Feldbrunnen-St. Niklaus			A castle and a fountain	
Solothurn	Coat of arms of Solothurn			Per fess gules and argent	1443

== St. Gallen ==
Name	COA	Flag	Colours	Blazon and Symbolism	Date
Mörschwil	Coat of arms of Mörschwil			Gules a Griffin passant Or.	
Waldkirch	Coat of arms of Waldkirch			Or a Church Argent roofed Gules windowed and with a clock Sable between two Pine Trees Vert on a Base of the same. The coat of arms and the flag are canting arms and canting flags respectively with the trees (German: Wald) and the church (German: Kirch) symbolizing the municipal name.	1443

Amden

Andwil

Au

Balgach

Eggersriet

Goldach

Oberriet

Oberuzwil

Rebstein

Rheineck

Rüthi

St. Gallen

Steinach

Thal

Untereggen

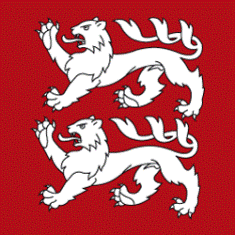
Zuzwil

=== Former municipalities ===
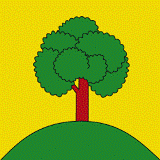
Goldingen

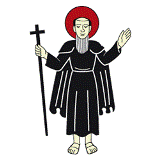
Rieden

=== Towns and villages ===
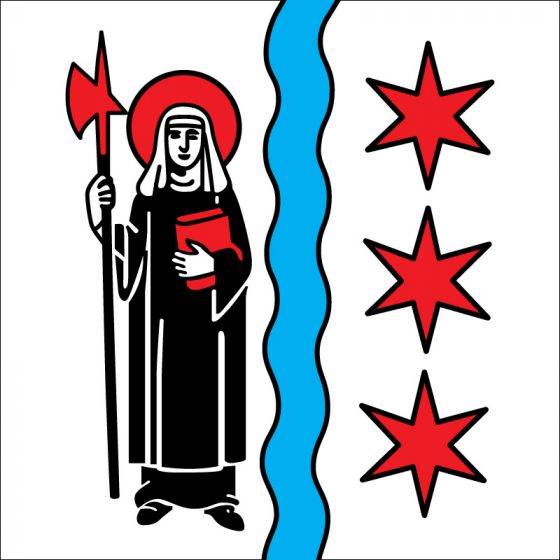
Bernhardzell

== Thurgau ==
Name	COA	Flag	Colours	Blazon and Symbolism	Date
Aadorf	Coat of arms of Aadorf				
Affeltrangen	Coat of arms of Affeltrangen				
Altnau	Coat of arms of Altnau				
Amlikon-Bissegg	Coat of arms of Amlikon-Bissegg				
Amriswil	Coat of arms of Amriswil				
Arbon	Coat of arms of Arbon				
Basadingen-Schlattingen	Coat of arms of Basadingen-Schlattingen				
Berg	Coat of arms of Berg				
Berlingen	Coat of arms of Berlingen				
Bischofszell	Coat of arms of Bischofszell				
Bottighofen	Coat of arms of Bottighofen				
Braunau	Coat of arms of Braunau				
Bussnang	Coat of arms of Bussnang				
Bürglen	Coat of arms of Bürglen				
Diessenhofen	Coat of arms of Diessenhofen				
Dozwil	Coat of arms of Dozwil				
Egnach	Coat of arms of Egnach				
Erlen	Coat of arms of Erlen				
Ermatingen	Coat of arms of Ermatingen				
Eschenz	Coat of arms of Eschenz				
Eschlikon	Coat of arms of Eschlikon				
Felben-Wellhausen	Coat of arms of Felben-Wellhausen				
Fischingen	Coat of arms of Fischingen				
Frauenfeld	Coat of arms of Frauenfeld				
Gachnang	Coat of arms of Gachnang				
Gottlieben	Coat of arms of Gottlieben				
Güttingen	Coat of arms of Güttingen				
Hauptwil-Gottshaus	Coat of arms of Hauptwil-Gottshaus				
Hefenhofen	Coat of arms of Hefenhofen				
Herdern	Coat of arms of Herdern				
Hohentannen	Coat of arms of Hohentannen				
Homburg	Coat of arms of Homburg				
Horn	Coat of arms of Horn				
Hüttlingen	Coat of arms of Hüttlingen				
Hüttwilen	Coat of arms of Hüttwilen				
Kemmental	Coat of arms of Kemmental				
Kesswil	Coat of arms of Kesswil				
Kradolf-Schönenberg	Coat of arms of Kradolf-Schönenberg				
Kreuzlingen	Coat of arms of Kreuzlingen				
Langrickenbach	Coat of arms of Langrickenbach				
Lengwil	Coat of arms of Lengwil				
Lommis	Coat of arms of Lommis				
Mammern	Coat of arms of Mammern				
Märstetten	Coat of arms of Märstetten				
Matzingen	Coat of arms of Matzingen				14th century
Müllheim	Coat of arms of Müllheim				
Münchwilen	Coat of arms of Münchwilen				
Münsterlingen	Coat of arms of Münsterlingen				
Neunforn	Coat of arms of Neunforn				
Pfyn	Coat of arms of Pfyn				
Raperswilen	Coat of arms of Raperswilen				
Rickenbach	Coat of arms of Rickenbach				
Roggwil	Coat of arms of Roggwil				
Romanshorn	Coat of arms of Romanshorn				
Salenstein	Coat of arms of Salenstein				
Salmsach	Coat of arms of Salmsach				
Schönholzerswilen	Coat of arms of Schönholzerswilen				
Schlatt	Coat of arms of Schlatt				
Sirnach	Coat of arms of Sirnach				
Sommeri	Coat of arms of Sommeri				
Steckborn	Coat of arms of Steckborn				
Stettfurt	Coat of arms of Stettfurt				
Sulgen	Coat of arms of Sulgen				
Tägerwilen	Coat of arms of Tägerwilen				17th century
Thundorf	Coat of arms of Thundorf				
Tobel-Tägerschen	Coat of arms of Tobel-Tägerschen				
Uesslingen-Buch	Coat of arms of Uesslingen-Buch				
Uttwil	Coat of arms of Uttwil				
Wäldi	Coat of arms of Wäldi				
Wagenhausen	Coat of arms of Wagenhausen				
Wängi	Coat of arms of Wängi				
Warth-Weiningen	Coat of arms of Warth-Weiningen				
Weinfelden	Coat of arms of Weinfelden				
Wigoltingen	Coat of arms of Wigoltingen				
Wilen	Coat of arms of Wilen				
Wuppenau	Coat of arms of Wuppenau				
Zihlschlacht-Sitterdorf	Coat of arms of Zihlschlacht-Sitterdorf				

=== Former municipalities ===
Name	COA	Flag	Colours	Blazon and Symbolism	Date
Eschikofen	Coat of arms of Eschikofen				

== Ticino ==
Name	COA	Flag	Colours	Blazon and Symbolism	Date
Lugano	Coat of arms of Lugano			Gules, a cross ̄between the letters L, V, G and A, all argent. The meaning of the letters is unknown. Interpretations suggest that they are either an abbreviation of the municipality, an acronym of "La Vera Giustizia Antica" or a symbol of a Roman legion. The cross on a red background alludes to both the symbols of Como in Italy and Switzerland.	1220
Mezzovico-Vira	Coat of arms of Mezzovico-Vira			Per pale, 1. Dexter, a green hemp plant with a yellow bloom on a white background.; 2. Sinister, azure, a white shield (containing a red cross) attached to a gold crozier.; The hemp plant represents the Canepas family (who are artists) and the crozier represents Bishop Enrico Silvio (1556–1612).	
Mendrisio	Coat of arms of Mendrisio			On a red background is a white cross. The cross on a red background alludes to both the symbols of Como in Italy and Switzerland.	

== Uri ==
Name	COA	Flag	Colours	Blazon and Symbolism	Date
Altdorf	Coat of arms of Altdorf			Or an eagle sable armed and langued gules, dimidiated with Gules two bendlets sinister argent. The coat of arms and the flag can be traced back to 1684. The left half of the shield with the three red tinctures is intended to commemorate the three village fires of 1400, 1693 and 1799, while the black eagle in yellow indicates the former imperial affiliation.	
Andermatt	Coat of arms of Andermatt			In yellow a rising, red-armored and -tongued black bear, accompanied by a black paw cross in the upper left corner. The coat of arms and the flag was used by the community in the seal around the middle of the 19th century at the latest, but was not precisely defined until 1968. The bear as a municipal animal originated from the valley name Talnamen Ursern (Bear Valley in Latin).	1968
Attinghausen	Coat of arms of Attinghausen			Per fess or and barry of four sable and or, in chief a demi-eagle issuant sable langued gules. The coat of arms and the flag corresponds to that of the baronial family of Schweinsberg-Attinghausen (which lived in the 13th and 14th centuries) occupied a powerful position in Uri and lived in the castle of Attinghausen. The precise formal determination was made by the local council in 1990.	1163
Bürglen	Coat of arms of Bürglen			In blue, on green ground, a white wall with four red-roofed towers and a red gate The coat of arms and the flag depicts the four residential and defensive towers from the 12th century, of which the defiant Meierturm is still preserved in its original form. The second tower houses the much-visited Tell Museum since its restoration in 1966. The still visible remains of the third and fourth towers form the foundations of the Tell restaurant and the rectory.	1901

Erstfeld

Flüelen

Göschenen

Gurtnellen

Hospental

Isenthal

Realp

Schattdorf

Seedorf

Seelisberg

Silenen

Sisikon

Spiringen

Unterschächen

Wassen

=== Former municipalities ===
Name	COA	Flag	Colours	Blazon and Symbolism	Date
Bauen	Coat of arms of Bauen			Sable a massacre or enflamed gules. The coat of arms and the flag was used for the Schützenhaus as early as 1843. The image refers to the church patroness St. Ida of Toggenburg, whose attribute is the deer with twelve light-bearing antler ends.	1900

== Valais ==
Name	COA	Flag	Colours	Blazon and Symbolism	Date
Sierre	Coat of arms of Sierre			Gules with a sun figured or. The sun (a star, Latin sider–) is a reference to the name of the commune (anciently Sidrium). This is reproduced on the arms and flag of Noble-Contrée.	1446

Arbaz

Ardon

Baltschieder

Bourg-Saint-Pierre

Bovernier

Chamoson

Fiesch

Hérémence

Lalden

Leuk

Liddes

Martigny

Martigny-Combe

Orsières

Raron

Saint-Maurice

Simplon

Stalden

Täsch

=== Former municipalities ===
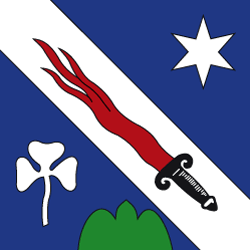
Erschmatt

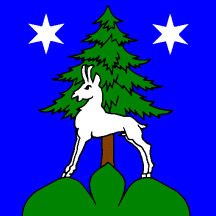
Mase

== Vaud ==
Assens

Aubonne

Bettens

Bogis-Bossey

Borex

Bournens

Boussens

Chavannes-des-Bois

Chessel

Chexbres

Commugny

Corseaux

Cossonay

Corcelles-près-Payerne

Corsier-sur-Vevey

Crans

Crassier

Daillens

Denges

Dizy

Dompierre

Duillier

Échandens

Éclépens

Grens

Gilly

Grancy

Grandevent

Jouxtens-Mézery

L'Isle (Vaud)

La Chaux (Cossonay)

Lausanne

Lully VD

Lutry

Mauborget

Mauraz

Mex (VD)

Moiry

Montricher

Morges

Nyon

Payerne

Prilly

Puidoux

Rolle

Sainte-Croix

Senarclens

Servion

Signy-Avenex

Sullens

Vevey

Vinzel

Vufflens-le-Château

Vulliens

Yens

Yverdon-les-Bains

=== Former municipalities ===
Blonay

Carrouge (VD)

Colombier (VD)

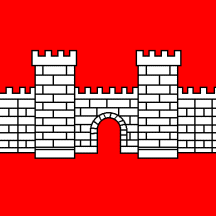
Donatyre

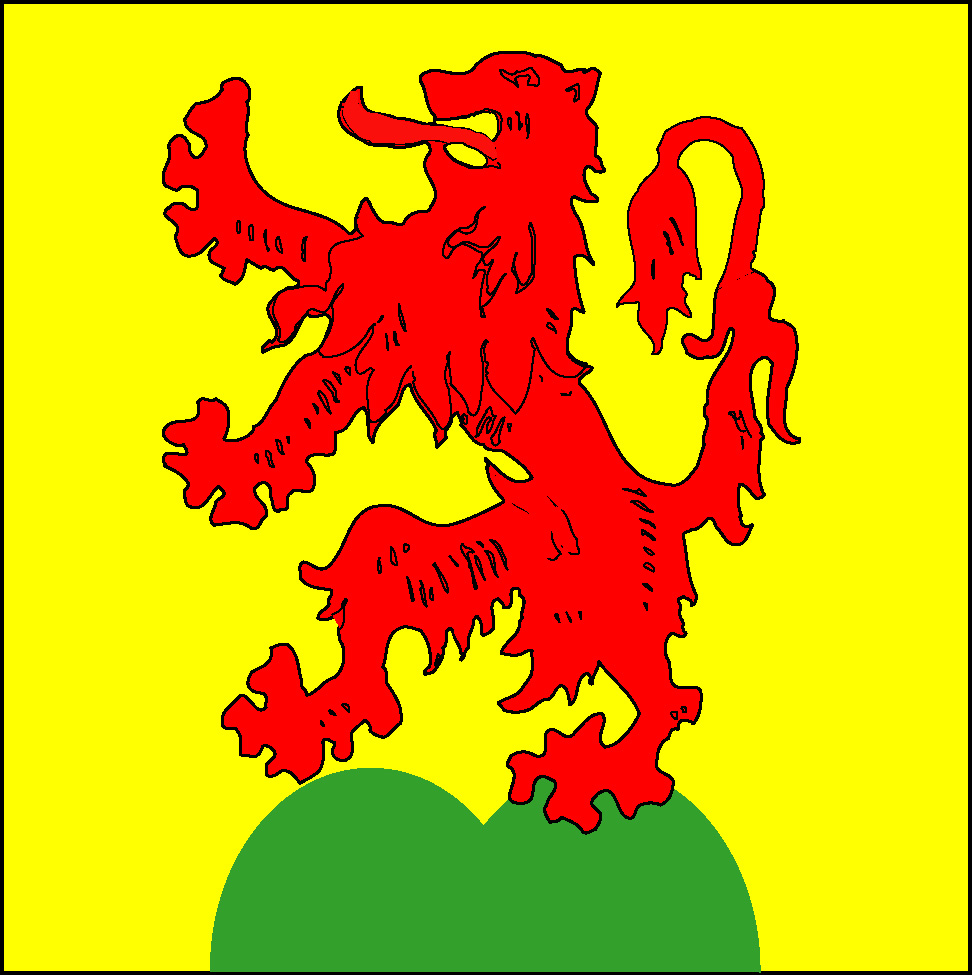
Écoteaux

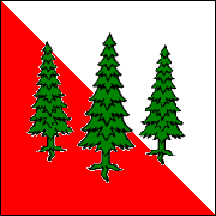
Épesses

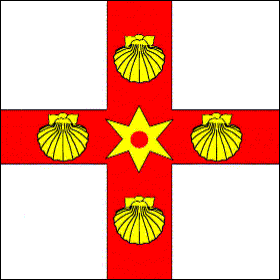
Goumoens-le-Jux

Malapalud

Oron-la-Ville

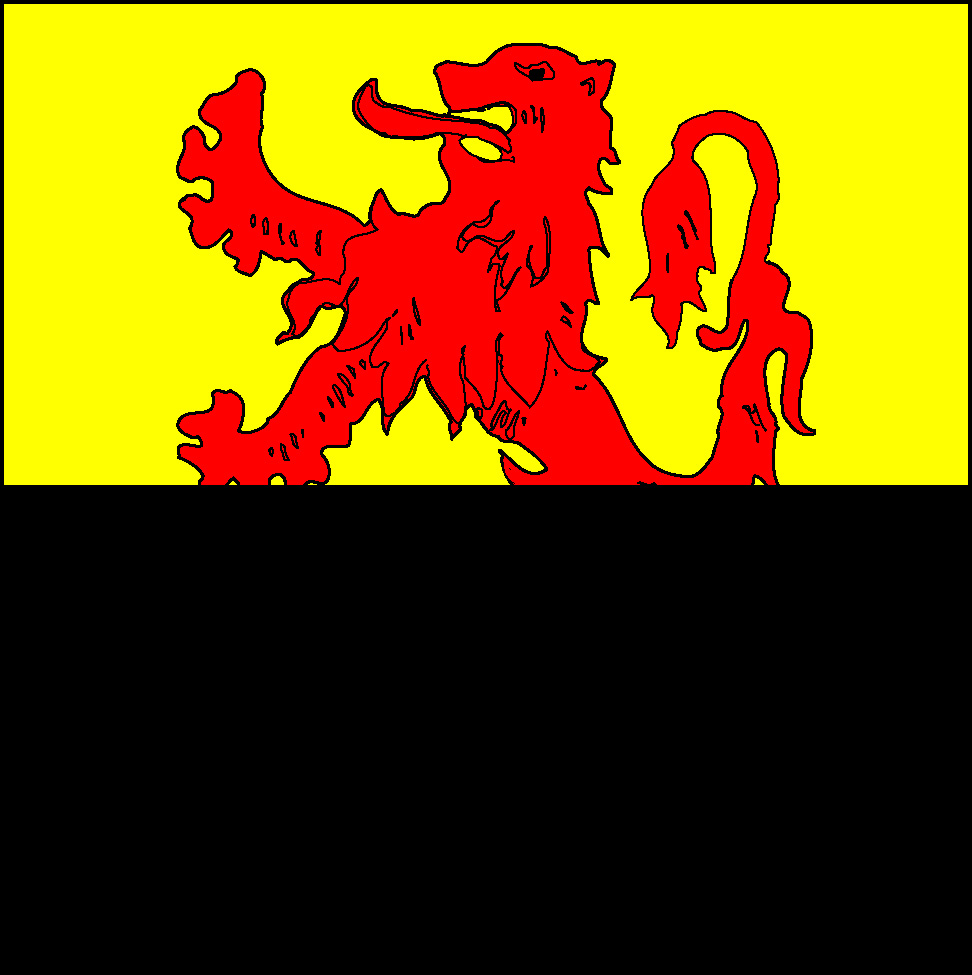
Palézieux

Saint-Légier-La Chiésaz

Sassel

Sévery

== Zug ==
Name	COA	Flag	Colours	Blazon and Symbolism	Date
Zug	Coat of arms of Zug			Argent, a fess azure	1319

== Zürich ==
Name	COA	Flag	Colours	Blazon and Symbolism	Date
Zürich	Coat of arms of Zürich			Per bend argent and azure	13th c.

Rüschlikon

Zollikon
