= Siebnen =

- Municipality
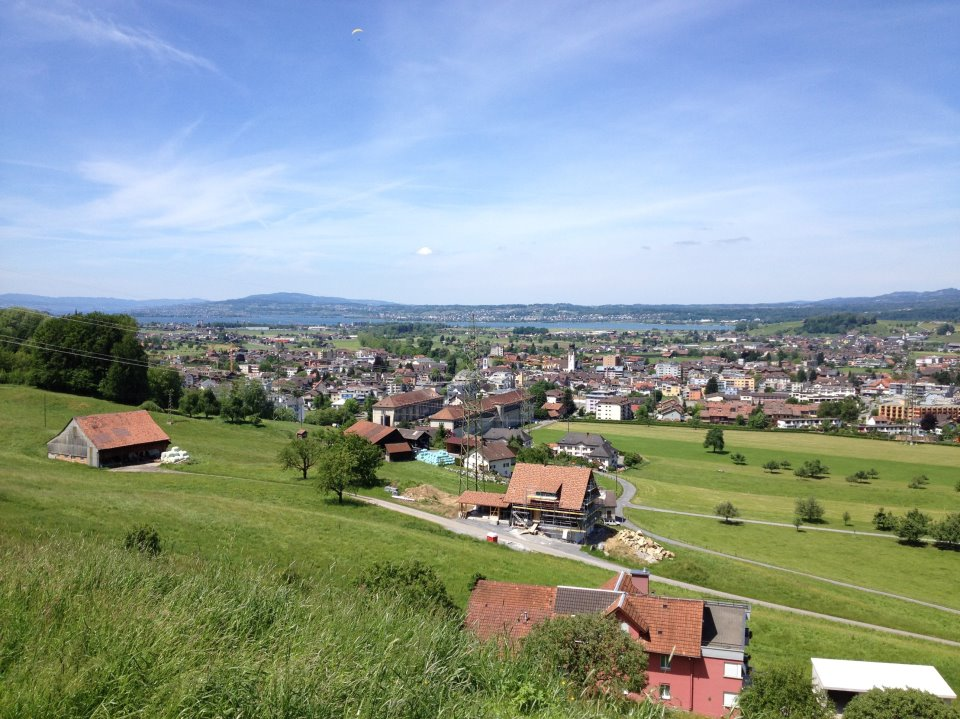

- Coat of arms
- Location of Siebnen
- Location within Switzerland Location within Canton of Schwyz
- Coordinates: 47°11′N 8°53′E
- Country: Switzerland
- Canton: Schwyz
- District: March
- Elevation: 446 m (1,463 ft)

Population (December 2020)
  - Total: 5,277
- Time zone: UTC+01:00 (CET)
  - Summer (DST): UTC+02:00 (CEST)
- Postal code: 8854
- ISO 3166 code: CH-SZ
- Surrounded by: Galgenen, Schübelbach, Vorderthal, Wangen
- Website: www.siebnen.ch

Siebnen is a village in district of March in the canton of Schwyz in Switzerland.

== Political affiliation ==
Aerial view (1953)

The village is politically Siebnen to the three communities Galgenen, Schübelbach and Wangen. The boundaries run right through the center. Siebnen thus consists of the districts Siebnen-Galgenen, Siebnen-Schübelbach and Siebnen-Wangen. Siebnen-Galgenen is separated from the rest of the Wägitaler Aa Siebnen place.
