= Maya Bamert =

Swiss bobsledder (born 1979)

Medal record

Women's bobsleigh

Representing Switzerland

European Championships
Bronze medal – third place	2008 Cesana	Two-woman

Maya Bamert (born 7 December 1979 in Lachen) is a Swiss bobsledder who has competed since 2003. She finished eighth in the two-woman event at the 2006 Winter Olympics in Turin.

Bamert also competed in the FIBT World Championships, earning her best finish of fifth in the two-woman event at St. Moritz in 2007.

== Career highlights ==
Olympic Winter Games
2006 - Turin, 8th with Martina Feusi
World Championships
2005 - Calgary, 13th with Regula Sterki
2007 - St. Moritz, 5th with Anne Dietrich
European Championships
2008 - Cesana, (bronze) 3rd with Anne Dietrich
