= Lachen, Switzerland =

Lachen
- Municipality
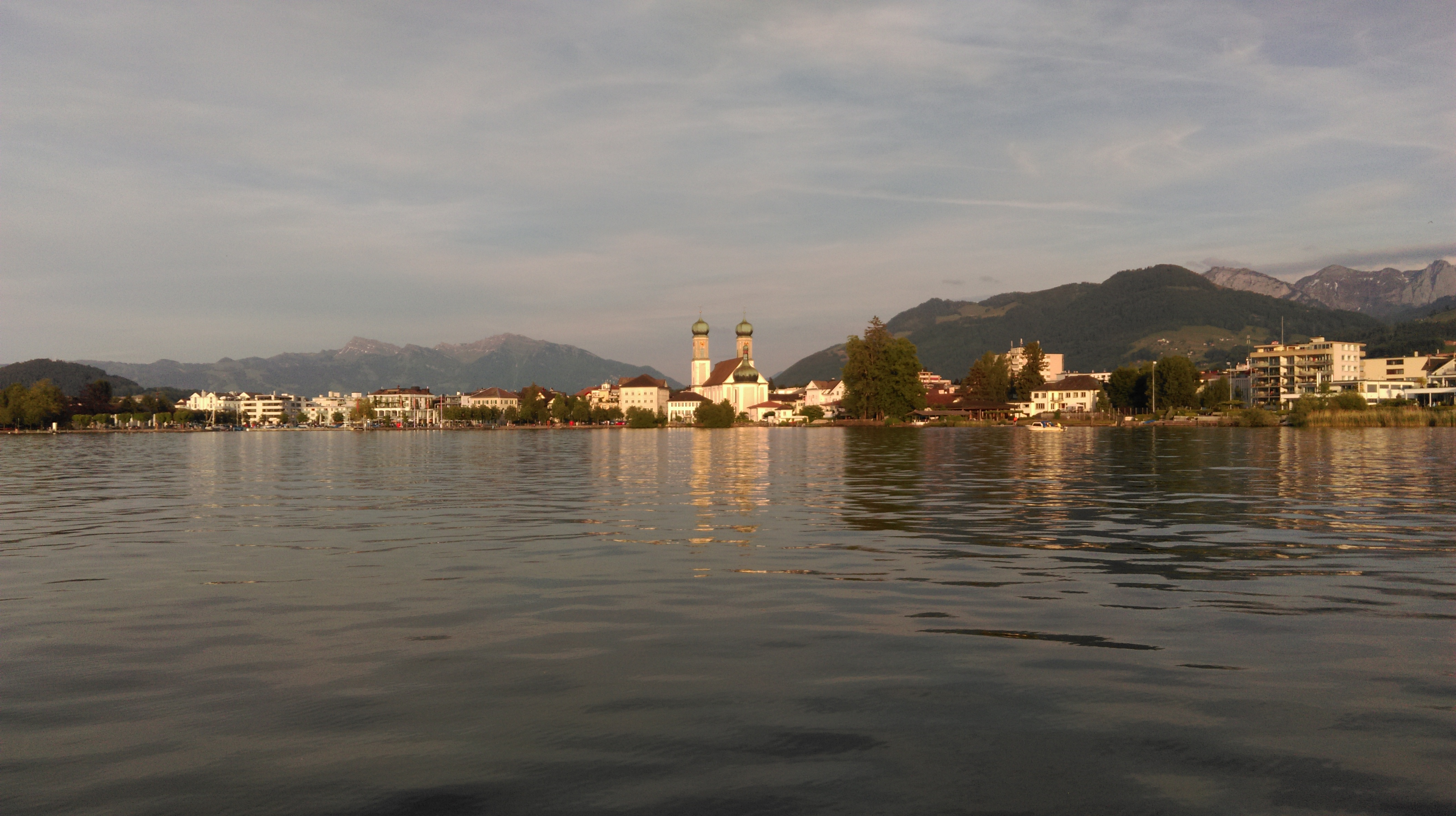
- Town of Lachen and Lake Zurich

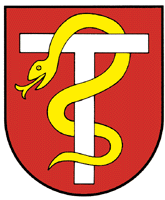
- Coat of arms
- Location of Lachen
- Location within Switzerland Location within Canton of Schwyz
- Coordinates: 47°11′N 8°51′E
- Country: Switzerland
- Canton: Schwyz
- District: March

Area
  - Total: 5.20 km^{2} (2.01 sq mi)
- Elevation: 408 m (1,339 ft)

Population (Dec 2014)
  - Total: 8,226
  - Density: 1,580/km^{2} (4,100/sq mi)
- Time zone: UTC+01:00 (CET)
  - Summer (DST): UTC+02:00 (CEST)
- Postal code: 8853
- SFOS number: 1344
- ISO 3166 code: CH-SZ
- Surrounded by: Altendorf, Galgenen, Jona (SG), Wangen
- Twin towns: Schramberg (Germany)
- Website: www.lachen.ch

Lachen (German pronunciation: [ˈlaxn̩]; High Alemannic: Lache) is a municipality in March District in the canton of Schwyz in Switzerland.

== History ==
Aerial view by Walter Mittelholzer (1919)

Lachen is first mentioned around 1217–22 as de Lachun.

== Geography ==
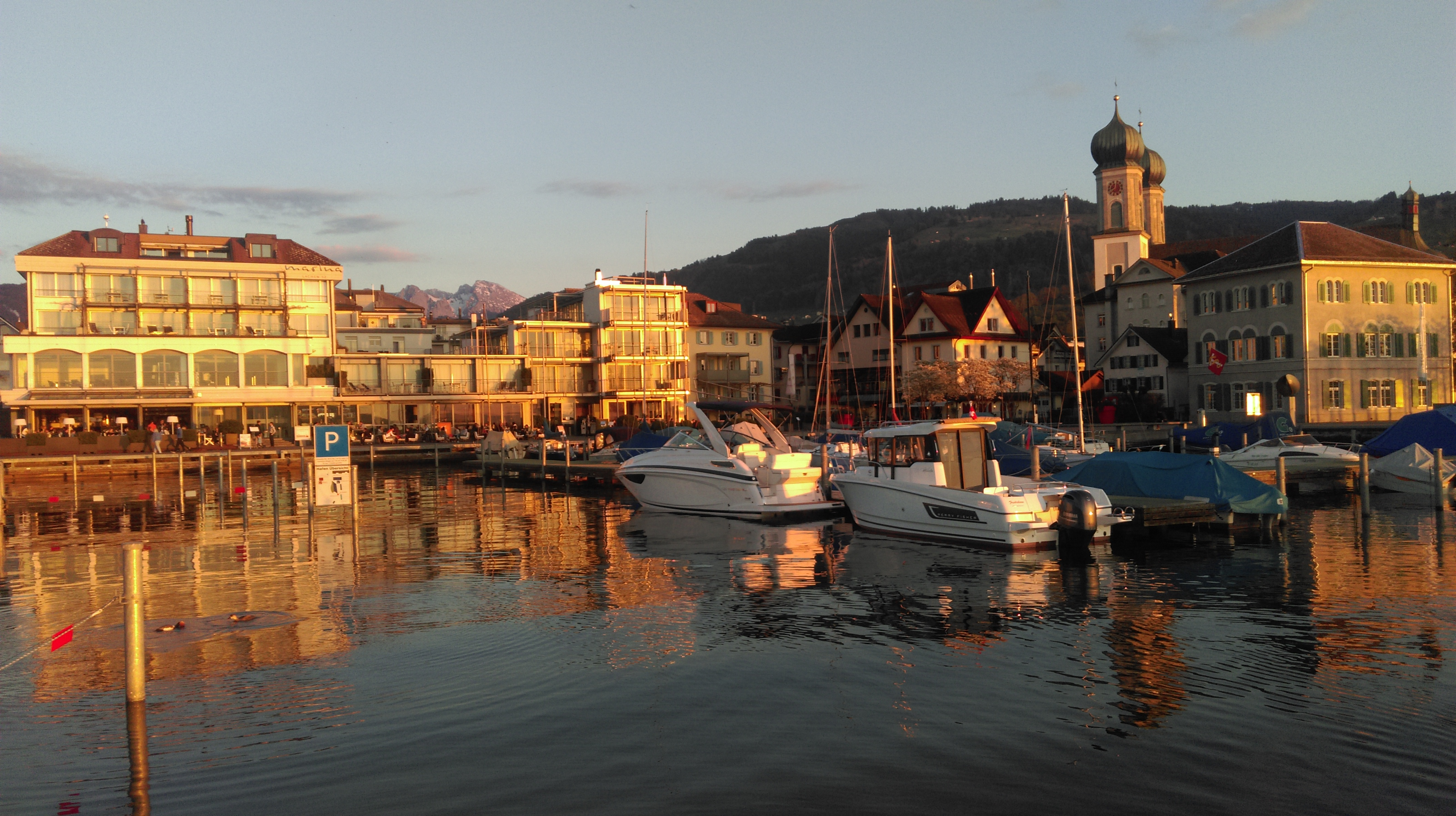
The marina of Lachen at sunset. Due to its western-facing position, Lachen is known as the "town with the best sunset-views on lake Zurich".

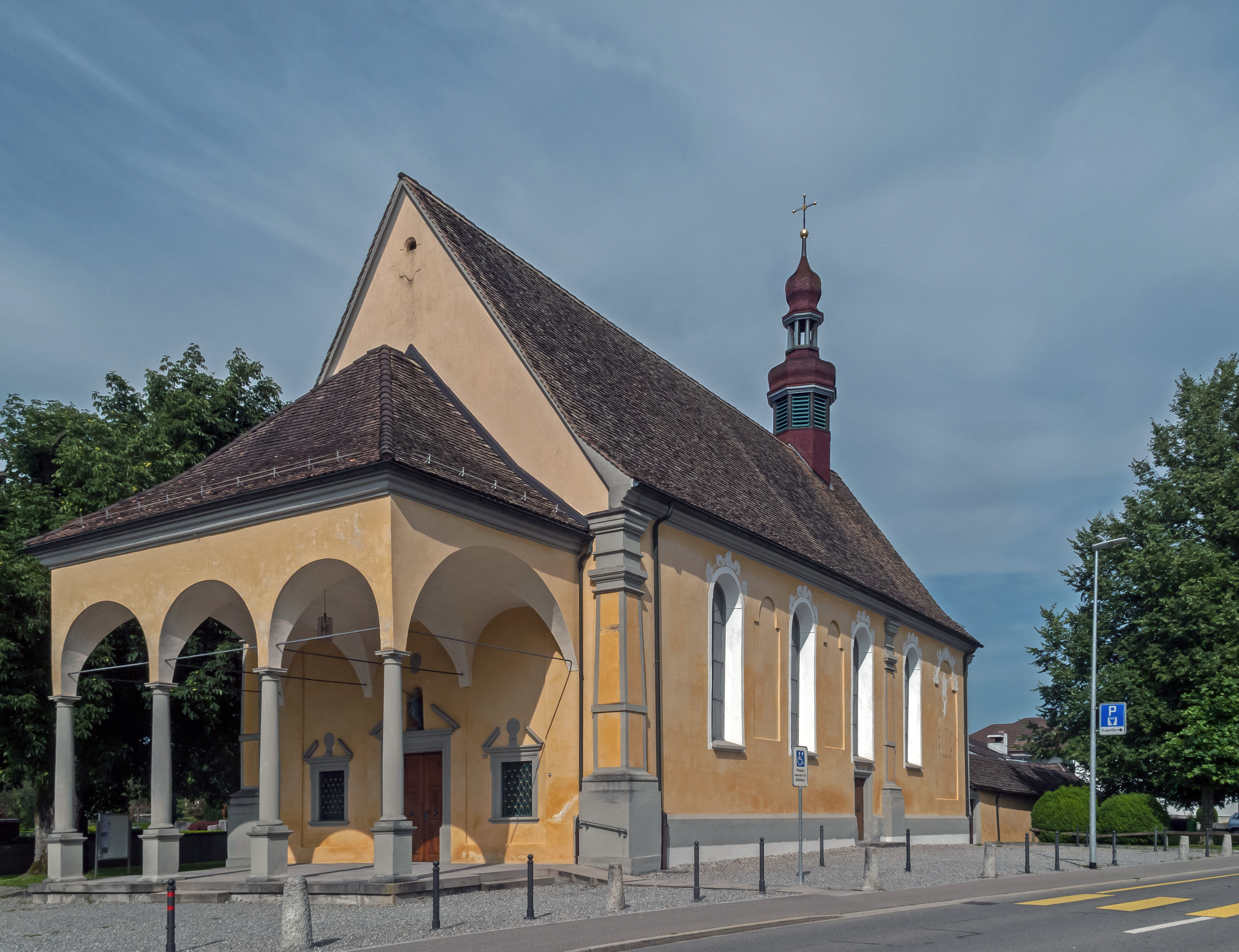
Lachen, church

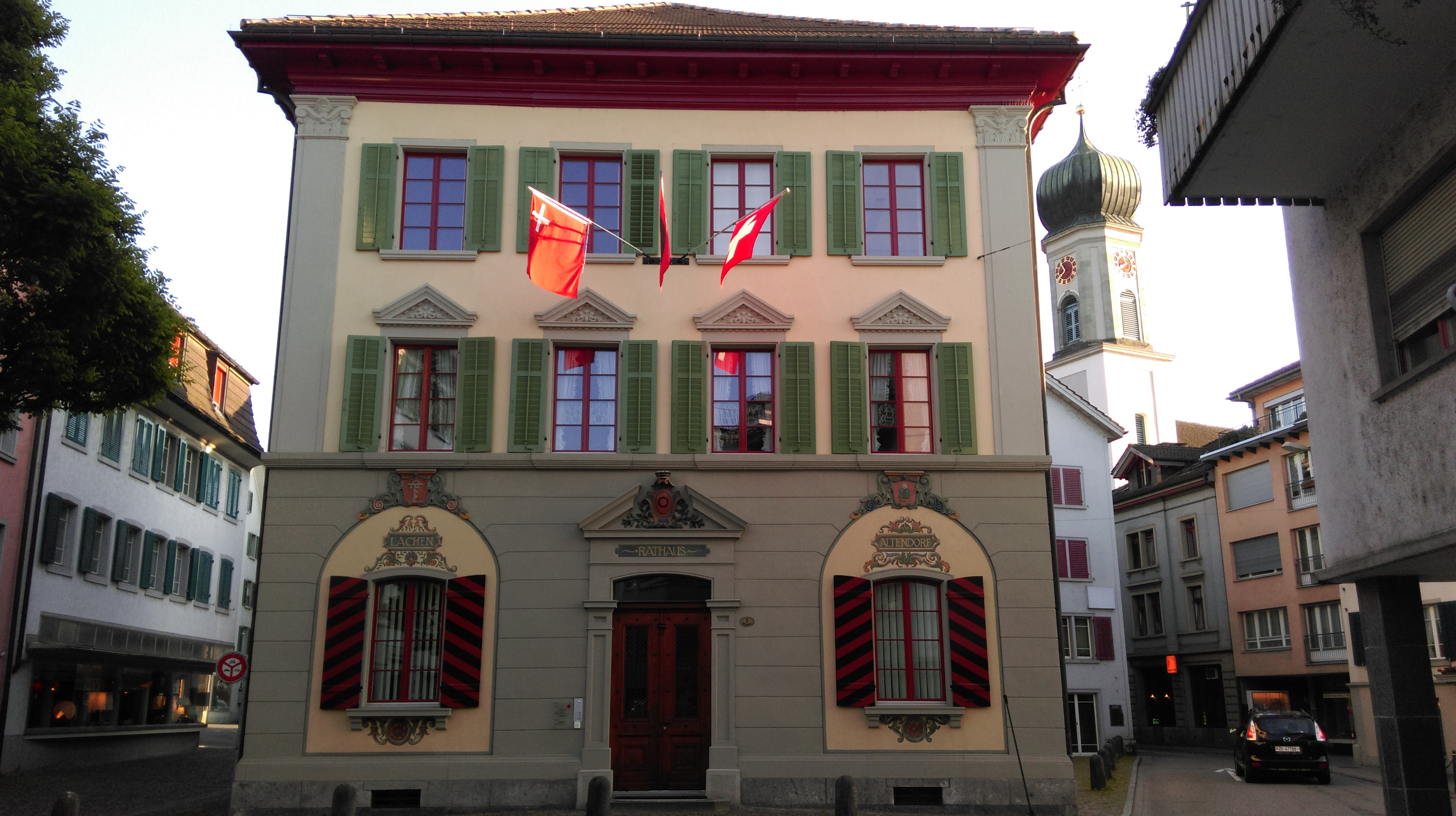
The old town hall of Lachen SZ, built in 1506. In the background one of the two towers of the "Pfarrkirche Heilig Kreuz" (anno 1708/11).

Lachen has an area of 2.4 km^{2} (0.93 sq mi), as of 2006. Of this area, 26.7% is used for agricultural purposes, while 5.8% is forested. Of the remaining land, 62.1% is settled (buildings or roads) and the remainder (5.4%) is non-productive (rivers, glaciers or mountains). The highest point is 420 meters above sea level, the deepest point is 406 meters above sea level. The municipality area has a size of 519 ha (5,2km²), 54.7% of that are on the Obersee (Lake Zurich)

The municipality is located on a delta of the Wägi river. It is the smallest municipality in the Canton of Schwyz.

== Demographics ==
Lachen has a population of 9,137. As of 2007, 27.2% of the population was made up of foreign nationals. Over the last 10 years the population has grown at a rate of 14.1%. The majority of the population speaks German (84.9%), followed by Italian (5.1%) and Albanian (2.4%).

As of 2000 the gender distribution of the population was 49.1% male and 50.9% female. 1293 people or 20.6% of the population is under 19. 1950 people or 31.1% are 20 to 39, and 2,055 people or 32.8% are 40 to 64. 489 people or 7.8% are 65 to 74. There are 347 people or 5.5% who are 70 to 79 and 138 people or 2.20% of the population who are over 80. There is one person in Lachen who is over 100 years old.

As of 2000 there are 2,817 households, of which 1,039 households (or about 36.9%) contain only one person. 115 or about 4.1% are large households, with at least five occupants.

In the 2007 election the most popular party was the SVP which received 43.2% of the vote. The next three most popular parties were the FDP (19.4%), the SPS (19.1%) and the CVP (13.9%).

In Lachen about 69.2% of the adult population (between 25 and 64) have completed either non-mandatory upper secondary education or additional higher education (either university or a Fachhochschule).

Lachen has an unemployment rate of 1.98%. As of 2005, there were 61 people employed in the primary economic sector and about 7 businesses involved in this sector. 859 people are employed in the secondary sector and there are 84 businesses in this sector. 2,686 people are employed in the tertiary sector, with 370 businesses in this sector.

According to the 2000 census, 4,141 or 66.0% of the population are Roman Catholic, while 984 or 15.7% belonged to the Swiss Reformed Church. Of the rest of the population, there are 179 individuals (or about 2.85% of the population) who belong to the Orthodox Church, and there are less than 5 individuals who belong to another Christian church. There are less than 5 individuals who are Jewish, and 413 (or about 6.58% of the population) who are Muslim. There are 38 individuals (or about 0.61% of the population) who belong to another church (not listed on the census), 336 (or about 5.36% of the population) are agnostic or atheist, and 178 individuals (or about 2.84% of the population) did not answer the question.

The historic population is given in the following table:

year	population
1850	1,506
1900	1,971
1950	3,458
1970	4,914
1980	5,456
1990	5,995
2000	6,317
2005	6,765
2007	6,977
2010	7,809
2015	8,480
2020	9,137

== Weather ==
Lachen has an average of 149.1 days of rain per year and receives on average 1,428 mm (56.2 in) of precipitation. The wettest month is August during which time Lachen receives an average of 186 mm (7.3 in) of precipitation. During this month there is precipitation for an average of 14.2 days. The month with the most days of precipitation is May, with an average of 14.7, but with only 139 mm (5.5 in) of precipitation. The driest month of the year is January with an average of 80 mm (3.1 in) of precipitation over 14.2 days.

== Transportation ==
The municipality is located on the A3 motorway.

Lachen railway station is a stop on the Lake Zürich left-bank railway line and served by the Zürich S-Bahn services S2, which runs every half-hour between Zürich and Ziegelbrücke, and S25, which runs hourly between Zürich and Linthal. The journey time to Zürich is between 30 and 40 minutes.

== Famous citizens ==
- Joachim Raff (1822 in Lachen – 1882) a German-Swiss composer, teacher and pianist
- Alessandro Spezialetti (born 1975 in Lachen) an Italian former professional road bicycle racer
- Maya Bamert (born 1979 in Lachen) a Swiss bobsledder, competed at the 2006 Winter Olympics
- Josip Drmić (born 1992 in Lachen) a Swiss professional footballer
