= March District =

Coordinates: 47°11′N 8°51′E

March District Bezirk March
- District
- Flag Coat of arms
- Country: Switzerland
- Canton: Schwyz
- Capital: Lachen

Government
  - Bezirksammann: Paul Baumann

Area
  - Total: 177.1 km^{2} (68.4 sq mi)

Population (December 2020)
  - Total: 44,558
  - Density: 251.6/km^{2} (651.6/sq mi)
- Time zone: UTC+1 (CET)
  - Summer (DST): UTC+2 (CEST)
- Municipalities: 9
- Website: https://www.bezirk-march.ch (in German)

March District is a district of the canton of Schwyz, Switzerland. The coat of arms of the district is gules, an annulet sable — a black ring on a red background. It has a population of 44,558 (as of 31 December 2020). The current Bezirksammann of the district is Paul Baumann.

Coat of arms	Municipality	Population (31 December 2020)	Area (km^{2})
Altendorf	Altendorf	7,111	20.5
Galgenen	Galgenen	5,277	13.3
Innerthal	Innerthal	178	50.2
Lachen	Lachen	9,137	2.4
Reichenburg	Reichenburg	3,891	11.6
Schübelbach	Schübelbach	9,289	29.0
Tuggen	Tuggen	3,317	13.6
Vorderthal	Vorderthal	1,014	28.0
Wangen SZ	Wangen SZ	5,344	8.5
	Total	44,558	177.1
