= Altendorf, Schwyz =

Altendorf
- Municipality
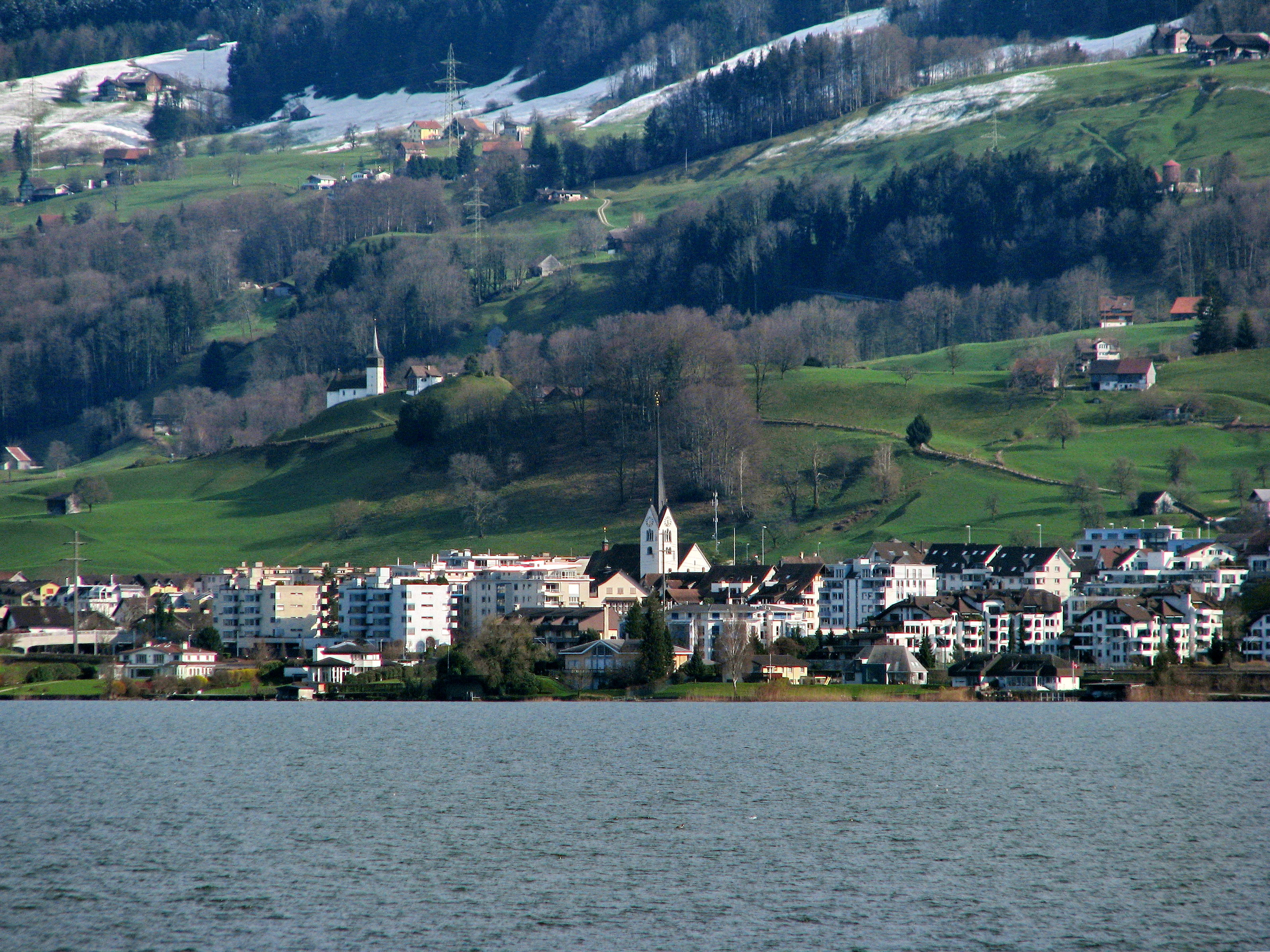

- Flag Coat of arms
- Location of Altendorf
- Location within Switzerland Location within Canton of Schwyz
- Coordinates: 47°11′N 8°49′E
- Country: Switzerland
- Canton: Schwyz
- District: March

Area
  - Total: 23.50 km^{2} (9.07 sq mi)
- Elevation: 421 m (1,381 ft)

Population (December 2020)
  - Total: 7,111
  - Density: 302.6/km^{2} (783.7/sq mi)
- Time zone: UTC+01:00 (CET)
  - Summer (DST): UTC+02:00 (CEST)
- Postal code: 8852
- SFOS number: 1341
- ISO 3166 code: CH-SZ
- Surrounded by: Einsiedeln, Freienbach, Galgenen, Jona (SG), Lachen, Rapperswil (SG), Vorderthal
- Website: www.altendorf.ch

Altendorf (Swiss Standard German pronunciation: [ˈaltn̩ˌdɔrf], lit. 'old village') is a municipality in March District in the canton of Schwyz in Switzerland.

== History ==
Altendorf is first mentioned in 972 as Rahprehteswilare.

In 1932, construction started on the Etzelwerk, a hydro-electric power station to generate power for the Swiss Federal Railways. By 1937, the power station was complete and in operation. The plant continues in use today, and takes its water supply from the Sihlsee reservoir that lies 5 kilometres (3 mi) to the south-west.

== Geography ==
Aerial view (1953)

Altendorf has an area, as of 2006, of 20.5 km^{2} (7.9 sq mi). Of this area, 52.6% is used for agricultural purposes, while 37.5% is forested. Of the rest of the land, 9.4% is settled (buildings or roads) and the remainder (0.4%) is non-productive (rivers, glaciers or mountains).

The municipality is located on the Obersee section of Lake Zurich. It is along the rail line Pfäffikon-Lachen and on the A3 motorway. It consists of the village of Altendorf and the hamlets of Seestatt along the lake and the hamlets of Muschelberg, Mittlisberg, Schlipf and Vorderberg in the pre-alpine hills as well as a suburb of Lachen, the hamlet of Steinegg.

== Demographics ==
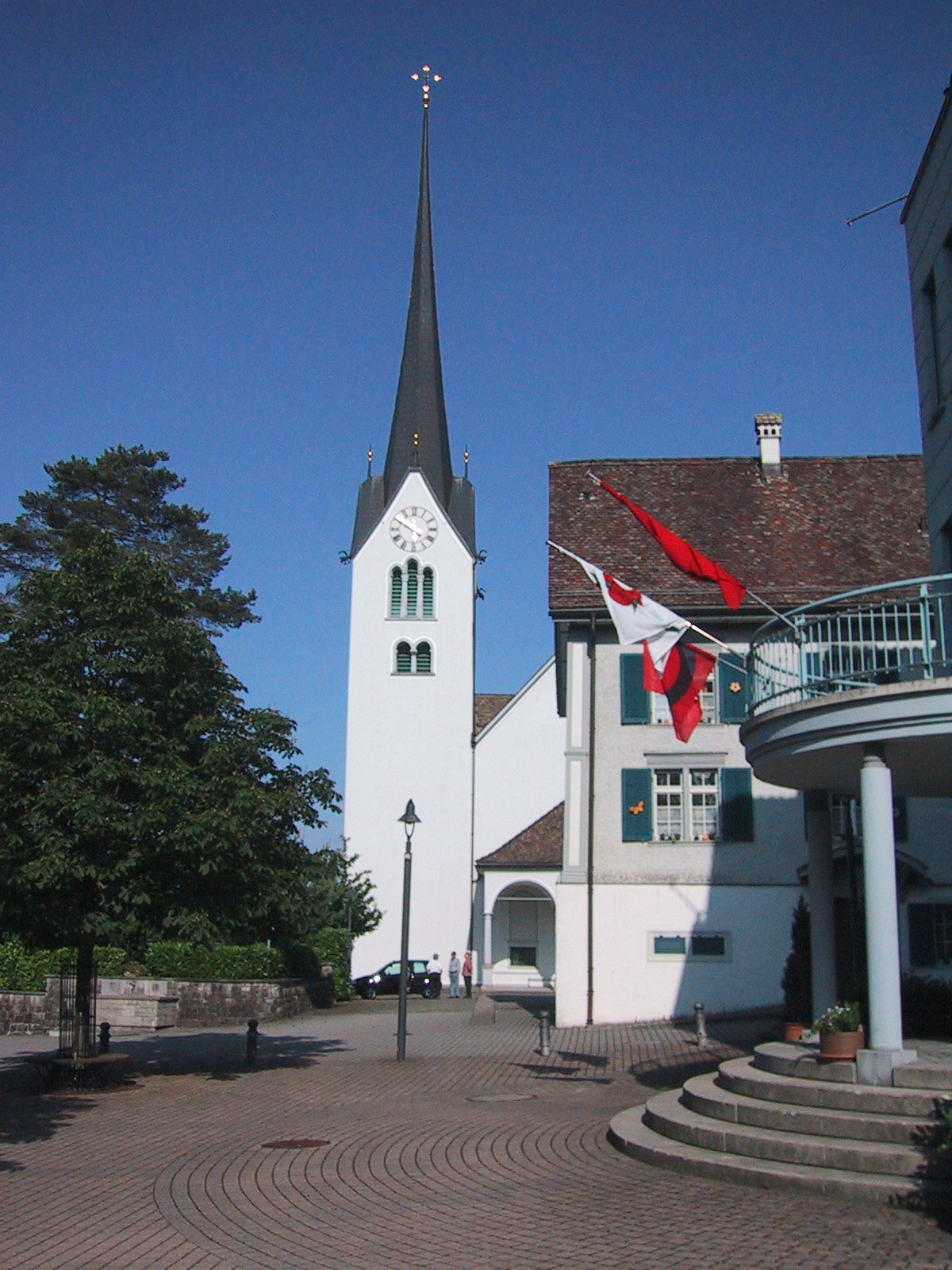
The church of Altendorf

Altendorf has a population (as of 31 December 2020) of 7,111. As of 2007, 16.8% of the population was made up of foreign nationals. Over the last 10 years the population has grown at a rate of 32.4%. Most of the population (as of 2000) speaks German (91.1%), with Italian being second most common ( 1.4%) and Albanian being third ( 1.3%).

As of 2000 the gender distribution of the population was 51.1% male and 48.9% female. The age distribution, as of 2008, in Altendorf is; 1,196 people or 25.8% of the population is between 0 and 19. 1,372 people or 29.6% are 20 to 39, and 1,597 people or 34.4% are 40 to 64. The senior population distribution is 286 people or 6.2% are 65 to 74. There are 141 people or 3.0% who are 70 to 79 and 46 people or 0.99% of the population who are over 80. There is one person in Altendorf who is over 100 years old.

As of 2000 there are 1,786 households, of which 471 households (or about 26.4%) contain only a single individual. 147 or about 8.2% are large households, with at least five members.

In the 2007 election the most popular party was the SVP which received 47.1% of the vote. The next three most popular parties were the CVP (17.8%), the FDP (16.7%) and the SPS (13.9%).

In Altendorf about 71.9% of the population (between age 25-64) have completed either non-mandatory upper secondary education or additional higher education (either University or a Fachhochschule).

Altendorf has an unemployment rate of 1.76%. As of 2005, there were 227 people employed in the primary economic sector and about 83 businesses involved in this sector. 857 people are employed in the secondary sector and there are 105 businesses in this sector. 1,238 people are employed in the tertiary sector, with 211 businesses in this sector.

From the 2000 census, 3,108 or 67.0% are Roman Catholic, while 810 or 17.5% belonged to the Swiss Reformed Church. Of the rest of the population, there are less than 5 individuals who belong to the Christian Catholic faith, there are 87 individuals (or about 1.88% of the population) who belong to the Orthodox Church, and there are 6 individuals (or about 0.13% of the population) who belong to another Christian church. There are less than 5 individuals who are Jewish, and 159 (or about 3.43% of the population) who are Islamic. There are 32 individuals (or about 0.69% of the population) who belong to another church (not listed on the census), 294 (or about 6.34% of the population) belong to no church, are agnostic or atheist, and 138 individuals (or about 2.98% of the population) did not answer the question.

The historical population is given in the following table:

year	population
1743	745
1799	978
1850	1,403
1900	1,279
1950	2,079
1970	2,348
1980	3,000
1985	3,513
1990	3,671
2000	4,571
2005	5,392
2007	5,788

== Transportation ==
Altendorf railway station is a stop on the Zurich S-Bahn service S2, between Zurich and Ziegelbrücke.
