= Innerthal =

- Municipality
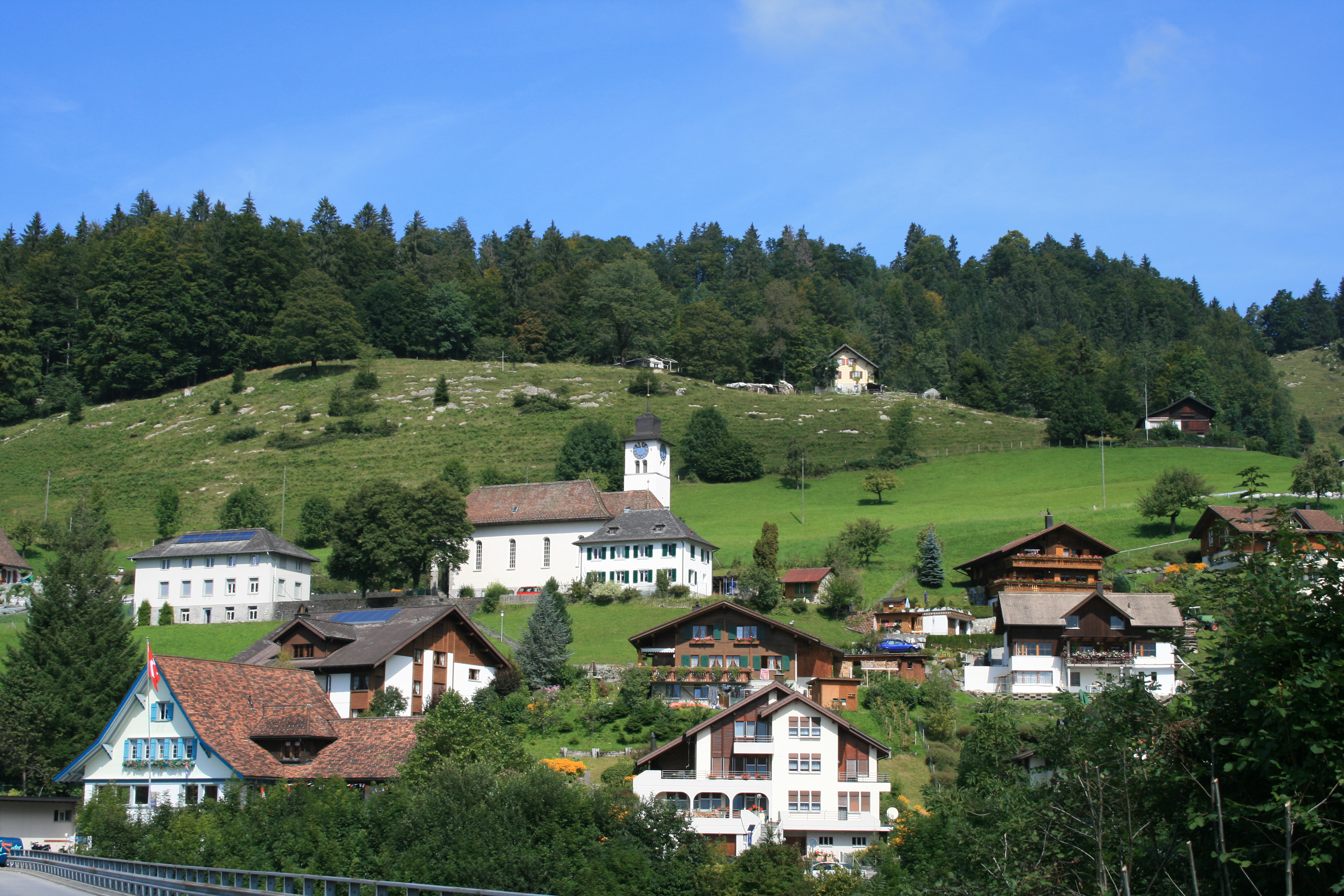

- Coat of arms
- Location of Innerthal
- Location within Switzerland Location within Canton of Schwyz
- Coordinates: 47°6′N 8°55′E
- Country: Switzerland
- Canton: Schwyz
- District: March

Area
  - Total: 50.22 km^{2} (19.39 sq mi)
- Elevation: 915 m (3,002 ft)

Population (December 2020)
  - Total: 178
  - Density: 3.54/km^{2} (9.18/sq mi)
- Time zone: UTC+01:00 (CET)
  - Summer (DST): UTC+02:00 (CEST)
- Postal code: 8858
- SFOS number: 1343
- ISO 3166 code: CH-SZ
- Localities: Wägitalersee
- Surrounded by: Einsiedeln, Glarus (GL), Muotathal, Näfels (GL), Oberurnen (GL), Schübelbach, Unteriberg, Vorderthal
- Website: www.innerthal.ch

Innerthal is a municipality in March District in the canton of Schwyz in Switzerland.

== History ==
Innerthal is first mentioned in 1259 as Wegental. Until 1888 it was known as Hinterwäggithal.

== Geography ==
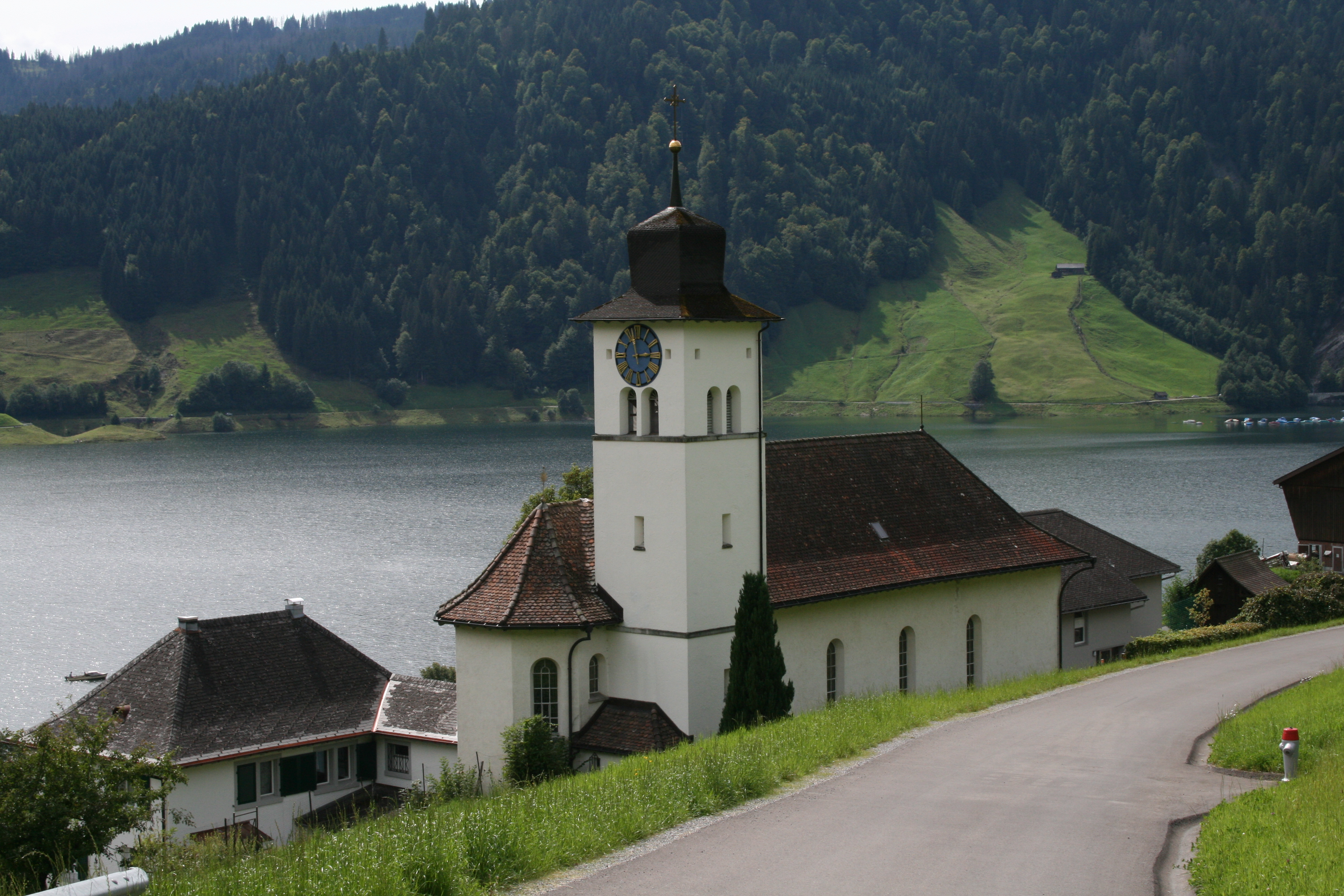
The church

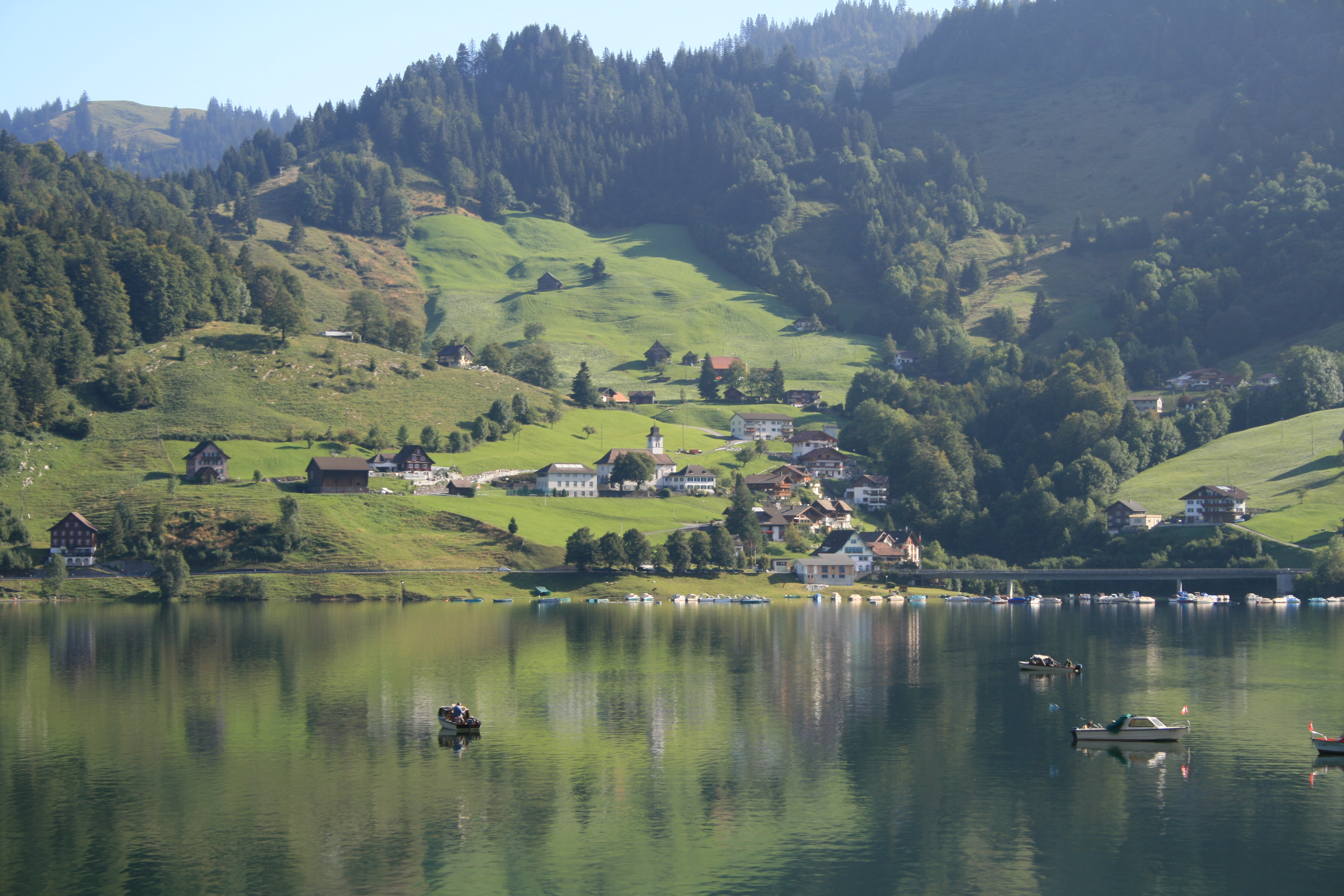
Wägitalersee in the Summer

Aerial view by Walter Mittelholzer (1923)

As of 2006 Innerthal has an area of 50.2 km^{2} (19.4 sq mi). Of this area, 34.9% is used for agricultural purposes, while 34.1% is forested. Of the rest of the land, 0.4% is settled (buildings or roads) and the remainder (30.6%) is non-productive (rivers, glaciers or mountains).

The municipality is located on Wägitalersee, a reservoir in the upper Wägital.

== Demographics ==
Innerthal has a population (as of 31 December 2020) of 178. As of 2007, 2.1% of the population was made up of foreign nationals. Over the last 10 years the population has grown at a rate of 5%. Most of the population (as of 2000) speaks German (97.0%), with Italian being second most common ( 1.8%) and Rhaeto-romance being third ( 0.6%).

As of 2000 the gender distribution of the population was 48.5% male and 51.5% female. The age distribution, as of 2008, in Innerthal is; 46 people or 27.5% of the population is between 0 and 19. 44 people or 26.3% are 20 to 39, and 56 people or 33.5% are 40 to 64. The senior population distribution is 15 people or 9.0% are 65 to 74. There are 6 people or 3.6% who are 70 to 79 and no one is over 80.

As of 2000 there are 64 households, of which 13 households (or about 20.3%) contain only a single individual. 5 or about 7.8% are large households, with at least five members.

In the 2007 election the most popular party was the CVP which received 54.8% of the vote. The next three most popular parties were the SVP (28.3%), the FDP (13.8%) and the SPS (2.5%).

The entire Swiss population is generally well educated. In Innerthal about 44.5% of the population (between age 25-64) have completed either non-mandatory upper secondary education or additional higher education (either university or a Fachhochschule).

Innerthal has an unemployment rate of 0%. As of 2005, there were 22 people employed in the primary economic sector and about 10 businesses involved in this sector. 41 people are employed in the tertiary sector, with 8 businesses in this sector.

From the 2000 census, 156 or 93.4% are Roman Catholic, while 8 or 4.8% belonged to the Swiss Reformed Church. There are less than 5 individuals who belong to no church, are agnostic or atheist, and less than 5 individuals did not answer the question.

The historical population is given in the following table:

year	population
1850	302
1900	363
1930	(na
1950	210
1990	151
2000	167

== Weather ==
Innerthal has an average of 170.8 days of rain per year and on average receives 2,246 mm (88.4 in) of precipitation. The wettest month is June during which time Innerthal receives an average of 284 mm (11.2 in) of precipitation. During this month there is precipitation for an average of 17.1 days. The driest month of the year is October with an average of 131 mm (5.2 in) of precipitation over 17.1 days.
