= Vorderthal =

- Municipality
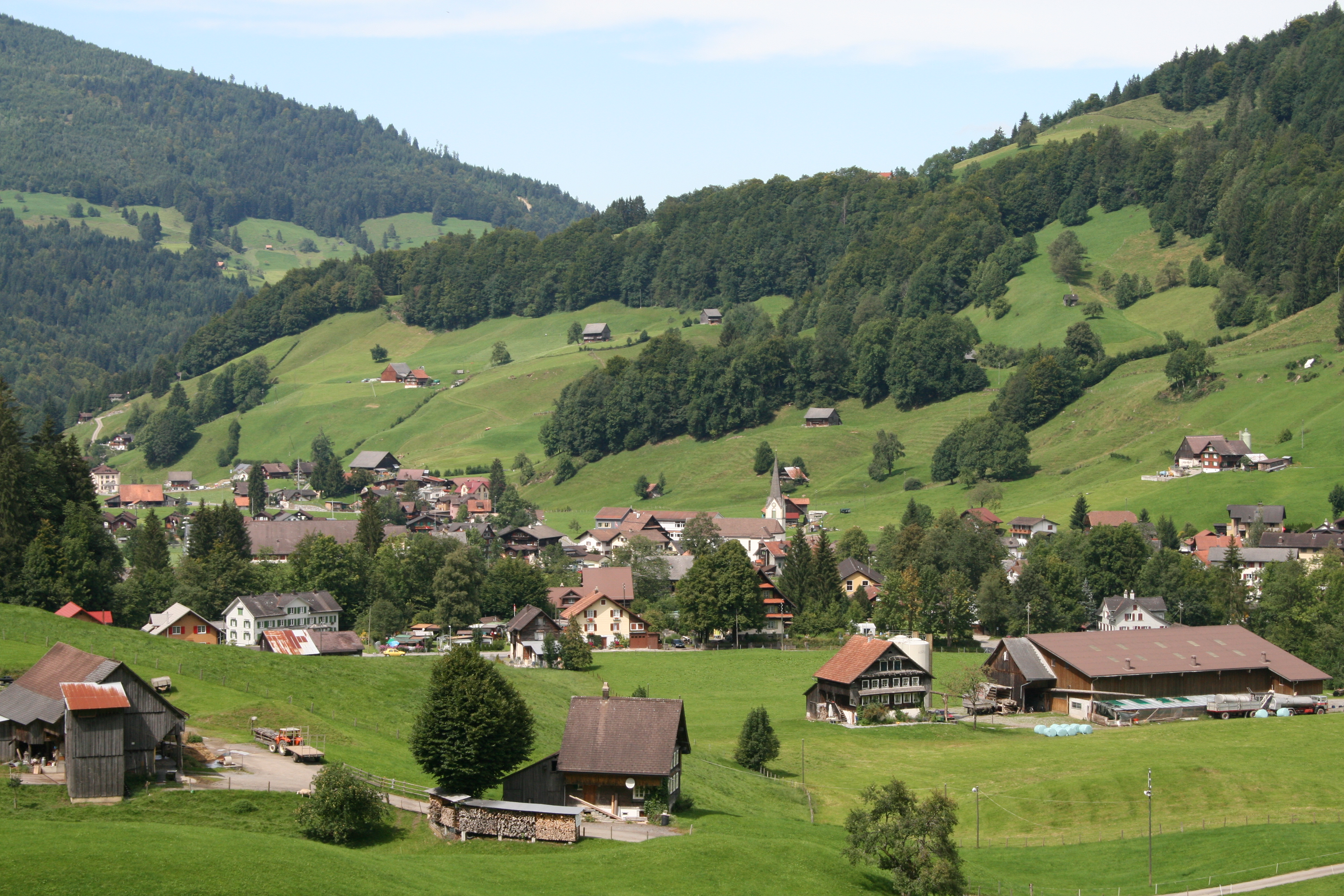

- Coat of arms
- Location of Vorderthal
- Location within Switzerland Location within Canton of Schwyz
- Coordinates: 47°7′N 8°54′E
- Country: Switzerland
- Canton: Schwyz
- District: March

Area
  - Total: 28.0 km^{2} (10.8 sq mi)
- Elevation: 735 m (2,411 ft)

Population (December 2020)
  - Total: 1,014
  - Density: 36.2/km^{2} (93.8/sq mi)
- Time zone: UTC+01:00 (CET)
  - Summer (DST): UTC+02:00 (CEST)
- Postal code: 8857
- SFOS number: 1348
- ISO 3166 code: CH-SZ
- Surrounded by: Altendorf, Einsiedeln, Galgenen, Innerthal, Schübelbach
- Website: www.vorderthal.ch

Vorderthal is a municipality in March District in the canton of Schwyz in Switzerland.

== Geography ==
Aerial view by Walter Mittelholzer (1935)

Vorderthal has an area, as of 2006, of 28 km^{2} (11 sq mi). Of this area, 35.3% is used for agricultural purposes, while 59.8% is forested. Of the rest of the land, 2% is settled (buildings or roads) and the remainder (2.9%) is non-productive (rivers, glaciers or mountains).

== Demographics ==
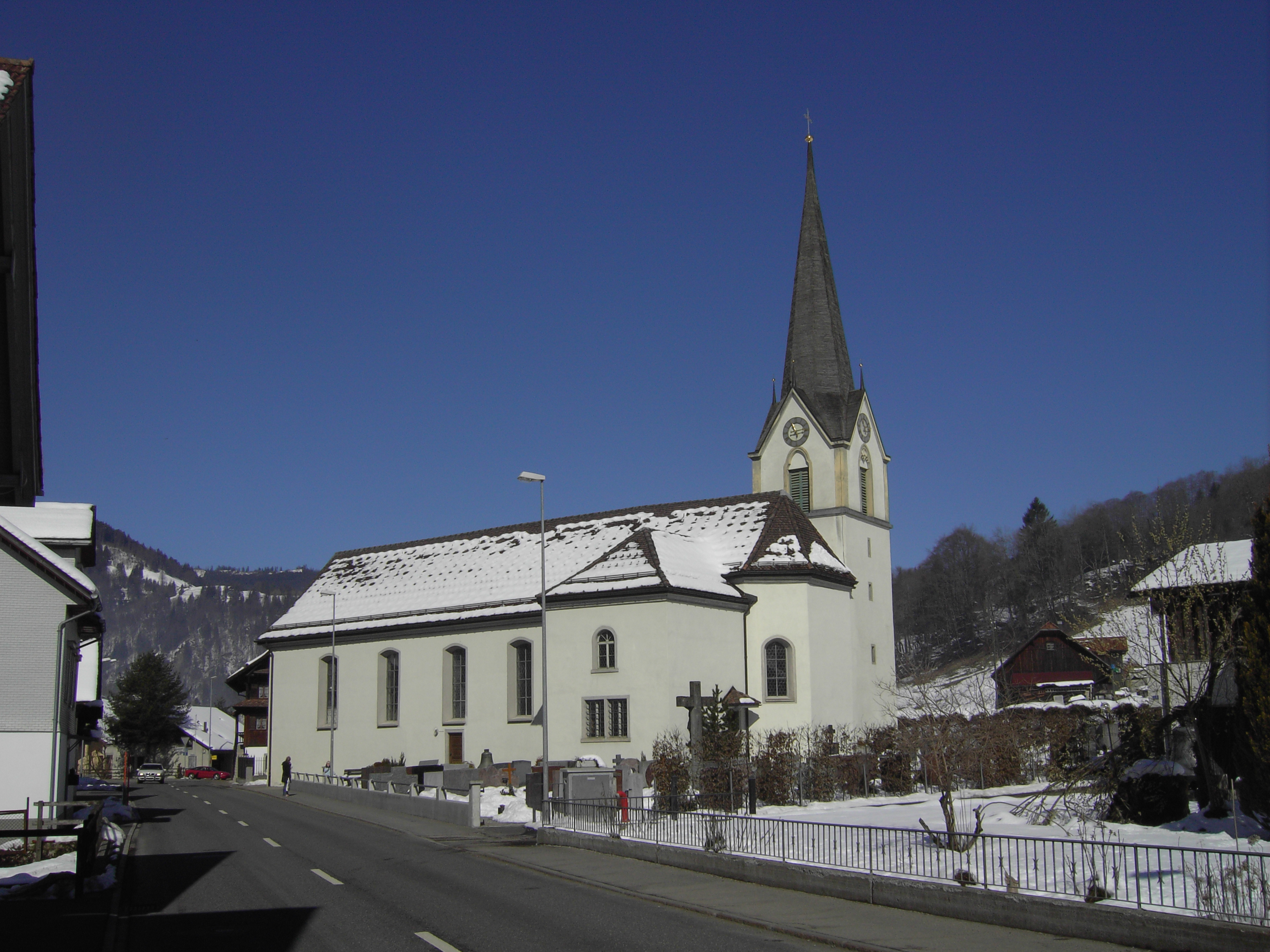
Church Vorderthal

Vorderthal has a population (as of 31 December 2020) of 1,014. As of 2007, 6.3% of the population was made up of foreign nationals. Over the last 10 years the population has decreased at a rate of -3.4%. Most of the population (as of 2000) speaks German (98.3%), with Albanian being second most common ( 0.5%) and Italian being third ( 0.4%).

As of 2000 the gender distribution of the population was 52.0% male and 48.0% female. The age distribution, as of 2008, in Vorderthal is; 291 people or 29.5% of the population is between 0 and 19. 268 people or 27.1% are 20 to 39, and 298 people or 30.2% are 40 to 64. The senior population distribution is 76 people or 7.7% are 65 to 74. There are 45 people or 4.6% who are 70 to 79 and 10 people or 1.01% of the population who are over 80.

As of 2000 there are 358 households, of which 78 households (or about 21.8%) contain only a single individual. 29 or about 8.1% are large households, with at least five members.

In the 2007 election the most popular party was the SVP which received 58.1% of the vote. The next three most popular parties were the FDP (22.1%), the CVP (13.6%) and the SPS (4%).

In Vorderthal about 45.2% of the population (between age 25-64) have completed either non-mandatory upper secondary education or additional higher education (either university or a Fachhochschule).

Vorderthal has an unemployment rate of 0.75%. As of 2005, there were 116 people employed in the primary economic sector and about 54 businesses involved in this sector. 107 people are employed in the secondary sector and there are 15 businesses in this sector. 56 people are employed in the tertiary sector, with 21 businesses in this sector.

From the 2000 census, 831 or 84.1% are Roman Catholic, while 80 or 8.1% belonged to the Swiss Reformed Church. Of the rest of the population, there are less than 5 individuals who belong to the Orthodox Church. There are 5 (or about 0.51% of the population) who are Islamic. There are less than 5 individuals who belong to another church (not listed on the census), 27 (or about 2.73% of the population) belong to no church, are agnostic or atheist, and 40 individuals (or about 4.05% of the population) did not answer the question.

The historical population is given in the following table:

year	population
1950	930
1960	918
1970	873
1980	819
1985	890
1990	946
2000	1,012
2005	1,002
2007	1,001
2010	1,025
2011	1,025
2012	1,014
2013	1,015
2014	1,032
2015	1,014
2016	1,016
2017	1,025
2018	1,015
