= Galgenen =

- Municipality
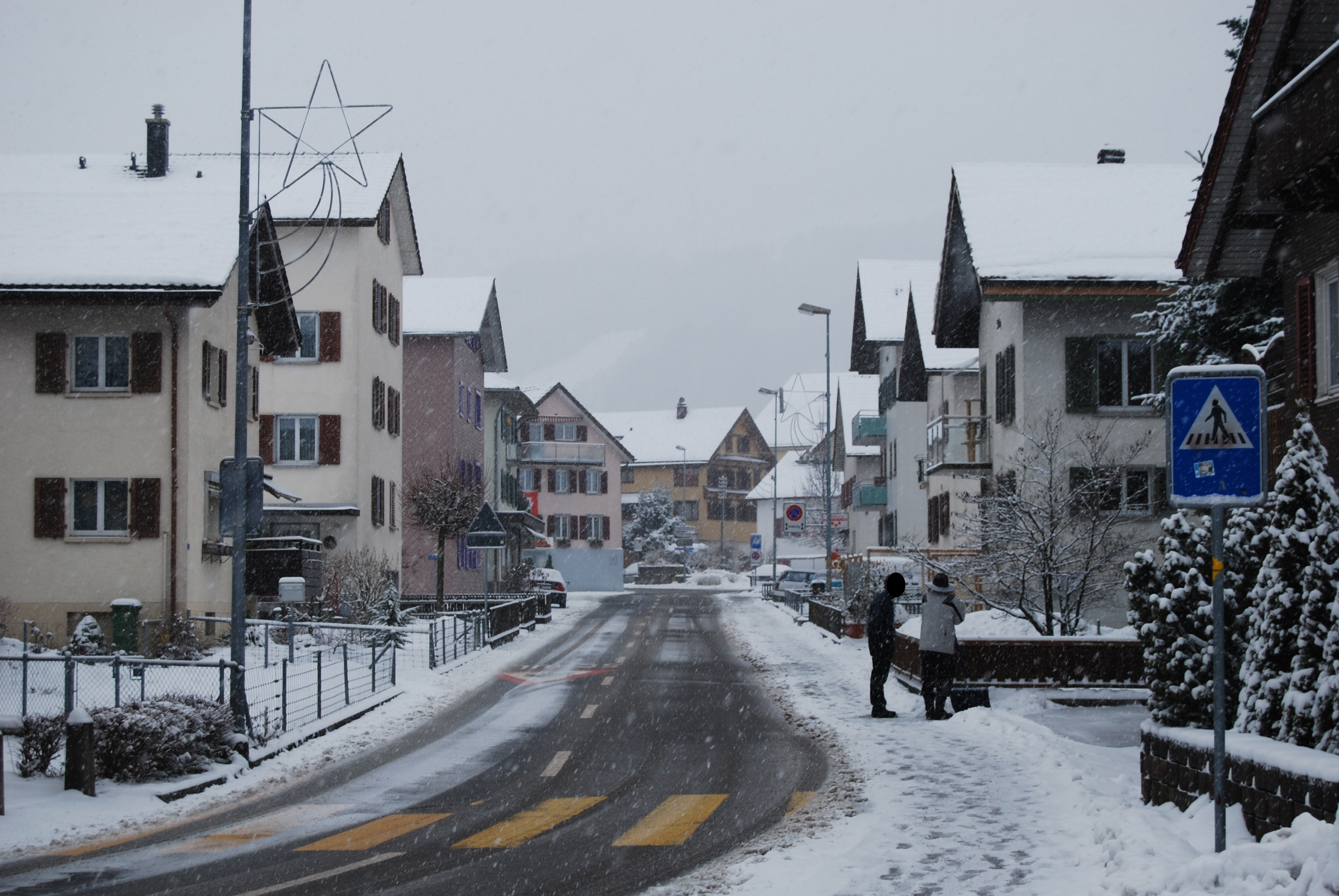

- Flag Coat of arms
- Location of Galgenen
- Location within Switzerland Location within Canton of Schwyz
- Coordinates: 47°11′N 8°53′E
- Country: Switzerland
- Canton: Schwyz
- District: March

Area
  - Total: 13.3 km^{2} (5.1 sq mi)
- Elevation: 425 m (1,394 ft)

Population (December 2020)
  - Total: 5,277
  - Density: 397/km^{2} (1,030/sq mi)
- Time zone: UTC+01:00 (CET)
  - Summer (DST): UTC+02:00 (CEST)
- Postal code: 8854
- SFOS number: 1342
- ISO 3166 code: CH-SZ
- Surrounded by: Altendorf, Lachen, Schübelbach, Vorderthal, Wangen
- Website: www.galgenen.ch

Galgenen is a municipality in March District in the canton of Schwyz in Switzerland.

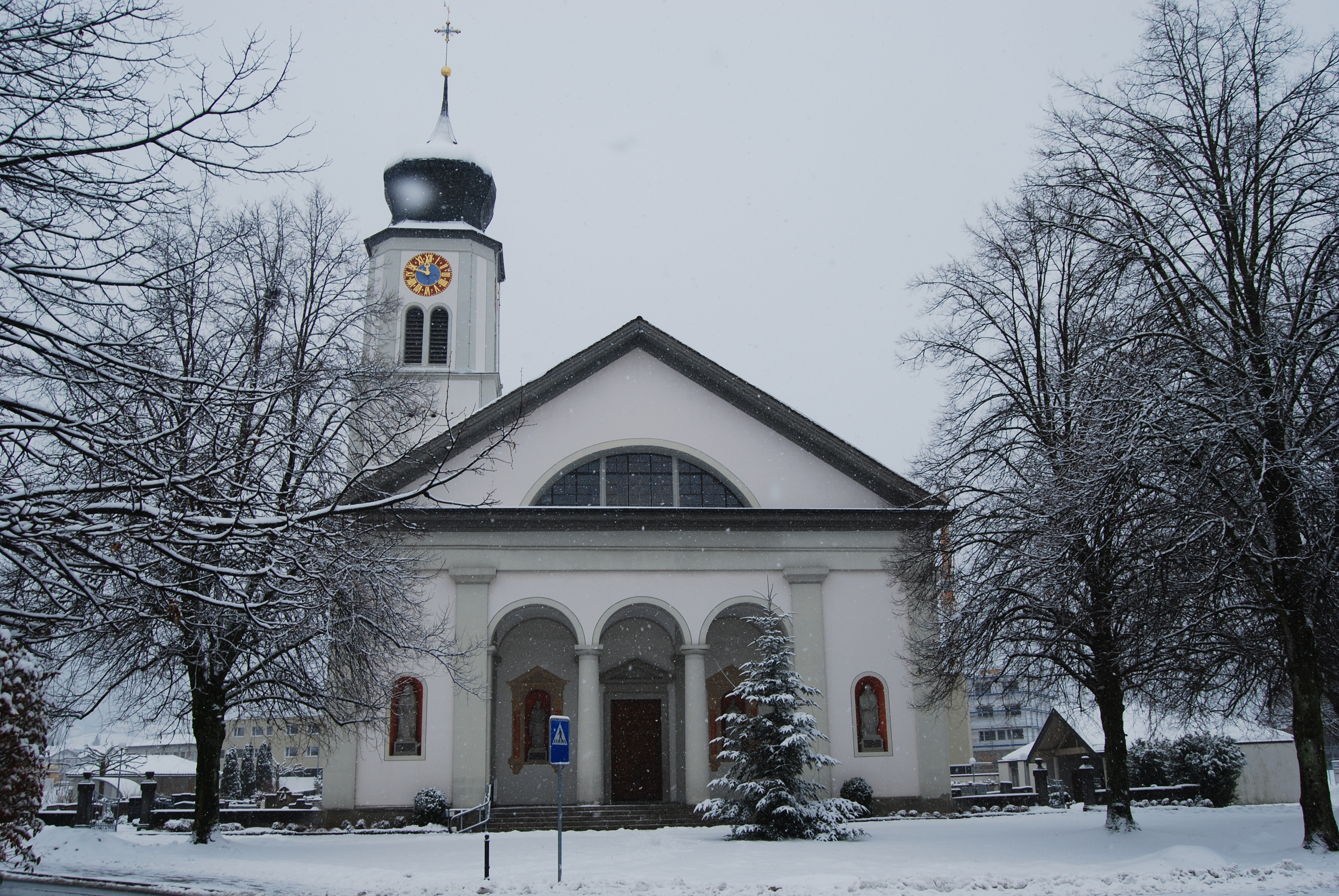
Catholic St. Martin Church at Galgenen

== History ==
Galgenen is first mentioned in 1229 as Galgênne.

== Geography ==
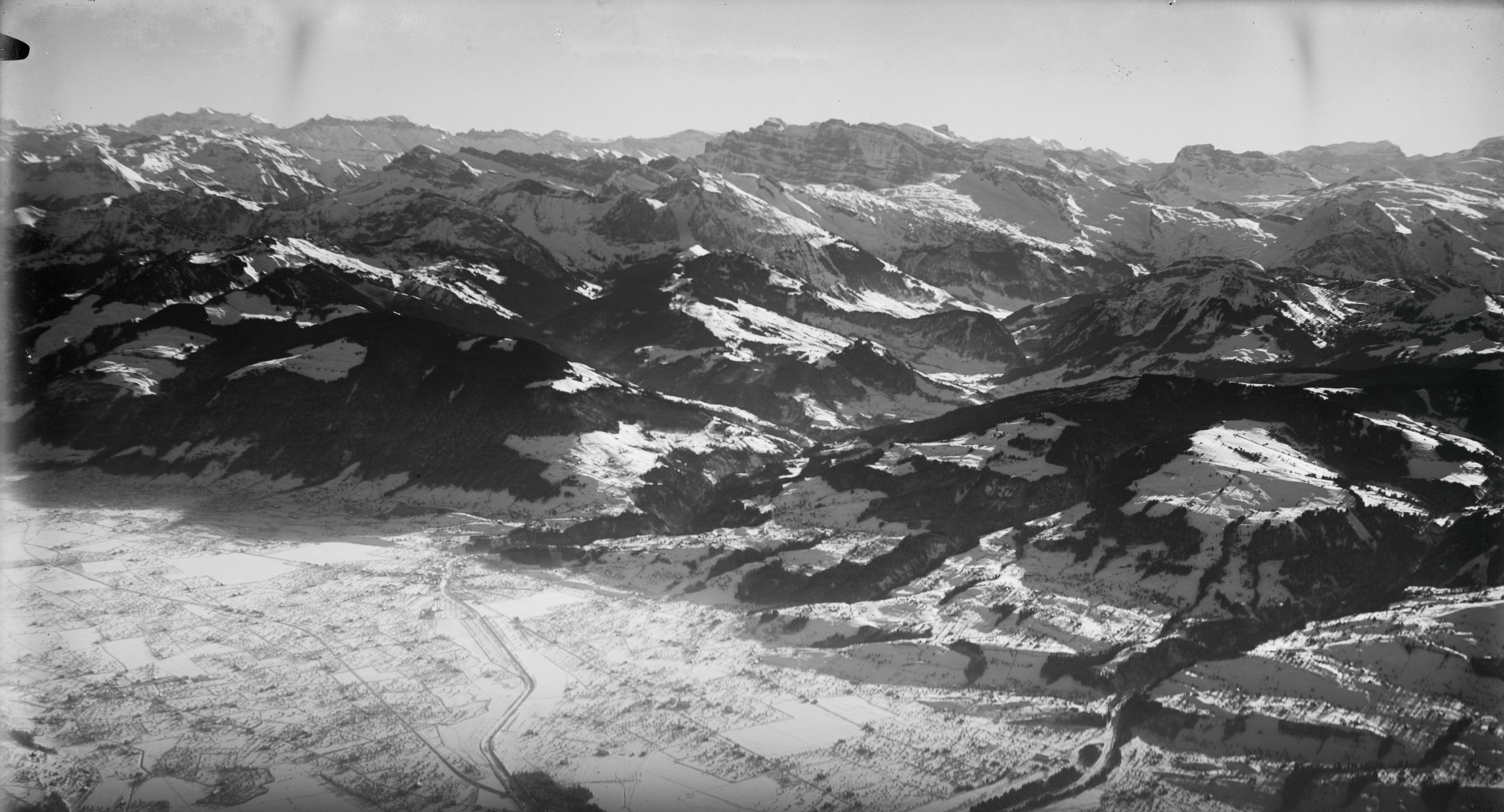
Aerial view by Walter Mittelholzer (1919)

Galgenen has an area, as of 2006, of 13.3 km^{2} (5.1 sq mi). Of this area, 50.8% is used for agricultural purposes, while 39.8% is forested. Of the rest of the land, 9% is settled (buildings or roads) and the remainder (0.4%) is non-productive (rivers, glaciers or mountains).

It consists of the village of Galgenen and village section of Siebnen-Galgenen as well as the hamlets of Achern, Buechli, Stöckli and Steinweid.

== Demographics ==
Galgenen has a population (as of 31 December 2020) of 5,277. As of 2007, 17.4% of the population was made up of foreign nationals. Over the last 10 years the population has grown at a rate of 10.6%. Most of the population (as of 2000) speaks German (90.7%), with Albanian being second most common ( 3.0%) and Serbo-Croatian being third (1.4%).

As of 2000 the gender distribution of the population was 51.3% male and 48.7% female. The age distribution, as of 2008, in Galgenen is; 1,008 people or 25.7% of the population is between 0 and 19. 1,194 people or 30.4% are 20 to 39, and 1,305 people or 33.2% are 40 to 64. The senior population distribution is 261 people or 6.6% are 65 to 74. There are 110 people or 2.8% who are 70 to 79 and 49 people or 1.25% of the population who are over 80.

As of 2000 there are 1,575 households, of which 448 households (or about 28.4%) contain only a single individual. 116 or about 7.4% are large households, with at least five members.

In the 2007 election the most popular party was the SVP which received 52.1% of the vote. The next three most popular parties were the FDP (18.9%), the SPS (12.4%) and the CVP (12.1%).

The entire Swiss population is generally well educated. In Galgenen about 67.4% of the population (between age 25–64) have completed either non-mandatory upper secondary education or additional higher education (either university or a Fachhochschule).

Galgenen has an unemployment rate of 1.59%. As of 2005, there were 183 people employed in the primary economic sector and about 71 businesses involved in this sector. 309 people are employed in the secondary sector and there are 60 businesses in this sector. 475 people are employed in the tertiary sector, with 130 businesses in this sector.

From the 2000 census, 2,680 or 68.2% are Roman Catholic, while 577 or 14.7% belonged to the Swiss Reformed Church. Of the rest of the population, there are less than 5 individuals who belong to the Christian Catholic faith, there are 55 individuals (or about 1.40% of the population) who belong to the Orthodox Church, and there are less than 5 individuals who belong to another Christian church. There are 270 (or about 6.88% of the population) who are Islamic. There are 10 individuals (or about 0.25% of the population) who belong to another church (not listed on the census), 201 (or about 5.12% of the population) belong to no church, are agnostic or atheist, and 129 individuals (or about 3.28% of the population) did not answer the question.

The historical population is given in the following table:

Year	Population
1850	1,343
1900	1,410
1950	2,299
1970	2,539
1980	2,895
1990	3,473
2000	4,042
2005	4,178
2007	4,406
