= List of Swiss main roads =

List of highways

Signal 4.57 "Main road number"

This is a list of the main roads (German: Hauptstrassen, French: routes principales, Italian: strade principali) in Switzerland. Together with the motorways, they are the main long distance roads. Unlike the motorways, they are usually not dual carriageways, and no toll vignette is required.

Drivers on main roads have the right of way. Drivers on all roads not listed below except motorways and expressways (German: Nebenstrassen, French: route secondaires, Italian: strade secondarie) have to give the way.

== Main roads signalized with "Main road number" ==
The main roads 1 to 30 are signalized with the sign 4.57 "Main road number".

Route number	Starting point	Ending point	Length (km)	Length (mi)	Route path
H1	Perly GE	Kreuzlingen TG	343	213	(Saint-Julien-en-Genevois, D 1201), Perly, Genève, Lausanne, Murten, Bern, Lenzburg, Mutschellenpass, Zürich (Bernerstrasse), Winterthur, Wallisellen, Frauenfeld, Kreuzlingen H13
H2	Basel-Burgfelden	Chiasso TI	319	198	Basel, Augst, Liestal, Sissach, Unterer Hauenstein, Olten, Sursee, Luzern, Küssnacht, Arth, Brunnen, Göschenen, Gotthard, Airolo, Bellinzona, Lugano, Chiasso, (Como, Via Bellinzona)
H2a	Dagmersellen LU	Luzern	43	27	H2, Dagmersellen, Willisau, Wolhusen, Kriens, Luzern H2 / H4 / H10
H2b	Küssnacht SZ	Ingenbohl SZ	27	17	H2, Küssnacht, Weggis, Vitznau, Gersau, Brunnen, Ingenbohl H2 / H8
H3	Basel	Castasegna GR	343	213	(Weil am Rhein, B 3), Basel, Frick, Brugg, Baden, Zürich (Berner Strasse), Pfäffikon, Sargans, Chur, Lenzerheide, Tiefencastel, Julierpass, Silvaplana, Malojapass, Castasegna, (Chiavenna, SS 37)
H4	Bargen SH	Meiringen BE	158	98	(Blumberg, B 27), Bargen, Schaffhausen, Bülach, Zürich (Leimbach), Adliswil, Zug, Luzern, Hergiswil, Sarnen, Brünig, Meiringen H6 / H11
H5	Lausanne	Koblenz AG	206	128	H9, Lausanne-Prilly, Yverdon, Neuchâtel, Biel/Bienne, Solothurn, Olten, Aarau, Brugg, Koblenz H7
H6	Boncourt JU	Gletsch VS	251	156	(Belfort, D 19), Boncourt, Porrentruy, Delémont, Moutier, Biel/Bienne, Lyss, Bern, Thun, Spiez, Interlaken, Brienz, Meiringen, Grimselpass, Gletsch H19
H7	Basel	St. Margrethen SG	183	114	(Weil am Rhein, B 3), Basel, Koblenz, Bad Zurzach, Kaiserstuhl, Winterthur, Wil, St. Gallen, Rorschach, St. Margrethen, (Höchst, B 202)
H8	St. Gallen	Ingenbohl SZ	92	57	H7, St. Gallen Winkeln, Herisau, Wattwil, Ricken, Rapperswil, Pfäffikon, Sattel, Schwyz, Ibach, Ingenbohl H2
H9	Vallorbe VD	Gondo VS	233	145	(Pontarlier, N 57), Vallorbe, Lausanne, Vevey, Martigny, Sion, Brig, Simplonpass, Gondo, (Domodossola, SS 33)
H10	Les Verrières NE	Luzern	179	111	(Pontarlier, D 67bis), Les Verrières, Neuchâtel, Kerzers, Bern, Langnau, Wolhusen, Luzern H2 / H4
H11	Vionnaz VD	Wassen UR	201	125	H21, Vionnaz, Aigle, Col des Mosses, Château-d'Œx, Zweisimmen, Spiez, Interlaken, Innertkirchen, Sustenpass, Wassen H2
H12	Vevey VD	Basel	186	116	H9, Vevey, Bulle, Freiburg im Üechtland, Bern, Solothurn, Balsthal, Oberer Hauenstein, Liestal, Basel
H13	Trasadingen SH	Brissago TI	320	200	(Waldshut, B 34), Trasadingen, Schaffhausen, Kreuzlingen, Romanshorn, Rorschach, Buchs, Chur, Thusis, (San-Bernardino-Pass), Bellinzona, Locarno, Brissago, (Verbania, SS 34)
H14	Schleitheim SH	Romanshorn TG	86	53	(Stühlingen, B 314), Schleitheim, Schaffhausen, Frauenfeld, Weinfelden, Sulgen, Amriswil, Romanshorn H13
H15	Thayngen SH	Rapperswil SG	90	56	(Gottmadingen, B 34), Thayngen, Schaffhausen, Winterthur, Turbenthal, Wald, Rapperswil H8 / H17
H16	Tägerwilen TG	Buchs SG	105	65	(Konstanz, B 33), Tägerwilen, Märstetten, Wil, Wattwil, Wildhaus, Buchs, (Schaan FL, H16)
H17	Leibstadt AG	Altdorf	178	111	H7, Leibstadt, Dielsdorf, Zürich, Rapperswil, Uznach, Glarus, Linthal, Klausenpass, Altdorf H2
H18	La Chaux-de-Fonds NE	Birsfelden BL	96	60	H20, La Chaux-de-Fonds, Saignelégier, Delémont, Laufen, ( A 2 / A 3, Birsfelden-Hagnau)
H19	Brig VS	Reichenau GR	163	101	H9, Brig, Gletsch, Furkapass, Andermatt, Oberalppass, Disentis/Mustér, Flims, Reichenau H13
H20	Le Locle NE	Neuchâtel	29	18	(Morteau, D 461), Le Locle, La Chaux-de-Fonds, Neuchâtel H10
H21	Saint-Gingolph VS	Great St Bernard Tunnel	86	53	(Évian-les-Bains, N 5 / D 1005), Saint-Gingolph, Monthey, Bex, Martigny, Orsières, Great St Bernard Tunnel, (Aosta, SS 27)
H22	Murten FR	Herzogenbuchsee BE	68	42	H1, Murten, Lyss, Solothurn, Wangen an der Aare, Herzogenbuchsee H1
H23	Kirchberg BE	Aarau	94	58	H1, Kirchberg, Burgdorf, Sumiswald, Huttwil, Sursee, Beromünster, Reinach, Suhr, Aarau H5 / H24
H24	Sursee LU	Frick AG	43	27	H23, Sursee, Schöftland, Aarau, Staffelegg, Frick H3
H25	Lenzburg AG	Arth SZ	57	35	( A 1) Lenzburg, Sins, Zug ZG, Arth H2
H26	Wildegg AG	Emmenbrücke LU	45	28	H5, Wildegg, Lenzburg, Beinwil am See, Hochdorf, Eschenbach, Emmenbrücke H2
H27	Silvaplana GR	Vinadi GR	89	55	H3, Silvaplana, St. Moritz, Samedan, Scuol, Martina, Vinadi, (Pfunds, B 184)
H28	Landquart GR	Müstair GR	114	71	(Vaduz FL, H28), Landquart, Davos, Flüelapass, Susch, Zernez, Ofenpass, Müstair, (Schluderns, SS 41)
H29	Samedan GR	Campocologno GR	51	32	H27, Samedan, Pontresina, Berninapass, Poschiavo, Campocologno, (Tirano, SS 38dir-A)
H30	La Cibourg BE	Balsthal SO	74	46	H18, La Cibourg, Sonceboz, Moutier, Balsthal H12

== Main roads not signalized ==
The main roads 100 and upwards are not signalized with the sign 4.57 "Main road number".

=== Common main roads ===
Route number	Starting point	Ending point	Length (km)	Length (mi)	Route path
H101	Genève	Meyrin GE			Genève, Meyrin, (Saint-Genis-Pouilly)
H102	Genève	Moillesulaz GE			Genève, Moillesulaz, (Annemasse)
H103	Genève	Chancy GE			Genève, Chancy, (Bellegarde-sur-Valserine)
H104	Plan-les-Ouates GE	Cointrin GE			Plan-les-Ouates, (Pont, Butin), Cointrin
H105	Genève	Anières GE			Genève, Vésenaz, Anières (border), D 1005
H106	Genève	Le Grand-Saconnex GE			Genève, Le Grand-Saconnex, (Ferney-Voltaire), D1005
H107	Le Bouchet GE	Meyrin GE			Le Bouchet, Cointrin (Flughafen), Meyrin (Route de Pré-Bois)
H109	Genève	Satigny GE			Genève, Route du Nant d'Avril (Vernier, Meyrin, Satigny, H110)
H110	Meyrin GE	Dardagny GE			Route du Mandement (Meyrin, H109, Satigny, Le Moulin, Dardagny), (Saint-Jean-de-Gonville)
H111	Genève	Chêne-Bourg GE			Genève (Malagnou), Sous-Moulin, Chêne-Bourg
H112	Genève	Veyrier GE			Genève, Veyrier
H112.1	Genève				Genève (Route du Val d'Arve, connection road Route de Saint-Julien, Route de Malagnou)
H113	Vésenaz GE	Hermance GE			Vésenaz, Hermance
H114	Carouge GE	Croix-de-Rozon GE			Carouge, Croix-de-Rozon
H115	Thônex GE	Monniaz GE			Thônex, Puplinge, Jussy, Monniaz (border)
H116	Genève	Vandœuvres GE			Genève, Vandœuvres
H121	Mies VD	Coppet VD			H1, Mies, Commugny, A 1 Coppet, (Divonne-les-Bains)
H122	Nyon VD	Crassier VD			Nyon, Crassier - (Divonne-les-Bains D 984C)
H123	Nyon VD	La Cure VD			Nyon, Saint-Cergue, La Cure, (Morez)
H124	Nyon VD	Cheseaux-sur-Lausanne VD			Nyon, Bursins, Aubonne, Bussy, Cottens, Cossonay, Penthalaz, Sullens, Cheseaux-sur-Lausanne
H125	Gland VD	Saint-Cergue VD			H1, Gland, Begnins, Arzier, Saint-Cergue
H126	Aubonne VD	Aubonne VD			Aubonne, H1
H126.1	Allaman VD	Aubonne VD			Allaman, A 1 Aubonne, H126
H127	Rolle VD				Rolle ( H1, A 1, H124)
H128	Morges VD	Bière VD			Morges, Lully, Bussy, Apples, Ballens, Bière
H129	Morges VD	Le Pont VD			Morges, Cossonay, L'Isle, Col du Mollendruz, Le Pont
H130	Yverdon-les-Bains VD	Le Pont VD			Yverdon-les-Bains, Orbe, Croy, Vaulion, Pétra, Félix, Mont du Lac, L'Abbaye, Le Brassus, Le Lieu, Le Pont
H130.1	Le Pont VD	L'Abbaye VD			Le Pont, L'Abbaye
H131	Le Brassus VD	Le Pont VD			Le Brassus, Le Lieu, Le Pont
H132	Le Creux VD	Chavornay VD			Le Creux H9, Ballaigues, Orbe, Chavornay, A 1
H133	Bossaye VD	Oulens-sous-Echallens VD			Bossaye H130, Orbe (Granges Saint-Martin), Orny, La Sarraz, Eclépens, Oulens-sous-Echallens
H134	Lausanne	Chavornay VD			Lausanne (Blécherette), Cheseaux-sur-Lausanne, Oulens-sous-Echallens, Chavornay
H135	Préverenges VD	Cheseaux-sur-Lausanne VD			Préverenges, Denges, Crissier, Cheseaux-sur-Lausanne
H136	Saint-Sulpice VD	Renens VD			Saint-Sulpice H1, Renens
H137	Lausanne	Aclens VD			Lausanne (Galicien), Renens, Croix-de-Plan, Aclens
H138	Lutry VD	Ecublens VD			Lutry, Pully (Hafen), Lausanne (Cour), Lausanne (Bourdonnette), Chavannes-près-Renens, Ecublens
H139	Prilly VD	Le Mont-sur-Lausanne VD			Prilly H5, A 9 Lausanne, Blécherette, Le Mont-sur-Lausanne
H139.1	Lausanne				Lausanne (Stadt, A 9, Blécherette)
H140	Les Gonelles VD	Syens VD			Les Gonelles H9, Chexbres, Forel (Lavaux), Carrouge, Syens H1
H141	Lausanne	Forel (Lavaux) VD			Lausanne (La Sallaz), Savigny, Forel (Lavaux)
H142	Le Sépey VD	Saanen BE			Le Sépey H11, Col du Pillon, Gstaad, Saanen
H143	Les Moulins VD				Les Moulins, H11 (in Richtung Col des Mosses)
H144	Noville VD	Chessel VS			H9, Noville, Chessel, H21
H145	Collombey VS	Saint-Triphon VD			Collombey, Saint-Triphon, H9
H146	Massongex VS	Saint-Maurice VS			Massongex, Saint-Maurice
H147	Ollon VD	Barboleusaz VD			H9, Ollon, Villars-sur-Ollon, Barboleusaz (Gryon)
H149	Sainte-Croix VD	Col des Roches NE	39	24	Sainte-Croix, Fleurier H10, La Brévine, Le Cerneux, Péquignot, Col des Roches H20
H150	Lausanne	Estavayer-le-Lac FR	45	28	Lausanne, Le Mont-sur-Lausanne, Bottens, Possens, Thierrens, Combremont-le-Petit, Combremont-le-Grand, Vesin, Estavayer-le-Lac
H151	L'Auberson VD	Châtel-Saint-Denis FR	74	46	(Pontarlier), L'Auberson, Col des Etroits, Sainte-Croix, Yverdon-les-Bains H5, Thierrens, Moudon H1, Oron-la-Ville, Châtel-Saint-Denis H12, A 12
H151.1	Montet (Glâne) FR	Romont FR	13	8.1	Montet (Glâne) H151, Ursy, Romont
H152	Yverdon-les-Bains VD	Avenches	41	25	Yverdon-les-Bains, Yvonand, Estavayer-le-Lac, Saint-Aubin, Villars-le-Grand, Salavaux, H1 near Avenches
H153	Avenches VD	Gampelen BE	21	13	H1, A 1 Avenches, Villars-le-Grand, Chabrey, Cudrefin, Gampelen
H154	Essertes VD	Vaulruz FR	18	11	Essertes, Oron-la-Ville, Oron-le-Châtel, Fiaugères, H12 (Nähe Autobahnausfahrt A 12 Vaulruz)
H155	Oron-le-Châtel VD	Fribourg	37	23	Oron-le-Châtel, Bouloz, Romont, Chénens, Matran A 12, Fribourg H12
H156	Lucens VD	Vaulruz FR	19	12	H1 Lucens, Romont, Vaulruz
H157	Payerne VD	Fribourg	18	11	Payerne H1, Grolley, H157.1, Belfaux, Fribourg H12
H157.1	Avenches VD	Misery FR	7	4.3	H1 Avenches, Misery, H157
H168	La Chaux-de-Fonds NE	Doubs NE	12	7.5	H18 La Chaux-de-Fonds, vor Abzweigung Biaufond an der Doubs, (Maîche D 464)
H169	Le Locle NE	Les Brenets NE	6	3.7	H20 Le Locle, Les Brenets
H170	Corcelles-Cormondrèche NE	Le Locle NE	25	16	H10 Corcelles-Cormondrèche, La Tourne, Les Petits Ponts H171, Les Ponts-de-Martel, Le Locle H20
H171	Travers NE	Les Petits Ponts NE	7	4.3	Travers H10, Les Petits Ponts H170
H172	Saint-Blaise NE	Neuchâtel	6	3.7	Saint-Blaise, Hauterive, La Coudre, Neuchâtel H5 / H10
H173	Les Grattes NE	Colombier NE	7	4.3	Les Grattes, Rochefort H10, Bôle, Colombier, H5/ A 5 (Areuse)
H174	Auvernier NE	Peseux NE	3	1.9	A 5 (Auvernier), H5, Auvernier, H10 Peseux
H177	Murten FR	Schwarzsee FR	40	25	Murten H1, Salvenach, Düdingen, H12, Tafers, Plaffeien H178, Schwarzsee
H178	Fribourg	Plaffeien FR	21	13	H12 Fribourg, Giffers, Plasselb, Plaffeien H177
H178.1	Römerswil FR	Tafers FR	4	2.5	Römerswil, St. Ursen, Tafers
H179	Chastels FR	Laupen BE	11	6.8	H12 Chastels (Kastels), Düdingen, Laupen
H180	Fribourg	Broc FR	25	16	H12 Fribourg, Marly, La Roche, Botterens, H189 Broc
H180.1	Bürglen FR	Tentlingen FR	5	3.1	Bürglen, Marly, Tentlingen
H181	Estavayer-le-Lac FR	Fribourg	27	17	Estavayer-le-Lac, Bussy, A 1 Payerne, Bypass Payerne H1, Prez-vers-Noréaz, Fribourg H12
H181.1	Avry-sur-Matran FR	Matran FR	2	1.2	Avry-sur-Matran H181, A 12 Matran
H182	Fribourg	Ins BE	26	16	Fribourg, Courtepin, Murten (Ryfstrasse), Muntelier, Sugiez (Le Péage), Ins H10
H183	Fribourg	Riggisberg BE	32	20	Fribourg H12, Tafers, Heitenried, Schwarzenburg, Riggisberg, H221 (near Kirchenthurnen or Rümligen)
H186	Vesin FR		1	0.62	Vesin (Route de Cugy, Pot de fer, H181)
H189	Bulle FR	Jaun FR	22	14	Bulle, Broc, Jaun H505
H190	Bulle FR	Château-d'Œx VD	25	16	Bulle, Epagny, Montbovon, H11 Château-d'Œx
H191	Broc FR	Epagny FR	2	1.2	Broc, Epagny
H192	Riaz FR	Corbières FR	4	2.5	H12 Riaz, Corbières
H193	Bossonnens FR	Jongny FR	5	3.1	Bossonnens, Jongny H12
H201	Monthey VS	Pas de Morgins VS			Monthey, Pas de Morgins, (Abondance)
H202	Troistorrents VS	Champéry VS			Troistorrents, Champéry
H203	Martigny VS	Le Châtelard VS			Martigny-Ville, Martigny-Bourg, Col de la Forclaz, Le Châtelard, (Chamonix-Mont-Blanc)
H204	Ravoire VS				H203, Ravoire
H205	Sembrancher VS	Verbier VS			Sembrancher, Le Châble, Verbier
H206	Sion	Les Haudères VS			Sion, Vex, Les Haudères
H207	Sion	Haute-Nendaz VS			Sion, Haute-Nendaz
H208	Sierre VS	Crans-sur-Sierre VS			Sierre, Montana, Crans-sur-Sierre
H209	Montana VS	Vermala VS			Montana, Vermala
H210	Sierre VS	Crans-sur-Sierre VS			Sierre, Corin, Chermignon, Crans-sur-Sierre
H210.1	Sierre VS	Zinal VS			Sierre, Vissoie, Ayer, Zinal
H211	Susten VS	Leukerbad VS			Susten, Leuk, Leukerbad
H212	Visp VS	Saas-Fee VS			Visp, Stalden, Saas-Grund, Saas-Fee
H212.1	Saas-Grund VS	Mattmarksee VS			Saas-Grund, Saas-Almagell, Mattmarksee
H213	Stalden VS	Täsch VS			Stalden, Täsch
H214	Naters VS	Mund VS			Naters, Mund
H215	Naters VS	Blatten bei Naters VS			Naters, Blatten bei Naters
H216	Fiesch VS	Fieschertal VS			Fiesch, Fieschertal
H219	Reidenbach BE	Jaunpass BE	11	6.8	H11 Reidenbach, Jaunpass, Cantonal border BE/FR H505
H220	Zweisimmen BE	Lenk im Simmental BE			Zweisimmen, Lenk
H221	Bern	Grindelwald BE	72	45	H1 Bern, Belp, Thun H6 / H8, Gunten, Interlaken H6 / H8 / H11, Grindelwald
H221.1	Thun BE				Thun (H221, A 6, Nord, H6)
H221.2	Belp BE	Metzgerhüsi BE			Belp, Rubigen, Worb, Enggistein, Metzgerhüsi
H222	Zweilütschinen BE	Stechelberg BE			Zweilütschinen, Lauterbrunnen, Stechelberg
H223	Spiez BE	Kandersteg BE	27	17	Spiez H6 / H11, Frutigen, Kandersteg
H223.1	Frutigen BE	Adelboden BE	13	8.1	Frutigen, Adelboden
H226	Brünigpass BE	Meiringen BE			Brünigpass, Meiringen, H6
H227	Gwatt BE	Wimmis/Erlenbach BE			Gwatt, H11 (between Wimmis and Erlenbach)
H228	Münsingen BE	Zäziwil BE			Münsingen, Konolfingen, Zäziwil
H229	Kiesen BE	Kleindietwil BE			Kiesen, Konolfingen, Grosshöchstetten, Biglen, Walkringen, Schafhausen, Rüegsbach, Affoltern im Emmental, Häusernmoos, Ursenbach, H244 Kleindietwil
H229.1	Ursenbach BE	Walterswil BE			Ursenbach, Walterswil BE, H23
H229.2	Affoltern im Emmental BE	Weier im Emmental BE			Affoltern im Emmental, Weier im Emmental
H229.3	Oberdiessbach BE	Schüpbach BE			Oberdiessbach, Linden, Röthenbach im Emmental, Eggiwil, Schüpbach
229.4	Thun BE	Wiggen LU			Thun, Steffisburg, Oberei, Schallenberg, Schangnau, Marbach, Wiggen (Egghus)
H229.5	Kreuzweg BE	Jassbach BE			Kreuzweg, Heimenschwand, Jassbach
H229.6	Oberei BE	Röthenbach im Emmental BE			Oberei, Röthenbach im Emmental
H229.7	Siehenstrasse				Connection road between H229.3 and Schallenbergstrasse
H229.8	Schangnau BE	Kemmeriboden BE			Schangnau, Kemmeriboden
H230.1	Riggisberg BE	Gurnigel BE			Riggisberg, Rüti bei Riggisberg, Gurnigel
H231	Wattenwil BE	Burgistein Station BE			Wattenwil, Burgistein Station
H232	Bern	Riffenmatt BE			Bern, Schwarzenburg, Milken, Riffenmatt
H232.1	Schwarzenburg BE	Riffenmatt BE			Schwarzenburg, Riedstätt, Kalchstätten, Guggisberg, Riffenmatt
H233	Laupen BE	Neuenegg BE			Laupen, Neuenegg, H12
H233.1	Neuenegg BE	Lanzenhäusern BE	9	5.6	Neuenegg, Flamatt, Albligen, Lanzenhäusern
H234	Bern	Worb BE			Bern, Deisswil bei Münchenbuchsee, Boll, Worb
H234.1	Bern				Bern (Papiermühlestrasse)
H234.2	Bern				Bern (Worblentalstrasse)
H234.3	Bern	Hueb BE			Bern (Bolligenstrasse from Schermenweg), Bolligen, Hueb, H234.5
H234.4	Bern				Bern (H234, Röhrswylstrasse, H234.3)
H234.5	Boll BE	Oberburg BE			Boll, Lindenthal, Krauchthal, Oberburg
H235	Nidau BE	Bern			H6 Nidau, Bellmund, Aarberg H22, Frieswil, Bern-Bethlehem H1/ H10
H235.1	Biel/Bienne BE	Lengnau BE			Biel/Bienne, Mett, Orpund, Meinisberg, Lengnau
H235.2	Frinvillier/Rondchâtel BE				Connection road for H6 in Frinvillier and Rondchâtel
H235.3	Studen BE	Büetigen BE			Studen, Büetigen
H235.4	Innerberg BE	Oberzollikofen BE			Innerberg, Säriswil, Uettligen, Ortschwaben, Kirchlindach, Oberzollikofen
H235.5	Wohlen bei Bern BE	Uettligen BE			Wohlen bei Bern, Uettligen
H235.6	Uettligen BE	Halenbrücke BE			Uettligen, Halenbrücke
H236	Aarberg BE	Bern			H22 Aarberg, Frienisberg, Ortschwaben, Bern
H237	Ins BE	Aarberg BE			Ins, Treiten, Siselen, Aarberg
H237.1	Ins BE	Nidau BE			Ins, Brüttelen, Täuffelen, Nidau
H237.2	Le Landeron NE	Lüscherz BE	11	6.8	H5 Le Landeron, St. Johannsen, Erlach, Vinelz, Lüscherz, H237.1
H237.3	Zihlbrücke BE	Gals BE	3	1.9	Zihlbrücke BE, Gals, H237.2 (near Neuhaus)
H238	Schönbrunnen BE	Urtenen-Schönbühl BE			Schönbrunnen, Urtenen-Schönbühl
H239.1	Langenthal BE	Gondiswil BE			Langenthal, Melchnau, Gondiswil, H23
H240	Burgdorf BE	Langenthal BE			Burgdorf, Wynigen, Langenthal
H241	Langenthal BE	Kaltenherberge BE			Langenthal, Kaltenherberge
H242	Bätterkinden BE	Kirchberg BE			Bätterkinden, Kirchberg
H243	Ramsei BE	Langnau im Emmental BE			Ramsei, Langnau im Emmental
H243.1	Grünenmatt BE	Grünen BE			Grünenmatt, Trachselwald, Grünen
H243.2	Grünen BE	Wasen im Emmental BE			Grünen, Sumiswald, Wasen im Emmental
H244	Niederbipp BE	Huttwil BE			Niederbipp, Aarwangen, Langenthal, Kleindietwil, Huttwil
H244.1	Huttwil BE	Wyssachen BE			Huttwil, Wyssachen
H244.2	Huttwil BE	Eriswil BE			Huttwil, Eriswil
H245	Hindelbank BE	Heimiswil BE			Hindelbank, Burgdorf, Heimiswil
H245.1	Fraubrunnen BE	Kernenried BE			Fraubrunnen, Kernenried, H1
H245.2	Krauchthal BE	Hindelbank BE			Krauchthal, Hindelbank
H245.3	Burgdorf BE				Burgdorf (H234.5, Pleerstrasse, H245)
H246	Fahy	Courtedoux JU	7	4.3	(Abbévillers D 34), Fahy, Courtedoux
H246.1	Grandgourt JU	Beurnevésin JU	9	5.6	H6 Grandgourt, Lugnez, Beurnevésin
H247	Damvant JU	Lucelle JU	31	19	(Pont-de-Roide-Vermondans D 73), Damvant, Porrentruy H6, Alle, H247.1, H247.3, Charmoille, ( D 432 near Lucelle)
H247.1	Alle JU	Beurnevésin JU	10	6.2	H247 near Alle, Bonfol, Beurnevésin, (Pfetterhouse D 10B)
H247.2	Miécourt JU		2	1.2	Miécourt, (Courtavon D 473)
H247.3	Cornol JU	Charmoille JU	4	2.5	H6 Cornol, Fregiécourt, H247 near Charmoille
H247.4	Bure JU	Porrentruy JU	7	4.3	Bure, Porrentruy H6
H248	Goumois JU	Tavannes BE	26	16	( D 437A Goumois), Goumois JU, Saignelégier H18, H248.1, Tramelan, Tavannes H6 / H30
H248.1	La Ferrière BE	Tramelan JU	18	11	H18 La Ferrière H18, Les Breuleux, Mont-Tramelan H248.2, H248 near Tramelan
H248.2	Saint-Imier BE	Mont-Tramelan BE	8	5.0	H30 Saint-Imier, Mont Crosin, Mont-Tramelan H248.1
H248.3	Les Emibois JU	Les Breuleux JU	4	2.5	H18 Les Emibois, Les Breuleux H248
H248.4	Tavannes BE	Bassecourt JU	20	12	H6 near Tavannes BE, Bellelay, Gorges du Pichoux, Undervelier, H18 near Bassecourt
H249	La Motte JU	Glovelier JU	24	15	(Gléré D 437), La Motte, Saint-Ursanne, A 16, Les Malettes H6, Col des Rangiers, La Caquerelle H249.1, Boécourt, A 16, Glovelier H18
H249.1	La Caquerelle JU	La Roche JU	10	6.2	H249 La Caquerelle, La Roche H18
H250	Lucelle JU	Develier JU	13	8.1	Lucelle, Bourrignon, Develier H6
H250.1	Neumühle BL	Soyhières JU	12	7.5	Neumühle, Movelier, Soyhières H18
H250.2	Delémont	Mervelier JU	12	7.5	H6 Delémont, Vicques, Mervelier
H251	Seedorf BE	St. Niklaus SO			Seedorf, Wiler bei Seedorf, Suberg, Wengi, Messen, Limpach, Bätterkinden, Koppigen, St. Niklaus
H251.1	Lyss BE	Wiler bei Seedorf BE			Lyss, Wiler bei Seedorf
H252	Schönbrunnen BE	Pieterlen BE			Schönbrunnen, Rapperswil, Schnottwil, Büren an der Aare, Meinisbergkreuzung, Pieterlen
H252.1	Schnottwil SO	Lohn SO			Schnottwil, Hessigkofen, Lüterkofen, Lohn
H252.2	Grenchen SO	Arch BE			Grenchen, Arch
H253	Zwingen BL	Breitenbach SO			Zwingen, Brislach, Breitenbach
H254	Koppigen BE	Riedholz SO			Koppigen, Recherswil, Derendingen, Riedholz
H255	Langenthal BE	Zofingen AG			Langenthal, H256 near St. Urban, Vordemwald, Strengelbach, Zofingen
H256	Roggwil BE	Zell LU			H1, Roggwil, St. Urban, Altbüron, Grossdietwil, Fischbach, Zell
H256.1	Melchnau BE	Altbüron LU			Melchnau, Altbüron
H265	Olten SO	Schönenwerd SO			Olten, Winznau, Niedergösgen, Schönenwerd
H266	Niedergösgen SO	Aarau			Niedergösgen, Erlinsbach SO, Erlinsbach AG, Aarau
H266.1	Wöschnau SO	Aarau			Wöschnau, Schachen, Aarau (North bypass)
H267	Kleinlützel SO	Balsthal BE			Landesgrenze, Kleinlützel, Laufen, Breitenbach, Büsserach, Passwang, Mümliswil, Balsthal
H268	Oensingen SO	Murgenthal AG			Oensingen, Kestenholz, Murgenthal
H268.1	Kestenholz SO	Wangen bei Olten SO			Kestenholz, Neuendorf, Kappel, Wangen bei Olten
H269	Solothurn	Oberönz BE			Solothurn, Derendingen, Oberönz
H270	Biberist SO	Koppigen BE			Biberist, Gerlafingen, Koppigen
H271	Gerlafingen SO	Kriegstetten SO			Gerlafingen, Kriegstetten
H272	Breitenbach SO	Bad Bubendorf BL			Breitenbach, Reigoldswil, Bad Bubendorf
H273	Flüh SO	Basel			(Leymen), Flüh, Bättwil, Aesch, Dornachbrugg, Münchenstein (Schwertrain), Basel
H274	Röschenz BL	Binningen BL			Röschenz, Challpass, Metzerlen-Mariastein, Flüh, Bättwil, Biel-Benken, Oberwil, Binningen
H275	Rheinfelden AG	Möhlin AG			A 3, Rheinfelden, Riburg, Möhlin
H276	Kienberg SO	Frick AG			Kienberg, Wittnau, Frick
H277	Etzgen AG	Stilli AG			Etzgen, Bürensteig, Stilli
H278	Baden AG	Neuenhof AG			Baden, Wettingen, Neuenhof
H280.1	Birr AG	Lupfig AG			H280, Birr, Lupfig, H280, H296
H280.2	Dintikon AG	Dottikon AG			Dintikon (Langelen), Dottikon
H281	Fislisbach AG	Busslingen AG			Fislisbach, Busslingen, H1 (östlich Bremgarten)
H282	Fislisbach AG	Mutschellen/Berikon AG			Fislisbach, Oberrohrdorf, Remetschwil, Bellikon, Widen, H1 Berikon (Mutschellen)
H283	Rothrist AG	Aarburg AG			Rothrist, Aarburg
H284	Zofingen AG	Oftringen AG			H2 (nördlich Zofingen), H1 (östlich Oftringen)
H285	Kölliken AG	Unterkulm AG			Kölliken (Bahnübergang südlich), Holziken, Schöftland, Böhler-Passhöchi, Unterkulm
H285.1	Kölliken AG	Muhen AG			Kölliken, Muhen
H285.2	Kölliken AG	Holziken AG			Kölliken, Holziken
H286	Schöftland AG	Unterentfelden AG			Schöftland, Muhen, Oberentfelden, Unterentfelden (Distelberg)
H286.1	Schöftland AG				Schöftland (Zentrum, Süd)
H287	Schöftland AG	Kirchleerau AG			Schöftland, Wittwil, Staffelbach, Kirchleerau
H288	Rupperswil AG	Seon AG			Rupperswil, Schafisheim (Schoren), Seon
H288.1	Rupperswil AG	Schafisheim AG			H1 Rupperswil, Schafisheim H289
H289	Hunzenschwil AG	Möriken-Wildegg AG			Hunzenschwil, Möriken-Wildegg
H290	Reinach AG	Beinwil am See AG			Reinach, Beinwil am See
H291	Boniswil AG	Meisterschwanden AG			Boniswil, Meisterschwanden
H292	Meisterschwanden AG	Fahrwangen AG			Meisterschwanden, Fahrwangen
H293	Villmergen AG	Wohlen AG			Villmergen, Wohlen (Bullenberg)
H294	Eiken AG	Hardwald AG			Eiken, Hardwald, H7 (west of Laufenburg)
H294.1	Eiken AG	Sisseln AG			Eiken, Sisseln
H295	Siggenthal AG	Zürich			Siggenthal (Station), Ennetbaden, Wettingen, Würenlos, Weiningen, Zürich (Höngg)
H295.1	Siggenthal AG	Bad Zurzach AG			Siggenthal (Station), Würenlingen, Tegerfelden, Bad Zurzach
H295.2	Würenlingen AG	Endingen AG			Würenlingen, Endingen
H295.3	Zürich	Regensdorf ZH			Zürich (Frankental), Grünwald, Regensdorf H17
H295.4	Zurzach AG				Bad Zurzach (Rheinbrücke H7), (Rheinheim)
H296.1	Untersiggenthal AG	Dättwil AG			Untersiggenthal, Turgi, Gebenstorf, Birmenstorf, Dättwil
H297	Wettingen AG	Adlikon bei Regensdorf ZH			Wettingen, Otelfingen, Adlikon bei Regensdorf
H298	Villmergen AG	Gelfingen LU			H1 nördlich Villmergen beim Holzbach, Villmergen, Fahrwangen, Gelfingen
H299	Muri AG	Hedingen ZH			Muri, Birri, Ottenbach, Zwillikon, Hedingen
H305	Bottmingen BL	Birsfelden BL			Bottmingen, Münchenstein, Muttenz, Birsfelden
H306	Pratteln BL	Schweizerhalle BL			Pratteln, Schweizerhalle
H307	Sissach BL	Eptingen BL			Sissach, Zunzgen, Diegten, Eptingen
H308	Pratteln BL	Augst BL			Pratteln (Hülften), Augst
H308.1	Liestal	Arisdorf BL			Liestal, Arisdorf
H309	Sissach BL	Kienberg SO			Sissach, Gelterkinden, Ormalingen, Rothenfluh, Anwil, Kienberg
H310	Biel-Benken BL	Dornach SO			Biel-Benken, Reinach, Dornachbrugg, Dornach
H311	Therwil BL	Basel			Therwil, Binningen, Basel
H312	Allschwil BL	Basel			(Hégenheim), Allschwil, Basel
H313	Ettingen BL	Oberwil BL			Ettingen, Therwil, Oberwil
H314	Reinach BL	Arlesheim BL			Reinach, Arlesheim
H317	Basel				Basel, (Grenzach-Wyhlen B 34)
H318	Basel	Riehen BS			Basel, Riehen, (Lörrach)
H319	Basel				Basel, (Weil am Rhein, B 3)
H320	Basel				Basel, (Huningue)
H322	Riehen BS	Bettingen BS			Riehen, Bettingen
H323	Riehen BS	Riehen BS			Riehen, (Inzlingen)
H324	Riehen BS	Riehen BS			Riehen, (Weil am Rhein)
H329	Schaffhausen SH	Ramsen SH	20	12	H13 / H14 / H15 Schaffhausen, (Büsingen am Hochrhein L202), Laag, (Gailingen am Hochrhein L202, K6151), Ramsen
H329.1	Ratihart TG	Bleichi TG	4	2.5	Ratihart H13, Diessenhofen, Bleichi, H13
H330	Stein am Rhein SH		2	1.2	Stein am Rhein, (Öhningen L192)
H331	Thayngen SH	Hofen SH	6	3.7	A 4 Thayngen, Hofen, (Beuren am Ried L188)
H332	Moskau SH	Heimshofen SH	6	3.7	(Singen L191), Moskau, Ramsen, Hemishofen (Rheinbrücke), H13
H332.1	Hemishofen SH	Stein am Rhein SH	2	1.2	Hemishofen, Stein am Rhein
H336	Hombrechtikon ZH	Rüti ZH			Hombrechtikon, Rüti
H337	Uster ZH	Saland ZH			Uster, Pfäffikon, Saland
H338	Sihlbrugg ZH	Wädenswil ZH			Sihlbrugg, Wädenswil
H339	Illnau ZH	Feldbach ZH			Illnau, Uster, Mönchaltorf, Esslingen, Oetwil am See, Hombrechtikon, Feldbach
H340	Zürich ZH	Hinwil ZH			Zürich (Schwamendingen), Hegnau, Uster, Wetzikon, Hinwil
H340.1	Zimikon ZH	Volketswil ZH			Zimikon H340 (Industriestrasse), Volketswil (Stationsstrasse)
H342	Dietikon ZH	Zürich			H3 («beim Kreuz» nordwestlich von Dietikon), Dietikon, Schlieren, Zürich
H343	Flurlingen ZH	Schloss Laufen ZH			H15, A 4, Schloss Laufen
H343.1	Siblingen SH	Wilchingen SH	16	9.9	H14 Siblingen, Gächlingen, Neunkirch, Hallau, H13, Wilchingen, (Jestetten L165)
H344	Kloten ZH	Henggart ZH			Kloten, Embrach, H7, Pfungen, Aesch, Henggart, H15
H345	Grafstal ZH	Eschenbach SG	32	20	Grafstal H1, Oberkemptthal, Pfäffikon, Rüti, Eschenbach H8
H346	Grafstal ZH				Grafstal ( A 1, H345)
H347	Zürich	Esslingen ZH			Zürich, Forch, Esslingen
H347.1	Oetwil am See ZH	Grüt ZH			Oetwil am See, Lehrüti, A 52, Gossau, Grüt
H347.2	Ottikon ZH	Bauma ZH			A 52 Ottikon, Grüt, Wetzikon, Bäretswil, Bauma
H348	Glattfelden ZH	Zürich			Glattfelden H7, Neerach, Rümlang, Zürich (Seebach)
H348.1	Dielsdorf ZH	Embrach ZH			Dielsdorf (Bypass), Neeracher Riet (Kreisel), Höri, Bülach, Eschenmosen, Embrach H344
H349	Kloten ZH				Connection road Flughafen Kloten
H350	Kloten ZH	Baltenswil ZH			H349 (Flughafen Kloten), Kloten, Bassersdorf, Baltenswil
H351	Zürich	Glattbrugg ZH			Zürich (Thurgauerstrasse), Glattbrugg H4
H352	Andelfingen ZH	Stein am Rhein SH	19	12	Andelfingen, H15, A 4, Ossingen, H14, Unterstammheim, Etzwilen, H13 Stein am Rhein
H353	Rickenbach ZH	Uesslingen TG	7	4.3	H1, Rickenbach, Uesslingen
H354	Hegnau ZH	Tägerschen TG	37	23	Hegnau, Fehraltorf, Wildberg, Turbenthal H15, Bichelsee, Münchwilen H7, Tägerschen H16
H361	Littau LU	Luzern			H2a, Littau, Luzern
H361.1	Kriens LU	Horw LU			Kriens, Horw
H362	Ettiswil LU	Gerliswil LU			Ettiswil, Ruswil, Gerliswil
H363	Schenkon LU				Schenkon (Zellfeld, Zollhaus)
H363.1	Beromünster LU	Emmen LU			Beromünster, Neudorf, Rothenburg, Emmen (Sprengi)
H363.2	Emmen LU	Luzern			A 2 Emmen, Süd, Sedel, Luzern H4
H364	Wolhusen LU	Ruswil LU			Wolhusen, Ruswil
H364.1	Flühli LU	Sörenberg LU			H10 Landbrügg, Flühli, Sörenberg
H365	Gettnau LU	Willisau LU			Gettnau, Willisau
H366	Mosen LU	Aesch LU			Mosen, Aesch
H367	Mettlen LU	Ebikon LU			H26, Mettlen, Oberhofen, Ebikon
H368	Sins ZG	Küssnacht SZ			H25 Sins, Hünenberg, Holzhäusern, Risch, Küssnacht
H369	Goldau SZ	Schwyz			Goldau, Steinen, Schwyz
H370	Wolfsprung SZ	Morschach SZ			Wolfsprung H2, Morschach (Schwyzerhöhe, Rüti)
H371	Oberarth SZ	Sattel SZ			Oberarth, Steinerberg, Sattel
H374	Achereggbrücke NW	Engelberg OW			Achereggbrücke, Stansstad, Stans, Engelberg
H375	Sarnen	Stalden OW			Sarnen, Stalden
H376	Sarnen	Wilen OW			Sarnen, Wilen
H377	Sarnen	Treib UR			Sarnen, Kerns, Stans, Buochs, Beckenried, Emmetten, Seelisberg, Treib
H377.1	Stans	Buochs NW			Stans, Ennetbürgen, Buochs
H378	Kerns OW	Stöckalp OW			Kerns, Melchtal, Stöckalp
H378.1	Sachseln OW	Flüeli-Ranft OW			Sachseln, Flüeli-Ranft
H381	Zug	Sattel SZ			H25 Zug, Aegeri, Sattel, H8
H382	Cham ZG	Zürich			H4 Cham, Affoltern am Albis, Zürich
H382.2	Bergmoos ZH	Birmensdorf ZH			A 1 Bergmoos, Birmensdorf H382
H383	Mettmenstetten ZH	Zürich			Mettmenstetten, Unter, Rifferswil, Riedmatt, Albis, Adliswil, Zürich (Wollishofen)
H386	Biberbrugg SZ	Oberiberg SZ			Biberbrugg, Rabennest, Birchli, Gross, Steinbachviadukt, Euthal, Unteriberg, Oberiberg
H386.1	Rabennest SZ	Brunni SZ			Rabennest, Einsiedeln, Trachslau, Alpthal, Brunni
H387	Schwyz	Hinterthal SZ			Schwyz, Muotathal, Hinterthal
H388	Schindellegi SZ	Richterswil ZH			Schindellegi, Samstagern, A 3 Richterswil, Richterswil
H389	Schindellegi SZ	Richterswil ZH			Schindellegi, Wollerau, Richterswil
H390	Lachen SZ	Gommiswald SG	15	9.3	Lachen H3, Tuggen, Uznach H17, Gommiswald
H390.1	Siebnen SZ	Wangen SZ			Siebnen, Wangen
H391	Schübelbach SZ	Tuggen SZ			Schübelbach, Tuggen
H392	Siebnen SZ	Innerthal SZ			Siebnen, Rempen, Vorderthal, Innerthal
H393	Mendrisio TI	Arzo TI			Mendrisio, Rancate, Arzo, (Viggiù)
H394	Gaggiolo TI	Mendrisio TI			Gaggiolo, Stabio, Genestrerio, Croce Grande, Mendrisio
H395	Croce Grande TI	Chiasso TI			Croce Grande, Genestrerio, Boscherina, Novazzano, Pobbia, Chiasso
H396	Novazzano TI	Marcetto TI			Novazzano, Marcetto, (Ronago)
H396.1	Novazzano TI	Brusata di Novazzano TI			Novazzano, Brusata di Novazzano, (Bizzarone)
H397	Chiasso TI	Pizzamiglio TI			Chiasso, Pizzamiglio, (Maslianico)
H398	Fornasette TI	Lamone TI			(Luino), Fornasette, Ponte Tresa SS 233, Agno, H2 Lamone
H399	Agno TI	Gandria TI			Agno, Lugano, Gandria, (Menaggio SS 340)
H399.1	Lugano TI	Tesserete TI			Lugano, Canobbio, Tesserete
H399.2	Viganello TI	Ruvigliana TI			Viganello, Ruvigliana (Crossing Via Fulmignano and Strada di Gandria)
H400	Manno TI	Cadempino TI			Manno, Cadempino
H401	Bioggio TI	Massagno TI			Bioggio, Crespera, Cinque Vie, Lugano, Massagno
H402	Lugano TI				Lugano (Cornaredo, Ponte sul Cassarate, Piano Stampa)
H403	Bissone TI				Bissone, (Campione d'Italia)
H404	Lugano TI	Grancia TI			Lugano, Paradiso, Grancia, Cernesio, Figino, Abzweigung nach Ponte Tresa, Cadepiano, Grancia
H405	Dirinella TI	Quartino TI			( SS 394 Luino), Dirinella, Vira (Gambarogno), Quartino
H406	Gordola TI	Cadenazzo TI			Gordola, Quartino, Cadenazzo
H407	Bignasco TI	Solduno TI			Bignasco, Ponte Brolla, Solduno
H407.1	Muralto TI	San Antonio TI			Muralto, Orselina, Madonna del Sasso, Locarno/San Antonio
H407.2	Intragna TI	Ponte Brolla TI			Intragna, Ponte Brolla
H408	Biasca TI	Bellinzona			Biasca, Iragna, Gorduno, Bellinzona
H409	Bodio TI	Personico TI			Bodio, Personico
H410	Lavorgo TI	Chironico TI			Lavorgo, Nivo, Chironico
H411	Rodi-Fiesso TI	Dalpe TI			Rodi-Fiesso, Prato (Leventina), Dalpe
H412	Airolo TI	Nante TI			Airolo, Nante
H413	Ulrichen VS	Airolo TI			Ulrichen, Nufenenpass, All'Acqua, Airolo
H414	Landquart GR	St. Luzisteig GR			Landquart, Maienfeld, St. Luzisteig, (Balzers)
H415	Landquart GR	Malans GR			Landquart, Malans
H416	Disentis/Mustér GR	Biasca TI			Disentis/Mustér, Lukmanierpass, Olivone, Biasca
H416.1	Olivone TI	Ghirone TI			Olivone, Campo Blenio, Ghirone
H416.3	Ilanz GR	Obersaxen GR			Ilanz, Obersaxen (Meierhof)
H416.4	Ilanz GR	Vignogn GR			Ilanz, Vella, Vignogn
H417	Thusis GR	Davos GR			Thusis, Sils im Domleschg, Tiefencastel, Surava, Davos Wiesen, Davos
H417.5	Surava GR	Bergün/Bravuogn GR			Surava, Filisur, Bergün/Bravuogn
H418	Spissermühle GR	Samnaun GR			Spissermühle, Samnaun
H419	Champfèr GR	St. Moritz GR			Champfèr, Via Somplaz, St. Moritz
H421	La Motta GR	Forcola di Livigno GR			La Motta GR H29, Forcola di Livigno, (Livigno)
H422	Schwanden GL	Elm GL			Schwanden, Elm
H426	Uznach SG	Neuhaus SG	3	1.9	H17 Uznach, Uznaberg, Neuhaus H8
H427	Reichenburg SZ	Ricken SG	14	8.7	H3 Reichenburg, Kaltbrunn, H17, Gommiswald, Ricken H8
H427.1	Bilten SG	Schänis SG	1	0.62	A 3 Bilten, Schänis H17
H428	Eschenbach SG	Schmerikon SG	5	3.1	H8 Eschenbach, Schmerikon H17
H429	Ziegelbrücke SG	Amden SG	8	5.0	H17 Ziegelbrücke, Weesen, Amden
H430	Wil SG	Gossau SG	17	11	H16 Wil SG, Oberuzwil, Flawil, Gossau H7
H430.1	Rickenbach TG	Gähwil SG	8	5.0	Rickenbach H16, Kirchberg, Gähwil
H431	Lütisburg SG	Flawil SG	10	6.2	Lütisburg H16, Flawil
H432	Flawil SG	Degersheim SG	5	3.1	Flawil, Degersheim
H433	Gams SG	Haag SG	4	2.5	H16 Gams, Haag H13, A 13, (Bendern)
H433.1	Sevelen SG		2	1.2	Sevelen H13 / A 13, (Vaduz)
H434	Oberriet SG		1	0.62	Oberriet H13 / A 13, (Feldkirch)
H434.1	Sennwald SG		2	1.2	Sennwald H13, A 13, (Ruggell)
H435	Berneck SG	Au SG	3	1.9	Berneck, Au H13, A 13, (Lustenau B 204 (Lustenauer Straße))
H436	St. Margrethen SG		2	1.2	St. Margrethen ( H7, A 1, H13)
H437	Wil SG	Kehlhof (Berg) TG	18	11	H7/ H16 Wil, Mettlen, Bürglen H14, Kehlhof (Berg)
H438	Altstätten SG	Kriessern SG	5	3.1	Altstätten H13, Kriessern, A 13
H439	Sargans SG		1	0.62	Sargans (Postplatz/Schwefelbadplatz, A 3)
H441	St. Gallen	Abtwil SG	2	1.2	St. Gallen (Bild H7), Abtwil
H443	Wil SG		1	0.62	Wil ( H16, East bypass autostrasse Wil)
H444	Oberuzwil SG	Bischofszell TG	13	8.1	Oberuzwil, A 1 Uzwil, Oberbüren, Niederbüren, Bischofszell
H445	St. Gallen	Diepoldsau SG	32	20	H7 St. Gallen, Eggersriet, Heiden, Berneck, H13, Widnau, A 13, Diepoldsau, (Hohenems)
H446	St. Gallen	Trogen AR	9	5.6	H7 St. Gallen, Speicher, Trogen
H447	St. Gallen	Altstätten	26	16	H7 St. Gallen, Teufen, Gais, Altstätten H13
H448	Neu St. Johann SG	Gais AR	37	23	H16 Neu St. Johann, Schwägalp, Urnäsch, Appenzell, Gais
H449	Bad Ragaz SG	Maienfeld GR	2	1.2	H3 / H13 Bad Ragaz, A 13, Maienfeld
H450	Lömmenschwil SG	Egnach TG	6	3.7	Lömmenschwil, Neukirch, Egnach H13
H451	Wittenbach SG	Arbon TG	8	5.0	Wittenbach, Arbon H13
H452	Goldach SG		1	0.62	Goldach ( A 1.1, H7)
H458	Appenzell	Wasserauen AI	6	3.7	Appenzell, Weissbad, Wasserauen
H458.1	Appenzell	Steinegg AI	2	1.2	H448 Appenzell, Steinegg H458
H459	Appenzell	Hundwil AR	9	5.6	Appenzell, Hundwil H463
H462	Urnäsch AR	Waldstatt AR	6	3.7	Urnäsch, Waldstatt
H463	Waldstatt AR	Rheineck SG	37	23	Waldstatt, Hundwil, Teufen, Trogen, Heiden, Rheineck H7 / H13
H465	Frauenfeld	Hüttwilen TG	7	4.3	H14 Frauenfeld, Hüttwilen
H466	Frauenfeld	Mettlen TG	21	13	H1/ H14 Frauenfeld, Wängi, Lommis, Affeltrangen H16, Märwil, Mettlen
H466.1	Aadorf TG	Matzingen TG	4	2.5	H7 Aadorf, Matzingen (Alp)
H467	Pfyn TG	Steckborn TG	10	6.2	H1 Pfyn, Steckborn H13
H468	Eschlikon	Münchwilen TG	4	2.5	Eschlikon, Sirnach, Münchwilen H7
H468.1	Fischingen TG	Wil SG	7	4.3	Fischingen, Sirnach, Wil (Bild)
H469	Weinfelden TG	Mauren TG	3	1.9	Weinfelden, Mauren
H470	Kreuzlingen TG	Herisau	38	24	(Konstanz), Kreuzlingen, Sulgen, Bischofszell, Gossau, Herisau
H471	Scherzingen TG	St. Gallen	30	19	H13 Scherzingen, Oberaach, Amriswil H14, Lömmenschwil, Wittenbach, St. Gallen H7
H472	Bischofszell TG	Amriswil TG	6	3.7	Bischofszell, Zihlschlacht, H14 Amriswil
H473	Amriswil TG	Kesswil TG	6	3.7	H14 Amriswil, Kesswil H13
H474	Amriswil TG	Arbon TG	9	5.6	H14 Amriswil, Neukirch, H13 Arbon

=== Restricted accessible main roads ===
Main roads with number 500 and upwards are only accessible for vehicles of a maximum width of 2.3 m (7.5 ft).

Route number	Starting point	Ending point	Length (km)	Length (mi)	Route path
H505	Jaun FR				H189 Jaun, Cantonal border FR/BE H219
H507	Orsières VS	Champex VS			Orsières, Champex
H509	Gampel VS	Goppenstein VS			Gampel, Goppenstein
H511	Gletsch VS	Realp UR			Gletsch, Furkapass, Realp (part of H19)
H526	Gorges du Pichoux BE	Undervelier JU	5	3.1	Gorges du Pichoux, Undervelier (part of H248.4)
H536	Erlinsbach AG	Kienberg SO			Erlinsbach, Saalhöhe, Kienberg
H541	Rheinfelden AG	Gelterkinden BL			A 3 Rheinfelden, Magden, Buus, Gelterkinden
H556	Bürglen Brügg UR	Linthal GL			Bürglen Brügg, Klausenpass, Linthal (part of H17)
H558	Hinterrhein GR	Mesocco GR			Hinterrhein, San-Bernardino-Pass, Mesocco (part of H13)
H559	Santa Maria Val Müstair GR	Umbrailpass GR			Santa Maria Val Müstair, Umbrailpass, (Stilfser Joch SS 38dir-B)
H560	Camedo TI	Intragna TI			( SS 337 Domodossola), Camedo, Intragna
H561	Gotthard Pass TI	Motto Bartola TI			Gotthard Pass, "Tremola", Motto Bartola
H566	Chur	Arosa GR			Chur, Arosa
H567	Splügen GR	Splügenpass GR			Splügen, Splügenpass, (Chiavenna SS 36)
