= Schweizerische Isola-Werke =

Swiss electrical insulation manufacturer

- Company type: Joint-stock company
- Industry: Electrical insulation materials
- Founded: 1903 in Breitenbach, Switzerland
- Founder: Albert Borer
- Fate: Absorbed into Von Roll Holding AG (2005)
- Headquarters: Breitenbach, Switzerland
- Products: Materials for electrical engineering and other purposes
- Parent: Von Roll AG (from 1987)

The Schweizerische Isola-Werke was a Swiss company based in Breitenbach that developed, manufactured, and distributed materials for electrical engineering and other purposes. Founded in 1903, it was eventually absorbed into the Von Roll group.

== History ==
The company was founded in 1903 by Albert Borer to counter the population drift from the district of Thierstein caused by unemployment. Continuous investment in research and development brought success, and the company expanded after the First World War into Italy and France, and between 1950 and 1979 into other European countries, India, and the United States.

From 1982 it was temporarily owned by the United Technologies Essex Group; from 1987 the Isola-Werke and all its affiliated companies were taken over step by step by Von Roll AG, until in 2005 they were finally merged, as Von Roll Schweiz AG, into Von Roll Holding AG.

== Bibliography ==
- E. Reinhart, 50 Jahre Schweizerische Isola-Werke Breitenbach, 1953
- 75 Jahre Isola, 1978
