= Ripken =

Ripken is a surname. Notable people with the surname include:

- Billy Ripken (born 1964), American baseball player
- Cal Ripken Jr. (born 1960), American baseball player
- Cal Ripken Sr. (1935–1999), American baseball coach and manager, father of Billy and Cal Jr.

== See also ==
- Ripken (dog), named after Cal Ripken Jr.
- Karl-Heinz Ripkens (1937–2026), German footballer
- Ricken
