= Lucelle, Haut-Rhin =

Commune in Grand Est, France

Lucelle
- Commune
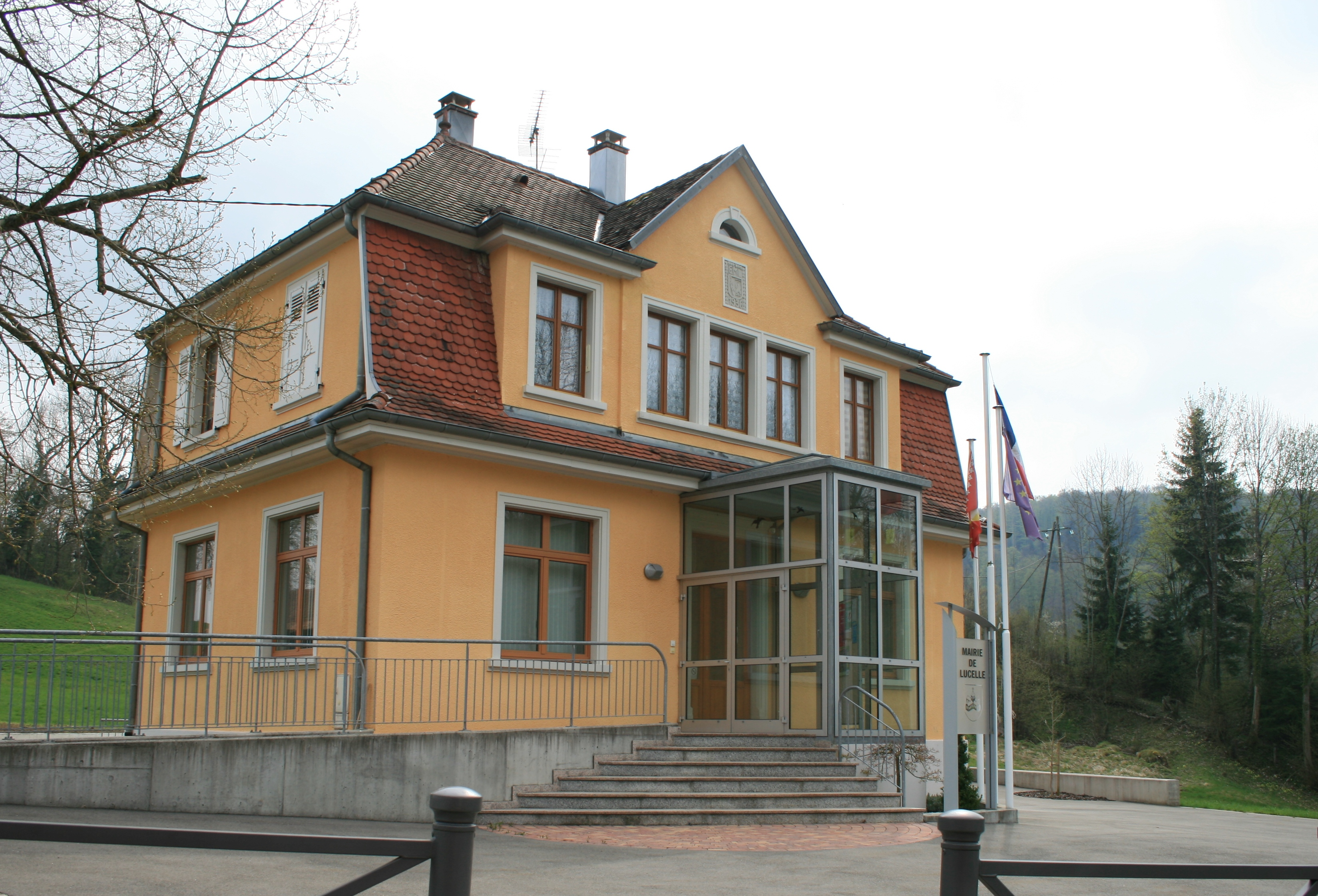
- The town hall of Lucelle

- Coat of arms
- Location of Lucelle
- Location within France Location within Grand Est
- Coordinates: 47°25′23″N 7°14′52″E
- Country: France
- Region: Grand Est
- Department: Haut-Rhin
- Arrondissement: Altkirch
- Canton: Altkirch

Government
  - Mayor (2020–2026): Bernard Fankhauser
- Area^{1}: 10.27 km^{2} (3.97 sq mi)
- Elevation: 700 m (2,300 ft)
- Highest elevation: 760 m (2,490 ft)
- Lowest elevation: 500 m (1,600 ft)
- Population (2023): 29
  - Density: 2.8/km^{2} (7.3/sq mi)
- Time zone: UTC+01:00 (CET)
  - Summer (DST): UTC+02:00 (CEST)
- INSEE/Postal code: 68190 /68480
- ^{1} French Land Register data, which excludes lakes, ponds, glaciers > 1 km^{2} (0.386 sq mi or 247 acres) and river estuaries.

Lucelle (French pronunciation: [lysɛl]; German: Lützel) is a commune in the Haut-Rhin department in Alsace in north-eastern France.

The commune comprises the French part of the hamlet of Lucelle, the other part being part of Pleigne, in the Swiss Canton of Jura.

== Geography ==
=== Climate ===
Lucelle has an oceanic climate (Köppen climate classification Cfb). The average annual temperature in Lucelle is 9.2 °C (48.6 °F). The average annual rainfall is 1,098.7 mm (43.26 in) with May as the wettest month. The temperatures are highest on average in July, at around 17.9 °C (64.2 °F), and lowest in January, at around 1.3 °C (34.3 °F). The highest temperature ever recorded in Lucelle was 36.0 °C (96.8 °F) on 20 July 2003; the coldest temperature ever recorded was −19.0 °C (−2.2 °F) on 20 December 2009.

Climate data for Lucelle (1981–2010 averages, extremes 1987−present)
Month	Jan	Feb	Mar	Apr	May	Jun	Jul	Aug	Sep	Oct	Nov	Dec	Year
Record high °C (°F)	18.2 (64.8)	20.1 (68.2)	23.0 (73.4)	25.8 (78.4)	29.1 (84.4)	34.0 (93.2)	36.0 (96.8)	35.4 (95.7)	29.5 (85.1)	27.6 (81.7)	21.2 (70.2)	22.9 (73.2)	36.0 (96.8)
Mean daily maximum °C (°F)	4.2 (39.6)	5.4 (41.7)	8.8 (47.8)	12.4 (54.3)	17.1 (62.8)	20.4 (68.7)	22.8 (73.0)	22.7 (72.9)	18.0 (64.4)	13.8 (56.8)	7.5 (45.5)	4.1 (39.4)	13.1 (55.6)
Daily mean °C (°F)	1.3 (34.3)	2.2 (36.0)	5.1 (41.2)	8.1 (46.6)	12.6 (54.7)	15.7 (60.3)	17.9 (64.2)	17.7 (63.9)	13.7 (56.7)	10.0 (50.0)	4.5 (40.1)	1.4 (34.5)	9.2 (48.6)
Mean daily minimum °C (°F)	−1.6 (29.1)	−1.1 (30.0)	1.4 (34.5)	3.9 (39.0)	8.1 (46.6)	10.9 (51.6)	12.9 (55.2)	12.7 (54.9)	9.4 (48.9)	6.2 (43.2)	1.6 (34.9)	−1.2 (29.8)	5.3 (41.5)
Record low °C (°F)	−14.5 (5.9)	−18.5 (−1.3)	−15.9 (3.4)	−6.5 (20.3)	−1.3 (29.7)	1.1 (34.0)	5.5 (41.9)	3.8 (38.8)	1.1 (34.0)	−7.1 (19.2)	−12.2 (10.0)	−19.0 (−2.2)	−19.0 (−2.2)
Average precipitation mm (inches)	55.4 (2.18)	64.6 (2.54)	82.9 (3.26)	84.1 (3.31)	121.3 (4.78)	107.7 (4.24)	102.6 (4.04)	104.9 (4.13)	95.3 (3.75)	102.1 (4.02)	90.7 (3.57)	87.1 (3.43)	1,098.7 (43.26)
Average precipitation days (≥ 1.0 mm)	10.2	10.6	11.7	11.9	14.0	12.5	12.2	11.7	10.0	11.9	12.7	12.6	142.0
Source: Meteociel

== See also ==
- Lucelle Abbey
- Communes of the Haut-Rhin département
