= Chevrens =

Hamlet of Anières in Geneva, Switzerland

Coordinates: 46°17′6″N 6°14′22″E

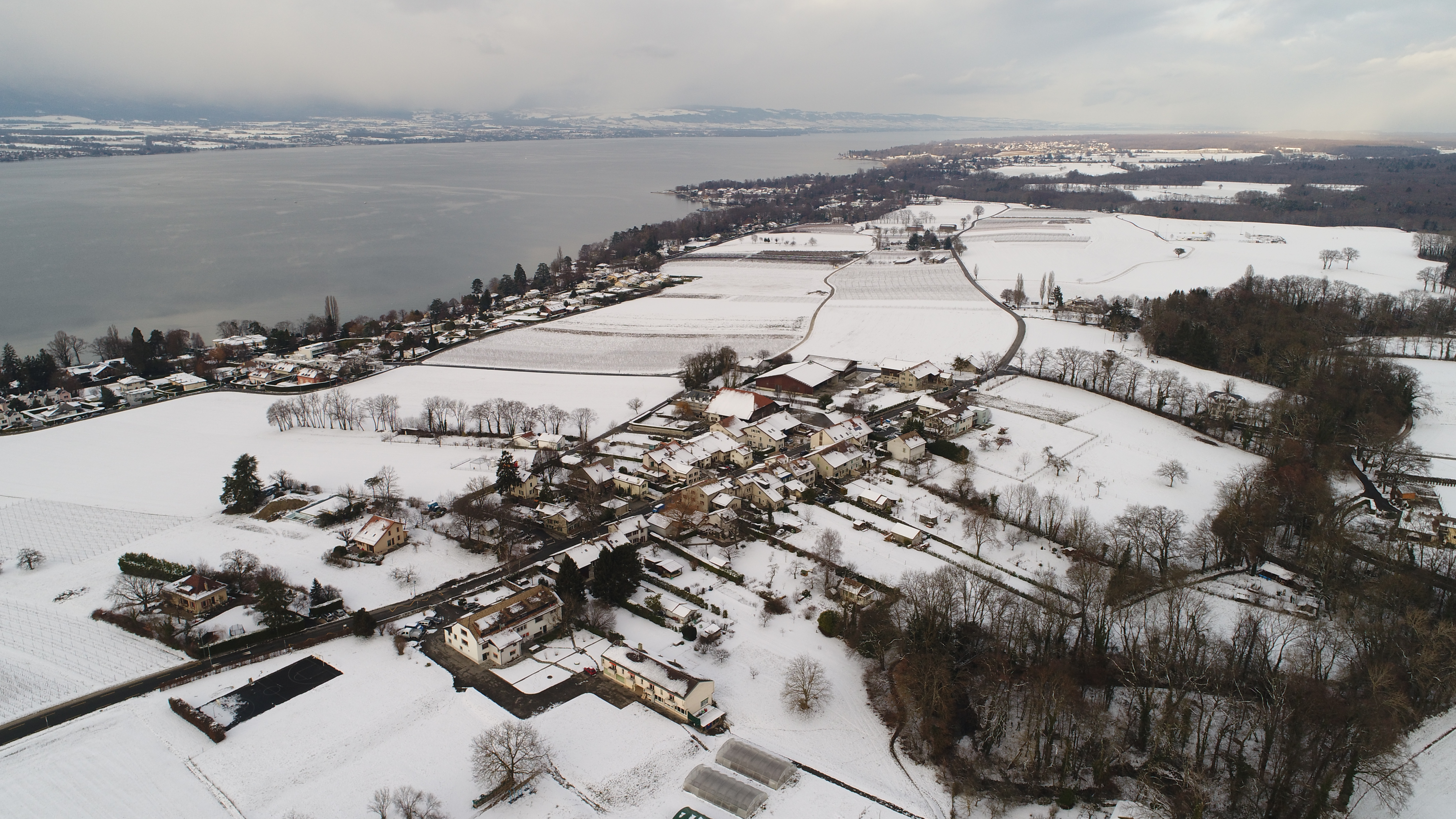
Chevrens, aerial view

Chevrens is a hamlet of Anières in Geneva, Switzerland. A wine growing area in a slender body of land between the French border and the left bank of Lake Geneva.
