= Grancia =

- Municipality
- Flag Coat of arms
- Location of Grancia
- Location within Switzerland Location within Canton of Ticino
- Coordinates: 45°58′N 8°56′E
- Country: Switzerland
- Canton: Ticino
- District: Lugano

Government
  - Mayor: Sindaco

Area
  - Total: 0.63 km^{2} (0.24 sq mi)
- Elevation: 320 m (1,050 ft)

Population (December 2004)
  - Total: 389
  - Density: 620/km^{2} (1,600/sq mi)
- Time zone: UTC+01:00 (CET)
  - Summer (DST): UTC+02:00 (CEST)
- Postal code: 6921
- SFOS number: 5186
- ISO 3166 code: CH-TI
- Surrounded by: Collina d'Oro, Lugano
- Website: https://www.grancia.ch SFSO statistics

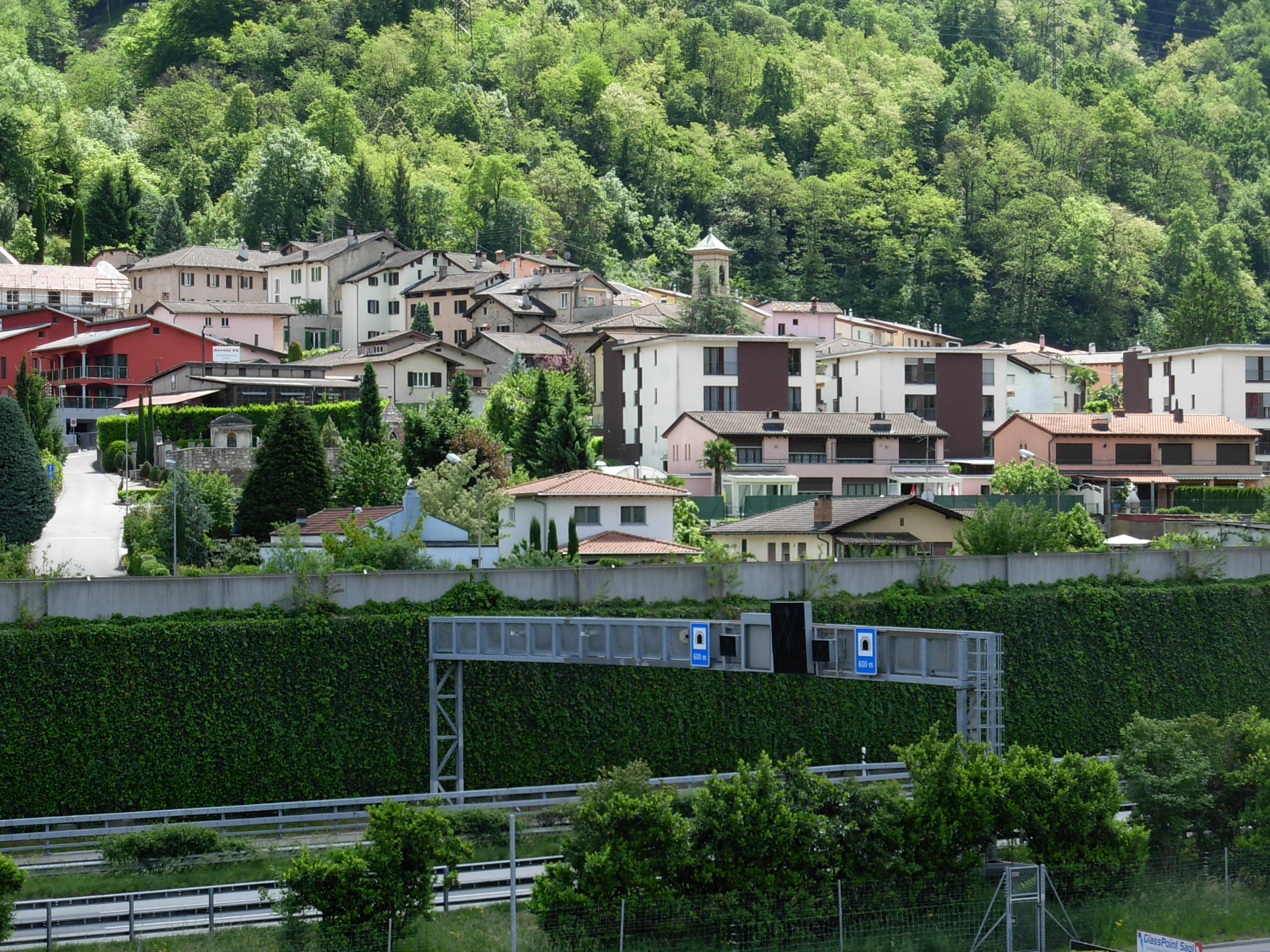
The village Grancia

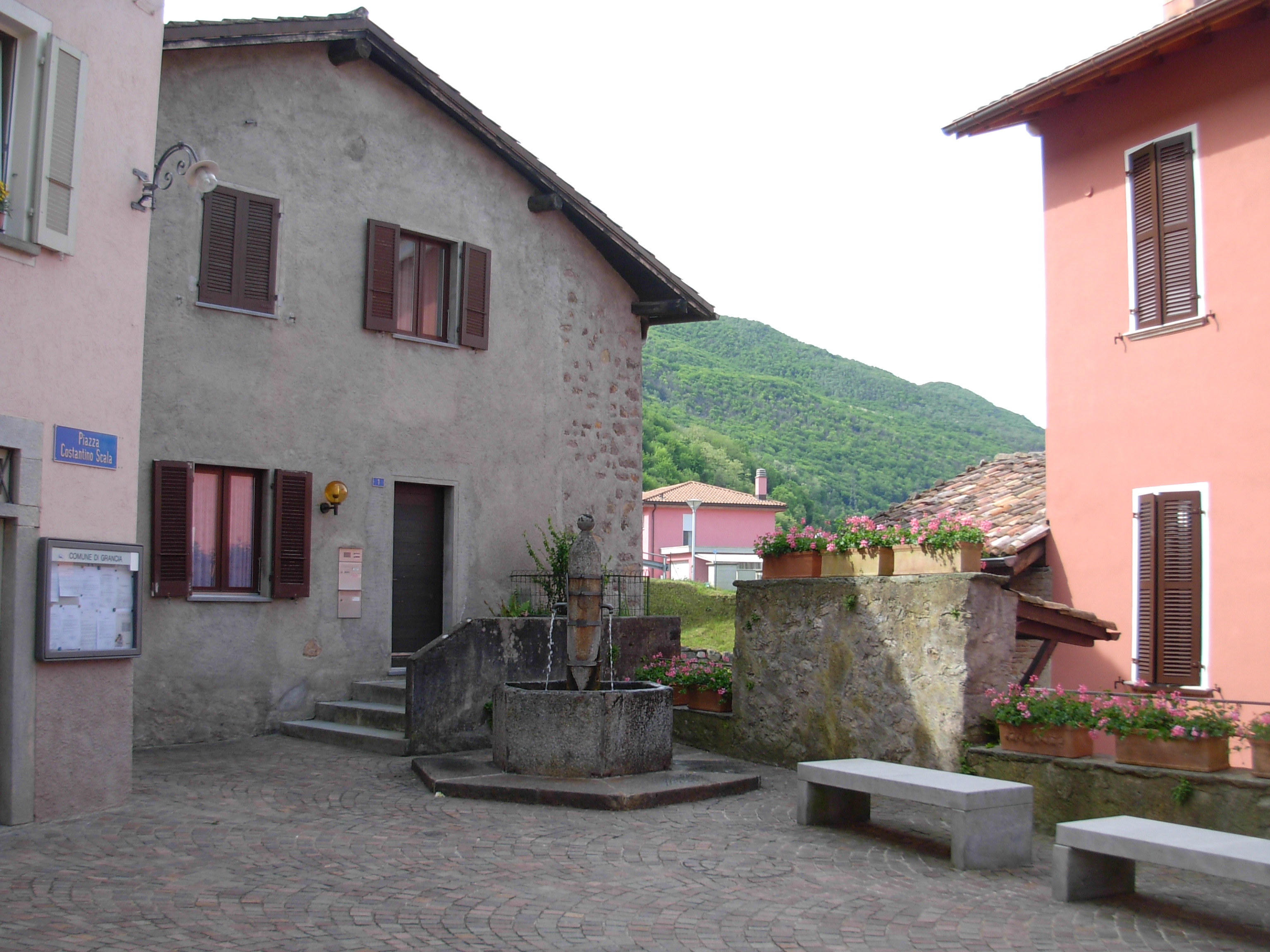
In the village Grancia

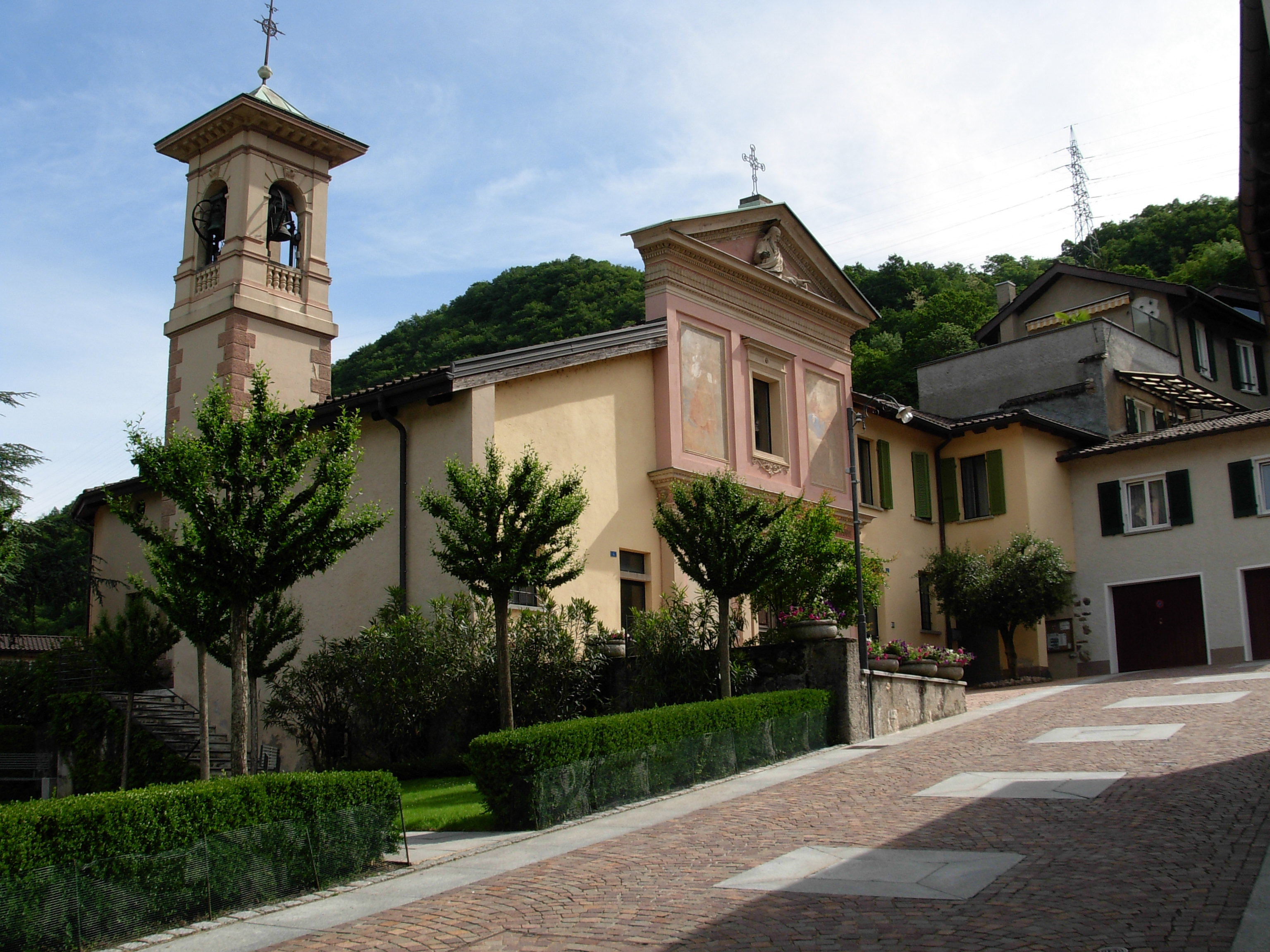
The church of San Cristoforo in Grancia

Grancia is a municipality in the district of Lugano in the canton of Ticino in Switzerland.

== History ==
Grancia is first mentioned in 1309 as in loco Grancie. Until 1825 it was part of the municipality of Carabbia.

At the end of the 13th century, there was a religious institution in Grancia that was under the authority of the monastery of S. Maria in Torello (now part of Carona). According to tradition, in the Middle Ages, Grancia had the largest granary in the region. Most of the grain came from Brusimpiano and was ground in the mills along the Pian Scairolo river.

The church of S. Carpoforo was probably built on the foundations of an older church in the 16th century. This church, along with S. Siro in Carabbia, belonged to the parish of S. Pietro in Pambio. In 1608, the two parishes broke away from Pambio, and in 1670 Grancia split from S. Siro.

The village economy relied mostly on farming. In the 19th century, a brick factory opened. In the last decades of the 20th century, industrial areas grew around Grancia. The industrial area and resulting development led to the construction of large shopping malls. New housing developments, access to the A2 motorway and huge storage tanks affect the environment and landscape of the village.

== Geography ==
Grancia has an area, as of 1997, of 0.63 square kilometers (0.24 sq mi). Of this area, 0.15 km^{2} (0.058 sq mi) or 23.8% is used for agricultural purposes, while 0.24 km^{2} (0.093 sq mi) or 38.1% is forested. Of the rest of the land, 0.31 km^{2} (0.12 sq mi) or 49.2% is settled (buildings or roads), 0.03 km^{2} (7.4 acres) or 4.8% is either rivers or lakes.

Of the built up area, industrial buildings made up 6.3% of the total area while housing and buildings made up 15.9% and transportation infrastructure made up 17.5%. Power and water infrastructure as well as other special developed areas made up 9.5% of the area Out of the forested land, 33.3% of the total land area is heavily forested and 4.8% is covered with orchards or small clusters of trees. Of the agricultural land, 4.8% is used for growing crops, while 3.2% is used for orchards or vine crops and 15.9% is used for alpine pastures. All the water in the municipality is flowing water.

The municipality is located in the Lugano district. It consists of the village of Grancia made up of four sections, including Campestro.

== Coat of arms ==
The blazon of the municipal coat of arms is Azure a pilgrim stick gules on a pale argent between two millet ears or.

== Demographics ==
Grancia has a population (as of December 2020) of 477. As of 2008, 35.3% of the population are resident foreign nationals. Over the last 10 years (1997–2007) the population has changed at a rate of 29.7%.

Most of the population (as of 2000) speaks Italian (88.0%), with German being second most common (6.3%) and Serbo-Croatian being third (1.9%). Of the Swiss national languages (as of 2000), 23 speak German, 6 people speak French, 322 people speak Italian. The remainder (15 people) speak another language.

As of 2008, the gender distribution of the population was 49.7% male and 50.3% female. The population was made up of 139 Swiss men (28.0% of the population), and 108 (21.7%) non-Swiss men. There were 186 Swiss women (37.4%), and 64 (12.9%) non-Swiss women.

In 2008 there were 2 live births to Swiss citizens and were 2 deaths of Swiss citizens. Ignoring immigration and emigration, the population of Swiss citizens remained the same while the foreign population remained the same. There was 1 Swiss man who immigrated back to Switzerland. At the same time, there were 7 non-Swiss men and 2 non-Swiss women who immigrated from another country to Switzerland. The total Swiss population change in 2008 (from all sources, including moves across municipal borders) was an increase of 21 and the non-Swiss population change was an increase of 13 people. This represents a population growth rate of 7.6%.

The age distribution, as of 2009, in Grancia is; 48 children or 9.7% of the population are between 0 and 9 years old and 63 teenagers or 12.7% are between 10 and 19. Of the adult population, 50 people or 10.1% of the population are between 20 and 29 years old. 85 people or 17.1% are between 30 and 39, 108 people or 21.7% are between 40 and 49, and 54 people or 10.9% are between 50 and 59. The senior population distribution is 56 people or 11.3% of the population are between 60 and 69 years old, 21 people or 4.2% are between 70 and 79, there are 12 people or 2.4% who are over 80.

As of 2000, there were 145 private households in the municipality, and an average of 2.5 persons per household. In 2000 there were 52 single family homes (or 63.4% of the total) out of a total of 82 inhabited buildings. There were 8 two family buildings (9.8%) and 17 multi-family buildings (20.7%). There were also 5 buildings in the municipality that were multipurpose buildings (used for both housing and commercial or another purpose).

The vacancy rate for the municipality, in 2008, was 0%. In 2000 there were 171 apartments in the municipality. The most common apartment size was the 3 room apartment of which there were 52. There were 6 single room apartments and 36 apartments with five or more rooms. Of these apartments, a total of 145 apartments (84.8% of the total) were permanently occupied, while 20 apartments (11.7%) were seasonally occupied and 6 apartments (3.5%) were empty. As of 2007, the construction rate of new housing units was 0 new units per 1000 residents.

The historical population is given in the following chart:

== Politics ==
In the 2007 federal election the most popular party was the CVP which received 44.07% of the vote. The next three most popular parties were the FDP (23.83%), the Ticino League (13.58%) and the SP (9.14%). In the federal election, a total of 108 votes were cast, and the voter turnout was 46.2%.

In the 2007 Gran Consiglio election, there were a total of 222 registered voters in Grancia, of which 151 or 68.0% voted. 1 blank ballot and 1 null ballot was cast, leaving 149 valid ballots in the election. The most popular party was the PPD+GenGiova which received 72 or 48.3% of the vote. The next three most popular parties were; the PLRT (with 25 or 16.8%), the SSI (with 17 or 11.4%) and the LEGA (with 15 or 10.1%).

In the 2007 Consiglio di Stato election, 1 blank ballot and 1 null ballot was cast, leaving 149 valid ballots in the election. The most popular party was the PPD which received 75 or 50.3% of the vote. The next three most popular parties were; the LEGA (with 22 or 14.8%), the PLRT (with 20 or 13.4%) and the PS (with 12 or 8.1%).

== Economy ==
As of 2007, Grancia had an unemployment rate of 4.45%. As of 2005, there were 4 people employed in the primary economic sector and about 2 businesses involved in this sector. 133 people were employed in the secondary sector and there were 9 businesses in this sector. 767 people were employed in the tertiary sector, with 74 businesses in this sector. There were 193 residents of the municipality who were employed in some capacity, of which females made up 45.6% of the workforce.

In 2000, there were 1,171 workers who commuted into the municipality and 145 workers who commuted away. The municipality is a net importer of workers, with about 8.1 workers entering the municipality for every one leaving. About 20.0% of the workforce coming into Grancia are coming from outside Switzerland, while 0.7% of the locals commute out of Switzerland for work. Of the working population, 9.8% used public transportation to get to work, and 65.8% used a private car.

As of 2009, there was one hotel in Grancia.

== Religion ==
From the 2000 census, 287 or 78.4% were Roman Catholic, while 16 or 4.4% belonged to the Swiss Reformed Church. There are 55 individuals (or about 15.03% of the population) who belong to another church (not listed on the census), and 8 individuals (or about 2.19% of the population) did not answer the question.

== Education ==
The entire Swiss population is generally well educated. In Grancia about 61.4% of the population (between age 25–64) have completed either non-mandatory upper secondary education or additional higher education (either university or a Fachhochschule).

In Grancia there were a total of 95 students (as of 2009). The Ticino education system provides up to three years of non-mandatory kindergarten and in Grancia there were 16 children in kindergarten. The primary school program lasts for five years and includes both a standard school and a special school. In the municipality, 19 students attended the standard primary schools and 2 students attended the special school. In the lower secondary school system, students either attend a two-year middle school followed by a two-year pre-apprenticeship or they attend a four-year program to prepare for higher education. There were 23 students in the two-year middle school and 1 in their pre-apprenticeship, while 13 students were in the four-year advanced program.

The upper secondary school includes several options, but at the end of the upper secondary program, a student will be prepared to enter a trade or to continue on to a university or college. In Ticino, vocational students may either attend school while working on their internship or apprenticeship (which takes three or four years) or may attend school followed by an internship or apprenticeship (which takes one year as a full-time student or one and a half to two years as a part-time student). There were 5 vocational students who were attending school full-time and 14 who attend part-time.

The professional program lasts three years and prepares a student for a job in engineering, nursing, computer science, business, tourism and similar fields. There were 2 students in the professional program.

As of 2000, there were 57 students from Grancia who attended schools outside the municipality.
