= Lucelle =

Coordinates: 47°25′23″N 7°14′52″E

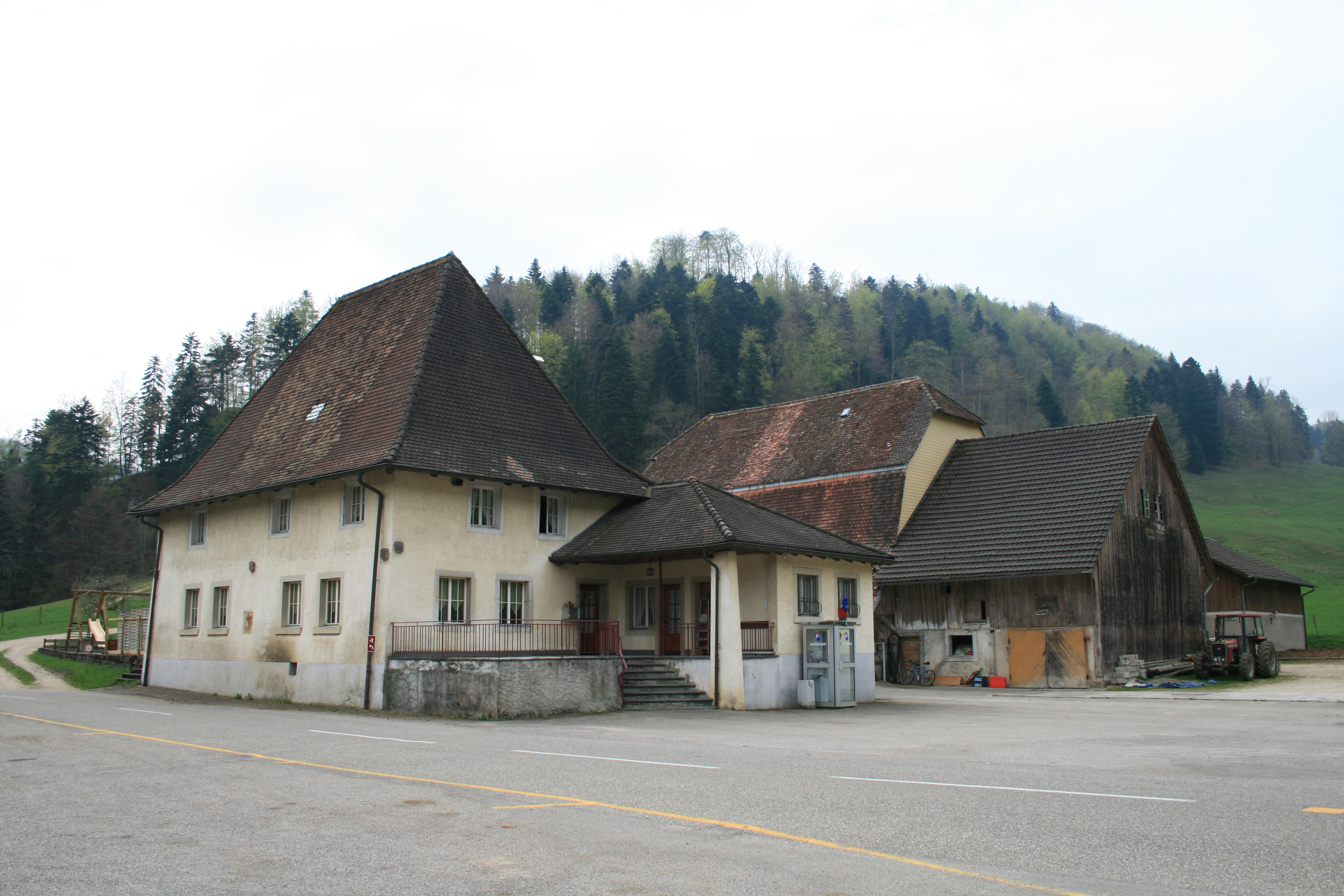
Lucelle

Lucelle (French pronunciation: [lysɛl]; German: Lützel) is a village situated on the Franco-Swiss border. It is divided between the two countries, the northern half (47 inhabitants in 1999) being part of the commune of Lucelle, Haut-Rhin, in the Haut-Rhin department, the southern half being part of Pleigne, in the Swiss Canton of Jura.

An important Cistercian monastery, Lucelle Abbey, was located here from the early 12th to the late 18th century.
