= Bööler Pass =

Mountain pass in the canton of Aargau in Switzerland

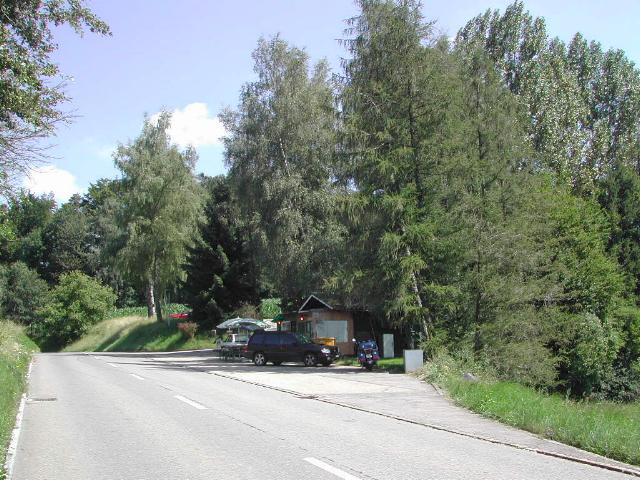
- Bööler Pass
- Interactive map of Bööler Pass
- Elevation: 611 m (2,005 ft)

Third Approach
- Location: Switzerland
- Coordinates: 47°18′26″N 8°05′03″E

Bööler Pass (el. 611 m.) is a mountain pass in the canton of Aargau in Switzerland.

It connects Unterkulm and Schöftland.
