= Altbüron =

- Municipality
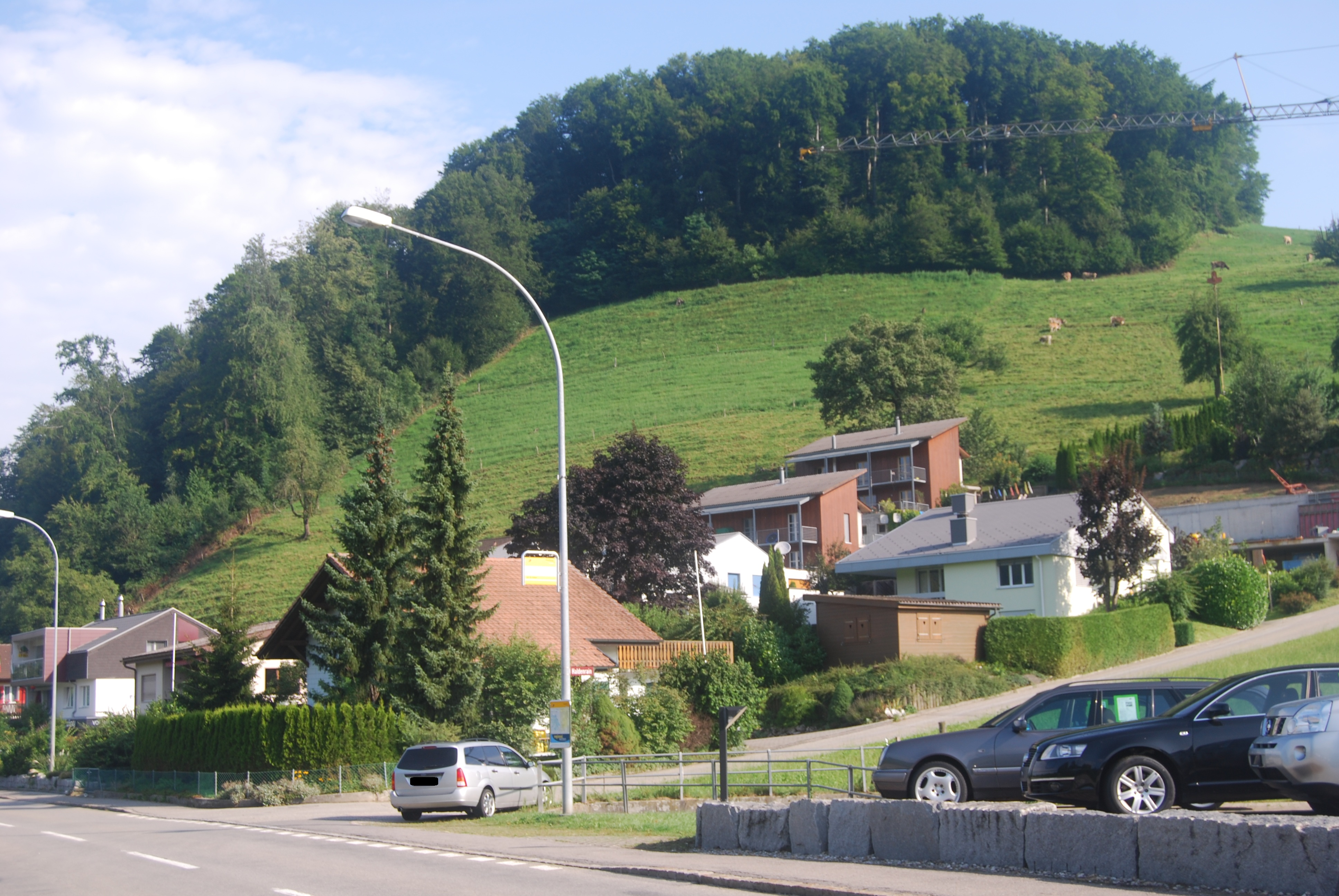

- Coat of arms
- Location of Altbüron
- Location within Switzerland Location within Canton of Lucerne
- Coordinates: 47°11′N 7°53′E
- Country: Switzerland
- Canton: Lucerne
- District: Willisau

Area
  - Total: 6.80 km^{2} (2.63 sq mi)
- Elevation: 545 m (1,788 ft)

Population (December 2020)
  - Total: 1,017
  - Density: 150/km^{2} (387/sq mi)
- Time zone: UTC+01:00 (CET)
  - Summer (DST): UTC+02:00 (CEST)
- Postal code: 6147
- SFOS number: 1122
- ISO 3166 code: CH-LU
- Surrounded by: Ebersecken, Grossdietwil, Melchnau (BE), Pfaffnau, Roggliswil
- Website: www.altbueron.ch

Altbüron is a municipality in the district of Willisau in the canton of Lucerne in Switzerland.

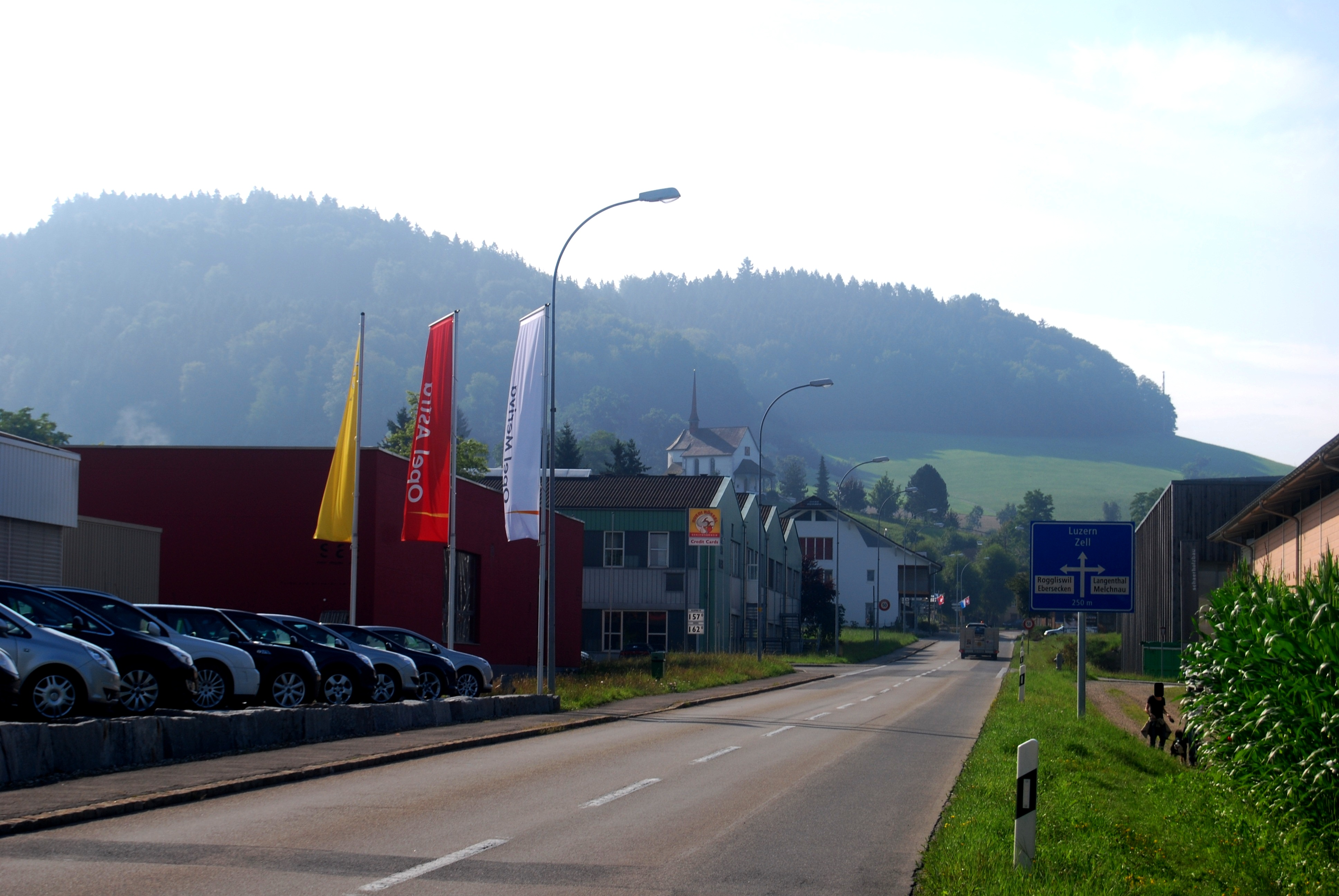
Altbüron

== History ==
Altbüron is first mentioned in 1194 as Alpurron.

== Geography ==
Altbüron has an area, as of 2006, of 6.8 km^{2} (2.6 sq mi). Of this area, 60.6% is used for agricultural purposes, while 29.6% is forested. The rest of the land, (9.7%) is settled. In the 1997 land survey, 29.65% of the total land area was forested. Of the agricultural land, 57.82% is used for farming or pastures, while 2.8% is used for orchards or vine crops. Of the settled areas, 3.83% is covered with buildings, 0.44% is industrial, 1.77% is classed as special developments, 0.15% is parks or greenbelts and 3.54% is transportation infrastructure.

The municipality is located in the Rot river valley (Rottal).

== Demographics ==
Altbüron has a population (as of 31 December 2020) of 1,017. As of 2007, 81 or about 9.0% are not Swiss citizens. Over the last 10 years the population has grown at a rate of 5.7%. Most of the population (as of 2000) speaks German (93.8%), with Albanian being second most common ( 3.5%) and Serbo-Croatian being third ( 1.9%).

In the 2007 election the most popular party was the CVP which received 39.2% of the vote. The next three most popular parties were the FDP (29.9%), the SVP (19.3%) and the Green Party (5.4%).

The age distribution, as of 2008, in Altbüron is; 238 people or 26.3% of the population is 0–19 years old. 228 people or 25.2% are 20–39 years old, and 314 people or 34.7% are 40–64 years old. The senior population distribution is 89 people or 9.8% are 65–79 years old, 34 or 3.8% are 80–89 years old and 1 people or 0.1% of the population are 90+ years old.

In Altbüron about 67.7% of the population (between age 25-64) have completed either non-mandatory upper secondary education or additional higher education (either university or a Fachhochschule).

As of 2000 there are 301 households, of which 53 households (or about 17.6%) contain only a single individual. 44 or about 14.6% are large households, with at least five members. As of 2000 there were 208 inhabited buildings in the municipality, of which 153 were built only as housing, and 55 were mixed use buildings. There were 113 single family homes, 22 double family homes, and 18 multi-family homes in the municipality. Most homes were either two (98) or three (37) story structures. There were only 15 single story buildings and 3 four or more story buildings.

Altbüron has an unemployment rate of 0.58%. As of 2005, there were 118 people employed in the primary economic sector and about 39 businesses involved in this sector. 203 people are employed in the secondary sector and there are 14 businesses in this sector. 136 people are employed in the tertiary sector, with 30 businesses in this sector. As of 2000 52.9% of the population of the municipality were employed in some capacity. At the same time, females made up 40% of the workforce.

In the 2000 census the religious membership of Altbüron was; 632 (71.6%) were Roman Catholic, and 120 (13.6%) were Protestant, with an additional 16 (1.81%) that were of some other Christian faith. There are 43 individuals (4.87% of the population) who are Muslim. Of the rest; there were 2 (0.23%) individuals who belong to another religion (not listed), 28 (3.17%) who do not belong to any organized religion, 42 (4.76%) who did not answer the question.

The historical population is given in the following table:

year	population
about 1695	65 taxed adults about 390 total
1798	823
1850	1,184
1900	767
1950	683
2000	883
