= Anières =

- Municipality
- Flag Coat of arms
- Location of Anières
- Location within Switzerland Location within Canton of Geneva
- Coordinates: 46°16′N 6°13′E
- Country: Switzerland
- Canton: Geneva
- District: n/a

Government
  - Mayor: Maire; Antoine Barde GPS (as of June 2015)

Area
  - Total: 3.86 km^{2} (1.49 sq mi)
- Elevation: 419 m (1,375 ft)

Population (December 2020)
  - Total: 2,381
  - Density: 617/km^{2} (1,600/sq mi)
- Time zone: UTC+01:00 (CET)
  - Summer (DST): UTC+02:00 (CEST)
- Postal code: 1247
- SFOS number: 6602
- ISO 3166 code: CH-GE
- Surrounded by: Corsier, Hermance, Veigy-Foncenex (FR-74), Versoix
- Website: www.anieres.ch

Anières is a municipality in the canton of Geneva in Switzerland.

The inhabitants are known as the "Aniérois". It is known for having some of the most expensive housing in the Geneva area.

== History ==
Anières is first mentioned in 1179 as [Guillelmus] dasneres. It became an independent municipality in 1858 when it separated from Corsier.

== Geography ==
Anières has an area, as of 2009, of 3.86 square kilometers (1.49 sq mi). Of this area, 2.44 km^{2} (0.94 sq mi) or 63.2% is used for agricultural purposes, while 0.18 km^{2} (0.069 sq mi) or 4.7% is forested. Of the rest of the land, 1.2 km^{2} (0.46 sq mi) or 31.1% is settled (buildings or roads), 0.01 km^{2} (2.5 acres) or 0.3% is either rivers or lakes.

Of the built up area, housing and buildings made up 22.5% and transportation infrastructure made up 6.2%. Out of the forested land, all of the forested land area is covered with heavy forests. Of the agricultural land, 52.1% is used for growing crops and 2.1% is pastures, while 9.1% is used for orchards or vine crops. All the water in the municipality is flowing water.

The municipality is located on the left bank of Lake Geneva. Two rivers border the commune: the Hermance and the Nant-d'Aisy. It consists of the village of Anières and the hamlets of Bassy and Chevrens.

The municipality of Anières consists of the sub-sections of Anières - lac, Anières - Hutins, Chevrens, Anières - douane and Anières - village.

== Demographics ==
Anières has a population (as of December 2020) of 2,381. As of 2008, 25.9% of the population are resident foreign nationals. Over the last 10 years (1999–2009 ) the population has changed at a rate of 15.5%. It has changed at a rate of 14.6% due to migration and at a rate of 1.7% due to births and deaths.

Most of the population (as of 2000) speaks French (1,578 or 77.7%), with English being second most common (166 or 8.2%) and German being third (94 or 4.6%). There is 1 person who speaks Romansh.

As of 2008, the gender distribution of the population was 49.6% male and 50.4% female. The population was made up of 761 Swiss men (30.2% of the population) and 488 (19.4%) non-Swiss men. There were 895 Swiss women (35.6%) and 372 (14.8%) non-Swiss women. Of the population in the municipality 310 or about 15.3% were born in Anières and lived there in 2000. There were 670 or 33.0% who were born in the same canton, while 246 or 12.1% were born somewhere else in Switzerland, and 638 or 31.4% were born outside of Switzerland.

In 2008 there were 13 live births to Swiss citizens and 9 births to non-Swiss citizens, and in same time span there were 9 deaths of Swiss citizens and 4 non-Swiss citizen deaths. Ignoring immigration and emigration, the population of Swiss citizens increased by 4 while the foreign population increased by 5. There was 1 Swiss man who immigrated back to Switzerland and 6 Swiss women who emigrated from Switzerland. At the same time, there were 22 non-Swiss men and 19 non-Swiss women who immigrated from another country to Switzerland. The total Swiss population change in 2008 (from all sources, including moves across municipal borders) was a decrease of 10 and the non-Swiss population increased by 13 people. This represents a population growth rate of 0.1%.

The age distribution of the population (as of 2000) is children and teenagers (0–19 years old) make up 28.4% of the population, while adults (20–64 years old) make up 57.9% and seniors (over 64 years old) make up 13.8%.

As of 2000, there were 833 people who were single and never married in the municipality. There were 958 married individuals, 106 widows or widowers and 134 individuals who are divorced.

As of 2000, there were 682 private households in the municipality, and an average of 2.7 persons per household. There were 143 households that consist of only one person and 67 households with five or more people. Out of a total of 704 households that answered this question, 20.3% were households made up of just one person and there were 2 adults who lived with their parents. Of the rest of the households, there are 185 married couples without children, 285 married couples with children There were 56 single parents with a child or children. There were 11 households that were made up of unrelated people and 22 households that were made up of some sort of institution or another collective housing.

In 2000 there were 407 single-family homes (or 76.8% of the total) out of a total of 530 inhabited buildings. There were 60 multi-family buildings (11.3%), along with 45 multi-purpose buildings that were mostly used for housing (8.5%) and 18 other use buildings (commercial or industrial) that also had some housing (3.4%). Of the single-family homes 65 were built before 1919, while 55 were built between 1990 and 2000. The greatest number of single-family homes (92) were built between 1981 and 1990.

In 2000 there were 729 apartments in the municipality. The most common apartment size was 5 rooms of which there were 162. There were 13 single-room apartments and 417 apartments with five or more rooms. Of these apartments, a total of 648 apartments (88.9% of the total) were permanently occupied, while 55 apartments (7.5%) were seasonally occupied and 26 apartments (3.6%) were empty. As of 2009, the construction rate of new housing units was 7.5 new units per 1000 residents. The vacancy rate for the municipality, in 2010, was 0.48%.

The historical population is given in the following chart:

== Politics ==
The name of the mayor is Antoine Barde, and the two assistants are Caroline Benbassat and Pascal Wassmer.

In the 2007 federal election the most popular party was the LPS Party which received 28.52% of the vote. The next three most popular parties were the SVP (19.61%), the Green Party (13.64%) and the CVP (11.17%). In the federal election, a total of 654 votes were cast, and the voter turnout was 52.7%.

In the 2009 Grand Conseil election, there were a total of 1,263 registered voters of which 615 (48.7%) voted. The most popular party in the municipality for this election was the Libéral with 35.1% of the ballots. In the canton-wide election they received the highest proportion of votes. The second most popular party was the Les Verts (with 11.7%), they were also second in the canton-wide election, while the third most popular party was the PDC (with 10.7%), they were fifth in the canton-wide election.

For the 2009 Conseil d'État election, there were a total of 1,259 registered voters of which 679 (53.9%) voted.

In 2011, all the municipalities held local elections, and in Anières there were 17 spots open on the municipal council. There were a total of 1,532 registered voters of which 764 (49.9%) voted. Out of the 764 votes, there were 2 blank votes, 1 null or unreadable votes and 94 votes with a name that was not on the list.

== Economy ==
As of 2010, Anières had an unemployment rate of 3.4%. As of 2008, there were 27 people employed in the primary economic sector and about 8 businesses involved in this sector. 27 people were employed in the secondary sector and there were 11 businesses in this sector. 252 people were employed in the tertiary sector, with 46 businesses in this sector.

There were 909 residents of the municipality who were employed in some capacity, of which females made up 44.9% of the workforce. In 2008 the total number of full-time equivalent jobs was 252. The number of jobs in the primary sector was 22, all of which were in agriculture. The number of jobs in the secondary sector was 26 of which 16 or (61.5%) were in manufacturing and 10 (38.5%) were in construction. The number of jobs in the tertiary sector was 204. In the tertiary sector; 36 or 17.6% were in wholesale or retail sales or the repair of motor vehicles, 4 or 2.0% were in the movement and storage of goods, 11 or 5.4% were in a hotel or restaurant, 1 was in the information industry, 1 was the insurance or financial industry, 8 or 3.9% were technical professionals or scientists, 36 or 17.6% were in education and 90 or 44.1% were in health care.

In 2000, there were 205 workers who commuted into the municipality and 763 workers who commuted away. The municipality is a net exporter of workers, with about 3.7 workers leaving the municipality for every one entering. About 21.0% of the workforce coming into Anières are coming from outside Switzerland, while 0.3% of the locals commute out of Switzerland for work. Of the working population, 15.2% used public transportation to get to work, and 66.7% used a private car.

The average income is very high at 478'065 Swiss Francs per year (2015).

== Religion ==
From the 2000 census, 692 or 34.1% were Roman Catholic, while 527 or 25.9% belonged to the Swiss Reformed Church. Of the rest of the population, there were 52 members of an Orthodox church (or about 2.56% of the population), there were 2 individuals (or about 0.10% of the population) who belonged to the Christian Catholic Church, and there were 38 individuals (or about 1.87% of the population) who belonged to another Christian church. There were 30 individuals (or about 1.48% of the population) who were Jewish, and 21 (or about 1.03% of the population) who were Islamic. There were 2 individuals who were Buddhist and 2 individuals who were Hindu. 441 (or about 21.71% of the population) belonged to no church, are agnostic or atheist, and 224 individuals (or about 11.03% of the population) did not answer the question.

== Education ==
In Anières about 519 or (25.6%) of the population have completed non-mandatory upper secondary education, and 587 or (28.9%) have completed additional higher education (either university or a Fachhochschule). Of the 587 who completed tertiary schooling, 38.2% were Swiss men, 30.8% were Swiss women, 18.6% were non-Swiss men and 12.4% were non-Swiss women.

During the 2009-2010 school year there were a total of 564 students in the Anières school system. The education system in the Canton of Geneva allows young children to attend two years of non-obligatory Kindergarten. During that school year, there were 41 children who were in a pre-kindergarten class. The canton's school system provides two years of non-mandatory kindergarten and requires students to attend six years of primary school, with some of the children attending smaller, specialized classes. In Anières there were 53 students in kindergarten or primary school and 6 students were in the special, smaller classes. The secondary school program consists of three lower, obligatory years of schooling, followed by three to five years of optional, advanced schools. There were 53 lower secondary students who attended school in Anières. There were 118 upper secondary students from the municipality along with 21 students who were in a professional, non-university track program. An additional 131 students attended a private school.

As of 2000, there were 14 students in Anières who came from another municipality, while 290 residents attended schools outside the municipality.
