= Carabbia =

- Quarter
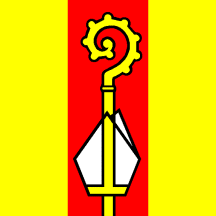
- Flag Coat of arms

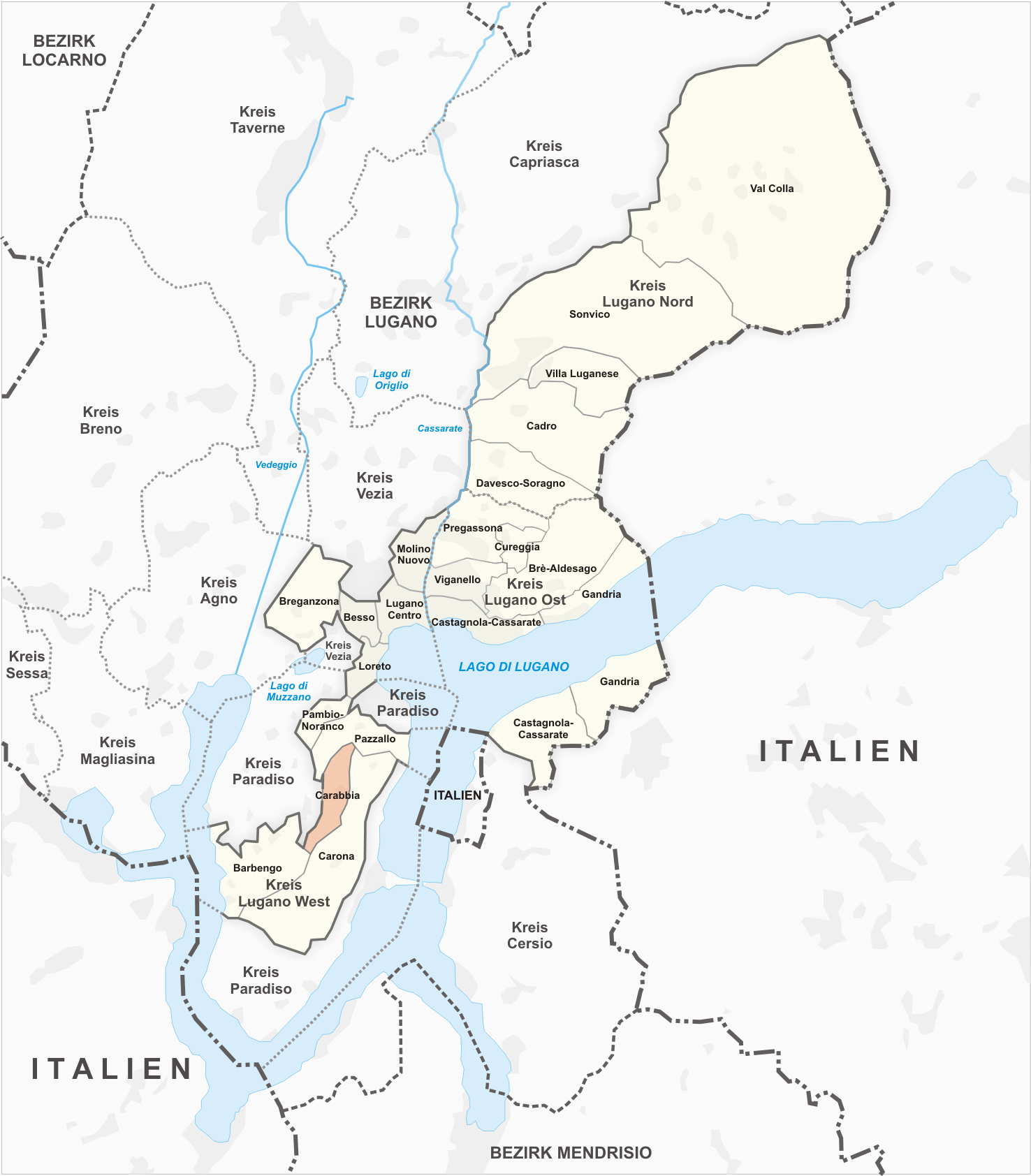
- Country: Switzerland
- Canton: Ticino
- District: Lugano
- City: Lugano

Area
  - Total: 1.07 km^{2} (0.41 sq mi)

Population (2012-12-31)
  - Total: 606
  - Density: 566/km^{2} (1,470/sq mi)

Carabbia is a quarter of the city of Lugano, Switzerland. Carabbia (founded 1213) was formerly a municipality of its own, having been incorporated into Lugano in 2008.
