= Ricken =

Ricken is both a surname and a given name. Notable people with the name include:

- Adalbert Ricken (1851–1921), German mycologist
- David L. Ricken (born 1952), American Roman Catholic bishop
- Lars Ricken (born 1976), German footballer
- Ricken Patel (born 1977), Canadian/British businessman

== See also ==
- Ricken Pass, a Swiss mountain pass
- Ricken Tunnel, a railway tunnel under the Ricken Pass
