= Breitenbach, Switzerland =

Breitenbach
- Municipality
- Coat of arms
- Location of Breitenbach
- Location within Switzerland Location within Canton of Solothurn
- Coordinates: 47°25′N 7°33′E
- Country: Switzerland
- Canton: Solothurn
- District: Thierstein

Area
  - Total: 6.83 km^{2} (2.64 sq mi)
- Elevation: 392 m (1,286 ft)

Population (December 2020)
  - Total: 3,979
  - Density: 583/km^{2} (1,510/sq mi)
- Time zone: UTC+01:00 (CET)
  - Summer (DST): UTC+02:00 (CEST)
- Postal code: 4226
- SFOS number: 2613
- ISO 3166 code: CH-SO
- Surrounded by: Brislach (BL), Büsserach, Fehren, Himmelried, Nunningen, Wahlen bei Laufen (BL), Zullwil
- Twin towns: Grossbreitenbach (Germany)
- Website: www.breitenbach.ch

Breitenbach (Swiss Standard German pronunciation: [ˈbraɪtn̩bax]; High Alemannic: Bräitebach) is a municipality in the district of Thierstein in the canton of Solothurn in Switzerland. There are two train stations near Breitenbach, the main being in Laufen and the other in Zwingen. As with most of Switzerland, there are Postauto buses which take people to surrounding cities and to and from the train station. Schweizerdeutsch (Swiss-German) in Breitenbach closely resembles that of Baseldeutsch (Basel-German).

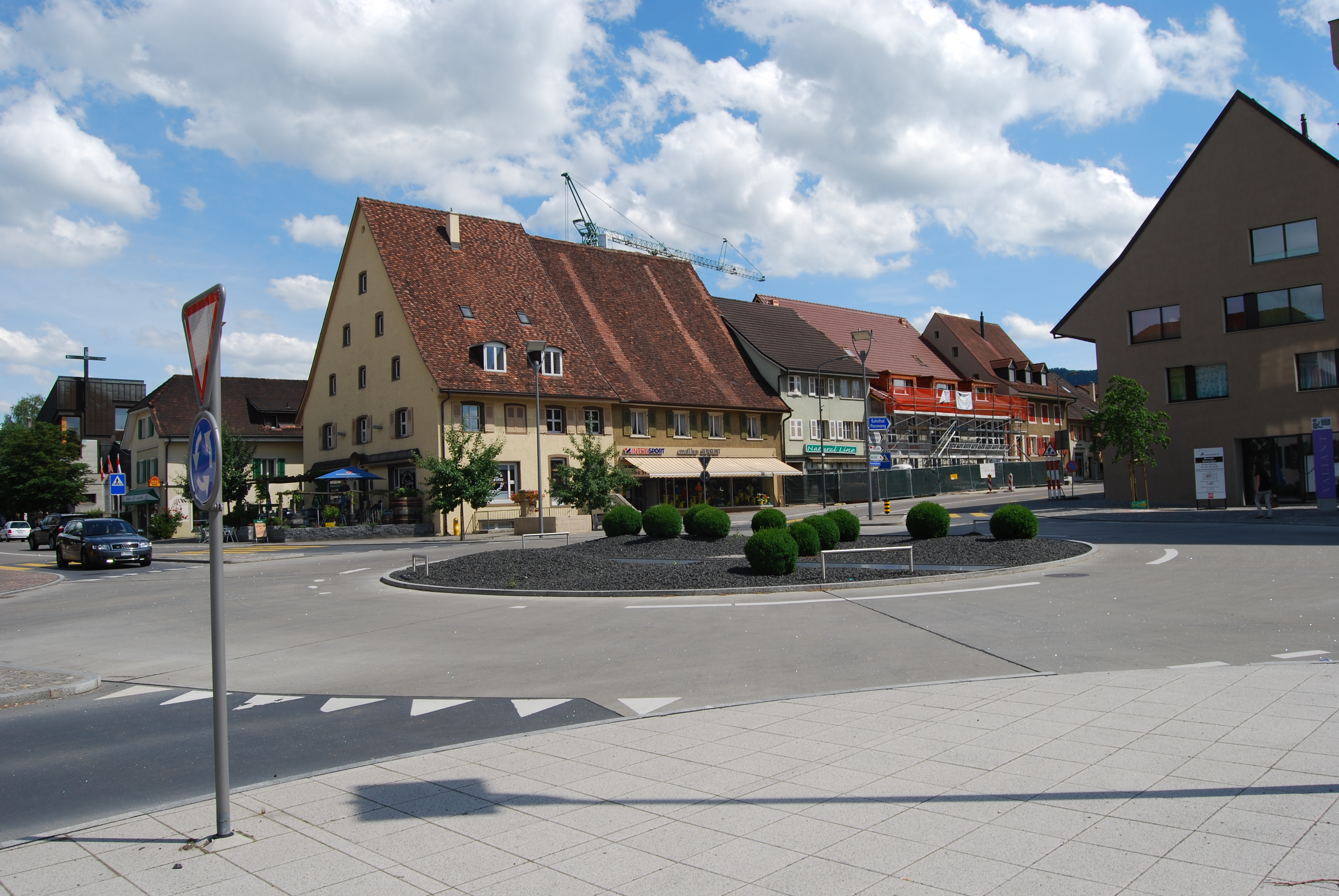
Breitenbach

== History ==
Breitenbach is first mentioned in 1152 as Breitenbach.

== Geography ==
Aerial view from 500 m by Walter Mittelholzer (1922)

Breitenbach has an area, as of 2009, of 6.8 square kilometers (2.6 sq mi). Of this area, 3.14 km^{2} (1.21 sq mi) or 46.2% is used for agricultural purposes, while 2.34 km^{2} (0.90 sq mi) or 34.4% is forested. Of the rest of the land, 1.32 km^{2} (0.51 sq mi) or 19.4% is settled (buildings or roads), 0.02 km^{2} (4.9 acres) or 0.3% is either rivers or lakes and 0.01 km^{2} (2.5 acres) or 0.1% is unproductive land.

Of the built up area, industrial buildings made up 2.4% of the total area while housing and buildings made up 11.2% and transportation infrastructure made up 4.4%. while parks, green belts and sports fields made up 1.3%. Out of the forested land, 32.9% of the total land area is heavily forested and 1.5% is covered with orchards or small clusters of trees. Of the agricultural land, 26.6% is used for growing crops and 17.4% is pastures, while 2.2% is used for orchards or vine crops. All the water in the municipality is flowing water.

The municipality is the capital of the Thierstein district and the Dorneck-Thierstein district. It is located on the Passwang Pass road at the entrance to the Gilgenbergerland area. It consists of the village of Breitenbach and the former parish center of Rohr.

== Coat of arms ==
The blazon of the municipal coat of arms is Per pale Or a Reed Vert with two leaves and Gules a Fess wavy Argent.

== Demographics ==
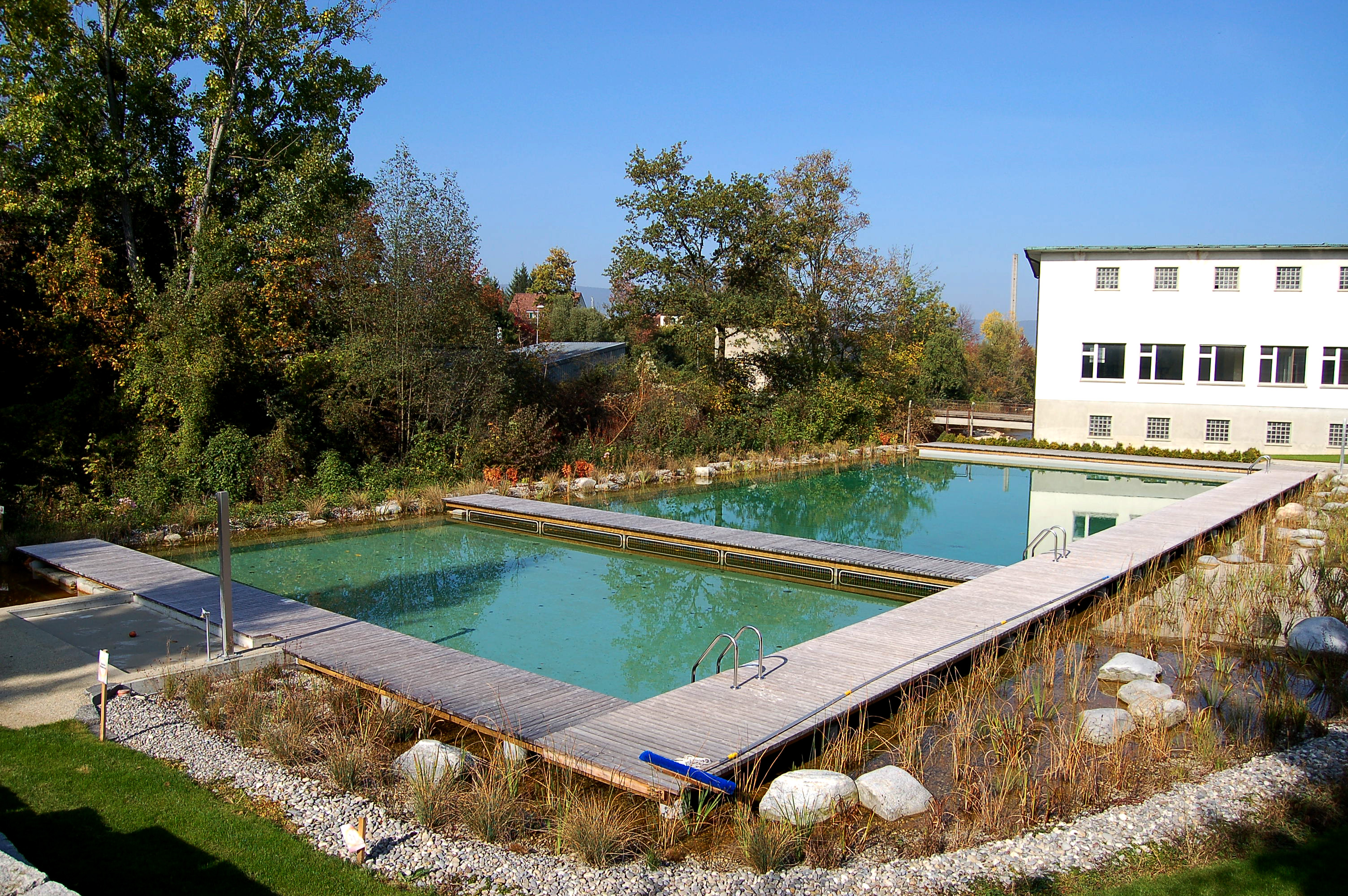
Nature park and open air swimming pool in Breitenbach

Breitenbach has a population (as of December 2020) of 3,979. As of 2008, 23.0% of the population are resident foreign nationals. Over the last 10 years (1999–2009 ) the population has changed at a rate of 11.1%. It has changed at a rate of 9.7% due to migration and at a rate of 2% due to births and deaths.

Most of the population (as of 2000) speaks German (2,694 or 82.6%), with Italian being second most common (138 or 4.2%) and Portuguese being third (90 or 2.8%). There are 24 people who speak French and 6 people who speak Romansh.

As of 2008, the gender distribution of the population was 49.6% male and 50.4% female. The population was made up of 1,268 Swiss men (36.3% of the population) and 462 (13.2%) non-Swiss men. There were 1,369 Swiss women (39.2%) and 391 (11.2%) non-Swiss women. Of the population in the municipality 932 or about 28.6% were born in Breitenbach and lived there in 2000. There were 580 or 17.8% who were born in the same canton, while 912 or 28.0% were born somewhere else in Switzerland, and 739 or 22.7% were born outside of Switzerland.

In 2008 there were 16 live births to Swiss citizens and 13 births to non-Swiss citizens, and in same time span there were 27 deaths of Swiss citizens and 2 non-Swiss citizen deaths. Ignoring immigration and emigration, the population of Swiss citizens decreased by 11 while the foreign population increased by 11. There was 1 Swiss man and 1 Swiss woman who emigrated from Switzerland. At the same time, there were 2 non-Swiss men and 5 non-Swiss women who immigrated from another country to Switzerland. The total Swiss population change in 2008 (from all sources, including moves across municipal borders) was an increase of 15 and the non-Swiss population increased by 2 people. This represents a population growth rate of 0.5%.

The age distribution, as of 2000, in Breitenbach is; 255 children or 7.8% of the population are between 0 and 6 years old and 554 teenagers or 17.0% are between 7 and 19. Of the adult population, 179 people or 5.5% of the population are between 20 and 24 years old. 984 people or 30.2% are between 25 and 44, and 793 people or 24.3% are between 45 and 64. The senior population distribution is 350 people or 10.7% of the population are between 65 and 79 years old and there are 145 people or 4.4% who are over 80.

As of 2000, there were 1,296 people who were single and never married in the municipality. There were 1,645 married individuals, 186 widows or widowers and 133 individuals who are divorced.

As of 2000, there were 1,259 private households in the municipality, and an average of 2.5 persons per household. There were 354 households that consist of only one person and 102 households with five or more people. Out of a total of 1,282 households that answered this question, 27.6% were households made up of just one person and there were 6 adults who lived with their parents. Of the rest of the households, there are 352 married couples without children, 466 married couples with children There were 62 single parents with a child or children. There were 19 households that were made up of unrelated people and 23 households that were made up of some sort of institution or another collective housing.

In 2000 there were 534 single family homes (or 72.6% of the total) out of a total of 736 inhabited buildings. There were 114 multi-family buildings (15.5%), along with 49 multi-purpose buildings that were mostly used for housing (6.7%) and 39 other use buildings (commercial or industrial) that also had some housing (5.3%). Of the single family homes 26 were built before 1919, while 94 were built between 1990 and 2000. The greatest number of single family homes (121) were built between 1946 and 1960.

In 2000 there were 1,332 apartments in the municipality. The most common apartment size was 4 rooms of which there were 370. There were 46 single room apartments and 469 apartments with five or more rooms. Of these apartments, a total of 1,224 apartments (91.9% of the total) were permanently occupied, while 60 apartments (4.5%) were seasonally occupied and 48 apartments (3.6%) were empty. As of 2009, the construction rate of new housing units was 6.7 new units per 1000 residents. The vacancy rate for the municipality, in 2010, was 1.78%.

The historical population is given in the following chart:

== Politics ==
In the 2007 federal election the most popular party was the FDP which received 32.08% of the vote. The next three most popular parties were the SVP (27.75%), the CVP (16.18%) and the SP (14.39%). In the federal election, a total of 945 votes were cast, and the voter turnout was 45.2%.

== Economy ==
As of 2010, Breitenbach had an unemployment rate of 3.8%. As of 2008, there were 35 people employed in the primary economic sector and about 10 businesses involved in this sector. 894 people were employed in the secondary sector and there were 27 businesses in this sector. 1,007 people were employed in the tertiary sector, with 126 businesses in this sector. There were 1,654 residents of the municipality who were employed in some capacity, of which females made up 41.2% of the workforce.

In 2008 the total number of full-time equivalent jobs was 1,637. The number of jobs in the primary sector was 27, of which 24 were in agriculture and 3 were in forestry or lumber production. The number of jobs in the secondary sector was 860 of which 803 or (93.4%) were in manufacturing and 58 (6.7%) were in construction. The number of jobs in the tertiary sector was 750. In the tertiary sector; 183 or 24.4% were in wholesale or retail sales or the repair of motor vehicles, 28 or 3.7% were in the movement and storage of goods, 25 or 3.3% were in a hotel or restaurant, 4 or 0.5% were in the information industry, 18 or 2.4% were the insurance or financial industry, 20 or 2.7% were technical professionals or scientists, 48 or 6.4% were in education and 338 or 45.1% were in health care.

In 2000, there were 1,690 workers who commuted into the municipality and 979 workers who commuted away. The municipality is a net importer of workers, with about 1.7 workers entering the municipality for every one leaving. About 8.3% of the workforce coming into Breitenbach are coming from outside Switzerland. Of the working population, 18.7% used public transportation to get to work, and 51.3% used a private car.

== Religion ==
From the 2000 census, 2,068 or 63.4% were Roman Catholic, while 401 or 12.3% belonged to the Swiss Reformed Church. Of the rest of the population, there were 85 members of an Orthodox church (or about 2.61% of the population), there were 11 individuals (or about 0.34% of the population) who belonged to the Christian Catholic Church, and there were 38 individuals (or about 1.17% of the population) who belonged to another Christian church. There were 122 (or about 3.74% of the population) who were Islamic. There were 2 individuals who were Buddhist, 16 individuals who were Hindu and 1 individual who belonged to another church. 382 (or about 11.72% of the population) belonged to no church, are agnostic or atheist, and 134 individuals (or about 4.11% of the population) did not answer the question.

== Education ==
In Breitenbach about 1,110 or (34.0%) of the population have completed non-mandatory upper secondary education, and 334 or (10.2%) have completed additional higher education (either university or a Fachhochschule). Of the 334 who completed tertiary schooling, 68.6% were Swiss men, 18.3% were Swiss women, 8.1% were non-Swiss men and 5.1% were non-Swiss women.

During the 2010-2011 school year there were a total of 283 students in the Breitenbach school system. The education system in the Canton of Solothurn allows young children to attend two years of non-obligatory Kindergarten. During that school year, there were 56 children in kindergarten. The canton's school system requires students to attend six years of primary school, with some of the children attending smaller, specialized classes. In the municipality there were 206 students in primary school and 21 students in the special, smaller classes. The secondary school program consists of three lower, obligatory years of schooling, followed by three to five years of optional, advanced schools. All the lower secondary students from Breitenbach attend their school in a neighboring municipality.

As of 2000, there were 213 students in Breitenbach who came from another municipality, while 131 residents attended schools outside the municipality.

Breitenbach is home to the Bibliothek Breitenbach library. The library has (as of 2008) 9,867 books or other media, and loaned out 38,249 items in the same year. It was open a total of 198 days with average of 13 hours per week during that year.
