= Woodbine =

Woodbine may refer to:

- Woodbine (plant), a common name for several plants

== Places ==
=== Australia ===
- Woodbine, New South Wales, a suburb of Sydney
- Woodbine, Queensland

=== Canada ===
- Woodbine, Calgary, Alberta, a neighbourhood

==== Toronto, Ontario ====
- Woodbine (electoral district), a provincial electoral district from 1926 to 1966
  - Beaches—Woodbine (provincial electoral district), a provincial electoral district from 1966 to 1996
  - Beaches—Woodbine, a federal electoral district now called Beaches—East York
- Woodbine Avenue, an arterial road
- Woodbine Beach, a beach
- Woodbine Race Course, later called Greenwood Raceway, a defunct horse racing facility
- Woodbine Racetrack, a horse racing facility
- Woodbine Centre, a shopping centre
- Woodbine station, subway station
- Woodbine, Old East York, a neighbourhood

=== United States ===
- Woodbine, Delaware
- Woodbine, Georgia
- Woodbine (New Albany, Indiana), a historic estate
- Woodbine, Illinois
- Woodbine, Iowa
- Woodbine, Kansas
- Woodbine, Kentucky
- Woodbine, Maryland
- Woodbine, New Jersey
- Woodbine, West Virginia
- Woodbine, Pennsylvania
- Woodbine, Texas
- Woodbine Formation, a Late Cretaceous geological formation in east Texas
- Woodbine Park, Los Angeles, California
- Woodbine Township, Jo Daviess County, Illinois

== People ==
- Bokeem Woodbine (born 1973), U.S. actor
- O'Brian Woodbine (born 1988), Jamaican soccer player
- Thomas Woodbine Hinchliff (1825–1882), British mountaineer
- Woodbine Parish (1796–1882), British diplomat
- Lord Woodbine (1929–2000), Trinidadian music producer

=== Characters ===
- Lazlo Woodbine, a fictional character created by Robert Rankin

== Other uses ==
- Woodbine (cigarette), a cigarette brand
- Woodbine Entertainment Group, operator of the Woodbine Racetrack, Toronto, Ontario, Canada
- USCGC Woodbine (WLB-289), a buoy tender of the United States Coast Guard
- USS Woodbine (1913), a ship of the U.S. Navy

== See also ==
- Woodbine Historic District (disambiguation)
- Woodbine Municipal Airport (disambiguation)
- Woodbine Schools (disambiguation)
- Wood (disambiguation)
- Bine (disambiguation)
