= Forch =

Mountain pass and village in Switzerland

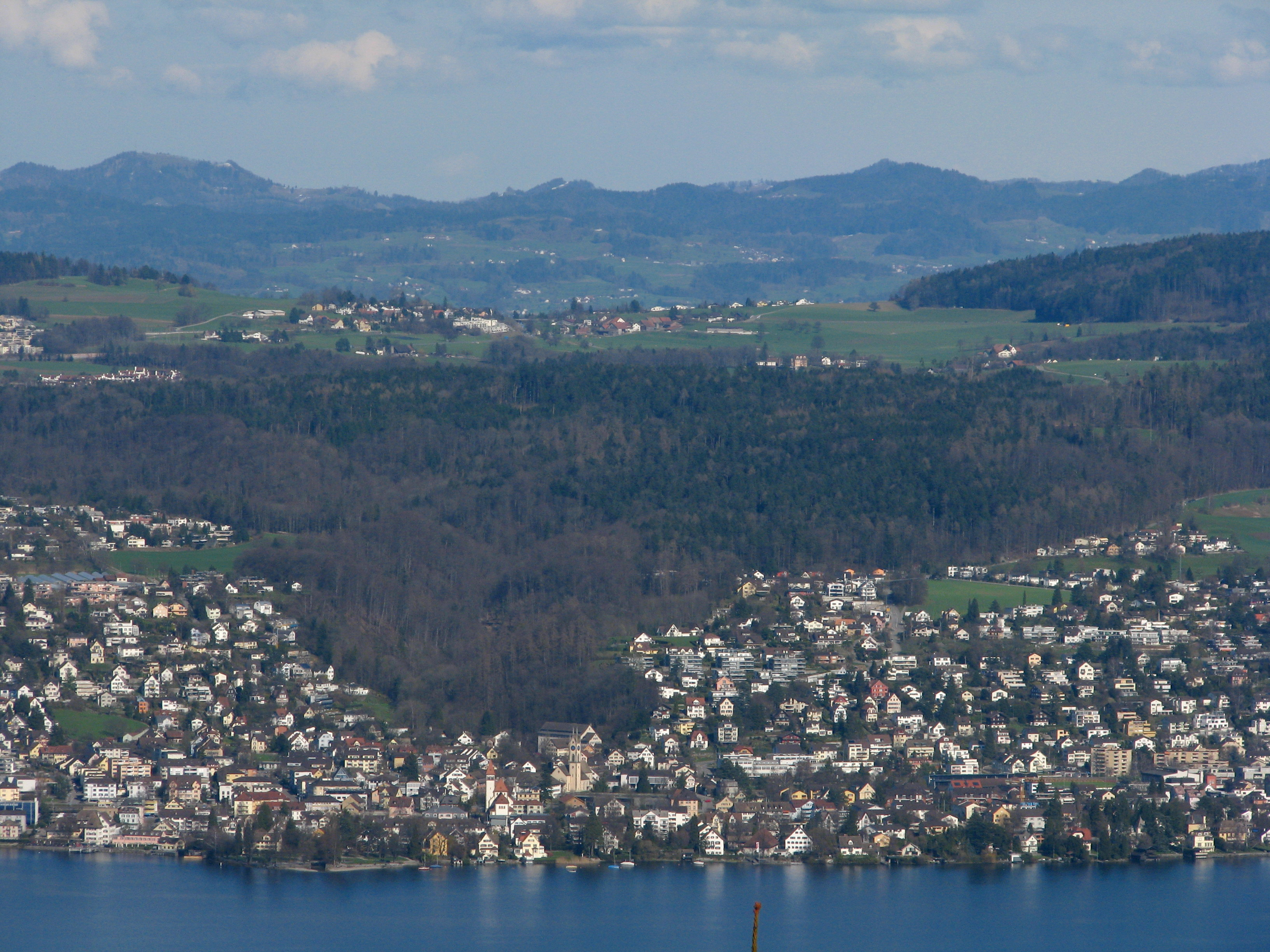
- Zürichsee, Küsnacht, Küsnachter Tobel valley and Forch as seen from nearby Felsenegg

- Location within Switzerland
- Elevation: 682 m (2,238 ft)
- Traversed by: Road

Third Approach
- Location: Canton of Zürich, Switzerland
- Range: Pfannenstiel (Zürich)
- Coordinates: 47°19.5′N 8°39.2′E

Forch is a village and a mountain pass (el. 682 m (2,238 ft)) located in the municipalities of Küsnacht and Maur in the canton of Zürich, Switzerland.

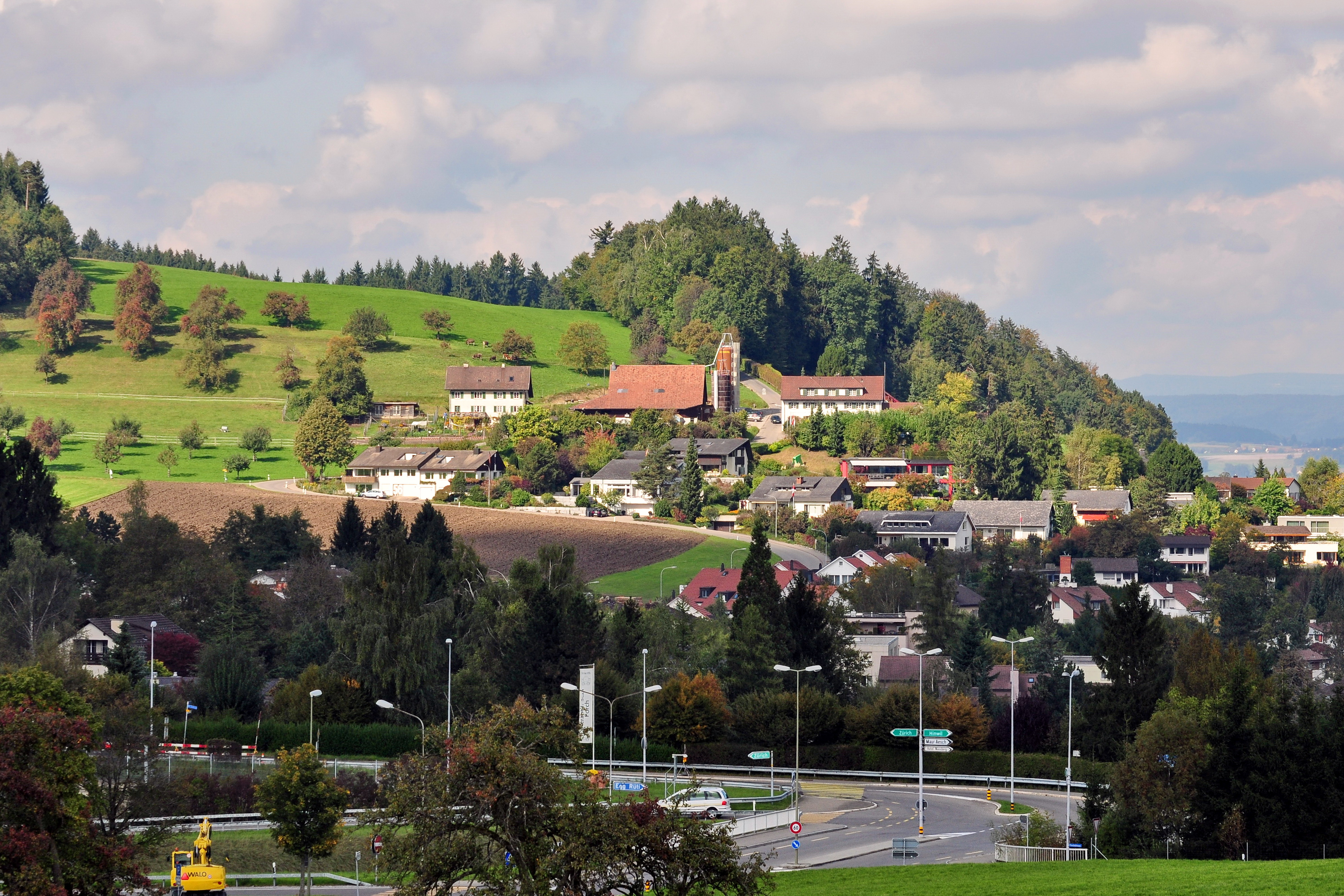
The village of Forch and Forchautobahn (highway), Maur and Glatt Valley to the right

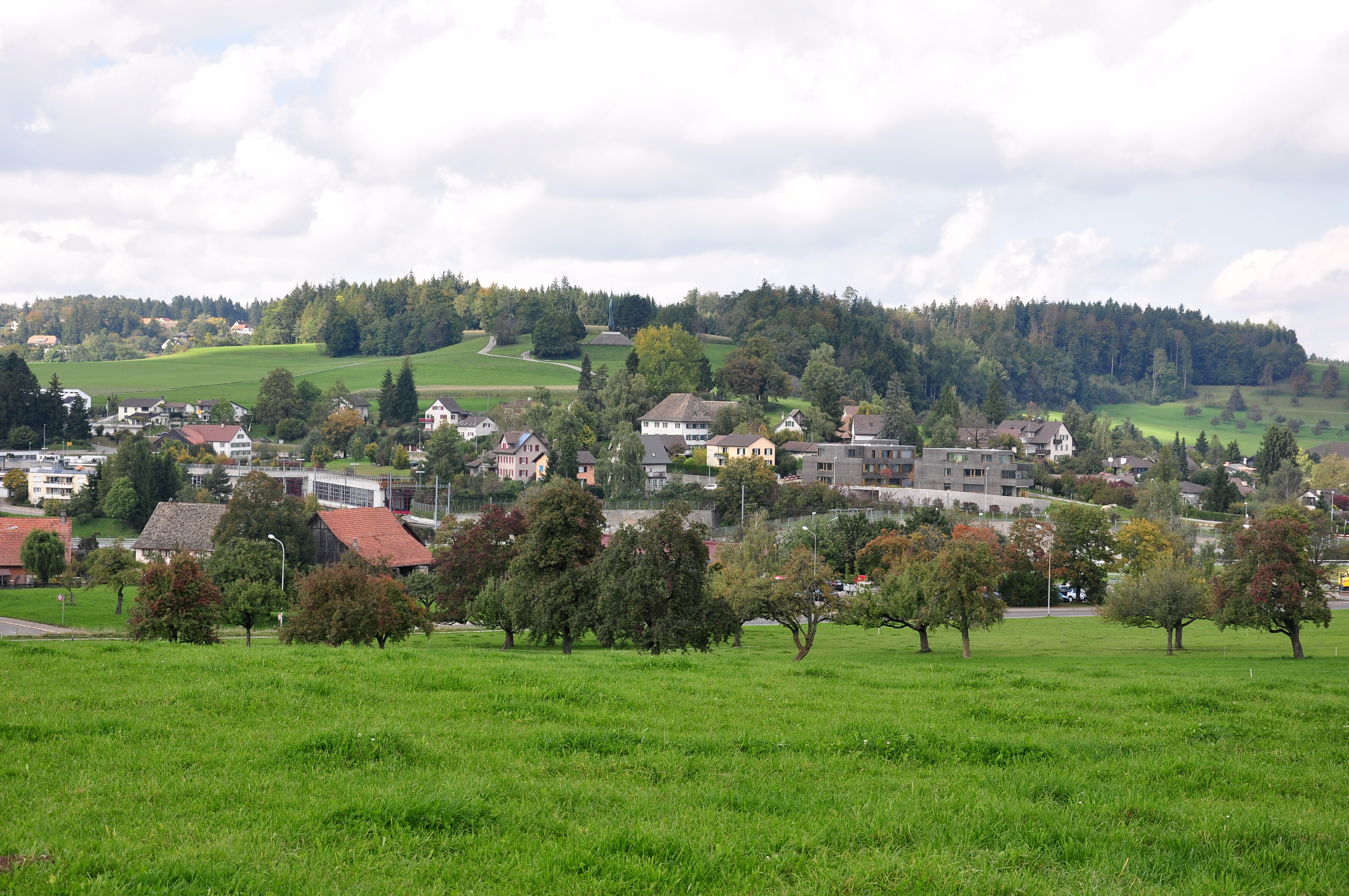
Forch, Forchbahn train station and Wehrmännerdenkmal to the right

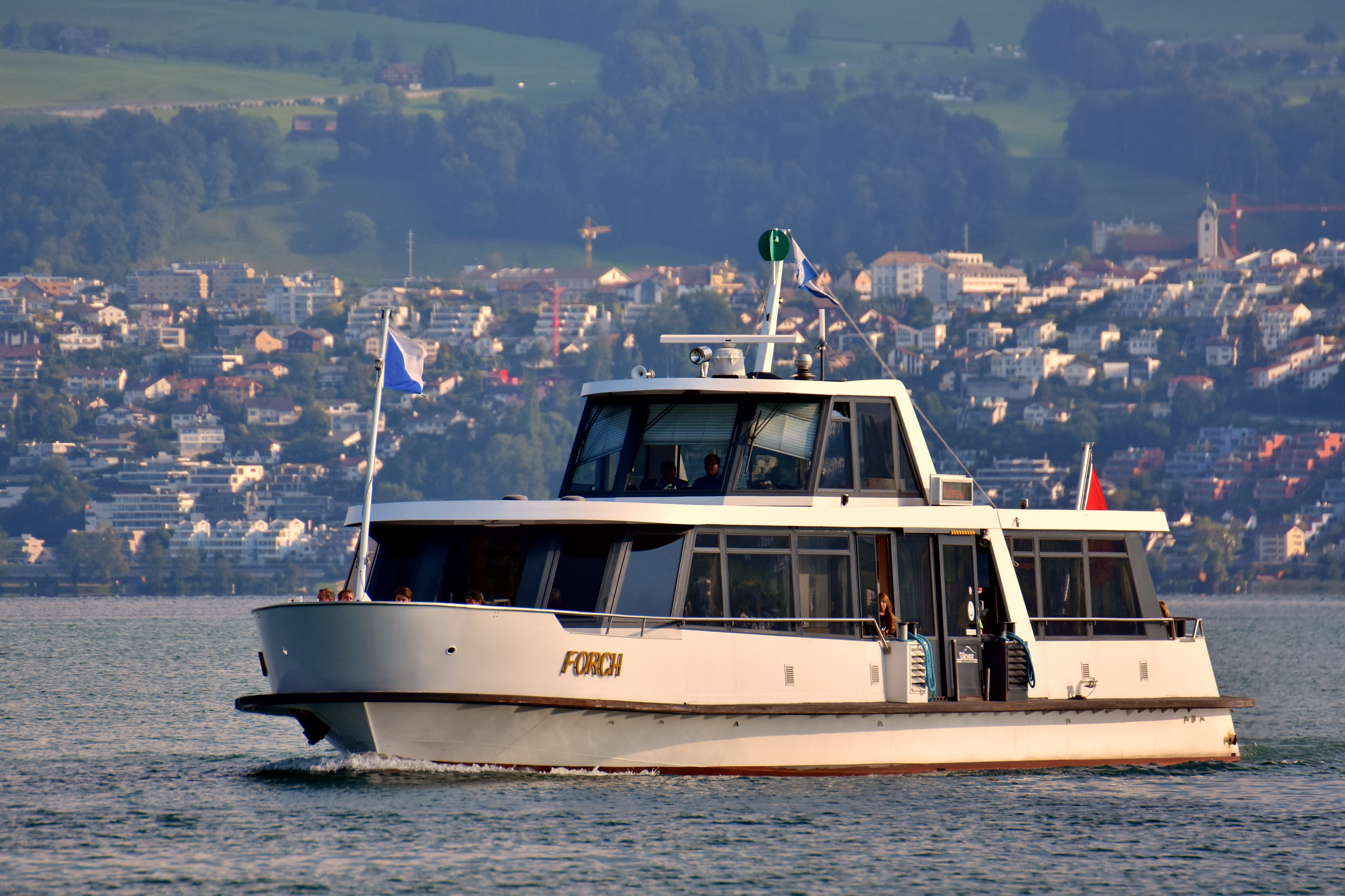
ZSG motor ship "Forch", Zimmerberg in the background

== Geography ==
Forch is located approximately 10 km (6.2 mi) in the southeast of Zürich, nearby Zumikon and Maur. It includes the hamlets Aesch and Scheuren (villages of the municipality Maur), and Kaltenstein in the east of the pass, Wangen and Neue Forch, which are villages of the municipality of Küsnacht. The forested hill called Guldenen on Pfannenstiel belongs to the Forch area, Hinter Guldenen to the municipality of Maur and Vorder Guldenen is part of the municipality of Egg.

The mountain pass named Forch connects Küsnacht on Lake Zürich and Maur on Greifensee respectively in the Glatt Valley. A monument called Wehrmännerdenkmal commemorating World War I is located nearby Neue Forch and Wassberg hill (el. 851 metres (2,792 ft)), which is also a popular recreation area for the people of the city of Zürich.

== Village of Forch ==
The population of the village of Forch is about 3,004 (as of 2013). The village has preserved its rural character. Since 1912, Forch is a stop of the Forchbahn, a trainway of the S-Bahn Zürich, between the Stadelhofen in Zürich and the municipality of Esslingen. Forch village is connected by the A52 highway to Zumikon (to the northwestwest) and Hinwil (to the southeast) heading to the Zürcher Oberland. Thus Forch is the biggest village within the municipality of Maur. Nevertheless, its infrastructure, apart from Kindergarten, primary school, small retail facilities and hospitality is modest, i.e. most infrastructure facilities are located in the surrounding villages, e.g. Egg and Maur.

== History ==
The tavern "Zur Krone" (crown) was built in 1783 on the summit of the Forch pass, 1836-1901 a horse's station, on the post route from Zürich to the municipality of Egg, which was in 1905 replaced by a bus line. Around 1900, a small settlement of eight houses was established, 12 years later the train station of the Forchbahn was built. The war memorial was built in 1922. Around 1960 the region became part of the growing agglomeration of the city of Zürich, and the villages of Forch, Scheuren and Aesch turned to an upscale residential district.

== Attractions ==
The main attractions on the northwestern slope of the primeval landscape of the Pfannenstiel area, there are sometimes rock slides occurring there, the last on 24 April 2013 when a 250-tonne (551,156 lb) boulder crashed on the pathway of the Küsnachter Tobel. Nevertheless, the pathway is very popular for hiking, usually starting in Forch and ending at the landing gate of the Zürichsee lake transportation company Zürichsee-Schifffahrtsgesellschaft (ZSG) in Küsnacht. Points of interest include the so-called Drachenhöhle towards the Wulp Castle besides the gorge: The literally Dragon's Den is a small cave that was washed out of the glacial Nagelfluh conglomerate. The so-called Dorfbach stream is also one of the most important spawning grounds for lake trout, although the number of spawning animals was as of 2013 very modest. Some glacial erratics respectively the so-called Findlingsgarten at the lower end of the gorge towards Küsnacht, as well as the idyllic landscape, are further points of attraction. Towards Küsnacht there are the local historical museum and the historical core of Küsnacht, located at the southern entrance of the ravine, and the early medieval Zehntenhaus granary on the lake shore landing gate, where the Forch and other motor ship of the Zürichsee-Schifffahrtsgesellschaft provide public transport between Rapperswil and Bürkliplatz in Zürich.

== Transport ==
Forch railway station lies within the village and is the principal intermediate station and headquarters of the Forchbahn (FB), which is operated as Zürich S-Bahn service S18 and provides links between Zürich-Stadelhofen and the village of Esslingen.

Aerial view (1950)

=== Bus Service ===
There are three frequent bus lines starting from the southernmost station in Forch, Scheuren. Two are headed north, for Klusplatz and Stettbach respectively, while the last one is bound south for Esslingen.

== Notable residents ==
- Ludwig Minelli (1932–2025), Swiss lawyer, founder of Dignitas
