= Aubin =

Aubin may refer to:

- Aubin (name), people with the given name or surname Aubin
- Aubin, Aveyron, France, a commune
- Aubin, Pyrénées-Atlantiques, France, a commune
- Aubin Codex, a textual and pictorial history of the Aztecs
- Aubin, Syria, a Syrian village in the Tartus Governorate

== See also ==
- Aubin blanc, a minor grape from Toul in Lorraine
- Aubin vert, a sibling of Chardonnay from Lorraine
- Aubin–Lions lemma, mathematical term
- Saint-Aubin (disambiguation)
