= Woodbine Historic District =

Woodbine Historic District may refer to:

in the United States

(by state)

- Woodbine Historic District (Woodbine, Georgia), listed on the NRHP in Georgia
- Woodbine (New Albany, Indiana), listed on the NRHP in Indiana
- Woodbine-Palmetto-Gates Historic District, New York, NY, listed on the NRHP in New York

== See also ==
- Woodbine (disambiguation)
