= Emmat railway station =

Railway station in Zurich, Switzerland

Emmat
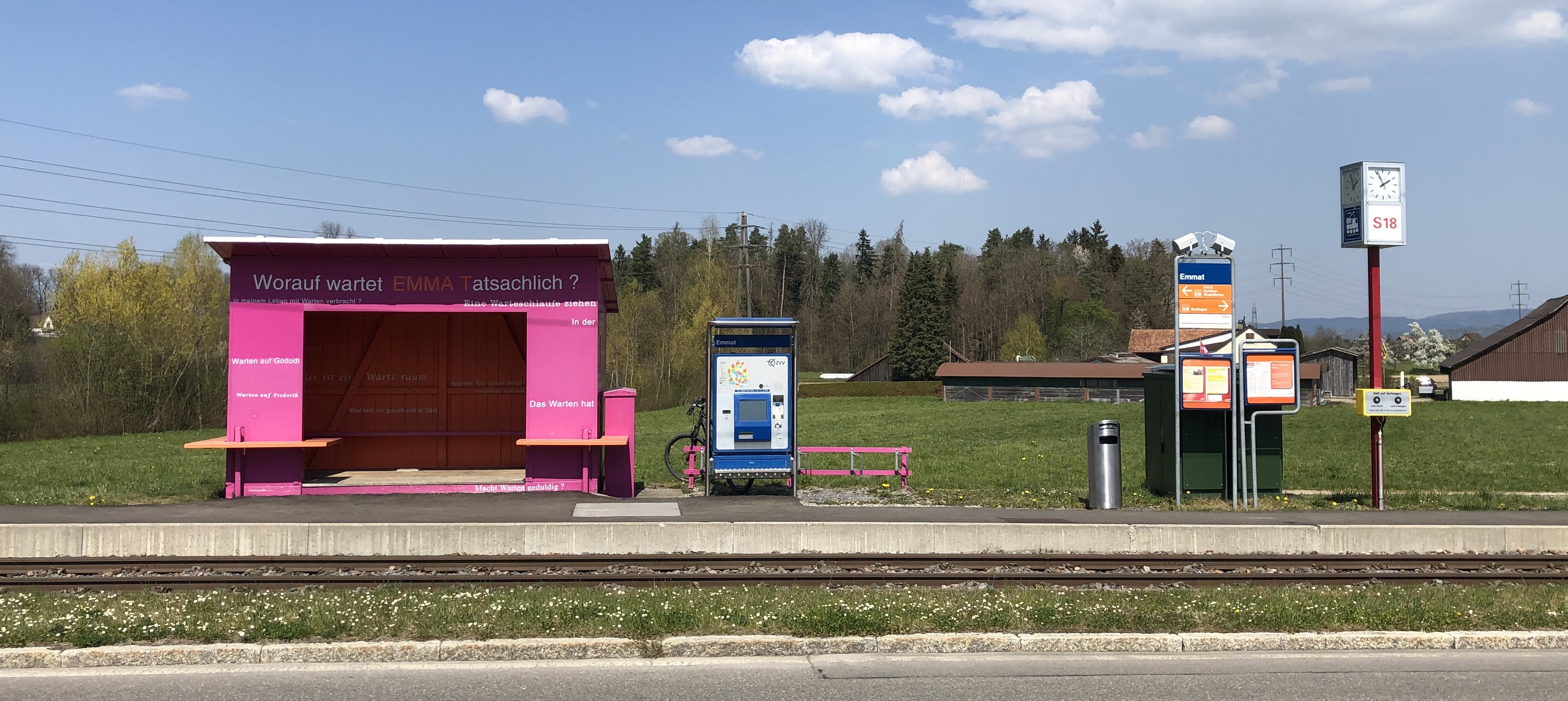
- Emmat railway station with its pink waiting shelter

General information
- Location: Egg; Switzerland
- Coordinates: 47.2924°N 8.7018°E
- Elevation: 516 m (1,693 ft)
- Owner: Forchbahn AG
- Operator: Forchbahn AG
- Line: Forch railway
- Platforms: 1
- Tracks: 1

Other information
- Fare zone: 130 (ZVV)

Services
Preceding station	Zurich S-Bahn	Following station
Langwies ZH towards Zürich Stadelhofen FB	S18	Esslingen Terminus
Location

Emmat is a railway station in the Canton of Zurich, Switzerland, in the municipality of Egg. It is served by the Forch railway, which operates as S18 on the Zurich S-Bahn network connecting Emmat to the city of Zurich. The station lies within zone 130 of the Zurich Transport Network (ZVV) and is operated by the Forchbahn AG.

== History ==
The station was opened along with the rest of the Forch railway on 29 November 1912.

In June 1999, the supervisory board of the Forchbahn AG decided to close Emmat with the timetable change in May 2000 due to low passenger numbers. The board estimated that the omission of the stop could save the ZVV SFr 110'000. Around that time, the board intended to introduce a fifteen-minute schedule during lunchtime, and sought to stabilize the timetable during peak hours by omitting Emmat. According to the board, the station had lost importance since the relocation of the nearby station Esslingen. The municipal council of Egg advocated for a postponement of the scheduled closing; in response the supervisory board announced in 2000 that the closing date would be postponed to the timetable change in December 2002. The board asked passengers of the region to demonstrate the need for Emmat until that deadline. In opposition to the proposed closing, the interest group IG Pro Emmat formed which successfully campaigned against the closing: The Forchbahn AG agreed to keep serving the station under the condition that the waiting shelter, which was in poor condition at the time, be renovated. The characteristic pink-orange paintwork of the shelter is the result of a competition which the IG Pro Emmat held in response. 45 phrases centered around the theme of waiting were painted on the shelter. In 2001 the Forchbahn AG manager Fritz Heiniger announced that the closure of the station was definitely canceled.

The station was renovated beginning in March 2021 to make it accessible: along the entire length of the station, the platform was raised by 15 cm (6 in) to allow for step-free boarding/alighting. It was also widened to 2.6 m (8.5 ft). In addition, the platform was extended by 8 m (26 ft) towards Egg and an access ramp was installed. The platform was fitted with tactile indicators for visually impaired passengers. The renovation was completed earlier than scheduled and the station returned to service in May.

== Services ==
The station is served by Zurich S-Bahn line S18, which operates between Zurich and Esslingen. As of the December 2025 timetable change, the following services call at Emmat:

- S18 Zürich Stadelhofen–Zürich Rehalp–Forch–Esslingen: half-hourly service

The service frequency increases to every fifteen minutes during peak hours. The station is a request stop. With around fifty passengers per day, the station is the least frequented station of the Zurich S-Bahn network as of 2013.
