= Stadler (surname) =

Stadler is a German surname. Notable people with the surname include:

- Achim Stadler (1961–2022), German cyclist
- Alexander Stadler (born 1999), German field hockey player
- Alexey Stadler (born 1991), Russian cellist
- Andreas Stadler (weightlifter) (1896–1941), Austrian weightlifter
- Andreas Stadler (political scientist) (born 1965), Austrian diplomat and political scientist
- Andrew Stadler (born 1988), American football (soccer) player
- Anton Stadler (1753–1812), Austrian clarinet and basset horn player
- Arnold Stadler (born 1954), German writer
- Charles A. Stadler (1848–1928), American politician
- Clarissa Stadler (born 1966), Austrian journalist, moderator and writer
- Craig Stadler (born 1953), American golfer
- Ernst Stadler (1883–1914), German poet
- Ewald Stadler (born 1961), Austrian politician
- Ferdinand Stadler (1813–1870), Swiss architect
- Franz Stadler (1913–2000), German association official at ADAC
- Friedrich Stadler (born 1951), Austrian historian
- Gary Stadler, American new-age pianist
- Hans Stadler (1875–1962), German physician and naturalist
- Heiner Stadler (1942–2018), German jazz musician
- Hermann Stadler (born 1961), Austrian football (soccer) player
- Jack Stadler (?–2010), American philanthropist
- Joachim Stadler (born 1970), German football (soccer) player
- Johann Rudolf Stadler (1605–1637), Swiss clock-maker
- Johann Stadler (1755–1804), Austrian clarinet and basset horn player
- John Evangelist Stadler (1804–1868), German hagiographer
- Joseph Stadler (1880–1950), American athlete
- Josip Stadler (1843–1918), Croatian priest
- Kevin Stadler (born 1980), American golfer
- Lewis Stadler (1896–1954), American geneticist
- Lukas Stadler (born 1990), Austrian footballer
- Normann Stadler (born 1973), German triathlete
- Matthew Stadler (born 1959), American writer
- Max Stadler (1949–2013), German politician
- Maximilian Stadler (1748–1833), Austrian composer
- Monika Stadler (born 1963), Austrian harpist
- Nina Stadler (born 1995), Swiss tennis player
- Pater Karl Stadler (1921–2012), Swiss Benedictine monk and artist
- Phyllis Stadler Lyon, American field hockey player
- Ralf Stadler (born 1964), German politician
- René Stadler (born 1940), Swiss bobsledder
- Roland Stadler (born 1959), Swiss tennis player
- Rupert Stadler (born 1963), German businessman
- Sergei Stadler (1962–2026), Russian violinist and conductor
- Simon Stadler (born 1983), German tennis player
- Simon Stadler (politician) (born 1988), Swiss politician
- Svenja Stadler (born 1979), German politician
- Sylvester Stadler (1910–1995), Austrian military officer serving Nazi Germany
- Tanja Stadler (born 1981), German mathematician
- Tereza Štadler (1936–2001), Yugoslav chess player
- Thorben Stadler (born 1990), German footballer
- Wolf Stadler (born 1947), German sailor

== See also ==
- Stadler Rail
