= Byne =

Byne may refer to:

== People ==
- John Byne (1635–1661), English landowner and politician
- John Byne Skerrett (1777–1814), British soldier
- Mildred Stapley Byne (1875-1941), American art historian

== Places ==
- Byne House, England

== Other ==
- Byne's disease

== See also ==
- Byrne, a surname
- Bynes, a surname
- Bine (disambiguation)
