= Bine (name) =

Bine is a Slovene masculine given name, a diminutive of Albin. The feminine counterpart is "Bina", derived form "Albina". Notable people with the name include:

- Bine Prepelič (born 5 August 2001) is a Slovenian professional basketball player
- Bine Rogelj (1929–2023), Slovene ski jumper

== See also ==
- Bina#Given name
