= Albin (given name) =

- Gender: Male
- Language: Latin

Origin
- Meaning: "white", "bright"

Other names
- See also: Aubin, Albina, Albinas

Albin is a masculine Polish, Scandinavian, German, French, Albanian, and Slovenian given name, from the Roman cognate Albinus, derived from the Latin albus, meaning "white" or "bright". This name may also be a last name. In Estonia, France, Hungary, Poland, Slovakia, and Sweden, March 1 is Albin's name day. There are variant spellings, including Albinas, a male given name in Lithuania; Aubin, a French masculine given name; and Albina, an Ancient Roman, Albanian, Czech, Galician, Italian, Polish, Slovak, and Slovenian feminine given name. Albin is uncommon as a surname.

Notable people with the given name Albin include:

- Albin Alex (1995-), Indian-American engineer
- Albin of Brechin (died 1269), Scottish bishop
- Albin Boija (born 2003), Swedish ice hockey player
- Albín Brunovský (1935–1997), Slovak painter, graphic artist, lithographer, illustrator and pedagogue
- Albin Dunajewski (1817–1894), Polish political activist and Bishop of Kraków
- Albin Ebondo (b. 1984), French footballer
- Albin Egger-Lienz (1868–1926), Austrian painter
- Albin Ekdal (born 1989), Swedish footballer
- Albin Eser (1935–2023), German jurist and an ad litem judge
- Albin Granlund (b. 1989), Finnish footballer
- Albin Grau (1884–1942), German artist, architect and occultist, and the producer and production designer for F.W. Murnau's film Nosferatu
- Albin Gutman (b. 1947), Slovenian general
- Albin Haller (1849–1925), French chemist
- Albin Julius (1967–2022), Austrian martial music and industrial artist
- Albin Killat (b. 1961), German diver
- Albin Kitzinger (1912–1970), German footballer
- Albin Köbis (1892–1917), German sailor
- Albin Kurti (b. 1975), Prime Minister of Kosovo
- Albin Lermusiaux (1874–1940), French Olympic shooter
- Albin Polasek (1879–1965), Czech-American sculptor and educator
- Albin Provosty (1865–1932), American politician
- Albin W. Norblad (1939–2014), American judge
- Albin Nyamoya (1924–2001), Prime Minister of Burundi
- Albin Roussin (1781–1854), French admiral and statesman
- Albin F. Schoepf (1822–1886), Polish-born American military officer
- Albin Schram (1926–2005) Czech collector of autograph letters by shapers of world history
- Albin Starc (1916–2011), Croatian World War II pilot
- Albin Stenroos (1889–1971), Finnish Olympic winner of the marathon race
- Albin Ström (1892–1962), Swedish socialist politician
- Albin Sandqvist, Swedish electronic and dance pop singer known by the mononym Albin, a member of the Swedish pop band Star Pilots
- Albin Tingwall (born 2003), Swedish singer
- Albin Vidović (1943–2018), Croatian Olympic handballer
- Albin Zollinger (1895–1941), Swiss writer

== See also ==
- The name Brfxxccxxmnpcccclllmmnprxvclmnckssqlbb11116, pronounced Albin, given by Swedish parents to their child as protest against Sweden's infant naming laws
