= A52 motorway (Switzerland) =

Motorway in Switzerland

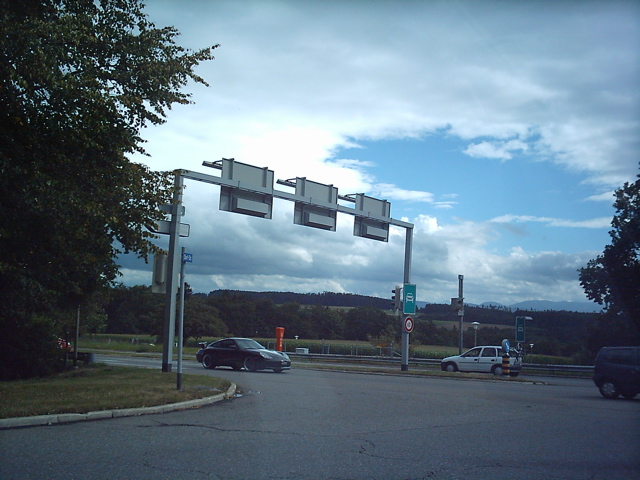
The A52 at the Zumikon starting point

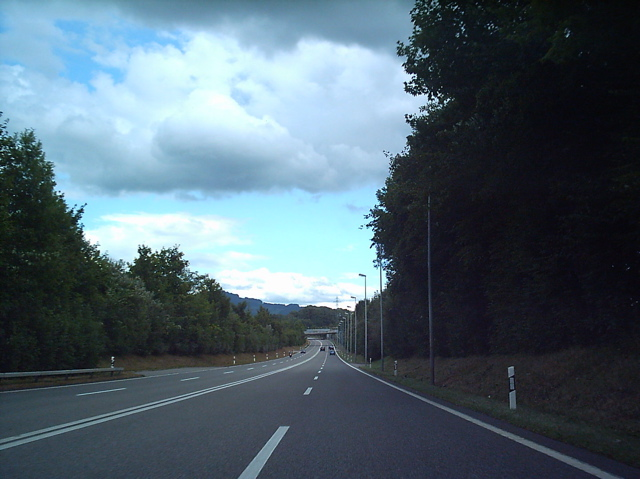
The A52 expressway

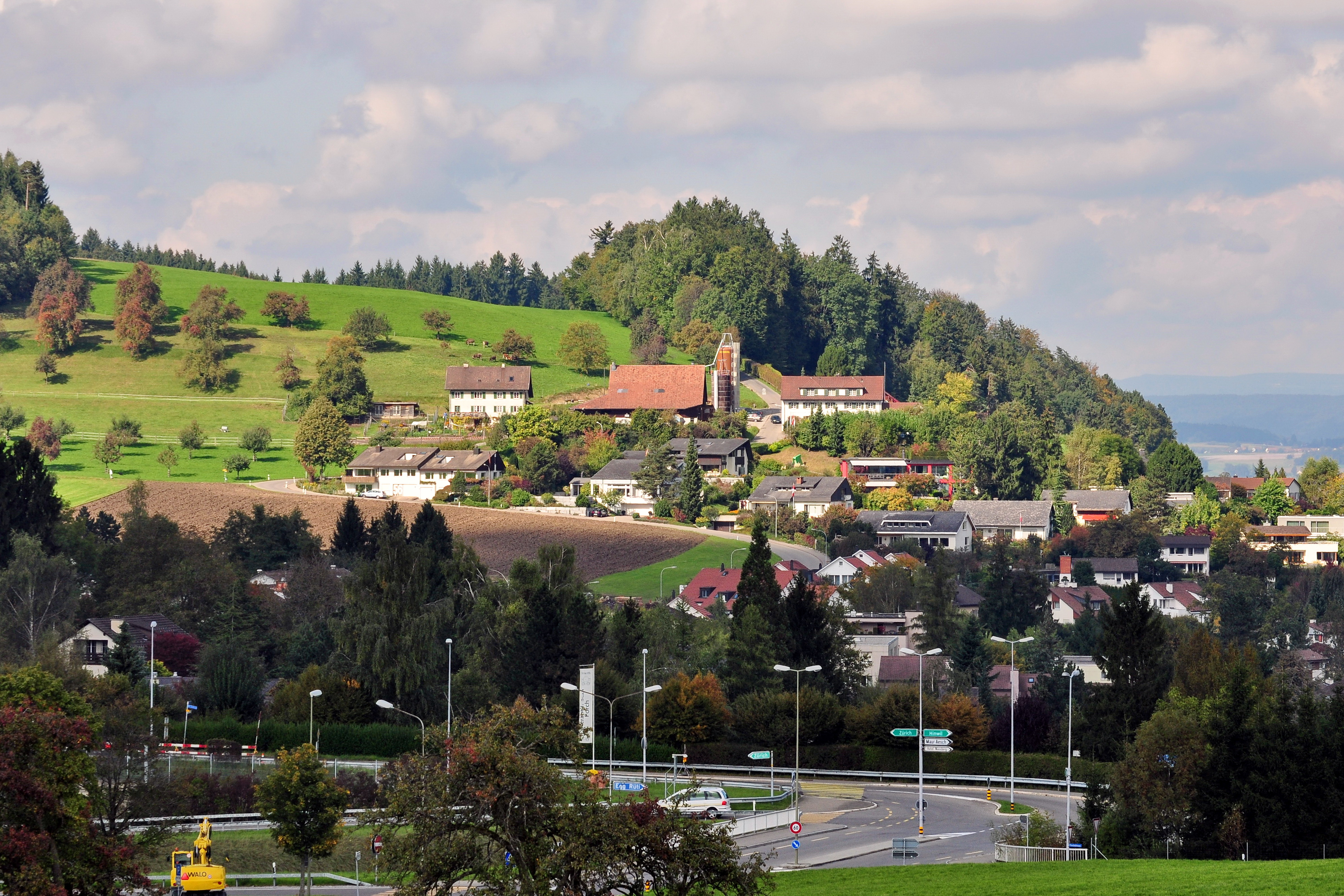
The village of Forch and Forchautobahn, Maur and Glatt Valley to the right

The A52 is a main road (German: Autostrasse) (American English: Expressway) connecting Zumikon in the canton of Zürich with Hinwil and Rapperswil-Jona in the canton of St. Gallen.

== Route ==
The A52 starts out from the intersection with Zumikon and Küsnacht. It passes through Zumikon and Forch before heading for Egg, Esslingen and finally Hinwil. Near Hinwil, there is a huge expressway-class roundabout with three different roads connecting to Rapperswil-Jona, Hinwil and again back to Zumikon and Forch. It finishes in Rüthi and Jona SG.

An Autostrasse is the Swiss equivalent of a major rural British "A" road. Portions of the road are nearly like a motorway or American expressway (without the central reservation) with very shjhort entrance and exit sliproads (ramps), with two lanes going in each direction, making it four in all. Possibly due to this, the road is often surprisingly smooth to travel on.

The A52 is also referred to as the Forchstrasse (Forch Road) as it is a continuation of the Forchstrasse in a main road form.

It runs in a southeast-to-east direction before the Hinwil crossing, continuing south toward Rapperswil after the intersection.

Main route: Zumikon - Forch - Egg - Esslingen - Hinwil - Rüthi - Rapperswil

== Restrictions ==
Speed limit: 60 km/h (37 mph) at start in Zumikon, then 80 km/h (50 mph) and progressively 100 km/h (62 mph). The Hinwil roundabout has a speed limit of 80 km/h.

Tolls: no toll/vignette required.
