= Inter-Community School Zurich =

ICS Inter-Community School Zürich

Location
- Strubenacher 3, 8126; Zumikon; Switzerland
- 47.3380°N 8.6223°E

Information
- Type: Independent, International School, Non-profit, Private, Day School
- Established: 18 March 1960
- Status: Non-profit Foundation governed by a Board of Trustees
- Head of school: Gabriel Di Mauro (Interim)
- Faculty: c. 180
- Grades: Nursery; Preschool & kindergarten; Primary school; Middle school; Secondary school; Diploma programme
- Age range: 18 months to 18 years
- Enrollment: c. 830
- Language: English
- Campus: Single Campus, Zumikon
- Student Union/Association: Primary Student Council; Secondary Student Council
- Colours: Orange, grey
- Athletics: ICS Athletics Programme; The International School Sports League (ISSL); Swiss Group of International Schools (SGIS); Sports Council of International Schools (SCIS)
- Accreditation: International Baccalaureate Organization (IBO); Council of International Schools (CIS); New England Association of Schools and Colleges (NEASC)
- Newspaper: ICS Weekly Bulletin; ICS Connections Magazine; ICS World Alumni Magazine
- Yearbook: ICS Yearbook
- Website: www.icsz.ch

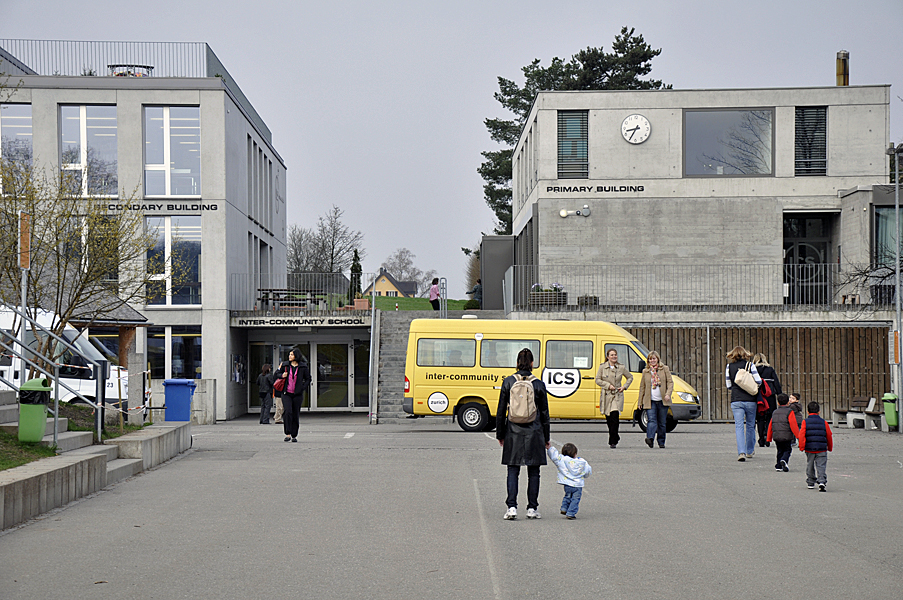
ICS in Zumikon

The Inter-Community School Zurich (ICS or ICSZ) is a private, independent, international, co-educational day school and offers a comprehensive educational programme in English for children from ages of 3 to 18. The school is international in character and welcomes students of all nationalities. Since 1971, the Inter-Community School has been located in Zumikon near Zurich, Switzerland. It has been an International Baccalaureate World School since 1993.

ICS's Kindergarten and Primary education programmes (Primary School) are approved by the bureau for elementary school (Volksschulamt), administration for education (Bildungsdirektion), canton of Zurich.

Also ICS's lower Secondary education programme (Secondary School, Grades 6 to 8, and Grade 9) is approved as Sekundarstufe by the bureau for elementary school (Volksschulamt), administration for education (Bildungsdirektion), canton of Zurich.

However ICS's upper Secondary education programme (Secondary School, Grades 10 to 12) is neither approved as a Mittelschule by the bureau for secondary and vocational education (Mittelschul- und Berufsbildungsamt), administration of education (Bildungsdirektion), canton of Zurich, and nor approved by the Swiss Federal State Secretariat for Education, Research and Innovation SERI.

== History ==
=== 1960–1969 ===
The Inter-Community School Zurich was founded on March 18, 1960, at a meeting at the Hotel Carlton Elite between the American, Australian, British and Canadian communities of Zurich. The school enrolled 84 students aged 4–13 during its first semester at the Hotel Rigiblick. There were five staff members employed at the time as well as the founder Gerald Atkinson and his wife.

In May 1961, ICS signed a lease with the city of Zurich for the rental of a lakeside villa (which in the 1930s had been renovated for use by Prince Paul of Yugoslavia) In September of that year, ICS began its second year of operation in the new villa with 160 students enrolled.

By 1967, there were 200 students enrolled from kindergarten to seventh grade with two classes per grade. Rooms were in short supply, therefore facility was found in Regensdorf. Shortly thereafter, the upper primary classes were moved to Regensdorf, while the lower primary classes remained in the lakeside villa on Seefeldquai. The search for one facility to house the entire school was now underway.

The founder of ICS Gerald Atkinson relinquished his ownership of the school in 1968, to facilitate the process of ICS gaining the legal non-profit foundation status. This non-profit foundation status would make it easier to raise funds for the purchasing of a new building. On August 1, 1968, the Foundation of The Inter-Community School was established under the Swiss Civil Code.

=== 1970–1986 ===
In early 1970 the municipality of Dübendorf, a suburb near Zurich, had just completed the construction of a new primary school, but only required half of the rooms. ICS was offered the use of the other half of the building for one year, while another more permanent location was sought. In April 1970, the lower primary classes moved out of the lakeside villa in Zurich to the new temporary facility in Dübendorf. The upper primary classes remained in Regensdorf during this period.

At the same time, the board of trustees had found a farmer in Zumikon who was willing to sell ICS some of his land. The contract for the purchase was signed in November 1970. After receiving two major loans from Credit Suisse and the Union Bank of Switzerland, ICS was ready to build its own facility. Construction began in November 1971 and was completed in December 1972. When the winter term began in 1973, the entire school was under one roof - this was the Primary School building. 270 students were now enrolled at ICS. In 1977 additional land was purchased, and extensions to the Primary School building were done in 1979 and 1982. Shortly thereafter in 1985, a library and kindergarten were built.

The 1974 'Brink Report' by the Board of Trustees formulated plans for the development of a secondary school at ICS. The first pavilion was erected in 1987 as the first secondary school classroom.

== Academics ==
The medium of instruction is English, but all children above Kindergarten must study German.
