= Albinas =

- Gender: Male
- Language: Lithuanian
- Name day: 1 March

Origin
- Region of origin: Lithuania

Other names
- Related names: Albin

Albinas is a Lithuanian masculine given name. People bearing the name Albinas include:

- Albinas Albertynas (1934–2005), Lithuanian politician
- Albinas Elskus (1926–2007), Lithuanian painter
- Albinas Januška (born 1960), Lithuanian politician
