= Esslingen, Switzerland =

Village in the municipality of Egg, Switzerland

Coordinates: 47°17′N 8°43′E

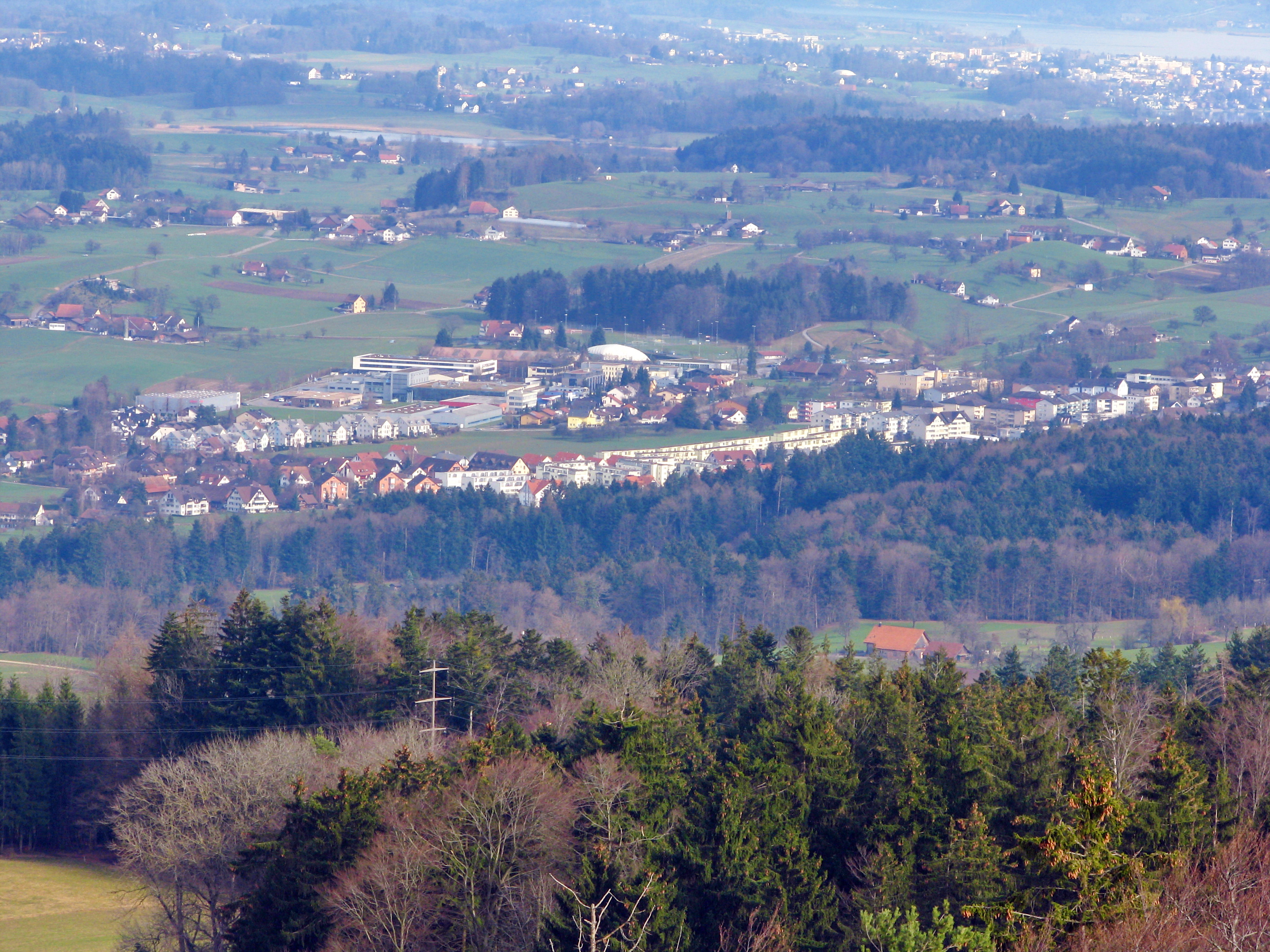
Esslingen as seen from Pfannenstiel (March 2010)

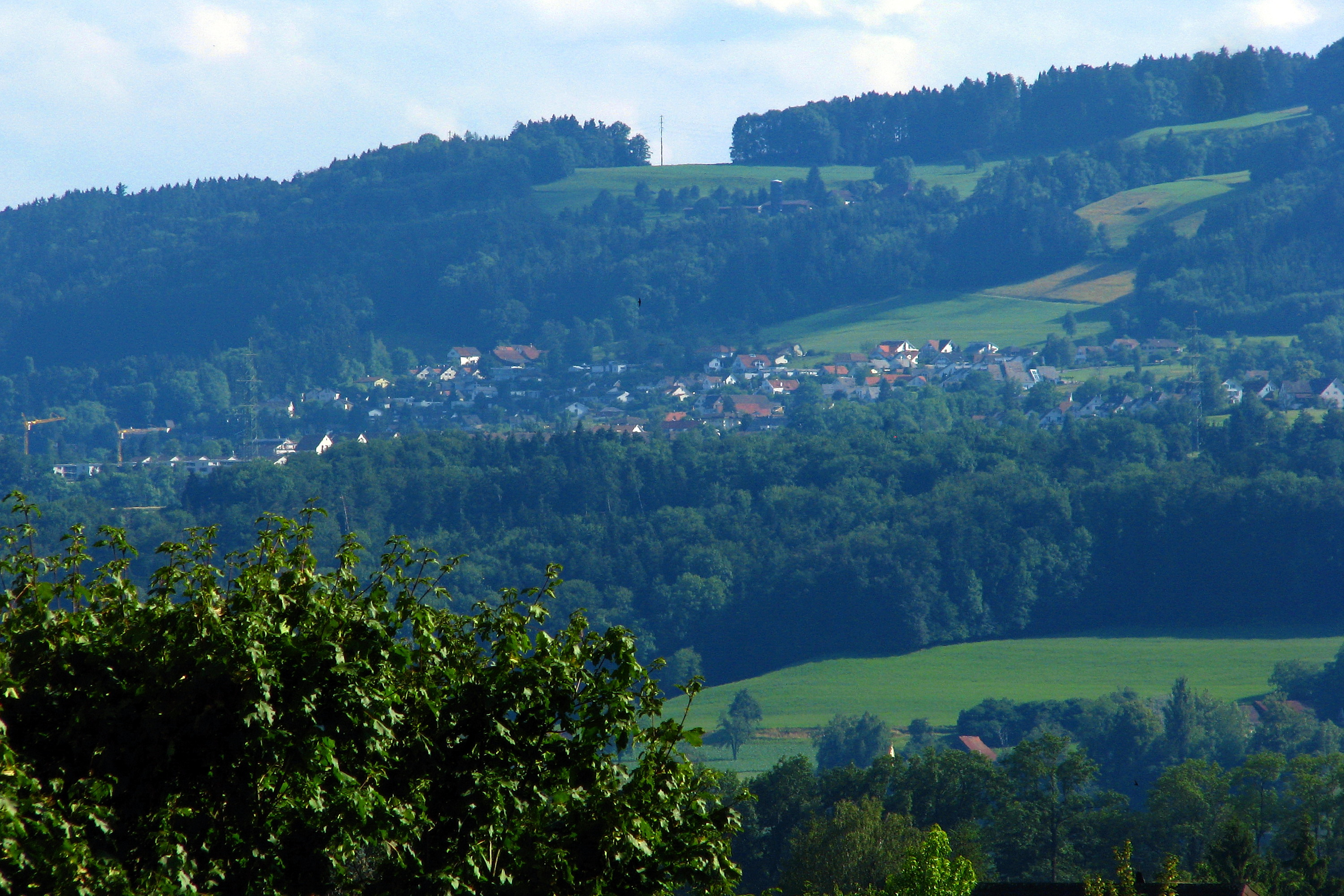
Esslingen as seen from Uster, Pfannenstiel in the background (June 2009)

Esslingen (German pronunciation: [ˈɛslɪŋən]) is a village in the municipality of Egg, Switzerland, in the canton of Zürich. It is located in the Pfannenstiel region, approximately 15 km (9 mi) southeast of Zürich. In the local dialect it is called Esslinge.

The population is 1,752 (as of 2012).

== Transport ==
Esslingen railway station is the terminus of the Forchbahn, a tram-train service from the city of Zürich that is also known as service S18 of the Zürich S-Bahn. The town is also served by buses on route 842 of the Verkehrsbetriebe Zürichsee und Oberland, which links Uster and Oetwil am See.

Esslingen is connected by the Autostrasse A52 to Zumikon and Hinwil.
