= Pater Karl Stadler =

Swiss Benedictine monk and artist

Pater Karl Stadler (March 7, 1921 – June 17, 2012), born Paul Stadler, was a Swiss Benedictine monk and artist who lived and worked in the Engelberg Abbey in the Canton of Obwalden, Switzerland. Pater Karl is best known for his works of art depicting biblical themes. His paintings, murals, and stained glass windows are on view in churches, monasteries, and public sites across Switzerland.

== Life ==
Paul Stadler was raised in Rorschacherberg, Switzerland, above Lake Constance. He entered the Stiftsschule Engelberg in 1934 and joined the Benedictine order at Engelberg Abbey in 1942, taking the monastic name Karl. After studying theology, Pater Karl attended the Hochschule für Gestaltung und Kunst in Basel before returning to Engelberg in 1951, where he taught drawing and aesthetics at the Stiftsschule until 1996. Throughout his life at Engelberg Abbey, he created art in his attic atelier.

== Work ==
For over sixty years, Pater Karl Stadler sustained a practice across the mediums of painting, sculpture, stained glass, printmaking, murals, and photography. His public commissions include the cross and painted ceiling panels in the Schwand Chapel near Engelberg (1951), the stained-glass windows and tabernacle in the baptistery of St. Anthony's Church in Lucerne (1954), the stained-glass window, altar and tabernacle of St. Anna Chapel on Wädenswiler Berg (1959), the relief, stained-glass windows, altar, cross, and tabernacle in the Benedictine Monastery Maria-Rickenbach (1961,1962,1963,1966,1967, 1974, 1980, 1981, 1987, 1989), the mural, stained-glass windows and tabernacle in the former chapel of the abbey laundry building (now the High School for Sports) (1962), the 24 biblical scenes in stained-glass in St. Andrew's Benedictine Abbey in Sarnen (1964), the mural and the stained-glass windows in the church of the Benedictine Abbey Marienburg in Wikon (1965), the stained-glass windows of St. Felix and Regula Church in Wattwil (1968) and those of Holy Cross Chapel in Grafenort (1971), the stained-glass windows in the side chapel of the Franciscan Church in Lucerne (1973), the stained-glass windows, mural, altar, and tabernacle of the chapel in the regional retirement and nursing home "Solino" in Bütschwil (1978), the stained-glass windows and murals in the indoor pool of the Stiftsschule Engelberg (1979), the murals in the Sportanlage "Breite" in Bütschwil (1980), the stained-glass windows in the Gothic choir of Santa Chatrigna in Zuoz (1982), the murals in the former prayer room of Schwyz Hospital (1984–85), the stained-glass windows, tabernacle and crucifix in the Erlenhaus Chapel in Engelberg (1987), the panel paintings of the village church in Ueberstorf (1988), the chapel of the Mission House Maria Hilf in Steinhausen (1989), the stained-glass windows and murals in the Chapel of St. Theodul (St. Joder) near Menzberg (1990), the murals and tabernacle at Haus Maria Frieden, the AIDS hospice of the Franciscan nuns in Oberharmersbach, Germany (1990), the murals in the dining room and crypt of the Benedictine Convent Church in Maria-Rickenbach (1993,1997), as well as stained-glass windows in the baptistry and the nave paintings in the transept of the sanctuary of St. Anthonius Church in Egg (1996–97).

Pater Karl Stadler's extensive travels through Greece, Turkey, Italy and France informed his work. From 1965 – 2004, he served as the editor of the Titlisgrüsse, the quarterly magazine of the Abbey and Stiftsschule Engelberg.

From December 2013 – April 2014, the Tal Museum Engelberg staged an exhibition of Pater Karl's black and white photographs of the Engelberg mountain world and its people titled Die Schönheit des Einfachen [The Beauty of Simplicity].
