= Albina (given name) =

- Pronunciation: ahl-BEE-nah
- Gender: Female
- Language: Latin

Origin
- Meaning: "white", "bright"

Other names
- See also: Albinus, Albin, Aubin

Albina (ahl-BEE-nah) is a feminine given name from the Roman cognate Albinus, derived from the Latin albus, meaning "white" or "bright". There are masculine variants including Albin in Albania, Kosovo, Poland, Scandinavia, and Slovenia; and Aubin in France. In Estonia, France, Hungary, Poland, Slovakia, and Sweden 1 March is Albina's Name day. Albina is uncommon as a surname. People with the given name Albina include:

- Albina Akhatova (born 1976), Russian biathlete
- Albina Borisova (born 1952), Yakut writer and translator
- Albina du Boisrouvray (born 1941), French former journalist and film producer who has become a global philanthropist and social entrepreneur
- Albina Dzhanabaeva (born 1979), Kazakh-Russian singer, soloist of popular Ukrainian/Russian group VIA-GRA
- Albina Grčić (born 1999), Croatian singer
- Albina Guarnieri (born 1953), Canadian politician
- Albina Kamaletdinova (born 1969), Tajik Olympic archer
- Albina Kelmendi (born 1998), Albanian singer
- Albina Mali (1925–2001), Slovenian Yugoslav Partisans member
- Albina Osipowich (1911–1964), American-Lithuanian two-time Olympic Gold Medal winner
- Albina Shagimuratova (born 1979), Tatar-Russian operatic soprano

== See also ==
- Albina (disambiguation)
