= Woodbine Schools =

Woodbine Schools or variation, may refer to:

- Woodbine Middle School, Toronto, Ontario, Canada; the junior high school division of Georges Vanier Secondary School
- Woodbine Normal and Grade School, Woodbine, Iowa, USA
- Woodbine Community School District, Woodbine, Iowa, USA
- Woodbine School District, Woodbine New Jersey, USA

== See also ==
- Woodbine (disambiguation)
