= Pfannenstiel (Zürich) =

Mountain in Switzerland

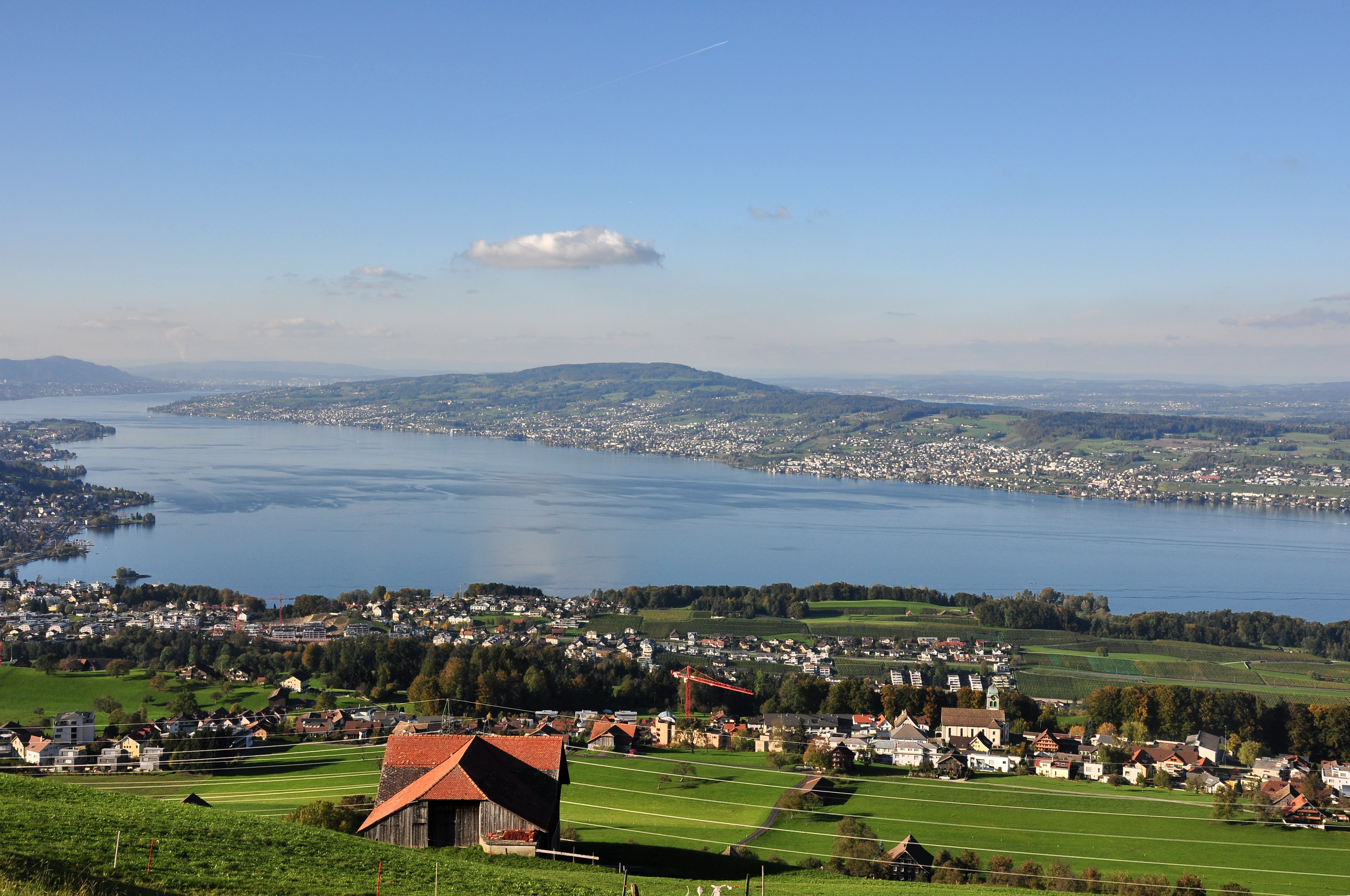
- Pfannenstiel (background centre) and Lake Zürich from the Etzel

Highest point
- Elevation: 853 m (2,799 ft)
- Prominence: 333 m (1,093 ft)
- Parent peak: Tweralpspitz
- Isolation: 10.2 km (6.3 mi)
- Coordinates: 47°17′30″N 8°40′17″E

Geography
- Location within Switzerland
- Location: Zürich, Switzerland

Pfannenstiel (German pronunciation: [ˈpfanənˌʃtiːl]; el. 853 metres (2,799 ft)) is a wooded mountain respectively a region overlooking the Lake Zürich and Zürcher Oberland in the canton of Zürich in Switzerland.

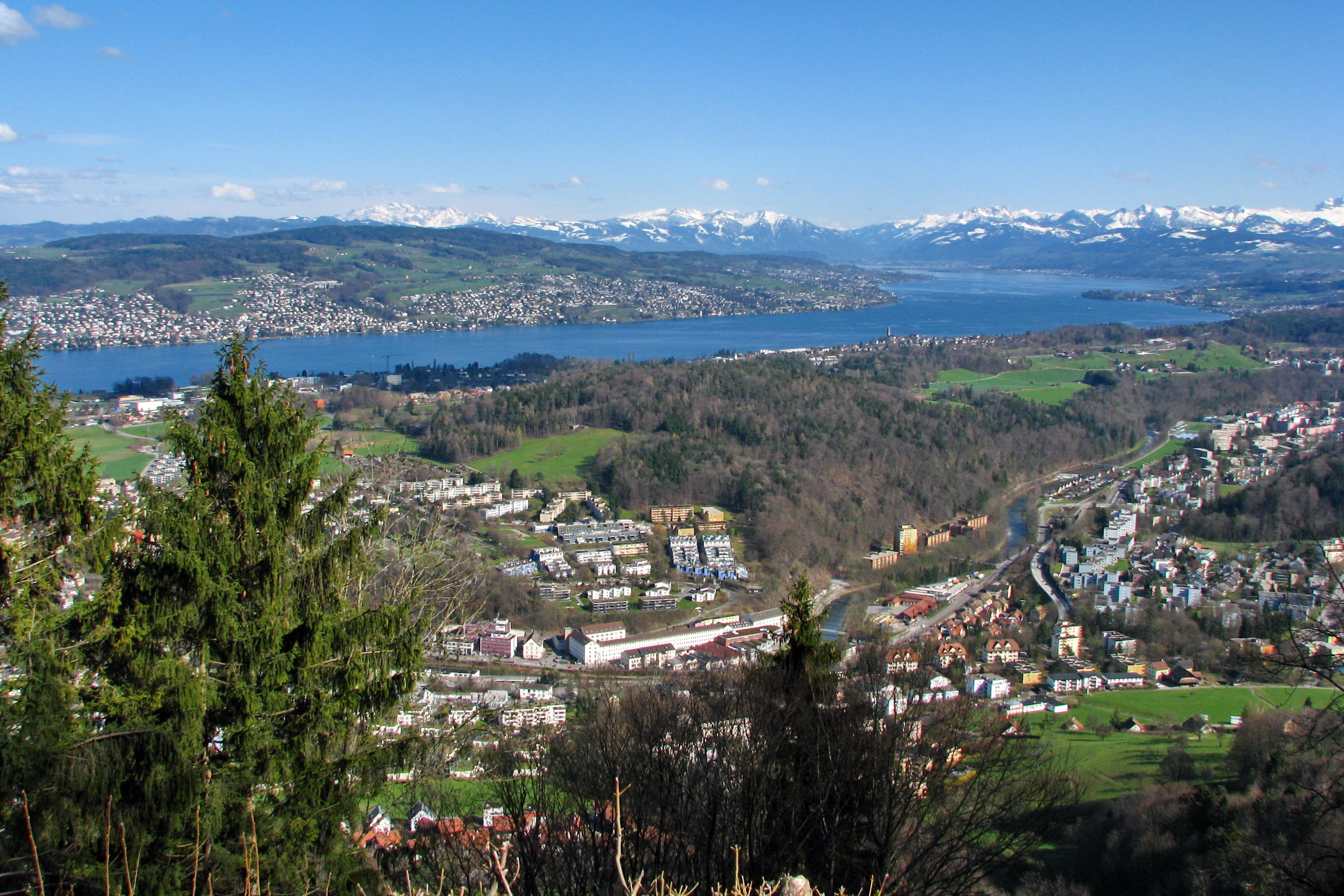
Pfannenstiel as seen from nearby Felsenegg

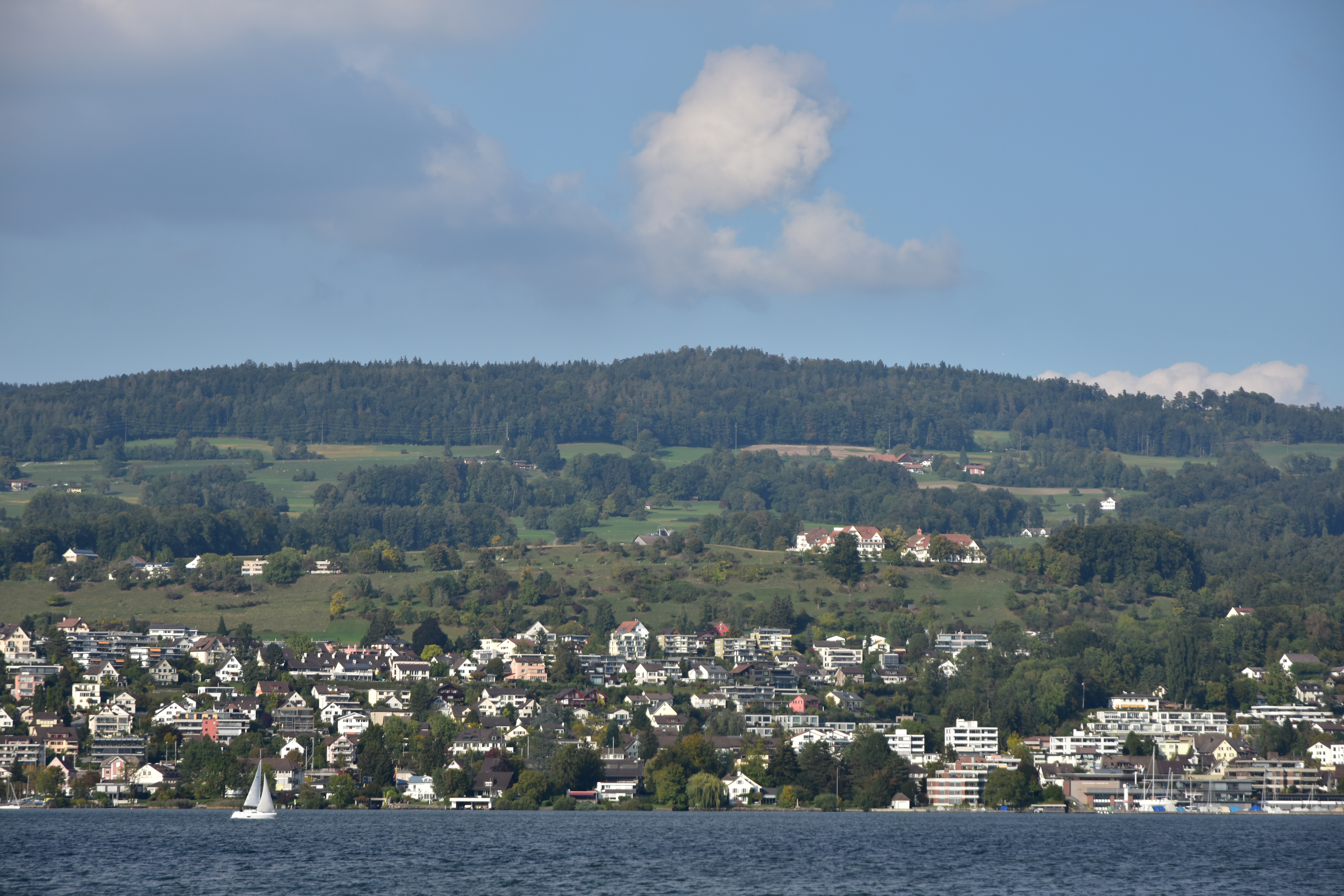
Pfannenstiel summit as seen from Au Peninsula

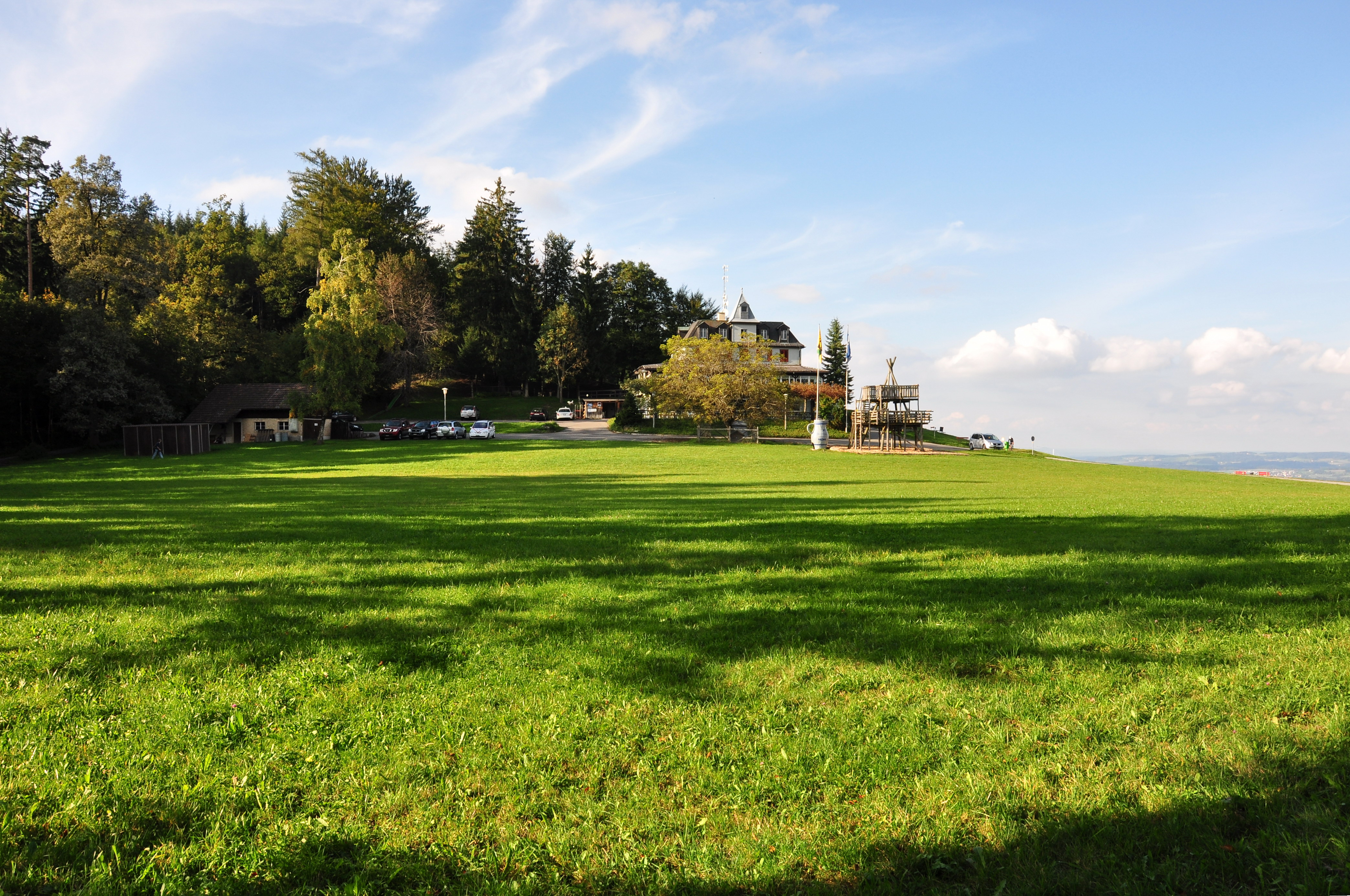
Hochwacht and Okenshöhe

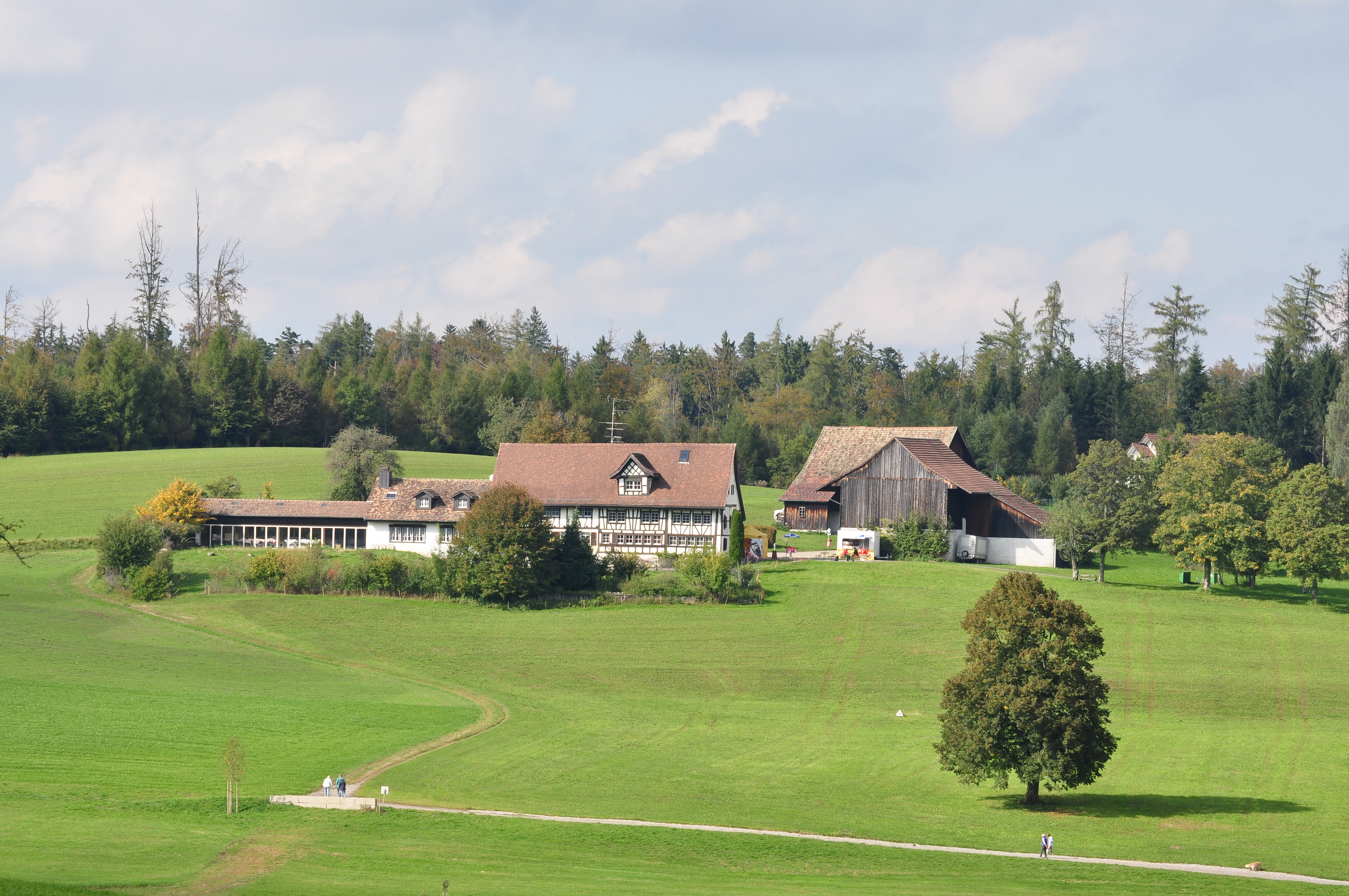
Guldenen

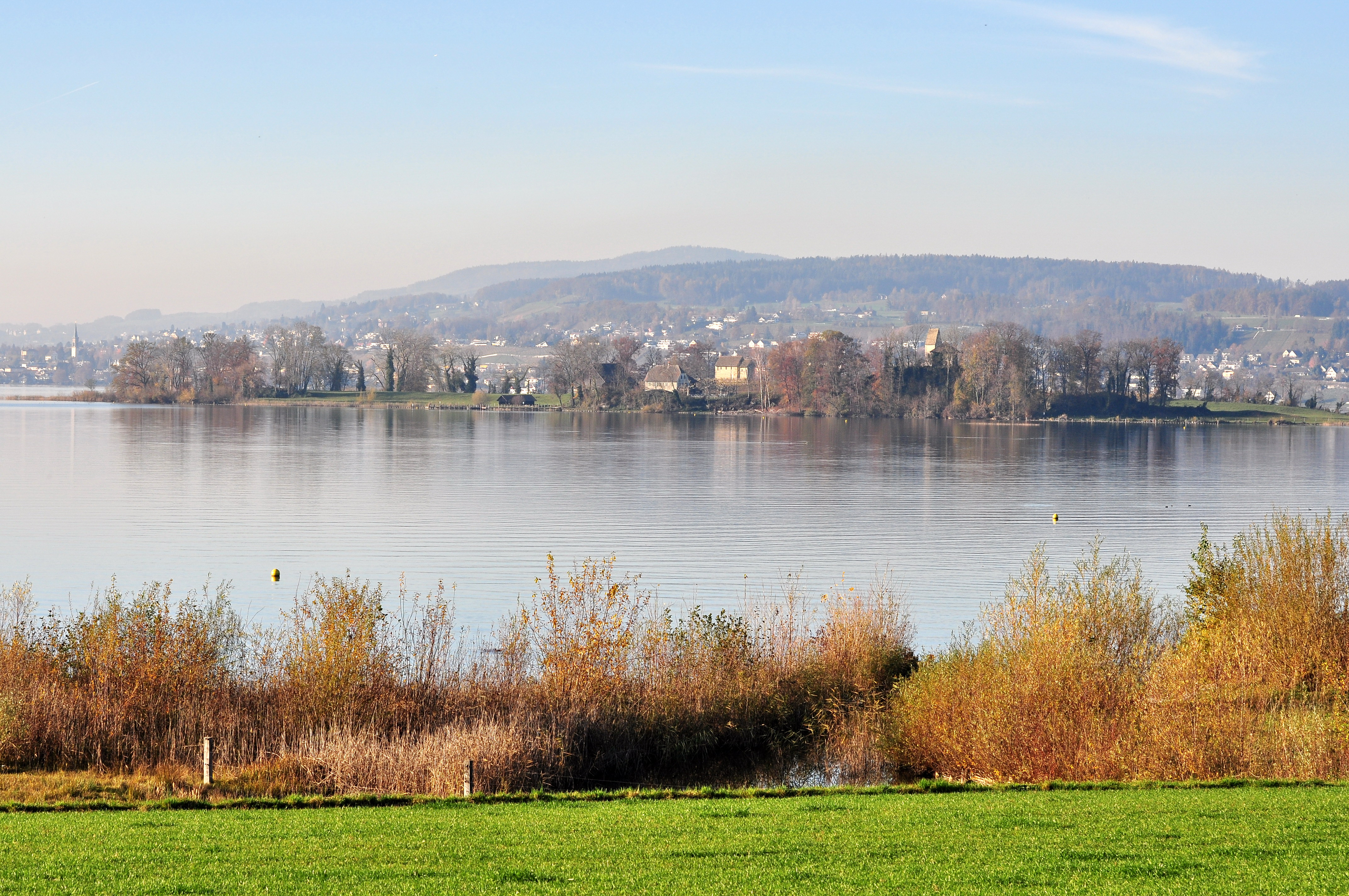
Pfannestiel as seen from Frauenwinkel protected area on Seedamm lake shore

== Geography ==
Pfannenstiel (Swiss German: Pfannenstil meaning pan handle) is commonly used for the mountain and the region of a longish mountain area. It is located in the district of Meilen, some 15 km (9.3 mi) in the southeast of the city of Zürich, bordered by Greifensee and Zürcher Oberland in the northeast, Lake Zürich in the southwest and the area around the municipality of Hombrechtikon in the east. In the northwest, Pfannenstiel is bordered by the village of Forch and a former mountain pass (668 metres (2,192 ft)) leading from Glatt valley to the Lake Zürich shore. Its highest point (Okenshöhe) is about 450 metres above the Lake Zürich. From southeast to northwest, Pfannenstiel is part of a chain of peaks respectively mountains: Guldenen (778 metres (2,552 ft)), Wassberg (715 metres (2,346 ft)), Öschbrig (696 metres (2,283 ft)), Adlisberg (701 metres (2,300 ft)), Zürichberg (676 metres (2,218 ft)), Käferberg-Waidberg (601 metres (1,972 ft)) and Hönggerberg (541 metres (1,775 ft)).

The area alongside Lake Zürich had been formed as the left moraine of the Ice Age glacier, the bed of which is now the Lake Zürich.

== History and origin of the name ==
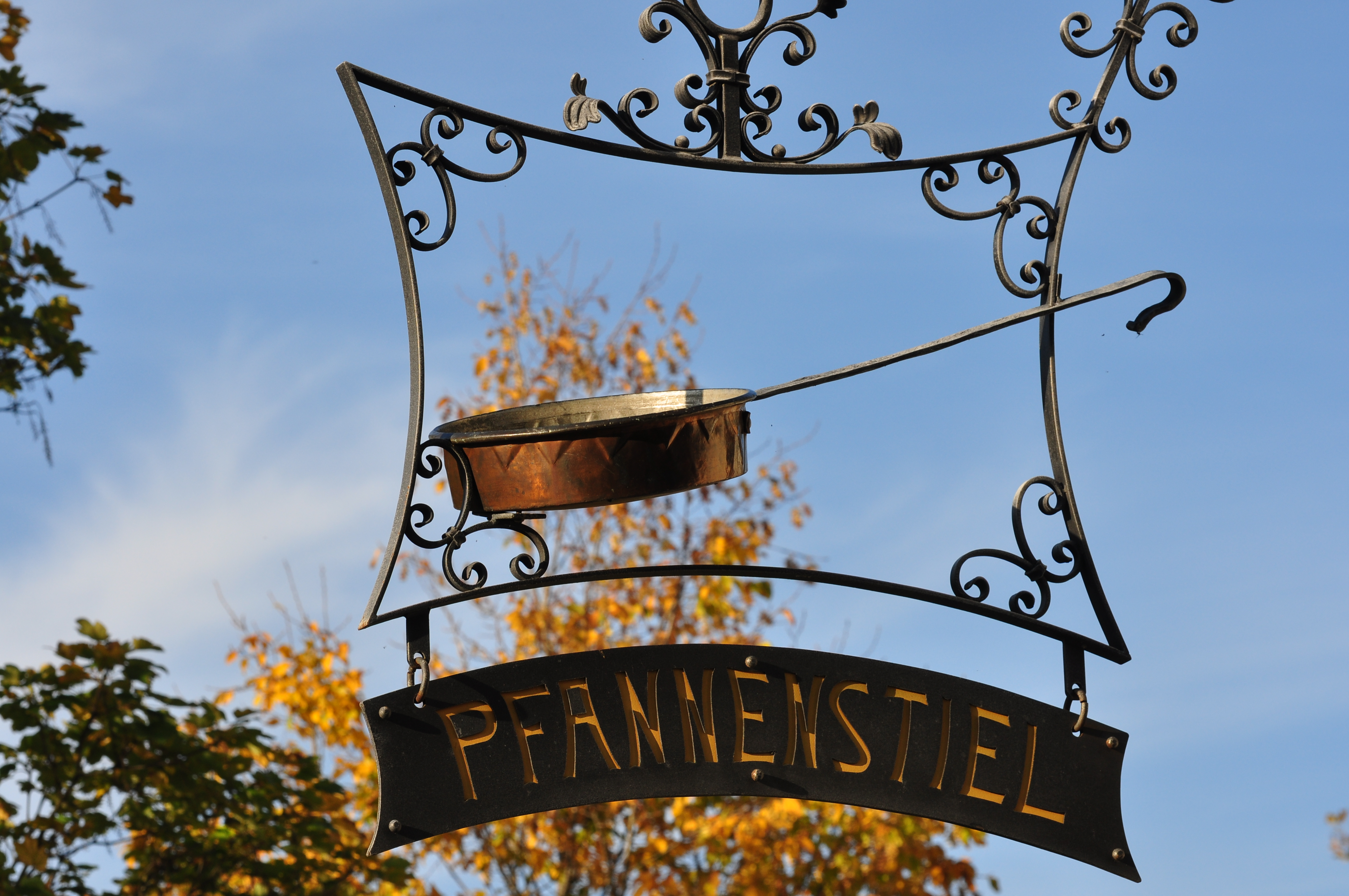
Pfannenstiel inn sign

On the origin of the name Pfannenstiel remembers the plate (Inn sign) of the Vorderer Pfannenstiel restaurant: A pan containing pitch used to send smoke signals. In the 17th century or much earlier, the government of the city of Zürich established a system of Hochwachten to warn, in cases of emergency as threat of war, the neighboring Hochwachten on the Albis, near Forch, on Zürichberg, Käferberg, Bachtel, Uetliberg, and so on, by fire and smoke. The Pfannenstiel Hochwacht was located on the summit called Okenshöhe as from there numerous other Hochwachten were in direct sight. For the same reason, in 19th century Okenhöhe was uses for a triangulation point as other triangulation points can be measured. These measurements form the backbone of the national geographical survey. Nevertheless, the pan with the fire as sign of "bad luck" it's not the real origin of the term Pfannenstiel: It was first mentioned in documents of the year 1333, and it is assumed that the term points to a meadow and farmland nearby forming a panhandle.

== Literary honor ==
Pfannenstiel got further literary honor: The Swiss poet Albin Zollinger (1895–1941) immortalized Pfannenstiel in his novel „Pfannenstiel: Die Geschichte eines Bildhauers“ („The Story of a Sculptor“). In the novel, a sculptor returns to Switzerland, and disappointed by the political reality, he retires on Pfannenstiel, builds a house and finds an intact village community. Three weeks before his death at the age of 46, Zollinger met the young Max Frisch on the Pfannenstiel.

== Pfannenstiel tower ==
In 1893 on the Bachtel mountain was built an observation tower of steel which was declared in 1979 by the government of the canton of Zürich as an object of historic preservation. Six years later, the tower was stored by the Swiss Post (former PTT) on technical reasons, and in 1992, the tower was rebuilt on Pfannenstiel. The tower is riveted and is made of steel and cast iron. The reconstruction was done by specialists from Eastern Europe where this technology still was in use. The new location for the reconstruction was initially controversial: The cantonal authorities preferred the highest elevation on the mountain in the middle of forested area. The executive of the municipality of Meilen was not satisfied as it is a protected area. The final location is somewhat below located in the municipality of Egg.

== Further points of interest ==
Pfannenstiel is a picturesque area, and the upper side of the mountain houses four restaurants overlooking Lake Zürich, Etzel, Zimmerberg, Albis, Uetliberg to the south and to the west, and Greifensee, Glattal, Bachtel and Zürcher Oberland to the north and east. The upper part of the mountain is mostly woodland and a popular recreational area with picnic sites, in addition there are hiking routes, among the Küsnachter Tobel pathway. In winter season a cross-country skiing trail is a popular point of interest.

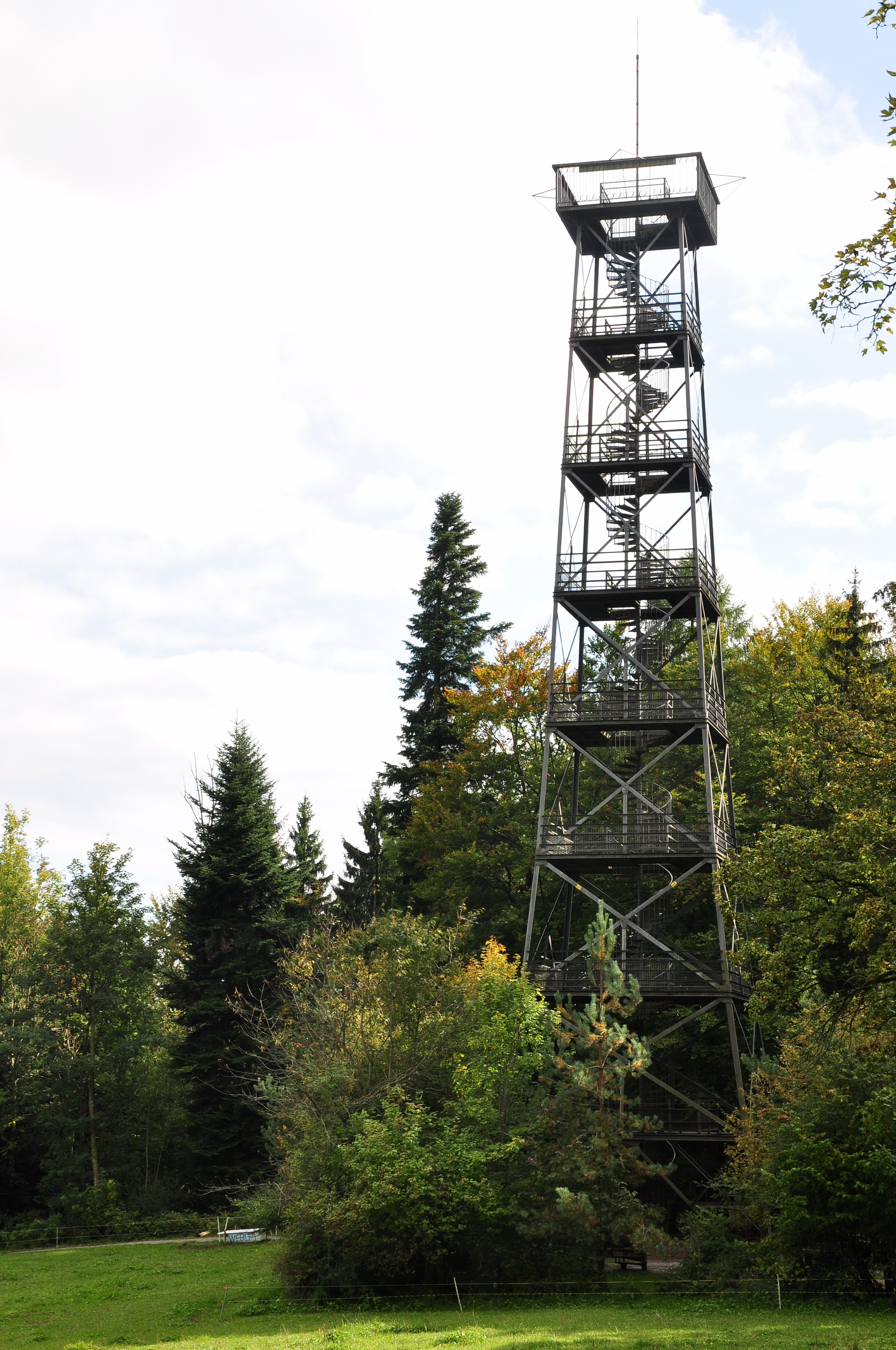
Pfannenstiel tower

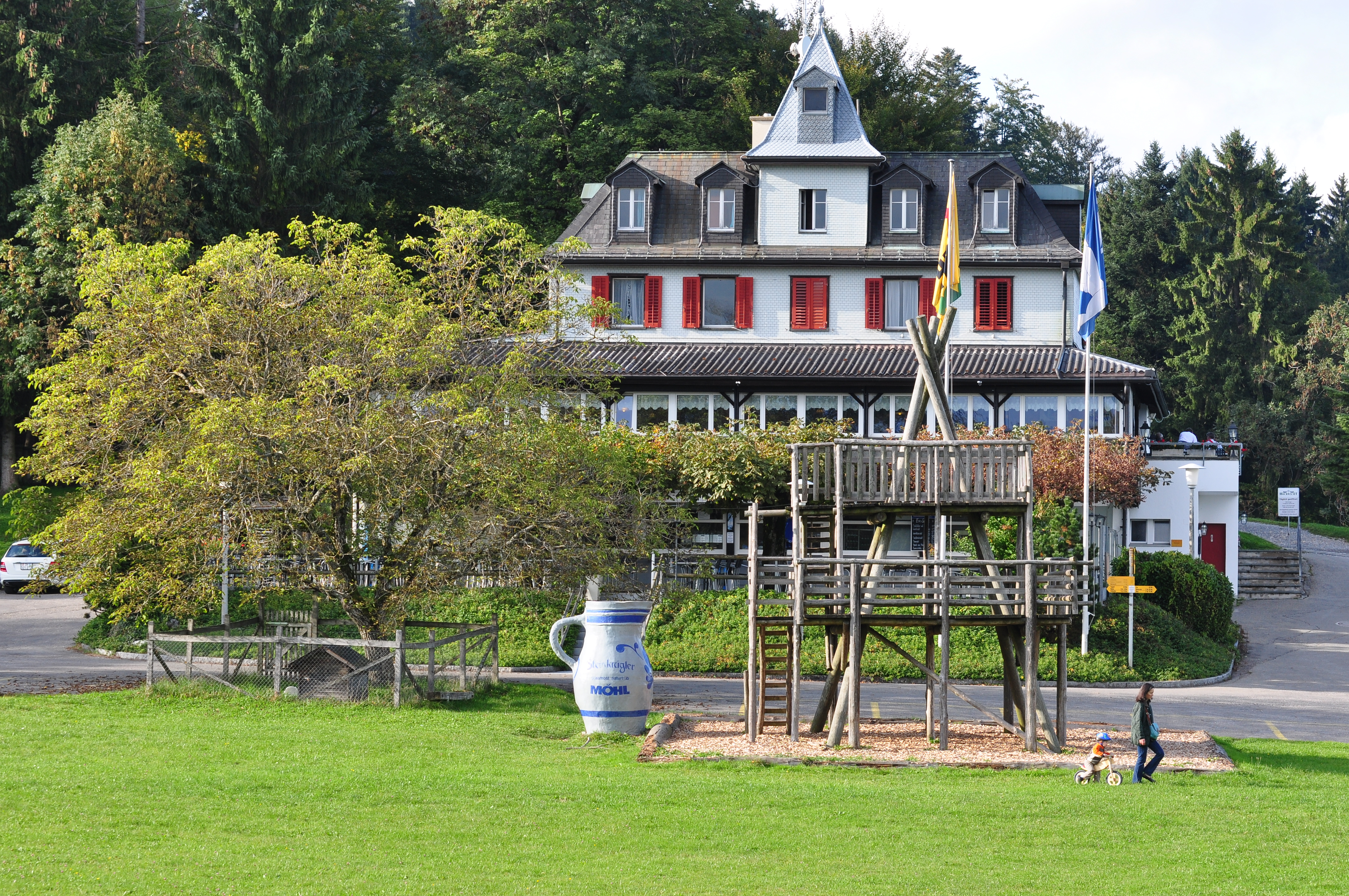
Restaurant "Hochwacht" on the summit

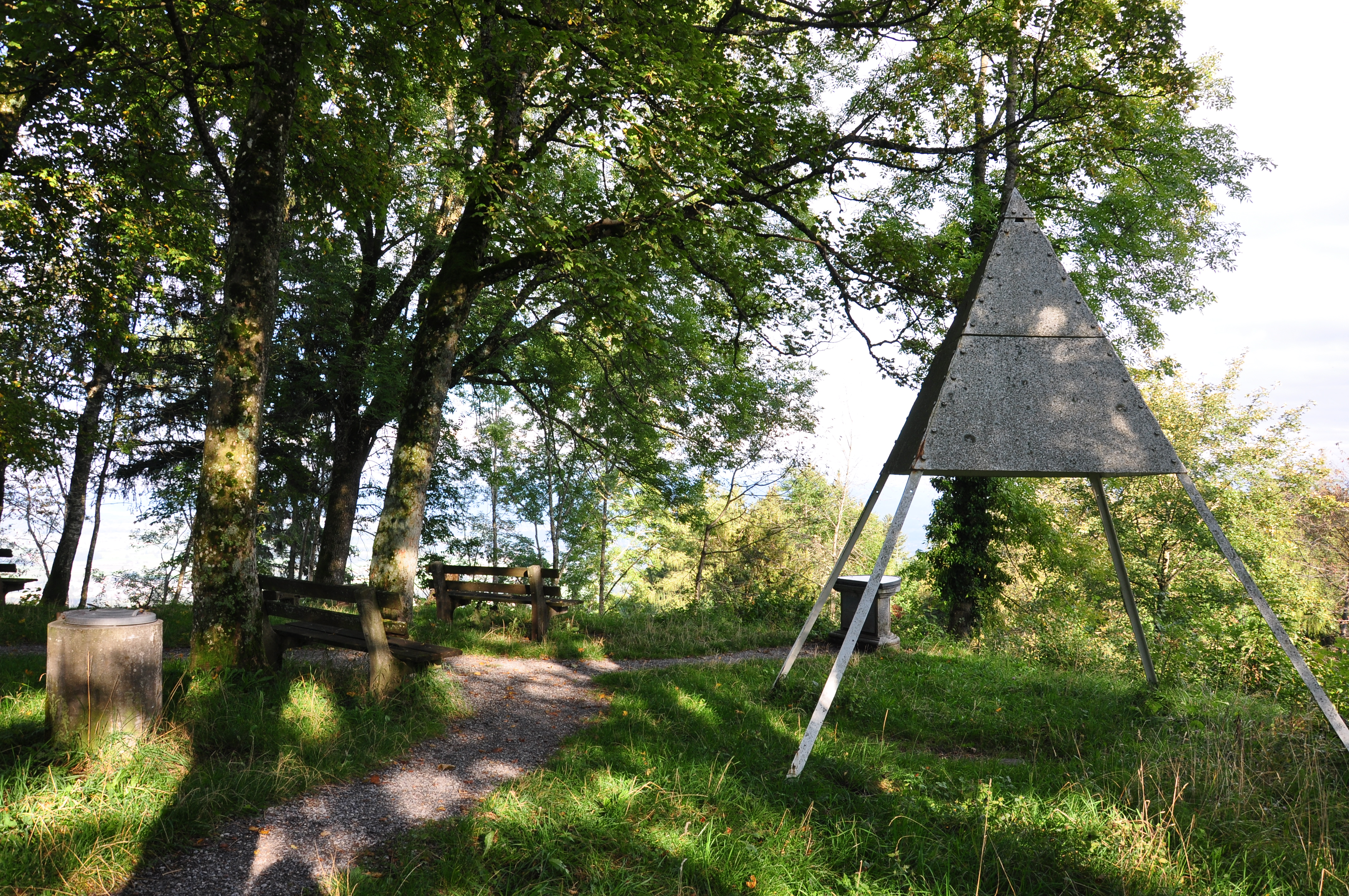
Okenshöhe

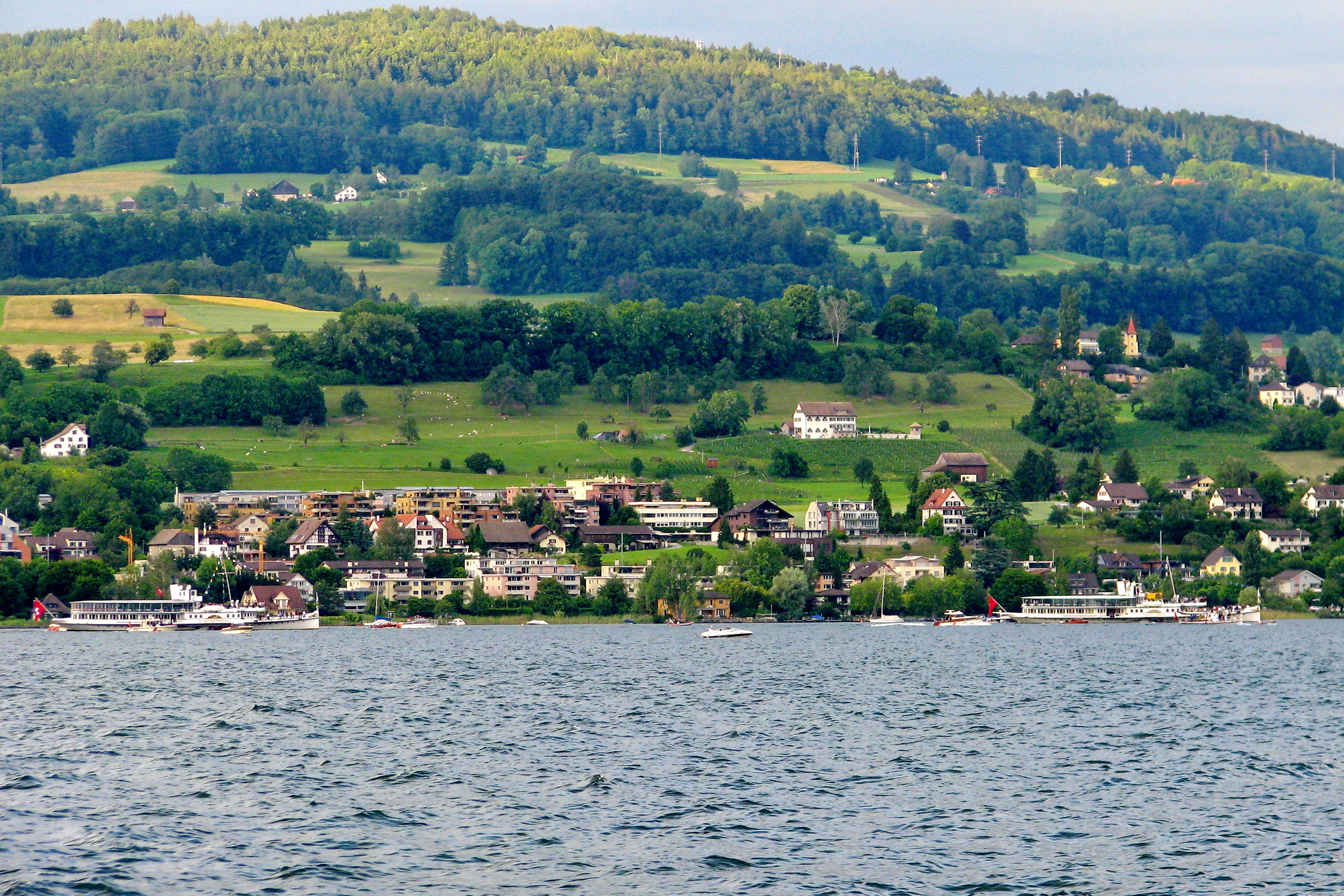
Paddle steamers Stadt Rapperswil (to the left) and Stadt Zürich on centennial tour, Pfannenstiel summit in the background (June 2009)

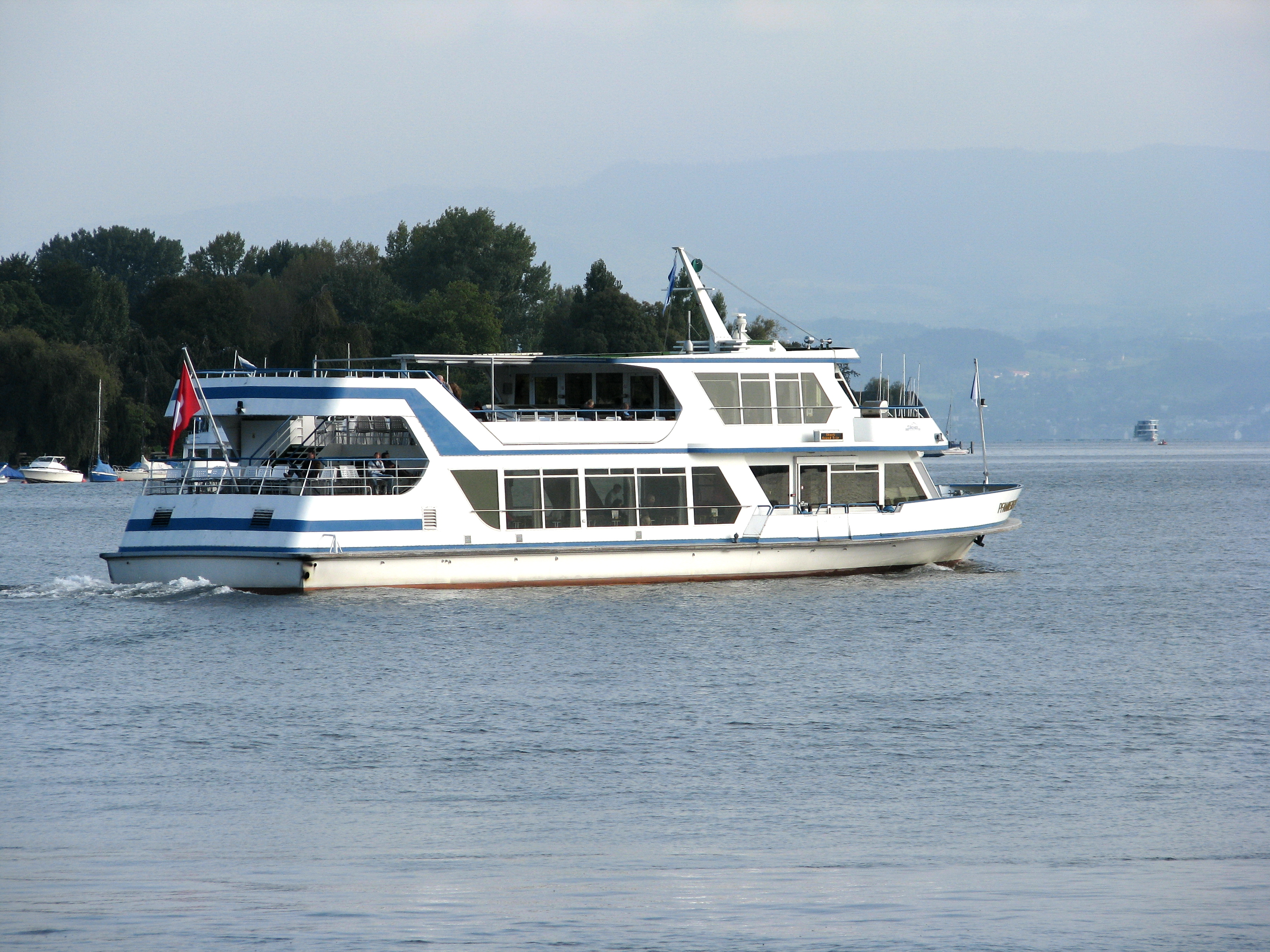
Motor ship "Pfannenstiel" of the Zürichsee-Schifffahrtsgesellschaft

As mentioned, Okenshöhe triangulation point is the highest elevation on Pfannenstiel allowing beautiful views. It is named after the natural scientist Oken who, in the beginning of the 19th century, did a lot of tours on mountains rarely visited. In 1838 he bought the area now called Okenshöhe. His heirs donated the land to citizens of the municipality of Meilen. They formed the Mittwochsgesellschaft (Wednesday society) which did not allow to overbuilt this area.

== Region Pfannenstiel ==
The term "Region Pfannenstiel" usually refers to the mountain, the area and plateau between Zollikon-Zollikerberg and Hombrechtikon-Feldbach bordered by the upper Glatt valley–Zürcher Oberland and Lake Zürich. This region includes the municipalities of Egg, Erlenbach, Herrliberg, Hombrechtikon, Küsnacht, Meilen, Männedorf, Oetwil am See, Stäfa, Uetikon am See, Zollikon and Zumikon.

== Transportation ==
The Forchbahn line (S18) from Zürich Stadelhofen railway station to (preferred) Forch or Esslingen train station, S-Bahn Zürich on the lines S6 and S16 (Küsnacht: Küsnachtertobel to Forch), as well as S6 and S7 to Meilen (Bus line 922, stop Vorderer Pfannenstiel) or Stäfa or Hombrechtikon-Feldbach and local bus lines 955 and 970, run up to different parts of the Pfannenstiel area. In the summer there are regular boats to Zürich as well as along the lake to Rapperswil, run by the Zürichsee-Schifffahrtsgesellschaft (ZSG). A small motorship of the ZSG is named after the mountain.

== Literature ==
- Albin Zollinger: Pfannenstiel. Die Geschichte eines Bildhauers, novel, 1940 (literally: „Pfannenstiel. The Story of a Sculptor“). Suhrkamp-Taschenbuch, Frankfurt am Main 1990. ISBN 3-518-40280-3
