= St. Antonius Church, Egg =

Catholic Church in Egg, Zürich, Switzerland

Coordinates: 47.2994°N 8.6867°E

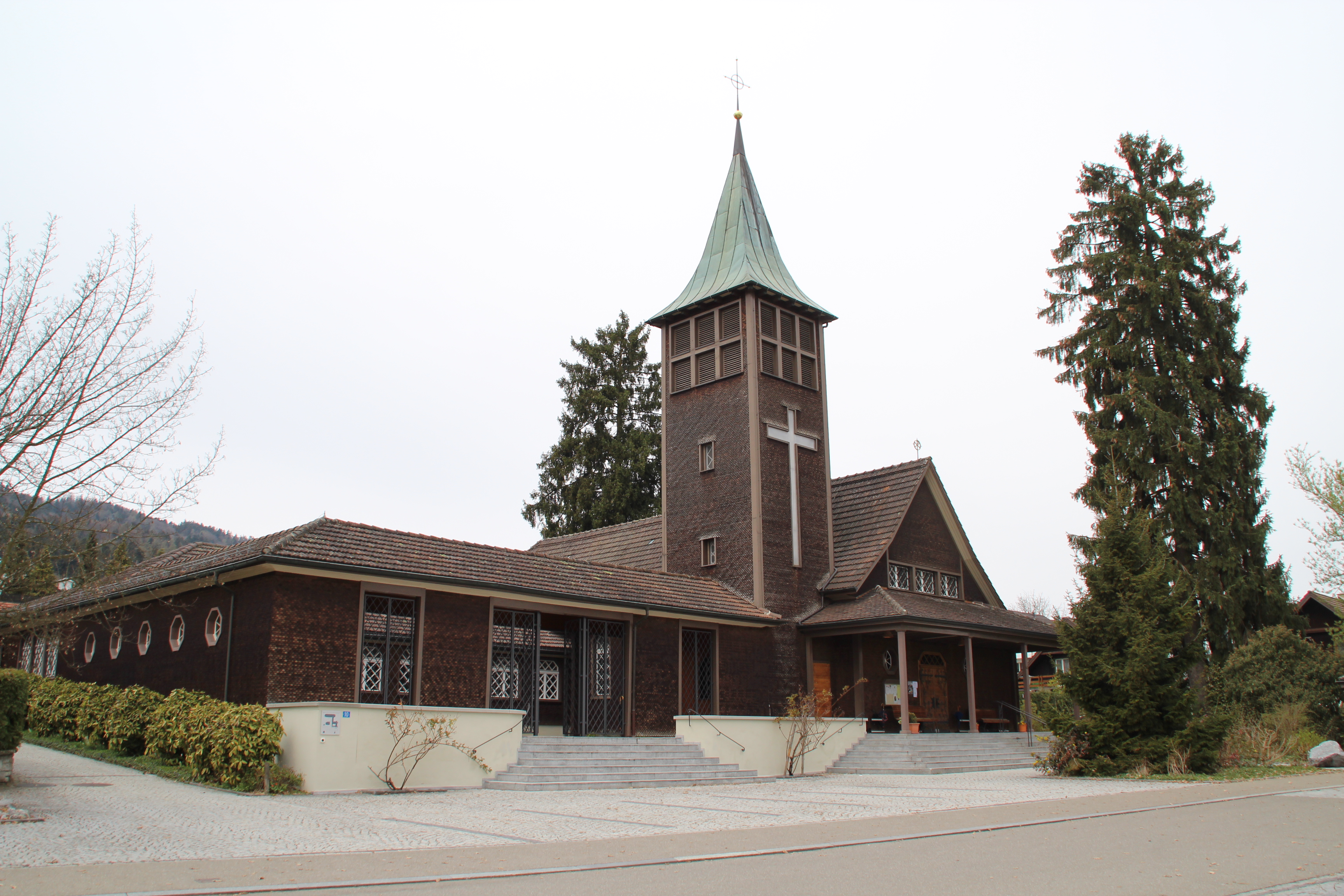
St. Antonius Church, Egg

The St Antonius Church, Egg is a Catholic Church in Egg, Zürich, Switzerland, dedicated to Anthony of Padua. Because of its importance as a place of pilgrimage it has been called "little-Padua".

== Architecture ==
In 1921 the architect Joseph Löhlein built a small, wooden chapel dedicated to Anthony of Padua on the grounds of the modern-day church. The chapel was later extended to its current size with additional buildings being added in 1939 and 1997.

== History and place of pilgrimage ==
The parish grounds its historical association with Anthony of Padua in the allegedly miraculous recovery of Pater Anton Bolte, who later was in charge of the parish, from a fatal illness in 1925.

In 1926 Pope Pius XI visited the parish and bestowed a relic of Anthony of Padua upon it. The relic is still held by the parish and is being used for liturgical purposes.
