= Albin Zollinger =

Swiss writer

Albin Zollinger (24 January 1895 – 7 November 1941) was a Swiss writer.

== Life ==
Born in Zürich, Albin Zollinger was the son of a precision mechanic and grew up in Rüti, Zürich and Argentina, where his parents unsuccessfully tried to establish a secure existence for the family. He attended the teacher’s seminar in Küsnacht and eventually, after a series of job changes, got a permanent position in Oerlikon, which he held until his death. His first novel was published in 1921.

All of Zollinger's works, his novels, narratives, poems, essays, articles, reviews, and letters, were written alongside his work as a teacher, his military service, his public engagements in the Swiss Writers' Association, and his work as an editor for “Die Zeit” and later “Nation”, and despite a family crisis and depression (his marriage ended in divorce after a few years).

His preferred place to write was in the Zürich's cafés, where he travelled from Oerlikon by tram after school. During the 1930s, his little marble table at the Café "Terrasse" achieved some local fame. There he met other Zürich writers, e.g. professor of literature Fritz Ernst, literary reviewer Bernhard Diebold, his friend Traugott Vogel or Rudolf Jakob Humm. Three weeks before his death at the age of 46, Zollinger met the young Max Frisch on the Pfannenstiel. Frisch mentioned the meeting in his diary (“Tagebuch 1946-1949“).

Zollinger died in Zürich, and is buried in an honorary grave at the “Nordheim” cemetery in Oerlikon. A square in Oerlikon was named after him in 1980. Albin Zollinger’s literary legacy is administrated by the Zentralbibliothek Zürich.

== List of works ==
- Die Gärten des Königs, novel, 1921 (literally: „The King's Gardens“)
- Der halbe Mensch, novel, 1929 (literally: „The Half Man“)
- Gedichte, 1933 („Poems“)
- Sternfrühe, poems, 1936 (literally: „Bright and Early“)
- Stille des Herbstes, poems, 1939 (literally: „Silence of Fall“)
- Haus des Lebens, poems, 1939 (literally: „House of Life“)
- Die große Unruhe, novel, 1939 (literally: „The Big Unrest“)
- Pfannenstiel. Die Geschichte eines Bildhauers, novel, 1940 (literally: „Pfannenstiel. The Story of a Sculptor“). Suhrkamp-Taschenbuch, Frankfurt am Main 1990. ISBN 3-518-40280-3
- Bohnenblust oder Die Erzieher, novel, 1941 (literally: „Bohnenblust or The Educators“)
- Der Fröschlacher Kuckuck. Leben und Taten einer Stadt in zwanzig Abenteuern, 1941 (literally: „The cuckoo of Fröschlach. Life and deeds of a city in twenty adventures“)
