= Woodbine Municipal Airport =

Woodbine Municipal Airport may refer to:

- Woodbine Municipal Airport (Iowa) in Woodbine, Iowa, United States (FAA: 3Y4)
- Woodbine Municipal Airport (New Jersey) in Woodbine, New Jersey, United States (FAA: OBI)
