= Bine =

Bine can mean any of the following:

- Bine (botany), a category of climbing plants which support themselves by the shoots growing in a helix around a support
- Bine language, a Papuan language of Papua New Guinea
- Binə, Baku, a settlement in Baku, Azerbaijan
- Bīne, Latvian surname
- Bine (name)
- Binə, Khojavend, a village in Khojavend Rayon, Azerbaijan
- National Identity Bloc in Europe, Romanian electoral alliance abbreviated as BINE

== See also ==
- Haybine, a farm implement
