= Ubin, Syria =

Ubin أوبين Ma'ab
- Village
- Location in Syria
- Coordinates: 34°50′45″N 36°9′13″E
- Country: Syria
- Governorate: Tartus
- District: Safita
- Subdistrict: Safita

Population (2004 census)
  - Total: 2,349
- Time zone: UTC+3 (EET)
  - Summer (DST): UTC+2 (EEST)

Ubin (Arabic: أوبين, romanized: Ūbīn; also transliterated Aubin), also called Ma'ab (Arabic: المآب), is a village in northwestern Syria, administratively part of the Safita District of the Tartous Governorate. According to the Syria Central Bureau of Statistics (CBS), Ubin had a population of 2,349 in the 2004 census. Its inhabitants are Alawites.

== History ==
Ubin was recorded as an Alawite village in Ottoman tax records in 1519 and 1547. It became the headquarters village of the Barakat (originally called the Malikh), a prominent Alawite family. The earliest known mention of them was in 1711, when the Carmelite monk Elia Giacinto di Santa Maria visited the region and noted he was welcomed by Muhammad Barakat, the sheikh of Ubin. Members of the family, Hasan ibn Muhammad Barakat and Musa Barakat were listed in Ottoman court records from 1740 as the underwriters of the Alawite Shamsin family's iltizam (tax farm) of Safita, which included Ubin. Hasan is listed as the multazim (tax farmer) of Ubin in 1750. Hasan's son was recorded as its multazim in 1776 and 1778.

== Sources ==
- Winter, Stefan (2016). A History of the 'Alawis: From Medieval Aleppo to the Turkish Republic. Princeton and Oxford: Princeton University Press. ISBN 9780691167787.
