= Egg, Switzerland =

Egg
- Municipality
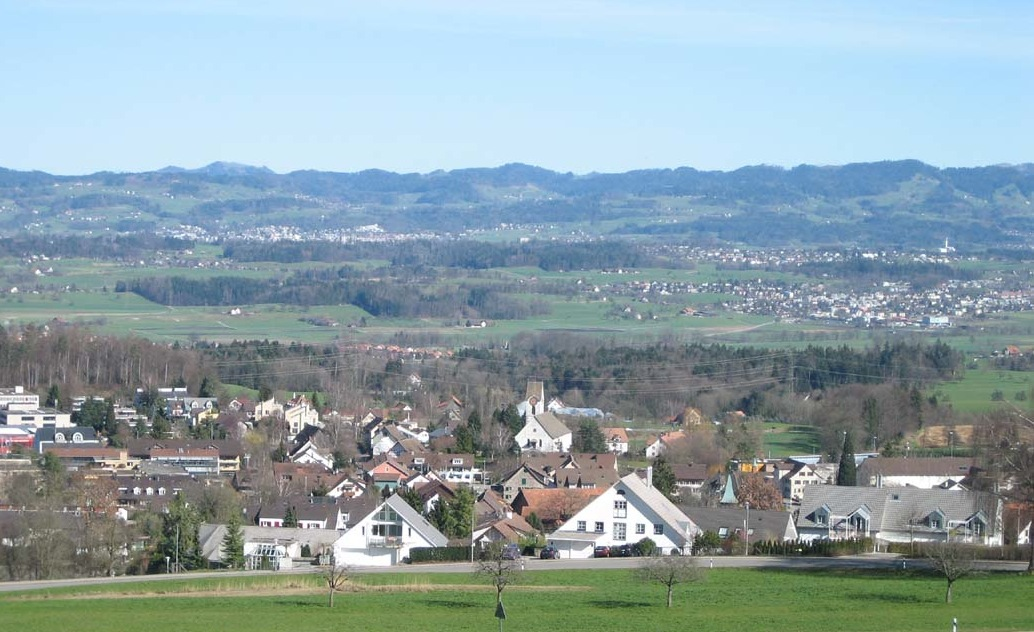

- Flag Coat of arms
- Location of Egg
- Location within Switzerland Location within Canton of Zurich
- Coordinates: 47°18′00″N 8°41′25″E
- Country: Switzerland
- Canton: Zurich
- District: Uster

Area
  - Total: 14.48 km^{2} (5.59 sq mi)
- Elevation: 545 m (1,788 ft)

Population (December 2020)
  - Total: 8,829
  - Density: 609.7/km^{2} (1,579/sq mi)
- Time zone: UTC+01:00 (CET)
  - Summer (DST): UTC+02:00 (CEST)
- Postal code: 8132
- SFOS number: 192
- ISO 3166 code: CH-ZH
- Surrounded by: Gossau, Grüningen, Herrliberg, Maur, Meilen, Mönchaltorf, Oetwil am See, Uetikon am See
- Website: www.egg.ch

Egg is a municipality in the district of Uster in the canton of Zürich in Switzerland.

== History ==
Egg is first mentioned in 775 as Echa.

== Geography ==
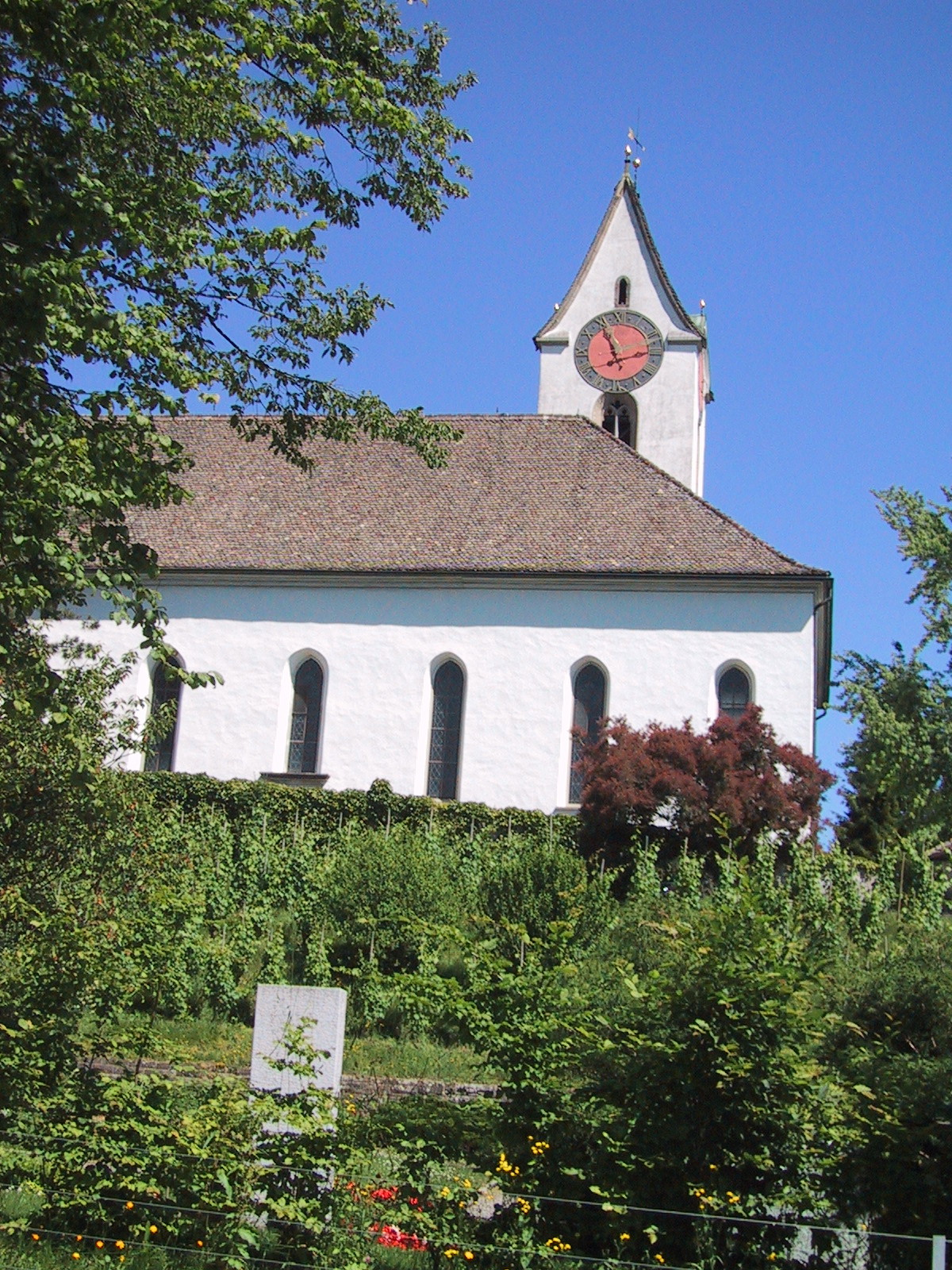
Church of Egg

Aerial view by Walter Mittelholzer (1922)

Egg has an area of 14.5 km^{2} (5.6 sq mi). Of this area, 58.1% is used for agricultural purposes, while 23.2% is forested. Of the rest of the land, 18.1% is settled (buildings or roads) and the remainder (0.6%) is non-productive (rivers, glaciers or mountains). In 1996 housing and buildings made up 12.9% of the total area, while transportation infrastructure made up the rest (5.2%). Of the total unproductive area, water (streams and lakes) made up 0.3% of the area. As of 2007 12.8% of the total municipal area was undergoing some type of construction.

The lowest elevation in the municipality is the Greifensee at 438 m (1,437 ft). The highest point in the municipality is the Pfannenstiel at 853 m (2,799 ft).

Egg is located in the Pfannenstiel region.

== Districts ==
There are three villages in Egg: Hinteregg (population: 1,500), Egg (population: 4,800) and Esslingen (population: 1,500). There are also smaller settlements (called Aussenwacht): Rällikon, Innervollikon, Usservollikon, Niederesslingen, Rohr, Schaubigen, Eichholz, Neuhaus, and Guldenen.

== Coat of arms ==
The coat of arms shows two entwined hands in blue. It was created at the beginning of the 19th century, influenced by the French Revolution. It symbolizes the motto of the Revolution: Freedom, Equality and Brotherhood.

== Demographics ==
Egg has a population (as of 31 December 2020) of 8,829. As of 2007, 17.1% of the population was made up of foreign nationals. As of 2008 the gender distribution of the population was 47.6% male and 52.4% female. Over the last 10 years the population has grown at a rate of 11.5%. Most of the population (as of 2000) speaks German (87.5%), with Italian being second most common (2.5%) and English being third (2.4%).

In the 2007 election the most popular party was the SVP which received 37.2% of the vote. The next three most popular parties were the SPS (16.2%), the FDP (15.9%) and the CSP (10.5%).

The age distribution of the population (as of 2000) is children and teenagers (0–19 years old) make up 23.8% of the population, while adults (20–64 years old) make up 63.9% and seniors (over 64 years old) make up 12.3%. In Egg about 82% of the population (between age 25-64) have completed either non-mandatory upper secondary education or additional higher education (either university or a Fachhochschule). There are 3068 households in Egg.

Egg has an unemployment rate of 1.85%. As of 2005, there were 207 people employed in the primary economic sector and about 70 businesses involved in this sector. 567 people are employed in the secondary sector and there are 63 businesses in this sector. 1404 people are employed in the tertiary sector, with 251 businesses in this sector. As of 2007 47.9% of the working population were employed full-time, and 52.1% were employed part-time.

As of 2008 there were 2349 Catholics and 3412 Protestants in Egg. In the 2000 census, religion was broken down into several smaller categories. From the census, 48.8% were some type of Protestant, with 46% belonging to the Swiss Reformed Church and 2.8% belonging to other Protestant churches. 29.2% of the population were Catholic. Of the rest of the population, 0% were Muslim, 4.6% belonged to another religion (not listed), 2.7% did not give a religion, and 14% were atheist or agnostic.

The historical population is given in the following table:

year	population
1467	38 households
1634	899
1699	1,245
1850	2,523
1900	2,309
1950	2,439

== Transport ==
The town centre of Zürich is connected to Egg with a special tramway — the Forchbahn. Egg is connected by the Autostrasse A52 to Zumikon and Hinwil.

== Notable people ==
- Hausi A. Muller (born 1955), Professor, Associate Dean Research, University of Victoria
- Peter Wuffli (born 1957), Manager
- Brigitte Oertli (born 1962), Skier
- Billy Meier (born 1936)

== See also ==
- St. Antonius Church, Egg
