= Aubin (name) =

- Gender: Male
- Language: Latin

Origin
- Meaning: "white" "bright"

Other names
- See also: Albin

Aubin is a masculine French given name variant of Albin, from the Roman cognate Albinus, derived from the Latin albus, meaning "white" or "bright". It is also common as a surname. People with the name Aubin include:

== Saint ==
- Albinus of Angers, a.k.a. Saint Aubin of Angers, French saint

== Given name ==
- Aubin-Edmond Arsenault (1870–1968), Premier of Prince Edward Island, Canada
- Joseph Aubin Doiron (1922–1995), Canadian, Arcadian politician

== Surname ==
- Albert Zenophile Aubin (1891–1957), Canadian politician
- Azaire Adulphe Aubin (1850–?), Canadian politician
- Charlotte Aubin (born 1991), Canadian actress
- Christian Aubin (1927–2007), French guitarist and luthier
- Jean-Sébastien Aubin (1977–), Canadian ice hockey player
- Joseph Marius Alexis Aubin (1802 – 1891), French collector
- Napoléon Aubin (1812–1890), Canadian journalist
- Penelope Aubin (c. 1679–c. 1731), English novelist and translator
- Serge Aubin (1975–), Canadian professional ice hockey centre
- Thierry Aubin (1942–2009), French mathematician
- Tony Aubin (1907–1981), French composer

== See also ==
- Saint-Aubin (disambiguation)
