= Woodbine (New Albany, Indiana) =

Historic house in Indiana, United States

- U.S. National Register of Historic Places
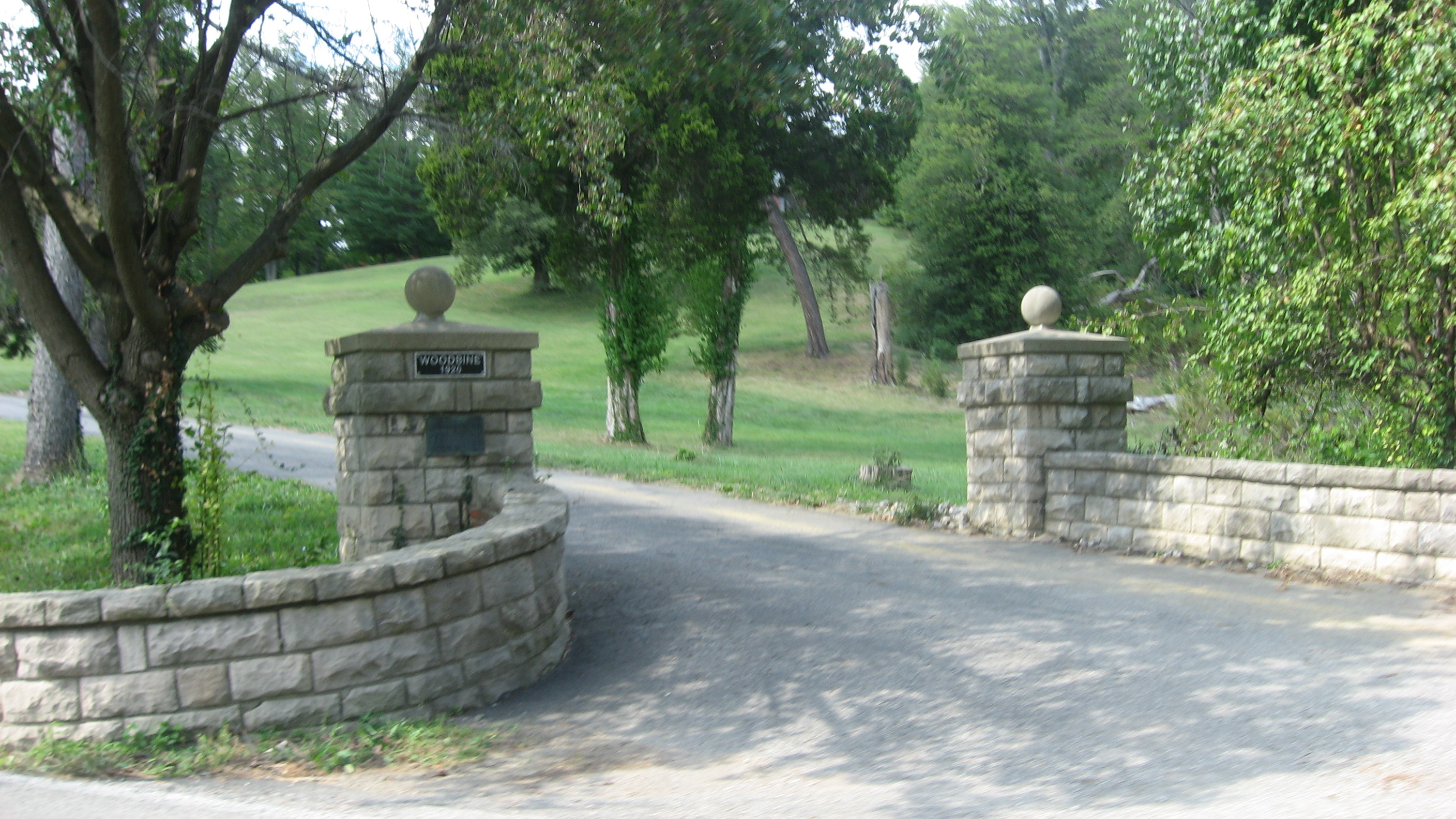
- Gateway to the property

- Location within Indiana Location within the United States
- Location: 1800 Old Vincennes Rd., New Albany, Indiana
- Coordinates: 38°17′33″N 85°51′8″W
- Area: 5 acres (2.0 ha)
- Built: 1920
- Built by: Rasmussen, Anders
- Architectural style: Bungalow/craftsman
- NRHP reference No.: 94001107
- Added to NRHP: September 8, 1994

Woodbine, also known as the Anders Rasmussen House, is a historic early-20th-century estate located at New Albany, Indiana. It was built in 1920 for Anders Rasmussen, who owned a florist business in New Albany and once served as a florist for the King of Denmark. The 2 1/2-story Bungalow / American Craftsman-style house is made of stucco, brick, limestone, asphalt, and terra cotta, with a full basement. The house includes a 1 1/2-story caretaker's apartment. The house stayed with the family until 1945, and has gone through several hands since then. The estate is currently owed and being restored by the owner/winemaker for Downtown New Albany's River City Winery located just two miles away. Plans for a vineyard on the estate are underway.

It was listed on the National Register of Historic Places in 1994.
