= Zumikon =

- Municipality
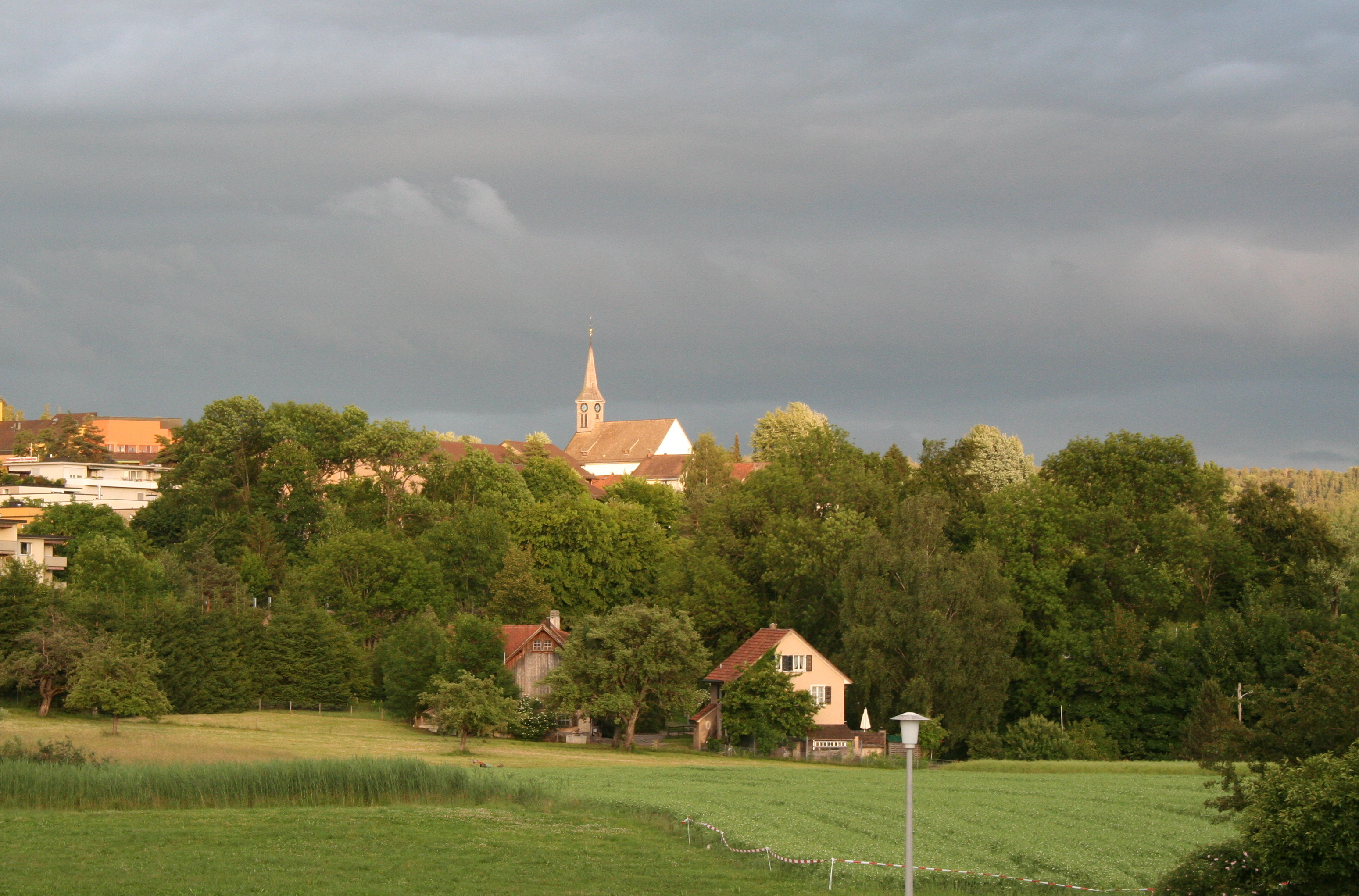

- Flag Coat of arms
- Location of Zumikon
- Location within Switzerland Location within Canton of Zurich
- Coordinates: 47°20′N 8°37′E
- Country: Switzerland
- Canton: Zurich
- District: Meilen

Area
  - Total: 5.44 km^{2} (2.10 sq mi)
- Elevation: 620 m (2,030 ft)

Population (December 2020)
  - Total: 5,587
  - Density: 1,030/km^{2} (2,660/sq mi)
- Time zone: UTC+01:00 (CET)
  - Summer (DST): UTC+02:00 (CEST)
- Postal code: 8126
- SFOS number: 160
- ISO 3166 code: CH-ZH
- Surrounded by: Küsnacht, Maur, Zollikon
- Website: www.zumikon.ch

Zumikon is a municipality in the district of Meilen in the canton of Zürich in Switzerland. It is located in the Pfannenstiel region.

== History ==
Aerial view from 500 m by Walter Mittelholzer (1923)

The source of the name Zumikon originated in the year 946 AD, from a hamlet named Zuminga. At the start of the 17th century, the population was just 100, and most of these were farmers. Until 1707, Zumikon was a separate municipality, and the integral part of Waltikon was independent too, along with Gössikon. This lasted until 1804. In the early 20th century, Zumikon remained a farm village claiming only 587 inhabitants in 1900. The Waltikon area was practically unbuilt territory.

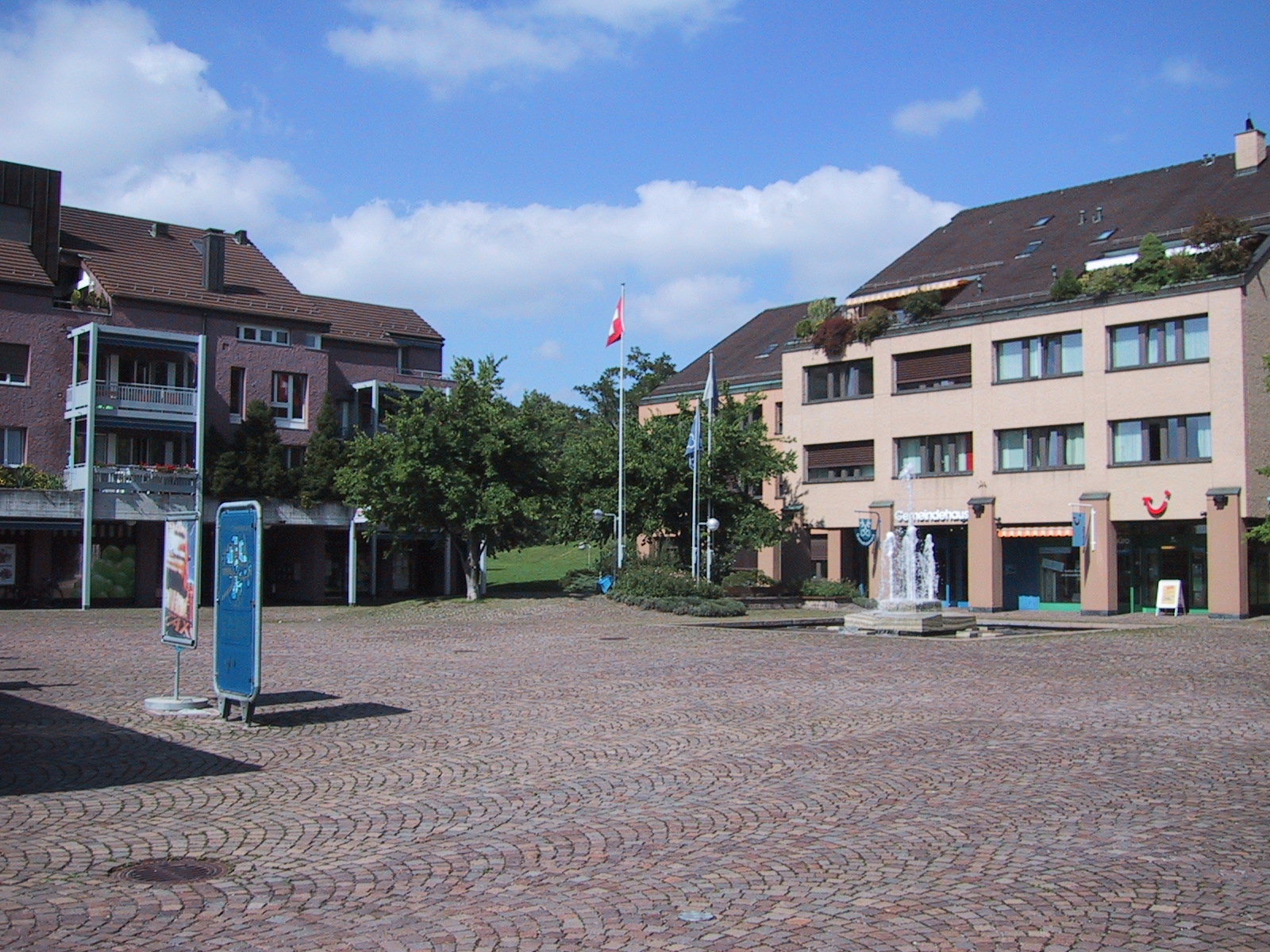
Town hall and central square in Zumikon

The community centre (Gemeinschaftszentrum) was built in 1980, and that was when modern Zumikon took its form. The mayor of Zumikon at that time was Elisabeth Kopp who was to become the first female Swiss federal councillor in 1984. Zumikon is now a small town, consisting of mostly wealthy residents instead of farmers. Important schools—such as the Farlifang School and the Inter-Community School Zürich—are in the area. The town centre is the Dorfplatz (literally "town square"), which consists of an upper section inaccessible to motor vehicles.

== Geography ==
Zumikon has an area of 5.5 km^{2} (2.1 sq mi). Of this area, 32% is used for agricultural purposes, while 29.1% is forested. Of the rest of the land, 38.8% is settled (buildings or roads) and the remainder (0.2%) is non-productive (rivers, glaciers or mountains). In 1996 housing and buildings made up 31.8% of the total area, while transportation infrastructure made up the rest (7.4%). Of the total unproductive area, water (streams and lakes) made up 0% of the area. As of 2007 31.7% of the total municipal area was undergoing some type of construction.

== Demographics ==
Zumikon has a population (as of 31 December 2020) of 5,587. As of 2007, 19.4% of the population was made up of foreign nationals. As of 2008 the gender distribution of the population was 47% male and 53% female. Over the last 10 years the population has grown at a rate of 8.1%. Most of the population (as of 2000) speaks German (85.0%), with English being second most common ( 4.0%) and Italian being third ( 3.2%).

In the 2007 election the most popular party was the FDP which received 34.2% of the vote. The next three most popular parties were the SVP (30.1%), the SPS (11.1%) and the CSP (8.9%).

The age distribution of the population (as of 2000) is children and teenagers (0–19 years old) make up 19.8% of the population, while adults (20–64 years old) make up 61.1% and seniors (over 64 years old) make up 19%. In Zumikon about 85.3% of the population (between age 25–64) have completed either non-mandatory upper secondary education or additional higher education (either university or a Fachhochschule). There are 2050 households in Zumikon.

Zumikon has an unemployment rate of 1.46%. As of 2005, there were 6 people employed in the primary economic sector and about 3 businesses involved in this sector. 246 people are employed in the secondary sector and there are 42 businesses in this sector. 1085 people are employed in the tertiary sector, with 218 businesses in this sector. As of 2007 33.3% of the working population were employed full-time, and 66.7% were employed part-time.

As of 2008 there were 1235 Catholics and 2001 Protestants in Zumikon. In the 2000 census, religion was broken down into several smaller categories. From the census, 50.2% were some type of Protestant, with 48% belonging to the Swiss Reformed Church and 2.2% belonging to other Protestant churches. 26.3% of the population were Catholic. Of the rest of the population, 0% were Muslim, 4.5% belonged to another religion (not listed), 2.8% did not give a religion, and 15.3% were atheist or agnostic.

== Transport ==
The Forchbahn narrow-gauge railway connects to both Waltikon and Zumikon. A tunnel was built in 1974 to spare Zumikon its noise. On top of that there is also the 912 Bus line that connects the town to Küsnacht. Zumikon is also the starting point of the A52 road. Zumikon has a high percentage of expatriates from around the world, drawn by its easy commute to Zurich (15 minutes) and the International School.
