= Verkehrsbetriebe Zürichsee und Oberland =

Public transport operator in Switzerland

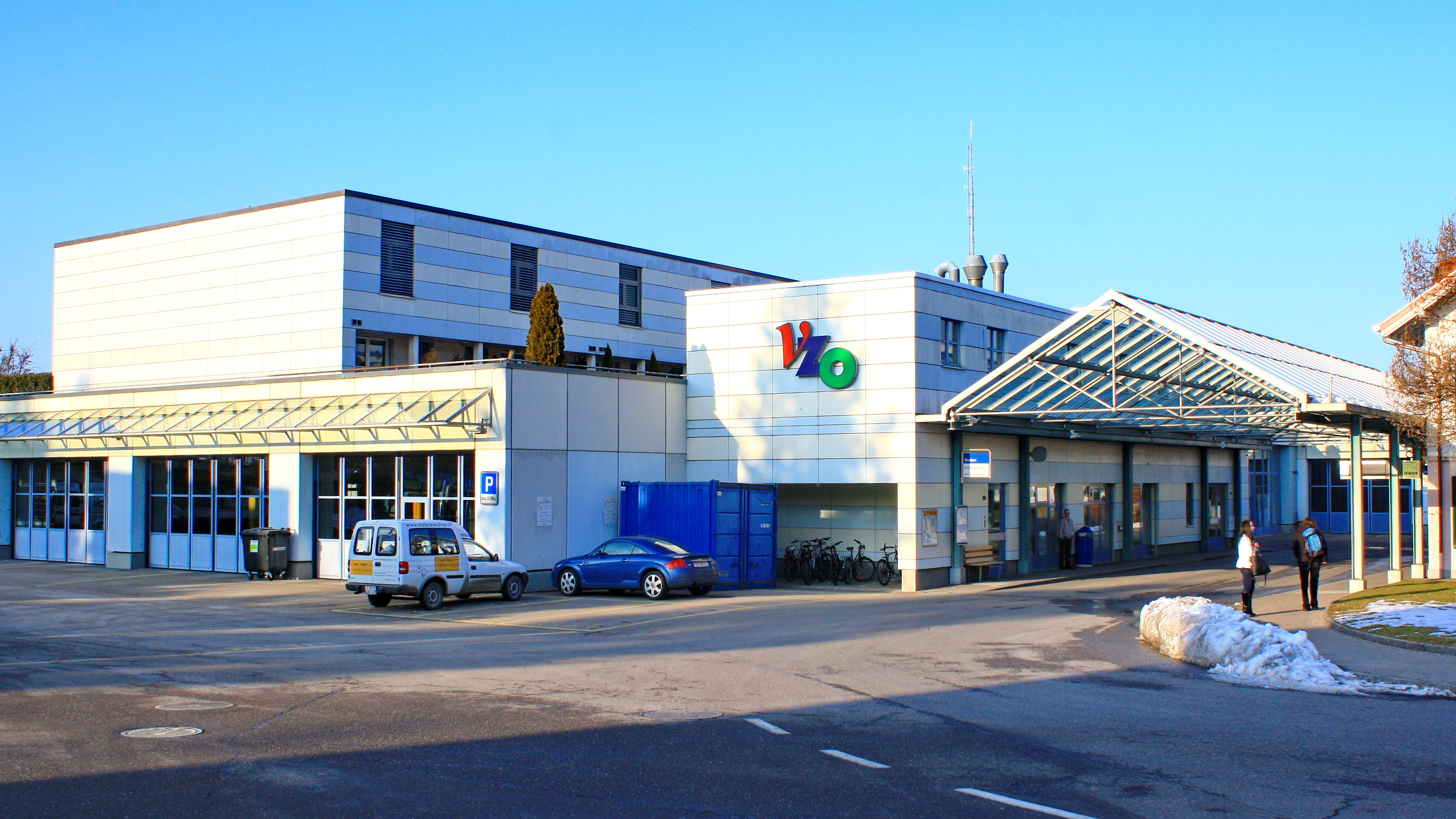
- The VZO headquarters in Grüningen
- Company type: Joint stock company
- Industry: Transport
- Founded: 1948
- Headquarters: Grüningen, Switzerland
- Area served: South eastern canton of Zürich; Western canton of St Gallen
- Website: vzo.ch

Verkehrsbetriebe Zürichsee und Oberland (VZO) is a public transport operator in the region between Lake Zürich and the Zürcher Oberland to the south-east of the city of Zürich in the canton of Zürich. It operates bus services between the various communities of this region and, since 2008, in the adjoining municipality of Rapperswil-Jona in the canton of St Gallen.

== History ==
In the first half of the 20th century, the region between Lake Zürich and the Zürcher Oberland was served by a number of rail lines. These included a standard gauge steam railway, the Uerikon-Bauma-Bahn, and two metre gauge electric tramways, the Wetzikon-Meilen-Bahn and the Uster-Oetwil-Bahn. These three lines were operating with large financial losses, and it was decided to replace them with buses. The VZO was founded to operate these replacement service, and over the years more routes in the area were added.

In 2008, the VZO started operating in Rapperswil-Jona, where it now operates five routes of the Stadtbus Rapperswil-Jona on behalf of the municipality of Rapperswil-Jona.

== Operation ==
=== Service ===
The area served includes the municipalities of Bäretswil, Bubikon, Dürnten, Egg, Erlenbach, Fischenthal, Gossau ZH, Grüningen, Herrliberg, Hinwil, Hombrechtikon, Männedorf, Meilen, Mönchaltorf, Oetwil am See, Rapperswil-Jona, Rüti, Seegräben, Stäfa, Uetikon am See, Uster, Wald and Wetzikon.

In this area the company operates 55 daytime routes, and seven nighttime routes, with a total route length of 276 kilometres (171 mi). The routes are operated from depots in Grüningen, Wetzikon, Rüti and Meilen.

The Zürichsee and Obersee lakeshore on the northeastern side are also provided by the Verkehrsbetriebe Zürichsee und Oberland, furthermore the local buses within the localities Busskirch, Jona, Kempraten and Rapperswil of the municipality of Rapperswil-Jona in the canton of St. Gallen.

=== Fleet ===
The company operates a fleet of 88 buses, of which 48 are articulated buses, 35 are full-sized non-articulated buses, 3 are midibuses and 3 are minibuses. All buses are low-floored and have particulate filters. The standard livery is blue and grey, but buses used on the Rapperswil-Jona city bus network carry a red and grey scheme. Some buses carry non-standard colours.

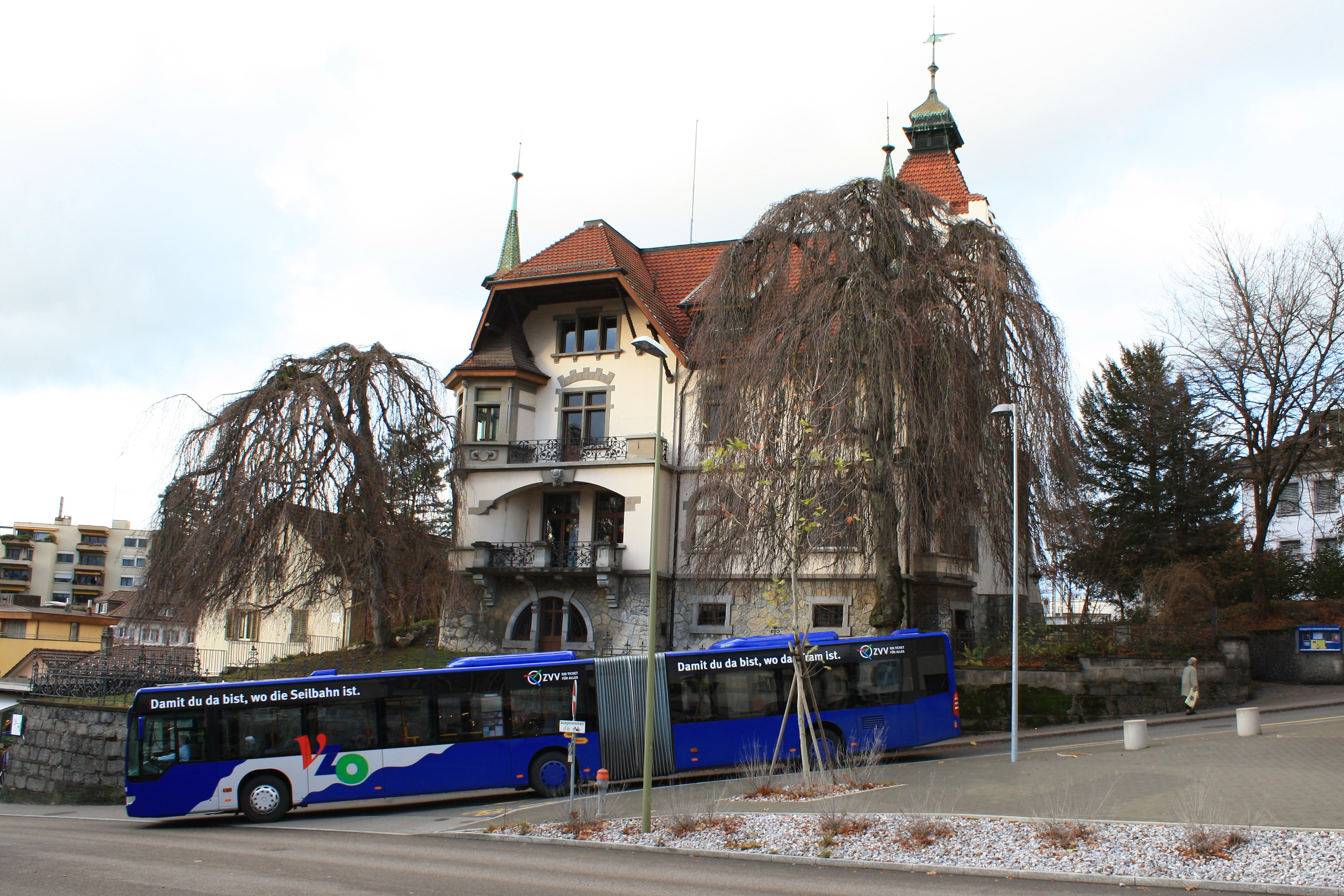
A bus in VZO blue in Rüti ZH

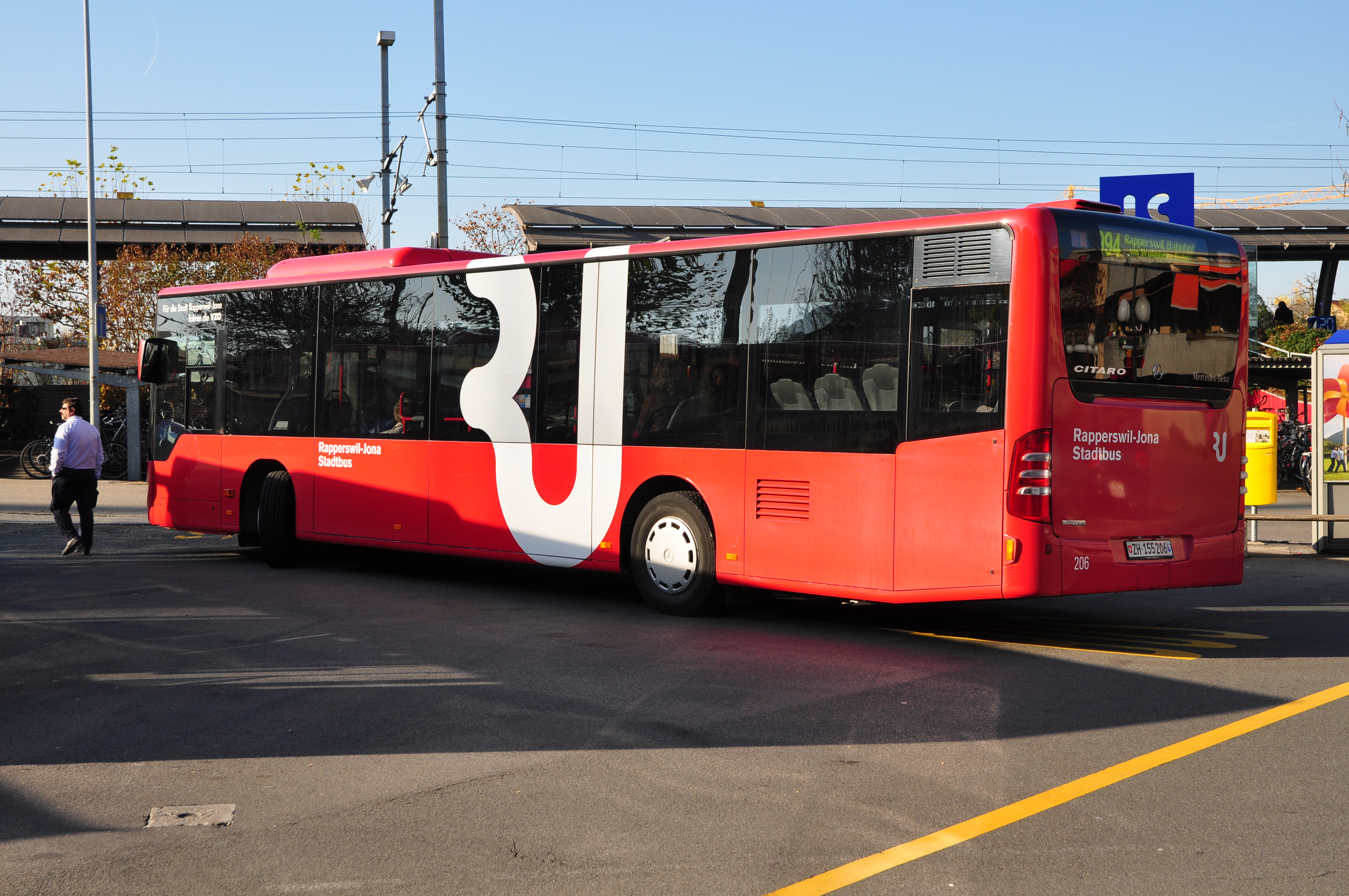
A bus in Stadtbus Rapperswil-Jona red

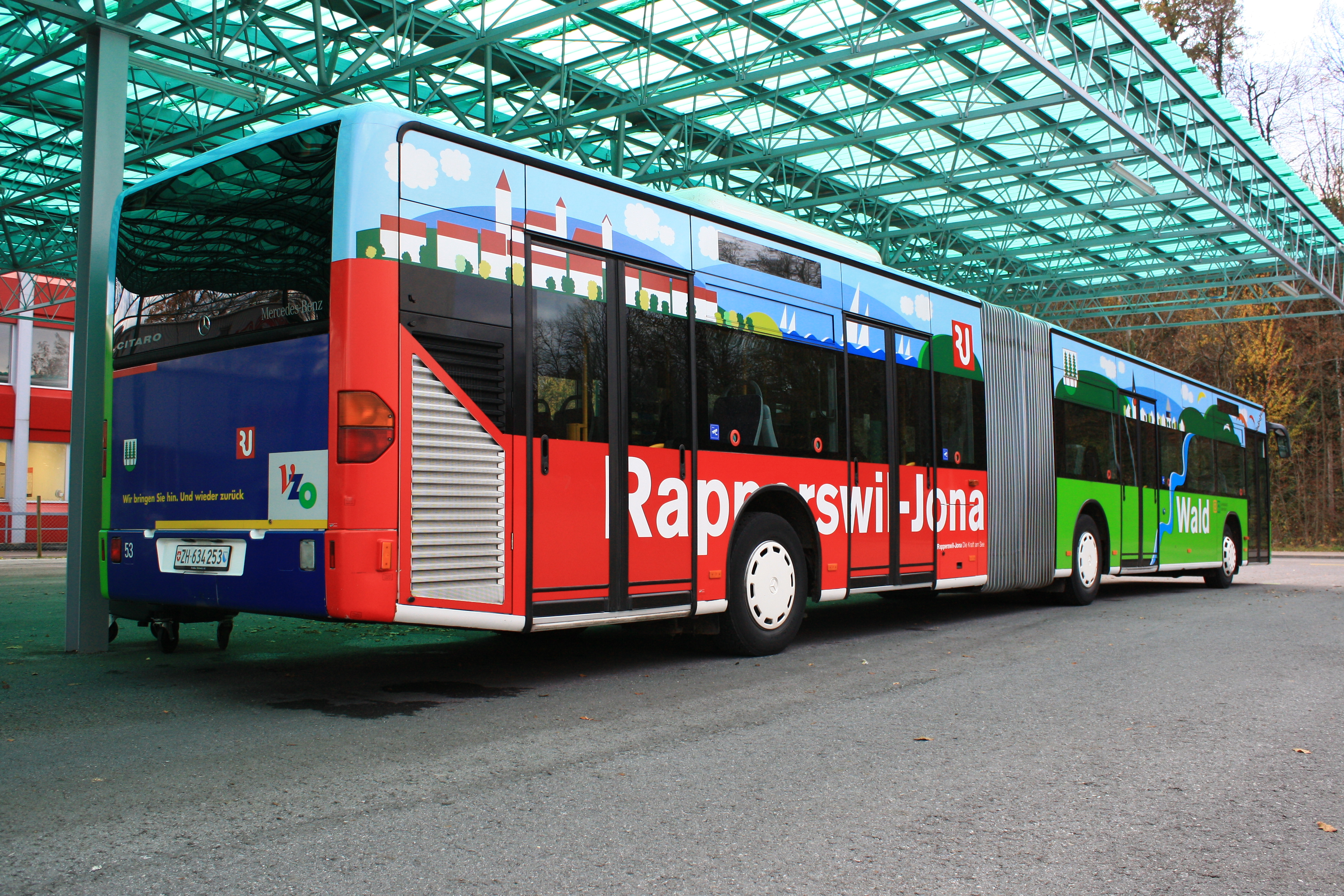
A bus in the VZO depot in Ruti ZH

== See also ==
- Transport in Switzerland
- List of bus operating companies in Switzerland
