= WAAS (disambiguation) =

WAAS is Wide Area Augmentation System, an air navigation aid to supplement GPS.

WAAS, Waas, or WaaS may also refer to:

== Computing ==
- Wide area application services, technology by Cisco Systems
- Windows as a service, a business model for Microsoft Windows 10
- Workspace as a Service, in desktop virtualization

== Other uses ==
- Waas (surname)
- Mount Waas, mountain in Grand County, Utah, US
- World Academy of Art and Science, an international organization
- Waas, the Shaetlan name for the village of Walls in Shetland
