= Coppenrath =

Coppenrath is a surname. Notable people with the surname include:

- George R. Coppenrath, American politician, member of the Vermont State Senate
- Gérald Coppenrath (1922–2008), French Polynesian lawyer and politician
- Hubert Coppenrath (1930–2022), French Polynesian Roman Catholic archbishop
- Michel-Gaspard Coppenrath (1924–2008), French Resistance member and French Polynesian Roman Catholic archbishop
- Taylor Coppenrath (born 1981), American basketball player

== See also ==
- Coppenrath Verlag, a German publishing house based in Münster
- Coppenrath & Wiese, a German food company
