= Ottikon =

Ottikon may refer to:

- Ottikon (Gossau), a settlement in the municipality of Gossau, Canton of Zürich, Switzerland
- Ottikon (Illnau-Effretikon), a settlement in the municipality of Illnau-Effretikon, Canton of Zürich, Switzerland
