= Uli Waas =

German writer and illustrator (born 1949)

Uli Waas (born 1949, in Donauwörth) is a German writer and illustrator. She has illustrated several school and children's books.

She studied Graphic design and Fine Arts at the Academy of Fine Arts, Munich.

== Books for children and teenagers ==
- Bärenjahr. Basteln, kochen, spielen - Ideen für 12 Monate. Carlsen Verlag, Reinbek 1988
- Bratapfel und Laterne. Ausgesuchte Lieder, Rätsel, Gedichte. Carlsen Verlag, Hamburg 1989
- Fröhlicher Advent. Ausgesuchte Lieder, Rätsel, Gedichte. Carlsen Verlag, Hamburg 1989
- Mia Maus feiert Geburtstag. Carlsen Verlag, Hamburg 1990
- Mia Maus Hat Ferien. Carlsen Verlag, Hamburg 1990
- Mia Maus im Kindergarten. Carlsen Verlag, Hamburg 1990
- Mia Maus ist krank. Carlsen Verlag, Hamburg 1990
- Winter-Allerlei. Lieder, Rätsel, Gedichte. Carlsen Verlag, Hamburg 1991
- Molly ist weg. Eine wahre Hundegeschichte. Reihe: Ich lese selber. Nord-Süd Verlag, Gossau Zürich 1993
- Ich schmücke meinen Weihnachtsbaum. Mit Spielelementen zum Herausnehmen. Ed. Bücherbär, Würzburg 2003
- Komm mit nach Bethlehem. Adventskalender. Coppenrath Verlag, Münster 2002
- Bescherung im Wald. Coppenrath Verlag, Münster 2003
- Die Tiere schmücken den Weihnachtsbaum. Coppenrath Verlag, Münster 2004
- Julia ruft 112. Eine Feriengeschichte. Kinderbrücke, Weiler i.A. 2004
- 1-1-2, Hilfe kommt herbei. Hilfe holen mit der Notrufnummer. Ed. Bücherbär, Würzburg 2005
- Bescherung mit Engelschlitten. Coppenrath Verlag, Münster 2007

== External links and references ==
Literature by and about Uli Waas in the German National Library catalogue
