= Uster–Oetwil tramway =

Tramway line in Zurich, Switzerland

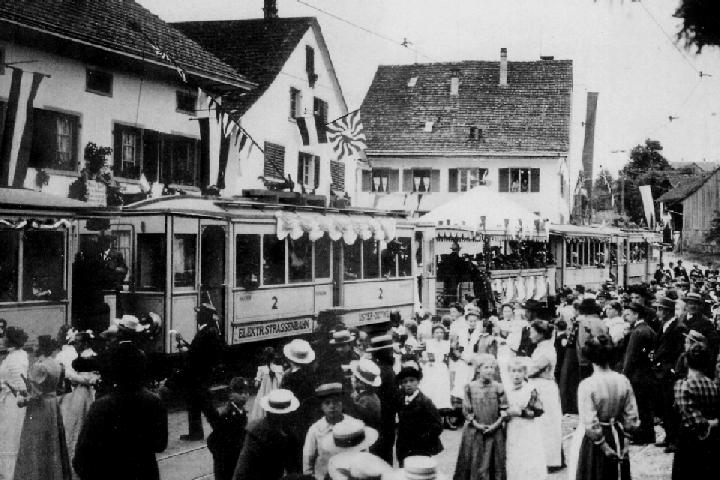
- Opening of the UOeB at Oetwil in 1909

Overview
- Status: Closed and removed
- Locale: Canton of Zürich, Switzerland
- Termini: Uster; Oetwil
- Stations: 18

Service
- Services: 1
- Depot(s): near Uster

History
- Opened: 1909
- Closed: 1949

Technical
- Line length: 10.5 kilometres (6.5 mi)
- Track gauge: 1,000 mm (3 ft 3 3/8 in) metre gauge
- Minimum radius: 30 metres (98 ft)
- Electrification: 800 V, DC, overhead
- Maximum incline: 7%

The Uster–Oetwil tramway (German: Uster-Oetwil-Bahn, UOeB) was a metre gauge rural electric tramway in the Swiss canton of Zürich. It linked the town of Uster with Esslingen and Oetwil in the Zürcher Oberland.

The UOeB had an interchange with the main line at Uster station, on the Wallisellen to Rapperswil line. It also had track connections with two other metre gauge rural lines, the Wetzikon-Meilen-Bahn (WMB), at Langholz, and the Forchbahn (FB), at Esslingen. Through the FB, the WMB had an indirect metre gauge connection to the Zürich city tram network.

The line was electrified at 800 V DC. It had a length of 10.5 kilometres (6.5 mi), with 18 stops, a maximum gradient of 7% and a minimum radius of 30 metres (98 ft). Of the lines total length, all but 100 metres (330 ft) ran in the street.

The line opened on 28 May 1909. It survived until 10 January 1949, when it was replaced by a bus service operated by the Verkehrsbetriebe Zürichsee und Oberland (VZO).

The line's headquarters and workshops were located near Uster, with an additional depot at Langholz. Both buildings still exist, in other uses, together with a goods shed at Mönchaltorf.
