= Wetzikon–Meilen tramway =

Tramway line in Zurich, Switzerland

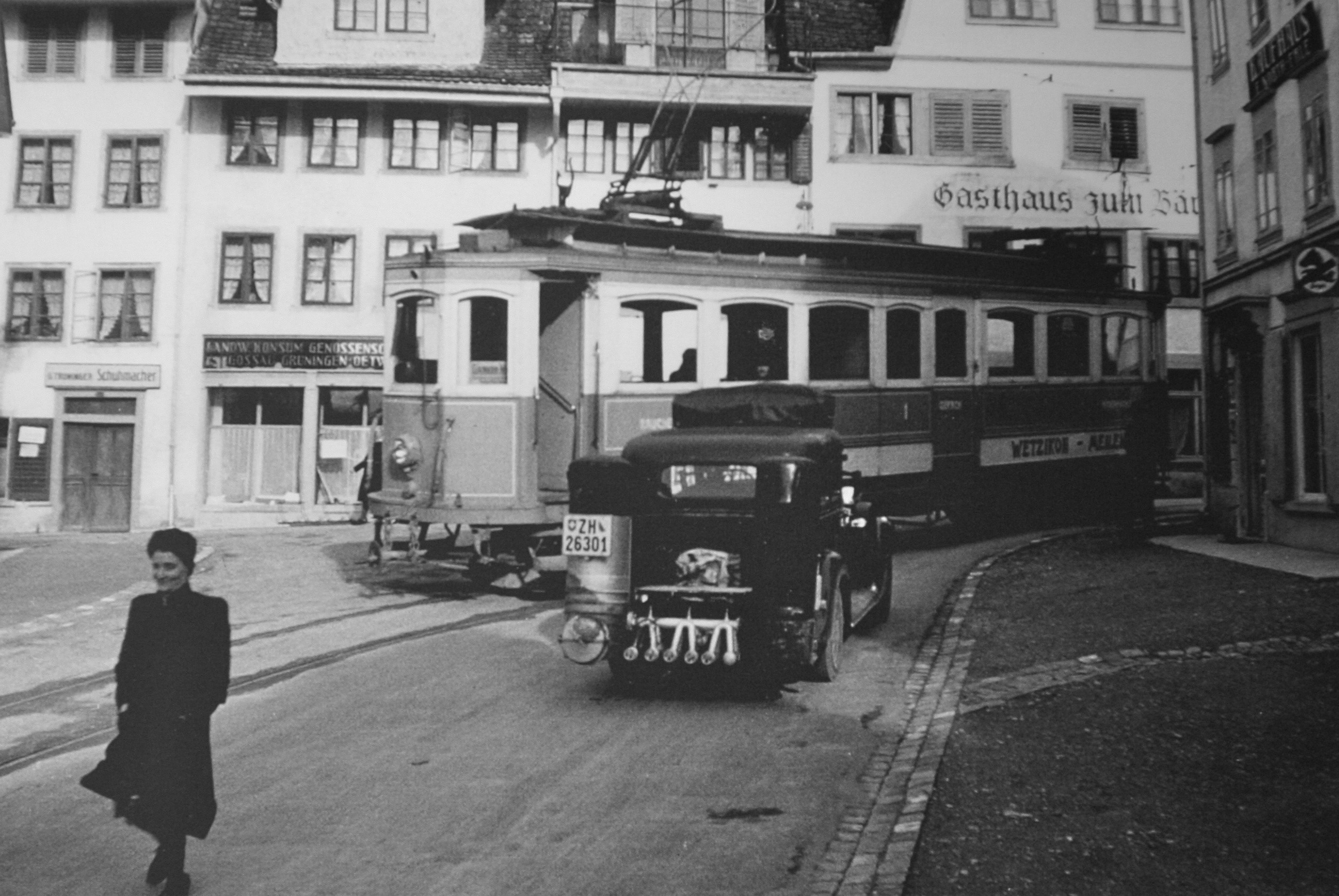
- A WMB tram in Grüningen

Overview
- Status: Closed and removed
- Locale: Canton of Zürich, Switzerland
- Termini: Kempten; Meilen
- Stations: 24

Service
- Services: 1
- Depot(s): Grüningen, Wetzikon, Meilen

History
- Opened: 1903
- Closed: 1950

Technical
- Line length: 22.5 kilometres (14.0 mi)
- Track gauge: 1,000 mm (3 ft 3 3/8 in) metre gauge
- Minimum radius: 25 metres (82 ft)
- Electrification: 750 V, DC, overhead
- Maximum incline: 6.5%

The Wetzikon–Meilen tramway (German: Wetzikon-Meilen-Bahn, WMB) was a metre gauge rural electric tramway in the Swiss canton of Zürich. It linked the town of Meilen, on the shore of Lake Zürich, with Wetzikon and Kempten in the Zürcher Oberland.

The WMB had interchanges with the main line at Meilen station, on the Lake Zürich right bank line, at Wetzikon station, on the Wallisellen to Rapperswil line, and at Kempten station, on the Effretikon to Hinwil line. It also had a track connection with another metre gauge rural tramway, the Uster-Oetwil-Bahn (UOeB), at Langholz. Through the UOeB, the WMB had indirect metre gauge connections to the Forchbahn and the Zürich city tram network.

The tramway was opened on 3 January 1903, with termini on the lakeside in Meilen and at Kempten. The section between Meilen lakeside and Meilen station closed on 3 October 1931, followed on 14 May 1939 by the section between Wetzikon and Kempten. The rump of the line survived until 13 May 1950, when it was replaced by a bus service operated by the Verkehrsbetriebe Zürichsee und Oberland (VZO).

The line was electrified at 750 V DC. It had a length of 22.5 kilometres (14.0 mi), with 24 stops, a maximum gradient of 6.5% and a minimum radius of 25 metres (82 ft). Of the lines total length, 18.3 kilometres (11.4 mi) ran in the street, with the remainder on its own dedicated right of way. Apart from one small concrete bridge, there were no significant engineering structures.

The line's headquarters and workshops were located at Grüningen, with additional depots at Wetzikon and Meilen. The Grüningen site still exists and, with significant rebuilding, is now the headquarters of the VZO. Station buildings also exist at Uetikon, Männedorf, Oetwil am See, Ottikon and Gossau, together with a goods shed at Grüt.

None of the WMB rolling stock has survived. A tram car is displayed at the VZO's Grüningen site, in the colour scheme of the WMB and carrying the markings of car CFe 4/4 2 of 1903. However this is in fact Trogenerbahn BDe 4/4 23, a largely identical car that never actually operated on the WMB.

== Gallery ==
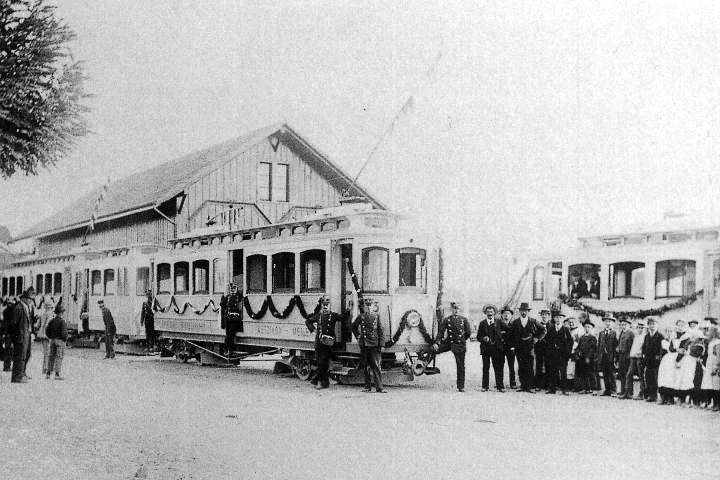
Opening of the line at Wetzikon

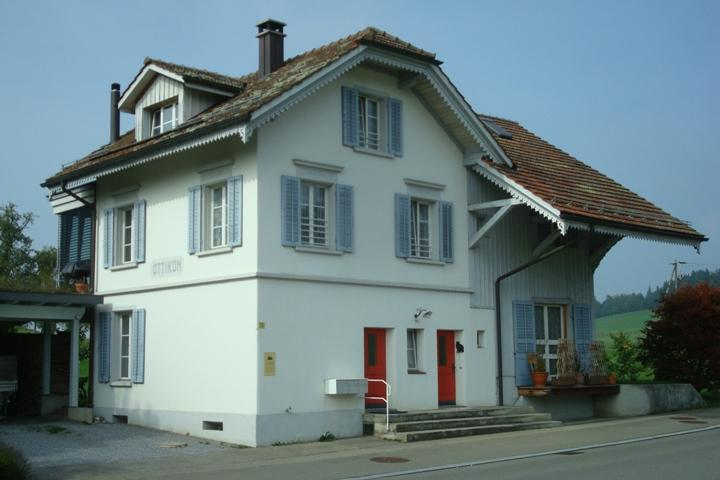
Old station building at Ottikon

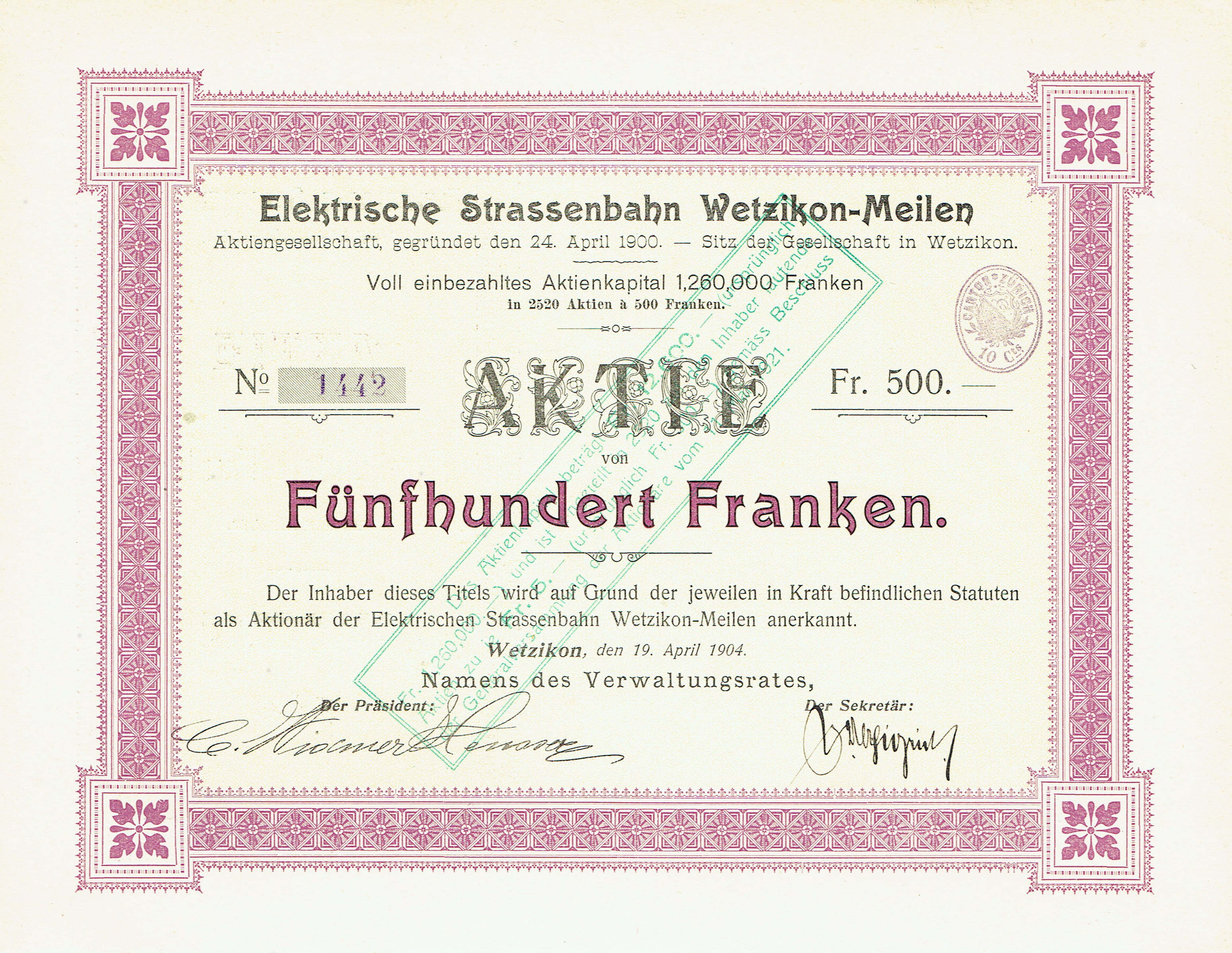
Share of the Elektrische Strassenbahn Wetzikon-Meilen AG, issued 19. April 1904
