= Annette Langen =

German writer

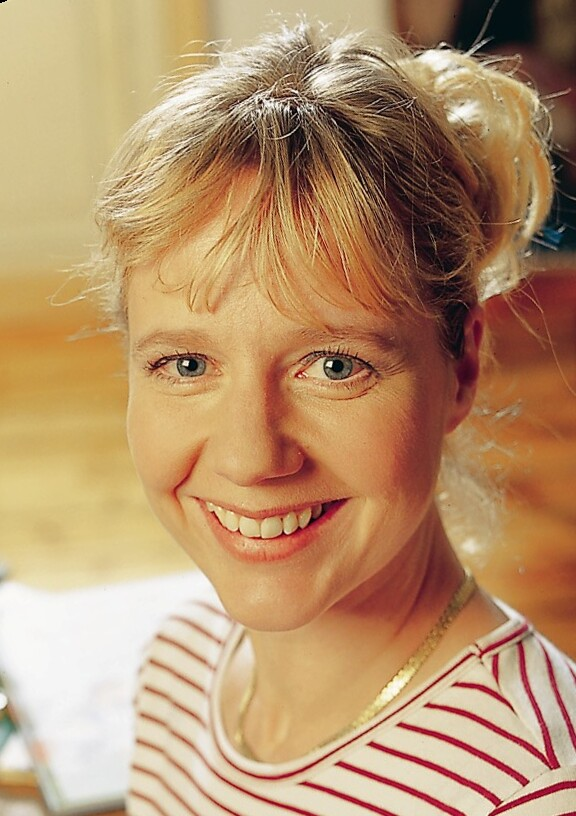
Annette Langen

Annette Langen (born April 29, 1967, in Leverkusen) is a German writer of children's and young adults literature. Since 1989, she has published over 100 books; parts of her work have been translated into over 30 languages. Her best-known work is the children's book series Letters from Felix, which has been published since 1994, about a traveling stuffed rabbit.

== Life and career ==
Langen was born in Leverkusen and grew up in a family of booksellers in Leichlingen in the region of Rhineland, Germany. After graduating from high school, she trained as a bookseller and then went to the U.S. to attend the Radcliffe Publishing Course. Back in Germany, she became a commissioning editor in a children's book publishing house for many years. It was at this time that she began writing her first children's books. She has been a freelance author since 2000. Annette Langen has a daughter and a son and lives in Bergisches Land.

Her breakthrough came in 1994 with the book Letters from Felix, illustrated by Constanza Droop, which was honored by the Society for Youth and Social Research as a "Pedagogically Valuable Picture Book" and was repeatedly included in excerpts in school textbooks and teaching materials. In Israel, Letters from Felix was the first German book after 1945 to reach the bestseller lists. To date, several serialized volumes and non-fiction books have been published, as well as a world atlas for children, plus audio books, games, several television and cinema adaptations, and a musical.

Another series was created starting in 2000 with "Die kleine Motzkuh" (The Little Grumpy Cow), illustrated by Imke Sönnichsen and Dorothea Ackroyd, in which intra-family conflicts are addressed with humor and solutions are shown. In the book "Der kleine Herr G.Ott oder wie die Welt ein bisschen besser werden könnte" ( Little Mr. G.Ott or How the World Could Be a Little Better), published in 2010, current topics such as religion, war and peace are dealt with from a child's perspective.

In addition to writing, Annette Langen has been involved in projects to promote reading and the integration of children on a voluntary basis for many years: in 2001, for example, she took over the volunteer patronage of an elementary school in Solingen, since 2011 she has been a reading ambassador for Germany's Stiftung Lesen (German Reading Foundation) and since 2012 she has been the patron of a mentoring project in Coesfeld. Since 2014 she has become member to Soroptimist International, a worldwide volunteer service organization for women. As part of a campaign for World Book Day, her book Im Bann des Tornados (Under the Spell of the Tornado) was published in 2016 and distributed in a print run of 1.2 million copies.

== Awards and honors ==
- Book of the Year / Flying Turtle Award in Iran for Letters from Felix, Book City and The Research Quarterly of Children and Youth's Literature, February 2015
- ITB Berlin Book Award for Letters from Felix in 2014
- Book of the Month for Unsere eigene Weihnachtsgeschichte, Institut für Jugendliteratur, Vienna, December, 2012
- Golden Record (Goldene Schalplatte) for Letters from Felix, presented at the Leipzig Book Fair, 2010
- Decade-Project Education for Sustainable Development (Dekade-Projekt Bildung fűr nachhaltige Entwicklung) through UNESCO for the first Felix Naturetrail in Germany, opened in Bonn, Germany, 2008
- Favorite Choice for Felix bei den Kindern der Welt (Buchliebling), Association of Austrian Publishers, (Buchverband Austria), 2006
- North Rhine-Westphalia Prize “Art and Culture for Children and Adolescents” Artists meet with Children and Adolescents—Annette Langen's Project for Solingen Elementary School, Solingen Germany, 2005
- “Feather of the Month” (Pluim van de maand/Feder des Monats) award for the book Letters from Felix, Netherlands, 1995

== Selected works ==
- I Won't Comb My Hair. North-South Books Inc. 2010. ISBN 978-0735823150.
- Felix Joins the Circus. New York: Abbeville Publishing Group. 2000. ISBN 978-0789206329.
- Felix: What Time Is It?. New York: Abbeville Publishing Group. 1999. ISBN 978-0789205629.
- Felix's Christmas Around the World. New York: Abbeville Publishing Group. 1998. ISBN 978-0789204523.
- Felix Explores Planet Earth. New York: Abbeville Publishing Group. 1997. ISBN 978-0789203205.
- Pippo: A Little Dog Finds a Home. New York: Abbeville Publishing Group. 1995. ISBN 978-0789200716.
- Felix Travels Back in Time. New York: Abbeville Publishing Group. 1995. ISBN 978-0789200020.
- Letters from Felix. New York: Abbeville Publishing Group. 1994. ISBN 978-1875633623.

== See also ==
- List of animated feature films: 2005
- List of animated feature films: 2006
