= Grüningen =

- Municipality
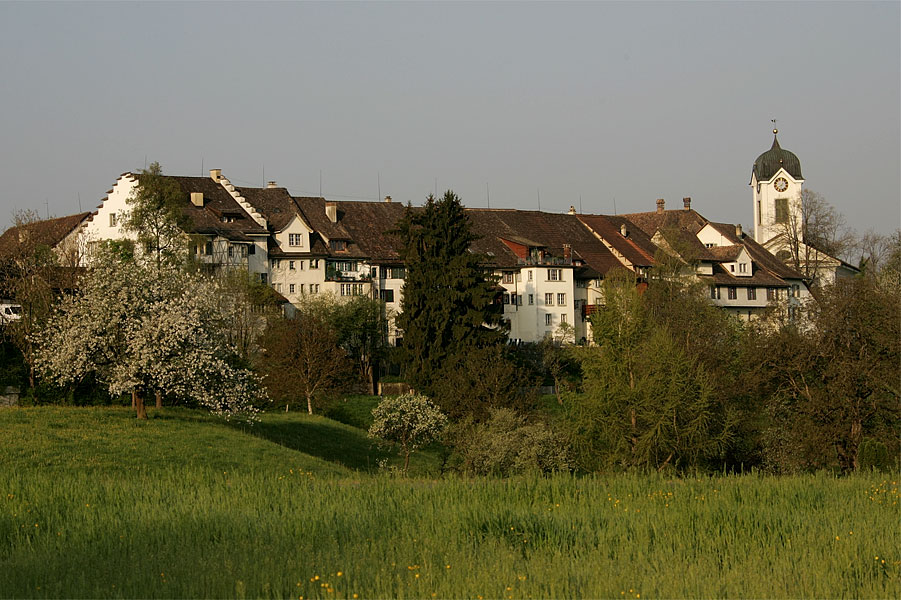

- Flag Coat of arms
- Location of Grüningen
- Location within Switzerland Location within Canton of Zürich
- Coordinates: 47°17′N 8°46′E
- Country: Switzerland
- Canton: Zürich
- District: Hinwil

Area
  - Total: 8.77 km^{2} (3.39 sq mi)
- Elevation: 502 m (1,647 ft)

Population (December 2020)
  - Total: 3,716
  - Density: 424/km^{2} (1,100/sq mi)
- Time zone: UTC+01:00 (CET)
  - Summer (DST): UTC+02:00 (CEST)
- Postal code: 8627
- SFOS number: 116
- ISO 3166 code: CH-ZH
- Surrounded by: Gossau, Bubikon, Hombrechtikon, Oetwil am See, Egg
- Website: www.grueningen.ch

Grüningen is a town and municipality in the district of Hinwil in the canton of Zürich in Switzerland, notable for its well-preserved historic nucleus.

== History ==
Grüningen is first mentioned in 1243 as apud Gruningin. The village of Itzikon was first mentioned in 837 as in Izinheimo and Binzikon was mentioned in 854 as in willa Pinuzzinhovun.

In the Strangenholz area of the municipality, burial mounds from a Hallstatt era population have been found. The Alamannic settlement dates to c. the 8th century, based on 9th-century records of Itzikon and Binzikon.

Grüningen castle was built from the early 13th century, most likely by the counts of Rapperswil, who acted as reeves for Einsiedeln Abbey. Grüningen is recorded as a possession of Einsiedeln during 1217–1222. Around 1230, Grüningen passed from Einsiedeln to the Abbey of Saint Gall and was at first given as a fief to the counts of Kyburg, and in 1253 to Lütold VI, head of the baronial Regensberg family. The small settlement that had grown up around the castle was developed into a medieval city, with fortifications and market rights, around the mid 13th century, likely under Lütold VI. In 1269, Lütold was forced to cede the fief back to St. Gallen, as he was in financial difficulties following his feuds with both the city of Zürich and with count Rudolf von Habsburg The abbey pawned the fief to Walter von Elgg in 1273, but it was acquired by Rudolf von Habsburg, now elected King Rudolf I of Germany, in the following year.

Grüningen held city rights since before 1370 (first record of the city seal and coat of arms), as one of four localities in the canton of Zürich which held city rights before the end of the medieval period, the other three being Zürich itself (1218), Winterthur (1264) and Elgg (1371). The town remained in Habsburg possession throughout the 14th century, administered by the counts of Toggenburg from 1314, and by Heinrich Gessler of Meienberg from 1374. Gessler improved the castle fortifications against the threat of the Swiss Confederacy in the years leading up to the Sempach War, and Grüningen was raided several times by Zürich during the 1370s to 1380s.

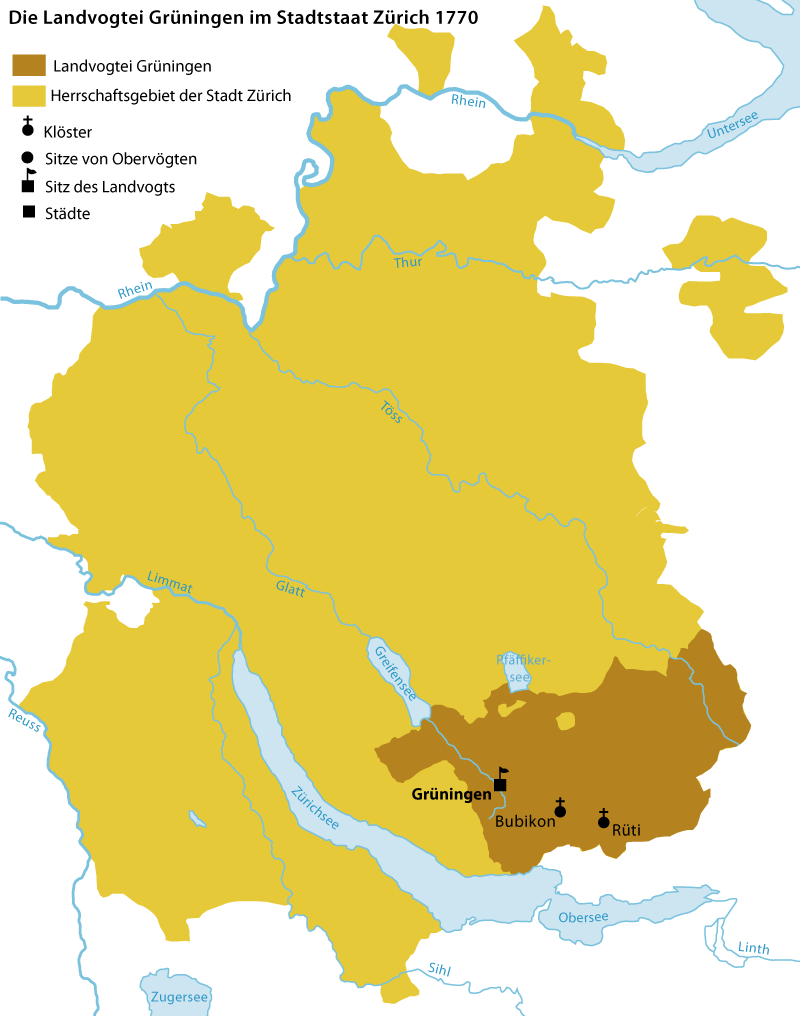
Grüningen bailiwick within the canton of Zürich (as of 1770)

Heinrich Gessler died in 1403 and was succeeded by his son Hermann, who was finally forced to cede Grüningen to Zürich. Heinrich Hagnauer was elected reeve in 1416. Hagnauer implemented a strict regime, creating resentment towards the new lords. Frederick IV of Habsburg was upset over the loss of the territory, and made several attempts to regain Grüningen from Zürich, but ultimately without success.

In 1440, Grüningen bailiwick was invaded by the forces of Schwyz and Glarus in the course of the Old Zürich War. A force of 1,000 laid siege to the town and castle, which were defended by Jakob Murer and a garrison of 40 men. The defenders surrendered on 10 November 1440, three weeks before Zürich was forced to sign the unfavourable peace of Lucerne, on 1 December 1440. Frederick V of Habsburg and III of Germany at this time requested the return of Grüningen to Habsburg, but the intercession of Bern, in the so-called Berner Spruch of 17 March 1441, prevented the loss of Grüningen (which would have left a Habsburg-owned enclave within the Swiss Confederacy after the re-admission of Zürich in 1450). With the renewed hostilities of 1443, Grüningen was besieged again, during 11 to 16 July, and the garrison surrendered once again. The attackers killed Zürich reeve Peter Kilchmann in spite of having offered safe conduct. The rest of the garrison retreated to Zürich, where they were imprisoned and fined for cowardice. With Grüningen in Swiss hands, the territory of Grüningen bailiwick was harried by Swiss troops led by Ital Reding. These laid siege to Greifensee in Mai 1444, where the entire garrison was killed upon surrendering. With the peace of 24 August 1450, Grüningen was returned to Zürich, and would remained a bailiwick (Landvogtei) administrated by Zürich reeves until the French invasion of 1798.

Aerial view from 500 m by Walter Mittelholzer (1923)

Conrad Grebel (c. 1498–1526), co-founder of the Swiss Brethren movement, was likely a native of Grüningen.

The former bailiwick became the district (Oberamt) of Grüningen in 1815. Development stagnated in the 19th century, and Grüningen barely participated in the industrial revolution. As of 1836, there were 300 people employed in farming, 200 in the cotton and silk homeworking industry, and 112 in other crafts. In 1831, the administrative seat of the district was moved to Hinwil. Population declined from c. 1,700 in 1850 to c. 1,200 in 1900. From 1836, there was a mail coach connecting Grüningen to Zürich, from 1838 one to Stäfa. Grüningen was on Wetzikon–Meilen tramway line, operating 1903–1950. Since 1950, Verkehrsbetriebe Zürichsee und Oberland have operated a bus service. Population grew slowly over the first half of the 20th century, back to c. 1,700 (the population of 1850) by about 1960. Population growth accelerated after c. 1960, passing the 3,000 mark by 2010. In 1976, Grüningen received the Wakker Prize for the development and preservation of its architectural heritage.

In order to protect the historic town nucleus from through traffic, a bypass has been planned from 2003. A project by Santiago Calatrava was presented as the winning submission in September 2018.

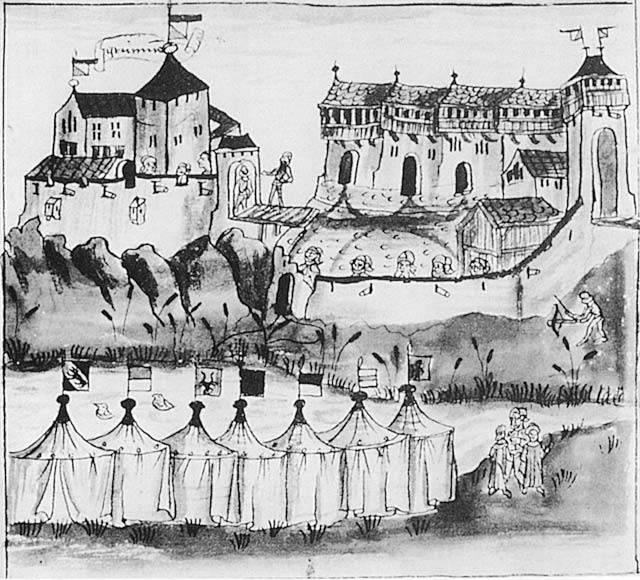
Siege of Grüningen in the Old Zürich War (15th century drawing)

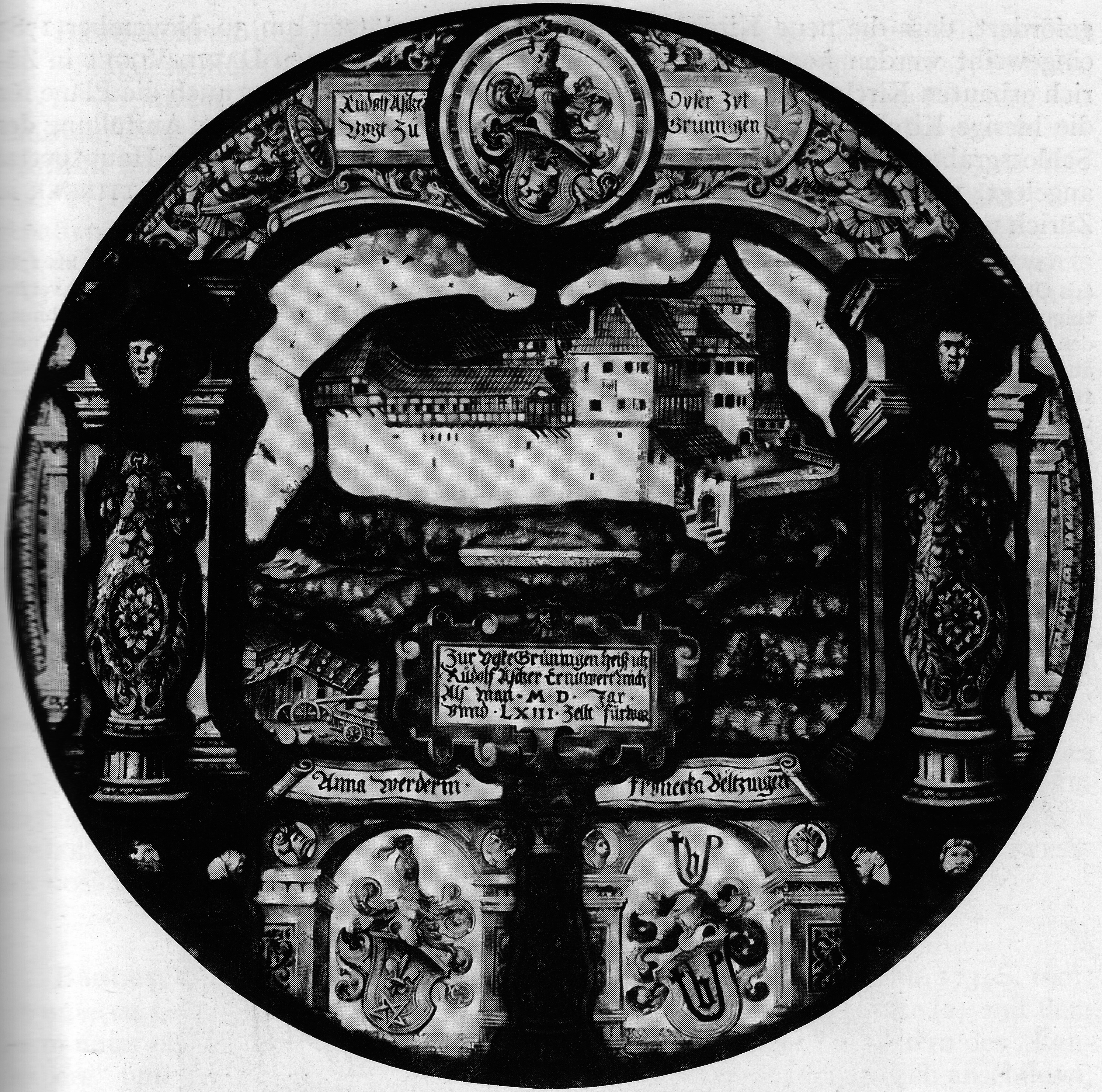
Wappenscheibe of the reeve of Grüningen, Rudolf Escher (1563)

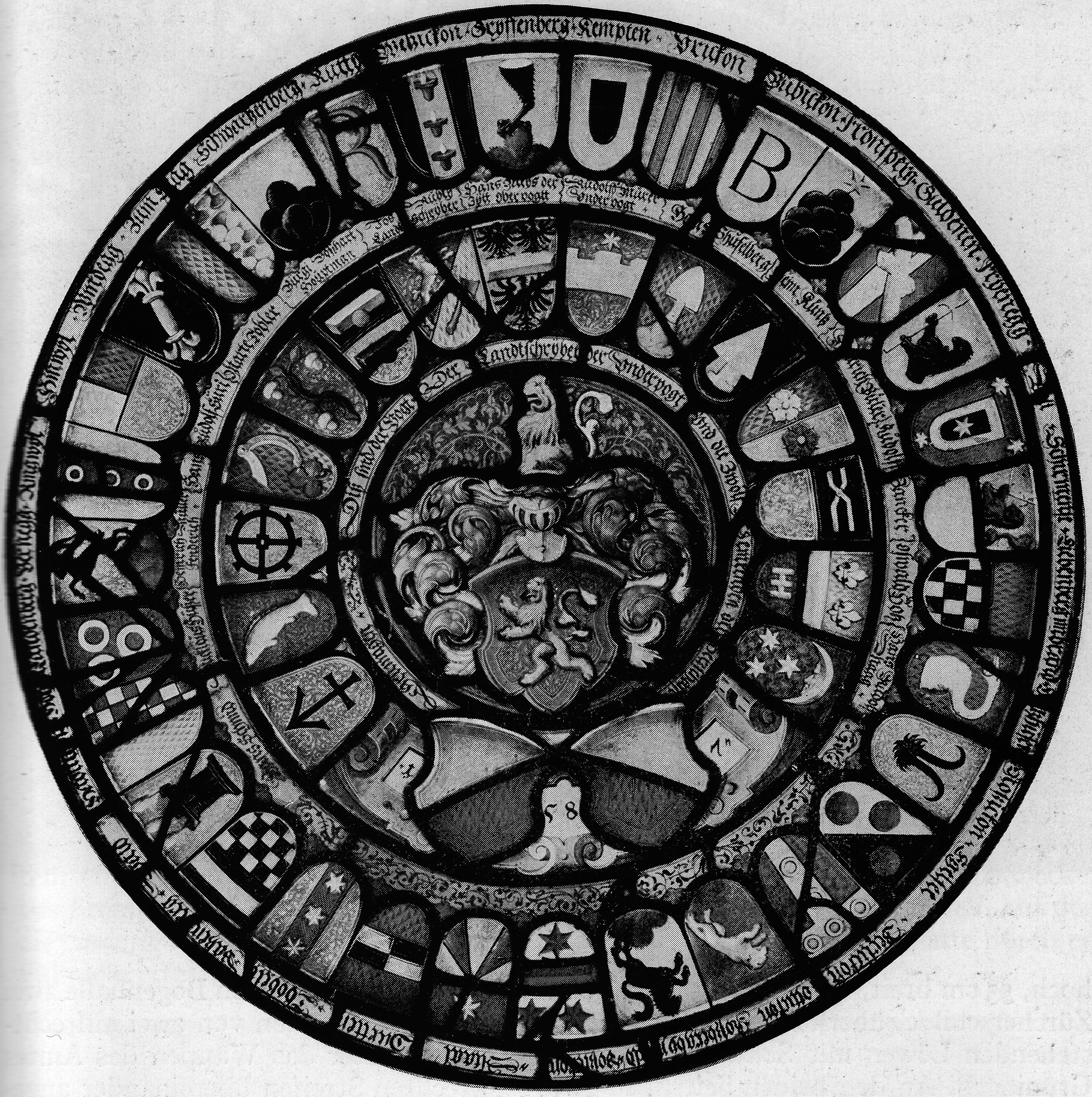
Wappenscheibe of Grüningen bailiwick (1587)

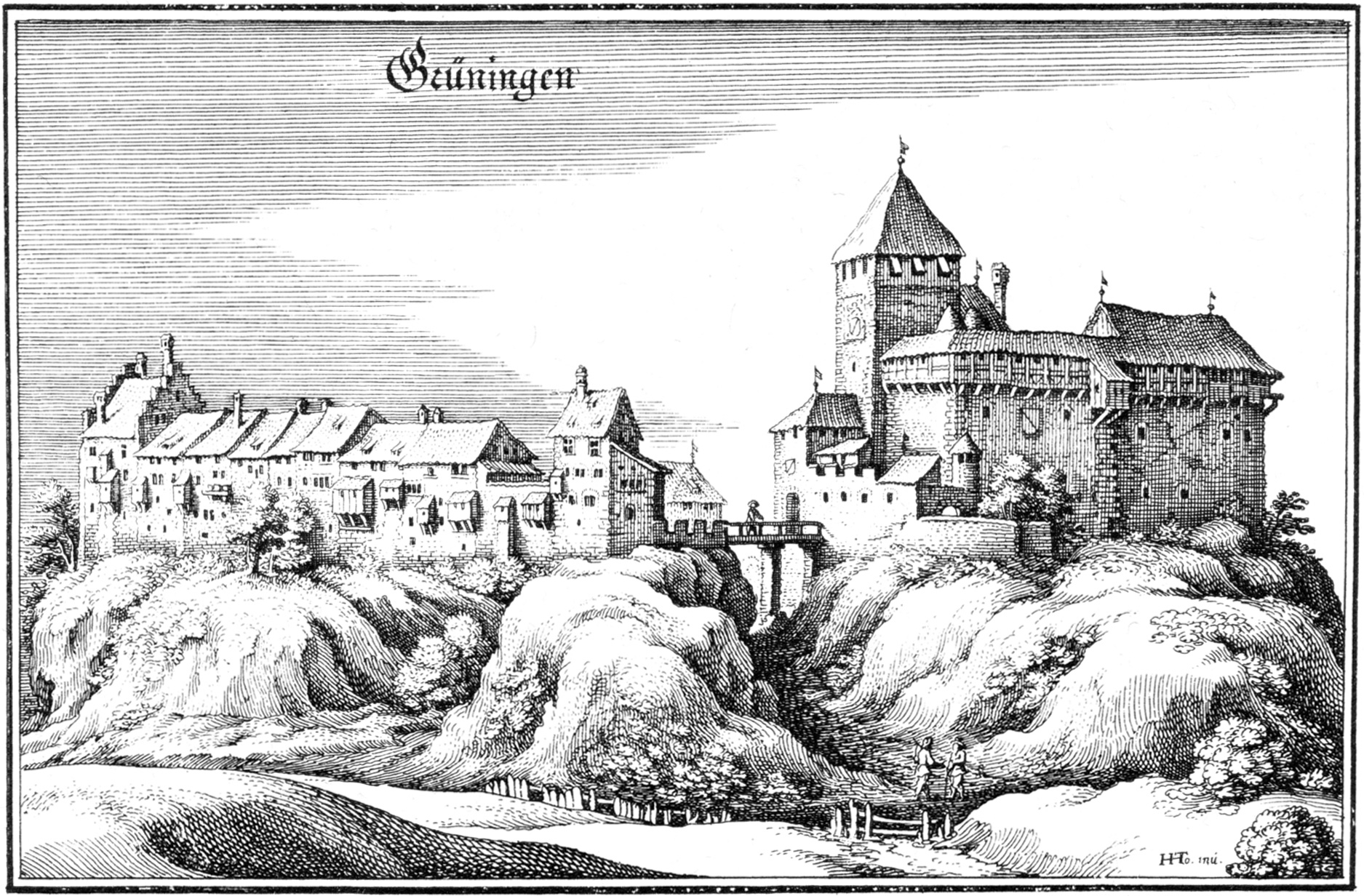
View of Grüningen town and castle (1654)

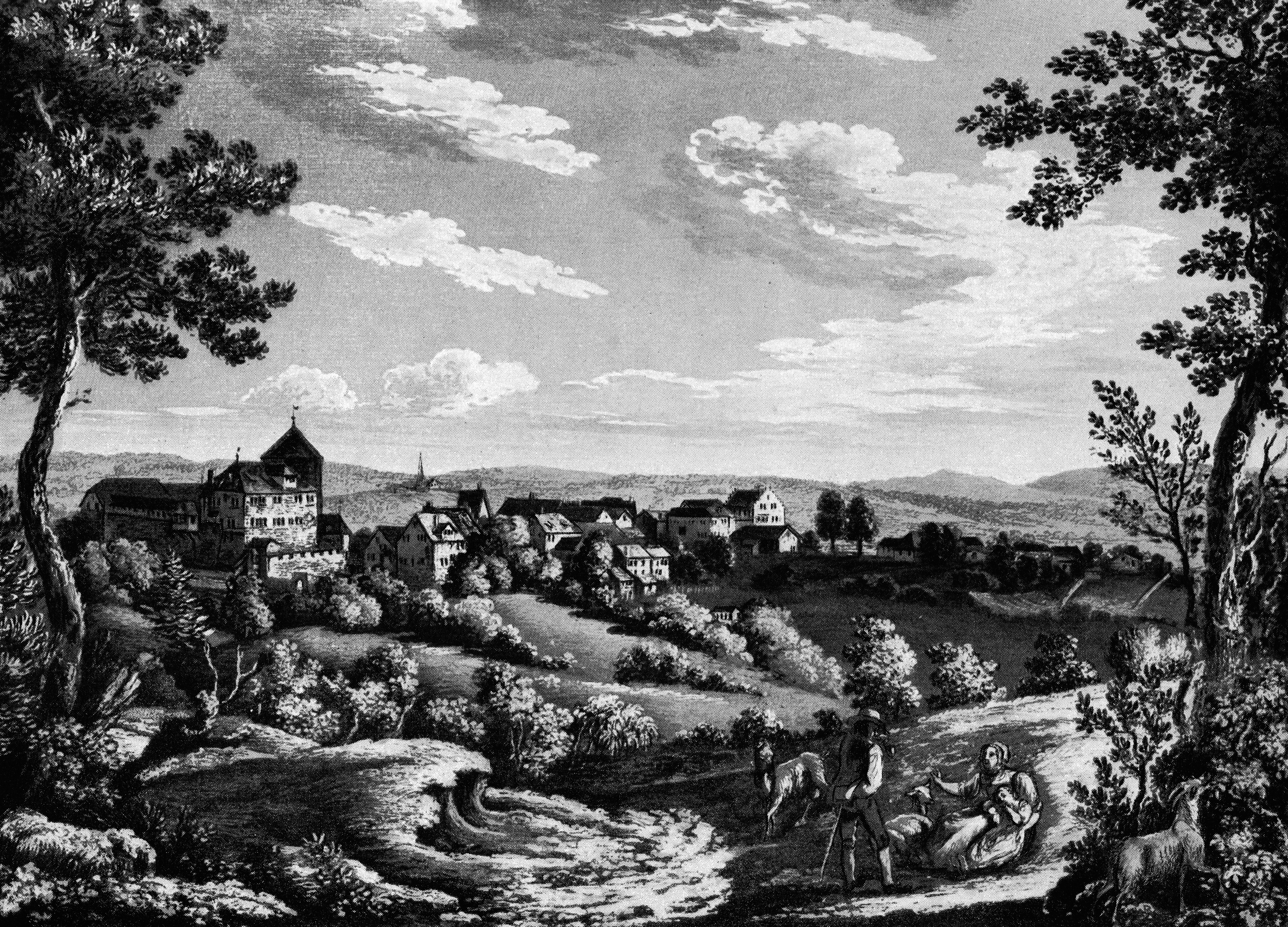
View of Grüningen town and castle (1845)

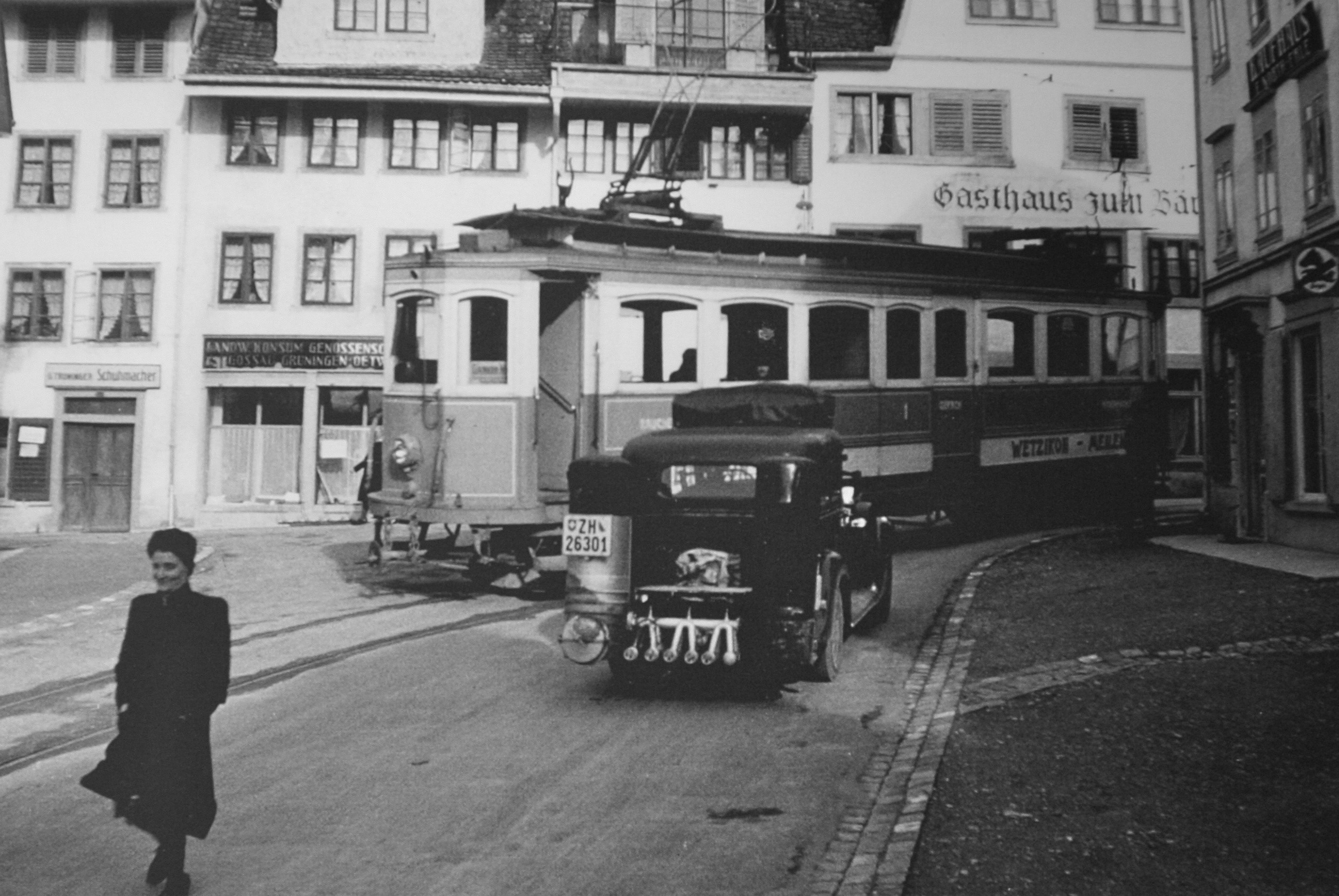
Wetzikon–Meilen tramway in Grüningen (c. 1930)

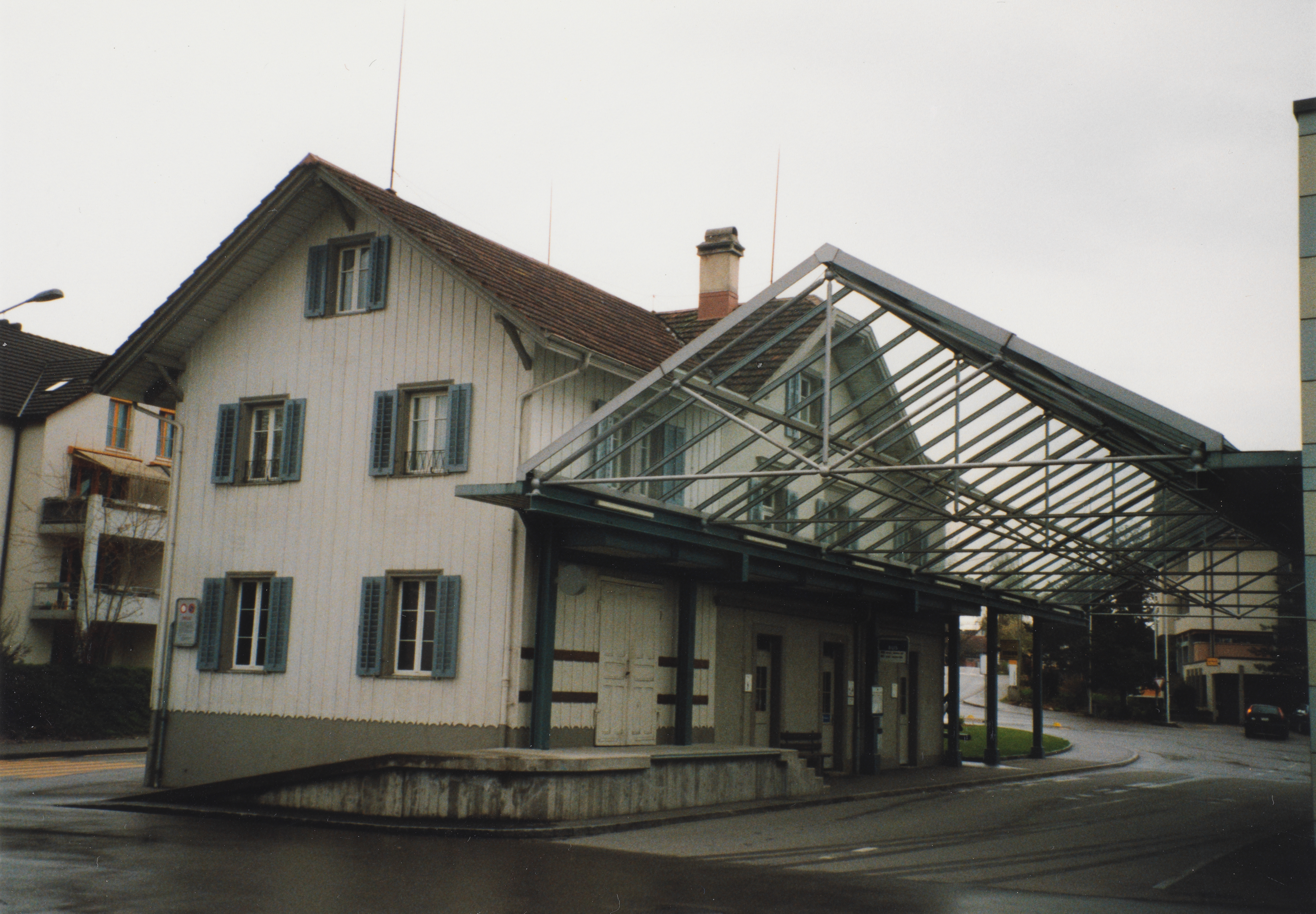
former railway station (closed 1950), current bus stop (1999)

== Geography ==
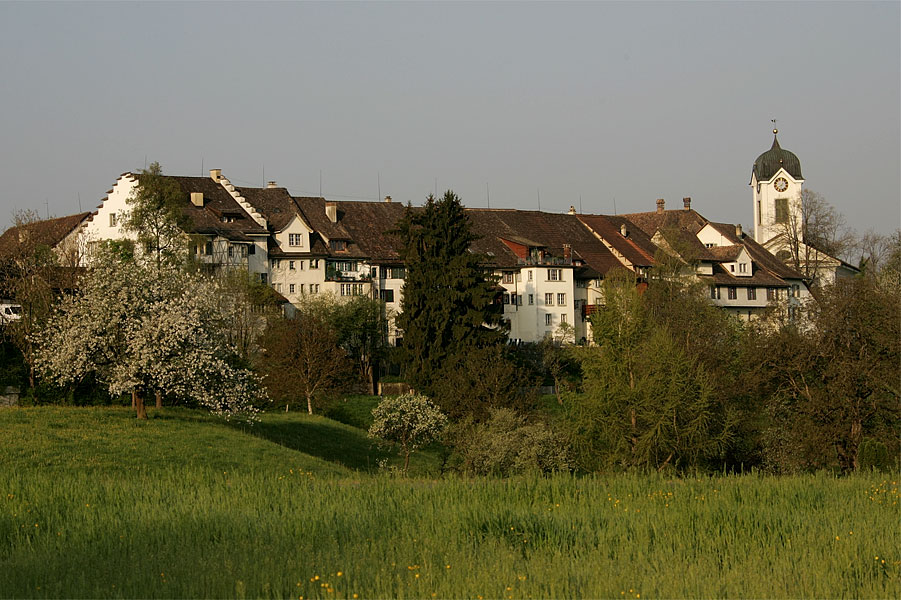
Grüningen (2007)

Grüningen municipality has an area of 8.8 km^{2} (3.4 sq mi). Of this area, 62.5% is used for agricultural purposes, while 20.5% is forested. Of the rest of the land, 14.6% is settled (buildings or roads) and the remainder (2.5%) is non-productive (rivers, glaciers or mountains). In 1996 housing and buildings made up 10.6% of the total area, while transportation infrastructure made up the rest (4%). Of the total unproductive area, water (streams and lakes) made up 0.5% of the area. As of 2007 9.2% of the total municipal area was undergoing some type of construction.

The municipality is located in the Zürcher Oberland and includes the town of Grüningen proper, besides the villages and hamlets of Itzikon, Binzikon, Bächelsrüti, Adeltshausen and Holzhausen as well as scattered individual houses.

== Wakker prize ==
The Wakker prize was awarded to Grüningen for the efforts that the Heimatschutzgesellschaft (Swiss heritage society) put into maintaining the historic appearance of the town. Their efforts included watching over any changes that were made to the city and presenting suggestions for improvement. They developed and staffed a local museum, presented cultural events and published information about the town's heritage.

== Demographics ==
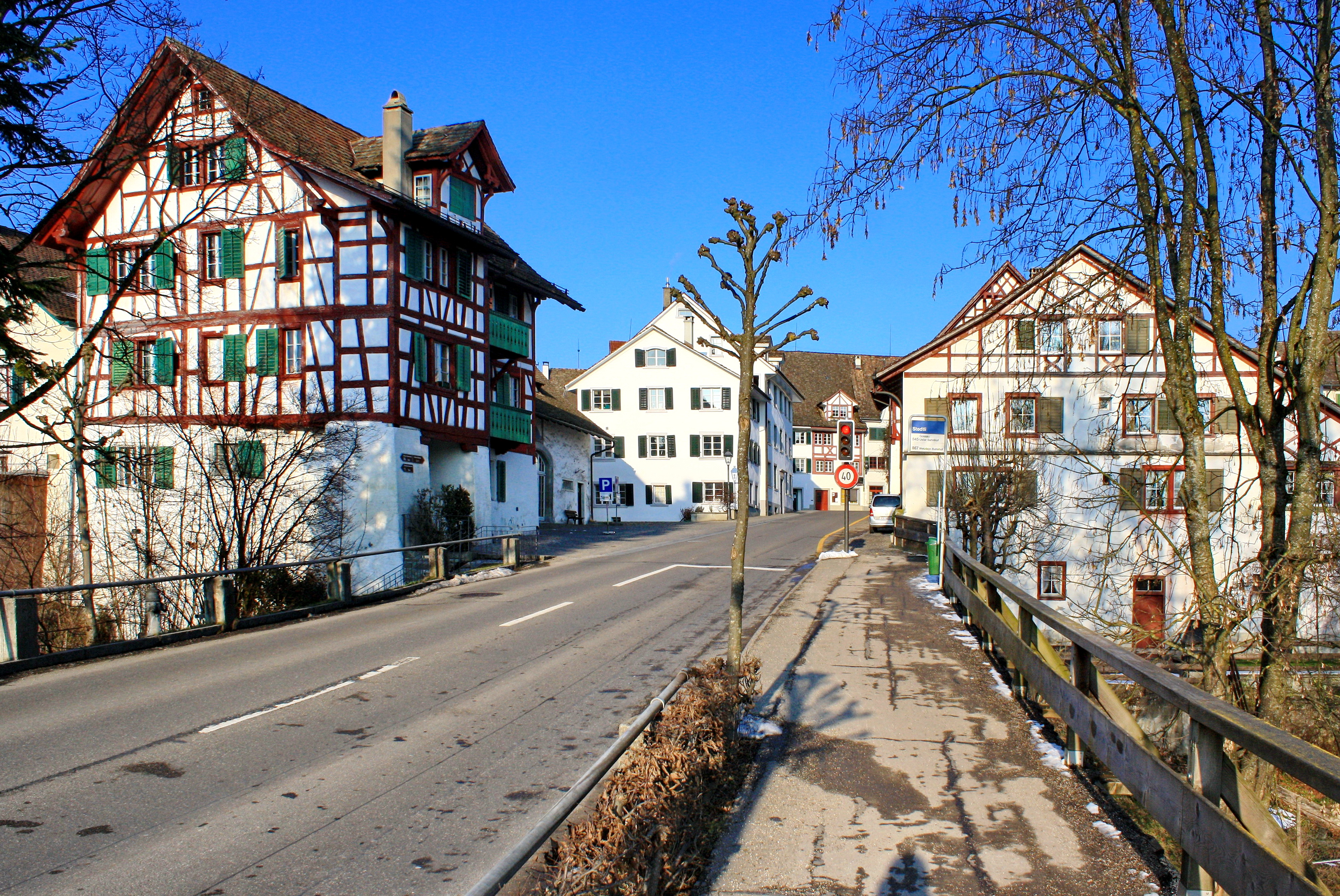
Timber framing houses in the Stedtli (2010)

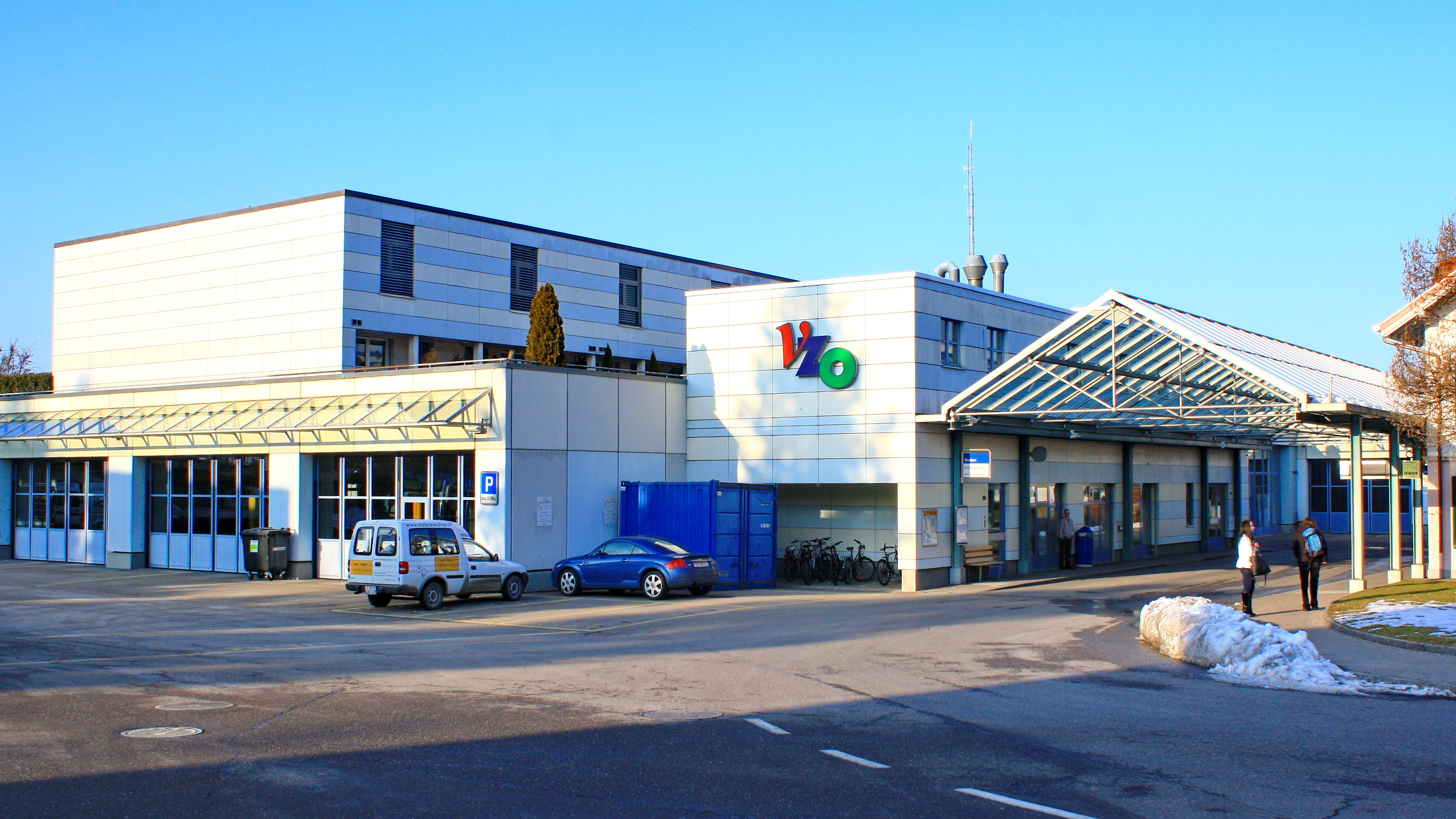
The headquarters of the Verkehrsbetriebe Zürichsee und Oberland (VZO) in Grüningen

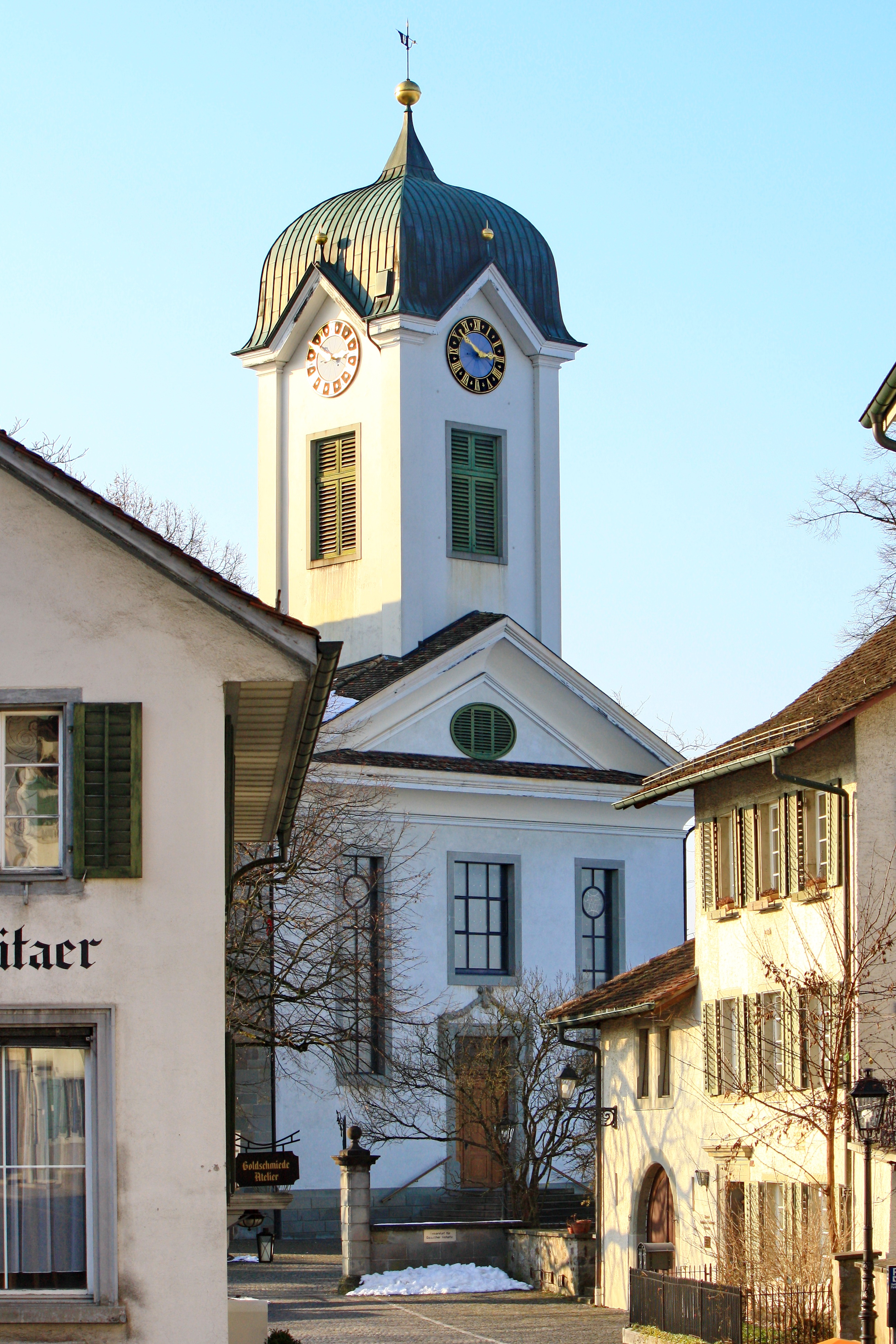
Reformed church

Grüningen has a population (as of 31 December 2020) of 3,716. As of 2007, 11.1% of the population was made up of foreign nationals. As of 2008 the gender distribution of the population was 49.6% male and 50.4% female. Over the last 10 years the population has grown at a rate of 4.4%. Most of the population (as of 2000) speaks German (92.0%), with Italian being second most common ( 1.9%) and English being third ( 1.3%).

In the 2007 election the most popular party was the SVP which received 43.5% of the vote. The next three most popular parties were the SPS (12.3%), the FDP (11.7%) and the CSP (11%).

The age distribution of the population (as of 2000) is children and teenagers (0–19 years old) make up 24.4% of the population, while adults (20–64 years old) make up 61.8% and seniors (over 64 years old) make up 13.8%. The entire Swiss population is generally well educated. In Grüningen about 75.2% of the population (between age 25-64) have completed either non-mandatory upper secondary education or additional higher education (either university or a Fachhochschule). There are 1135 households in Grüningen.

Grüningen has an unemployment rate of 1.36%. As of 2005, there were 136 people employed in the primary economic sector and about 49 businesses involved in this sector. 300 people are employed in the secondary sector and there are 36 businesses in this sector. 803 people are employed in the tertiary sector, with 88 businesses in this sector. As of 2007 46% of the working population were employed full-time, and 54% were employed part-time.

As of 2008 there were 663 Catholics and 1573 Protestants in Grüningen. In the 2000 census, religion was broken down into several smaller categories. From the 2000 census, 57.7% were some type of Protestant, with 53.3% belonging to the Swiss Reformed Church and 4.4% belonging to other Protestant churches. 25.7% of the population were Catholic. Of the rest of the population, 0% were Muslim, 3% belonged to another religion (not listed), 2.7% did not give a religion, and 10.2% were atheist or agnostic.

The historical population is given in the following table:

Year	Population
1467	38 households
1634	674
1739	1,040
1850	1,695
1900	1,207
1950	1,450
1990	2,597
2000	2,811
2010	3,165

== Climate ==
Grüningen has an average of 144.3 days of rain per year and on average receives 1,328 mm (52.3 in) of precipitation. The wettest month is August during which time Grüningen receives an average of 162 mm (6.4 in) of precipitation. During the wettest month, there is precipitation for an average of 14.3 days.

== Notable people ==
- Conrad Grebel (c. 1498–1526), a co-founder of the Swiss Brethren movement, probably born in Grüningen
