= Hinwil District =

Coordinates: 47°18′N 8°51′E

Hinwil District Bezirk Hinwil
- District
- Flag Coat of arms
- Country: Switzerland
- Canton: Zürich
- Capital: Hinwil

Area
  - Total: 179.53 km^{2} (69.32 sq mi)

Population (31 December 2020)
  - Total: 97,098
  - Density: 540.85/km^{2} (1,400.8/sq mi)
- Time zone: UTC+1 (CET)
  - Summer (DST): UTC+2 (CEST)
- Municipalities: 11

Hinwil District is one of the twelve districts of the German-speaking canton of Zurich, Switzerland. It lies southeast of the canton, bordering the adjacent St. Gallen. Hinwil has a population of 97,098 (as of 31 December 2020); its capital is the town of Hinwil, located at the centre of the district.

It was formed in 1831, when the administrative seat was moved to Hinwil from Grüningen. The district was known as Oberamt Grüningen from 1815–1831, which continued the historical bailiwick of Grüningen (1408–1798).

== Municipalities ==
Hinwil contains a total of eleven municipalities:

Municipality	Population (31 December 2020)	Area, km^{2}
Bäretswil	5,052	22.23
Bubikon	7,371	11.58
Dürnten	7,645	10.19
Fischenthal	2,501	30.25
Gossau	10,282	18.28
Grüningen	3,716	8.77
Hinwil	11,354	22.31
Rüti	12,494	10.19
Seegräben	1,427	3.75
Wald	10,200	25.25
Wetzikon	25,056	16.73
Total	97,098	179.53

== See also ==
- Municipalities of the canton of Zürich
