= Waas (surname) =

Waas is a surname. Notable people with the surname include:

- Herbert Waas (born 1963), German footballer
- Les Waas, creator of the Mister Softee jingle
- Murray Waas (born 1971), American investigative journalist
- Uli Waas (born 1949), German writer and illustrator
