= Oetwil am See =

- Municipality
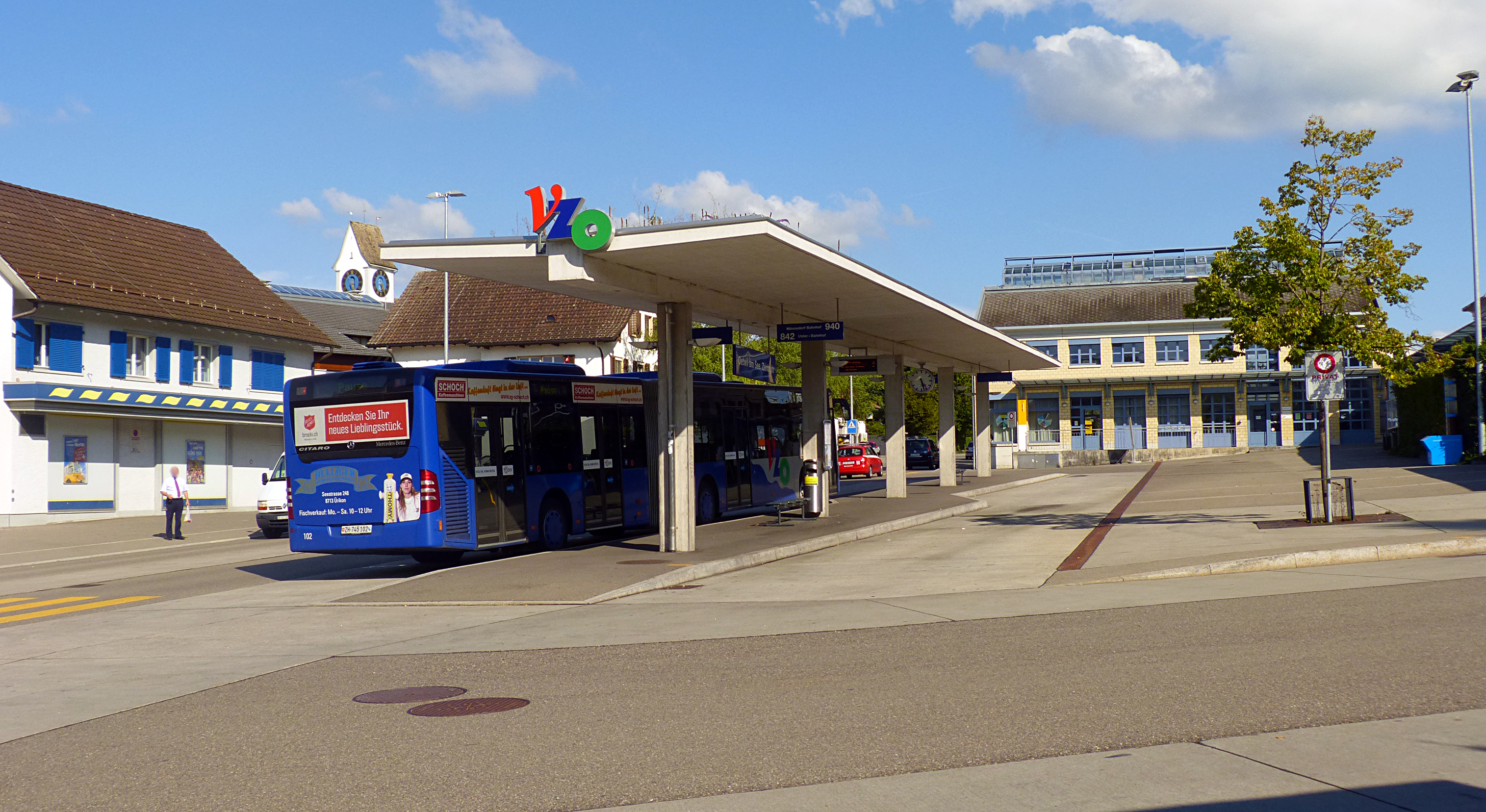

- Flag Coat of arms
- Location of Oetwil am See
- Location within Switzerland Location within Canton of Zurich
- Coordinates: 47°16′N 8°43′E
- Country: Switzerland
- Canton: Zurich
- District: Meilen

Government
  - Mayor: Namgyal Gangshontsang

Area
  - Total: 6.09 km^{2} (2.35 sq mi)
- Elevation: 538 m (1,765 ft)

Population (December 2020)
  - Total: 4,857
  - Density: 798/km^{2} (2,070/sq mi)
- Time zone: UTC+01:00 (CET)
  - Summer (DST): UTC+02:00 (CEST)
- Postal code: 8618
- SFOS number: 157
- ISO 3166 code: CH-ZH
- Surrounded by: Egg, Grüningen, Hombrechtikon, Männedorf, Stäfa, Uetikon am See
- Website: www.oetwil.ch

Oetwil am See is a municipality in the district of Meilen in the canton of Zürich in Switzerland. It is located in the Pfannenstiel region.

== History ==
Aerial view by Walter Mittelholzer (1932)

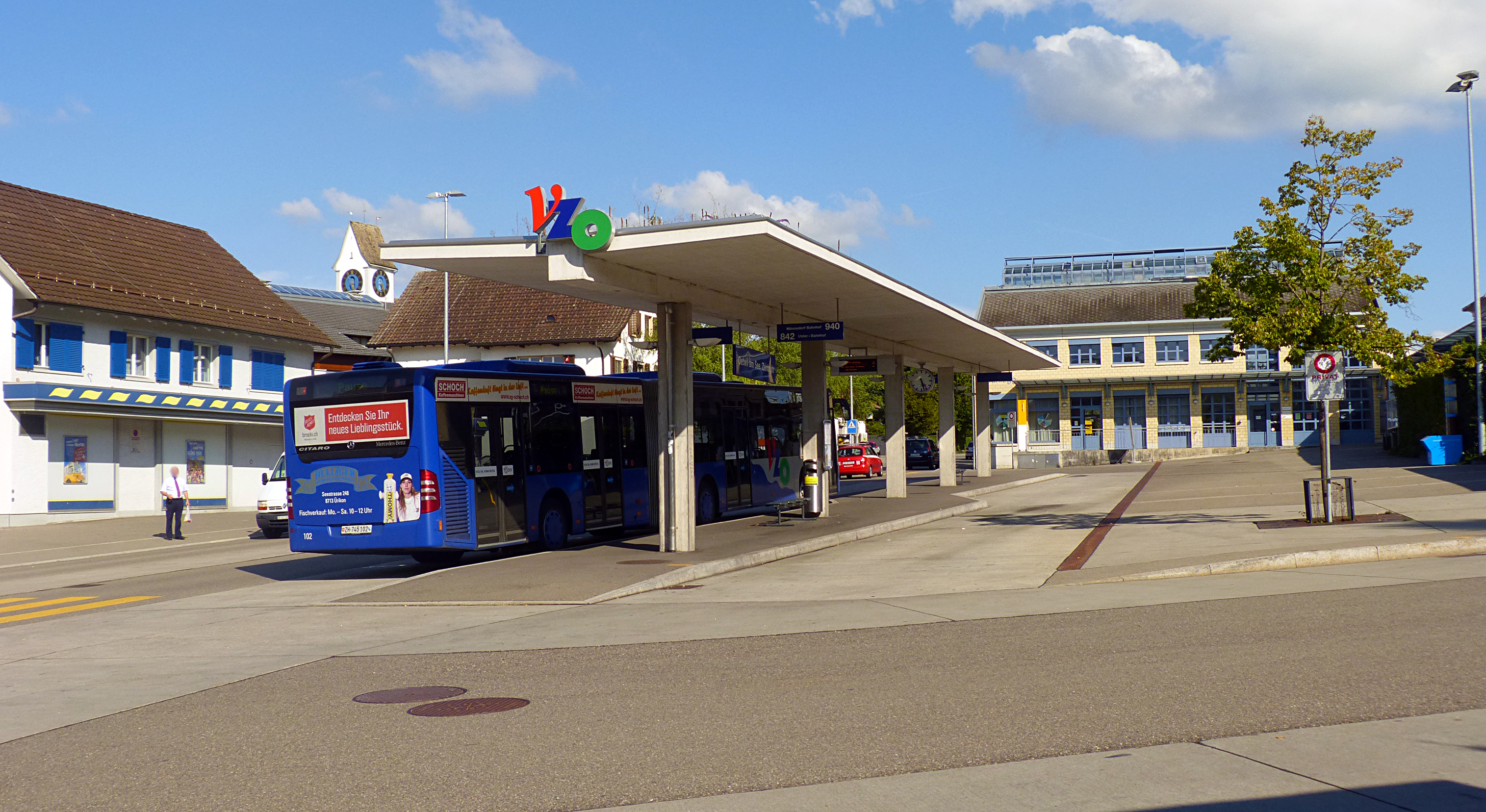
The central bus stop in Oetwil am See

Oetwil am See is first mentioned in 847 as Uttinwilare.

Between 1909 and 1949, Oetwil am See was connected to Uster by the Uster–Oetwil tramway and, between 1903 and 1950, to Wetzikon and Meilen by the Wetzikon–Meilen tramway. The two lines met at Langholz, in the south of the municipality.

== Geography ==
Oetwil am See has an area of 6.1 km^{2} (2.4 sq mi). Of this area, 67.8% is used for agricultural purposes, while 12.3% is forested. Of the rest of the land, 19.7% is settled (buildings or roads) and the remainder (0.2%) is non-productive (rivers, glaciers or mountains). In 1996 housing and buildings made up 14.1% of the total area, while transportation infrastructure made up the rest (5.6%). Of the total unproductive area, water (streams and lakes) made up 0% of the area. As of 2007 16.7% of the total municipal area was undergoing some type of construction.

Oetwil am See consists of the villages Oetwil am See, Willikon, Etzikon, Summerau and Chrüzlen.

== Demographics ==
Oetwil am See has a population (as of 31 December 2020) of 4,857. As of 2007, 25.8% of the population was made up of foreign nationals. As of 2008 the gender distribution of the population was 49.6% male and 50.4% female. Over the last 10 years the population has grown at a rate of 11.1%. Most of the population (as of 2000) speaks German (82.3%), with Italian being second most common ( 3.8%) and Serbo-Croatian being third ( 3.0%).

In the 2007 election the most popular party was the SVP which received 44% of the vote. The next three most popular parties were the SPS (17.2%), the FDP (9%) and the Green Party (8.8%).

The age distribution of the population (as of 2000) is children and teenagers (0–19 years old) make up 25.8% of the population, while adults (20–64 years old) make up 65.1% and seniors (over 64 years old) make up 9.2%. In Oetwil am See about 71.6% of the population (between age 25-64) have completed either non-mandatory upper secondary education or additional higher education (either university or a Fachhochschule). There are 1784 households in Oetwil am See.

Oetwil am See has an unemployment rate of 2.86%. As of 2005, there were 78 people employed in the primary economic sector and about 28 businesses involved in this sector. 860 people are employed in the secondary sector and there are 57 businesses in this sector. 1137 people are employed in the tertiary sector, with 126 businesses in this sector. As of 2007 66.7% of the working population were employed full-time, and 33.3% were employed part-time.

As of 2008 there were 722 Catholics and 896 Protestants in Oetwil am See. In the 2000 census, religion was broken down into several smaller categories. From the census, 45.7% were some type of Protestant, with 43.8% belonging to the Swiss Reformed Church and 1.8% belonging to other Protestant churches. 32.8% of the population were Catholic. Of the rest of the population, 0% were Muslim, 3.3% belonged to another religion (not listed), 2.5% did not give a religion, and 15.3% were atheist or agnostic.

The historical population is given in the following table:

year	population
1467	9 households
1670	250
1772	725
1850	1,158
1900	942
1950	1,222
