= Flying Turtle Award =

Iranian award for children's and young adult literature

Flying Turtle Award (Lakposht-e parandeh) is an Iranian award for children's and young adult literature awarded by the Iranian Illustrators Society and subsidized by the Iranian government.

The award in the form of Gold and Silver Flying Turtle Awards is presented for works of fictions published for the first time in Persian language (as such, translations are eligible) in categories for books for young children (ages 7–10), middle-grade books (ages 8–12) and young adult literature (YA) (ages 12 and up).

Tehran Times has described the award as "prestigious".

In 2024, during the 13th Award Ceremony, no book received the Golden Turtle Award, while three received the Silver Turtle Award. Two special awards were also awarded to individuals active in promoting youth literacy.
