= Coppenrath Verlag =

German publisher

Coppenrath Verlag GmbH & Co KG
- Industry: Publishing
- Founded: 1768 in Münster, Germany
- Founder: Joseph Heinrich Coppenrath
- Headquarters: Münster, Germany
- Key people: Wolfgang Hölker, Lambert Scheer
- Website: www.coppenrath.de

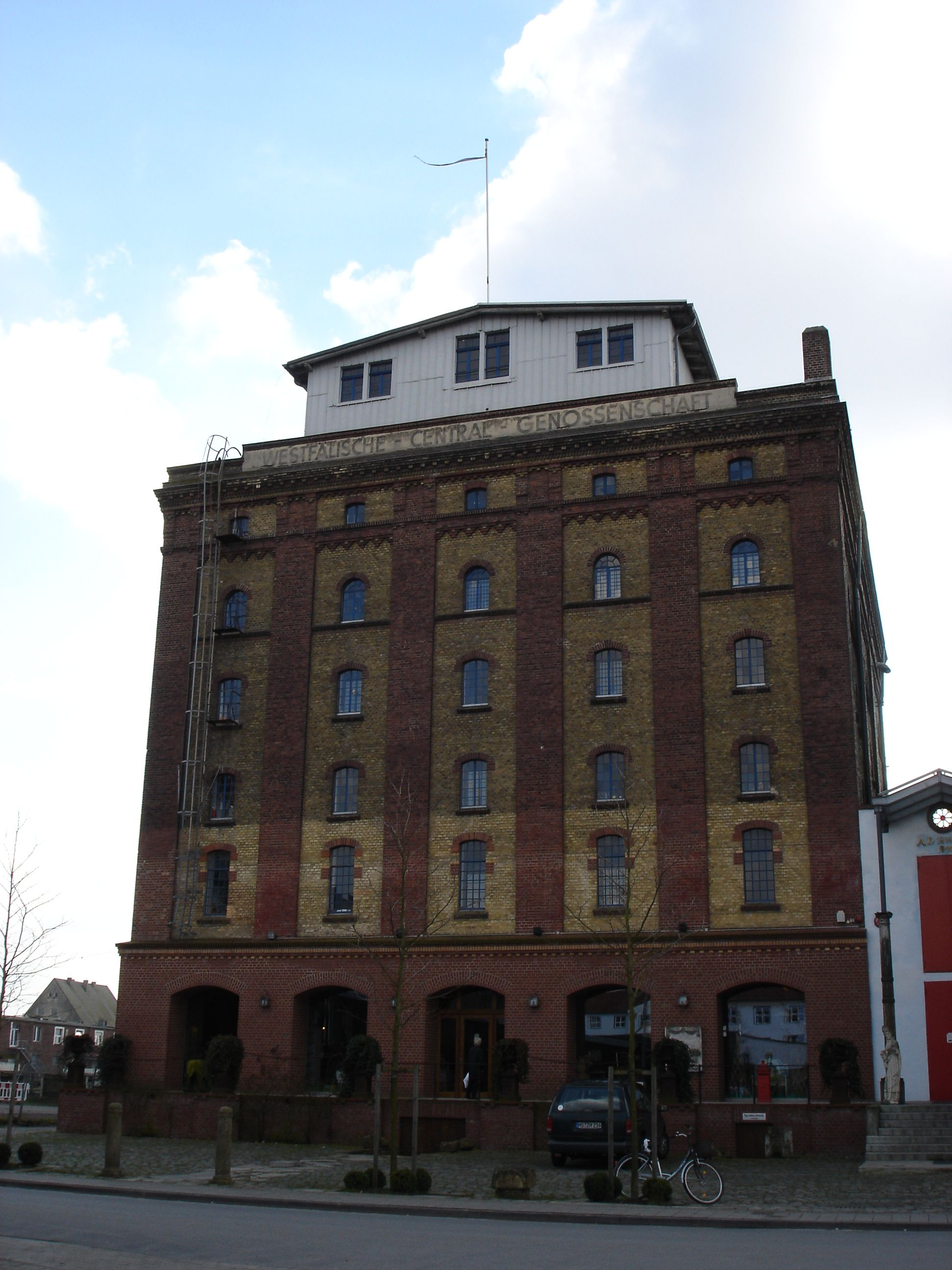
The publisher's headquarters at the Kreativkai ("Creative-quay"), Münster, in a former grain warehouse, built 1899

Coppenrath Verlag GmbH & Co KG is a German publishing house based in Münster, in the North Rhine-Westphalia region of Germany. It publishes primarily children's and young people's literature, together with various non-book and marketing products. Coppenrath is known for the children's book series Felix (children's books) by Annette Langen, and Princess Lillifee by Monika Finsterbusch. The publisher has also worked with Rolf Zuckowski in 2001. Coppenrath is known for its production of Advent calendars.

== History ==
The publishing house was founded in Münster in 1768 when Joseph Heinrich Coppenrath took over the Perrenonschen Hofbuchhandlung. The business remained in the hands of Coppenrath family until 1977, when it was taken over by Wolfgang Hölker.

In 2018, the publisher moved its nearly 180 staff to a new nine-million-Euro building, Speicher 3, a former warehouse at the Kreativkai in the port of Münster.

== Divisions ==
The Coppenrath publishing group publishes in four divisions. Firstly there is the Coppenrath Verlag itself, which is best known for its children's books, including the Lino-Bücher, a series of small books to be read by, or to, children. This series began in 2001 with fairy-tales; the first was the Italian story of Pinocchio. As of 2022, more than sixty have been published. The books are square, with a 12 × 12 cm format.

In 1992, Coppenrath began to sell children's games under the brand Die Spiegelburg, "The Mirror-Castle". A number of games have been nominated for the children's section of the German "Spiel des Jahres" award, or appeared in its list of recommended games:

- Mit Felix um die Welt ("With Felix around the world") by Kai Haferkamp was in the recommended list for 2006.
- Capt’n Sharky – Abenteuer auf der Schatzinsel (Captain Sharky - the Adventure of the Treasure Island) by Kai Haferkamp was nominated in 2008.
- Die Lieben Sieben – Ab auf die Wippe! (The lovely seven - Off on the seesaw!) by Anja Dreier-Brückner was on the recommended list in 2010.

The Hölker Verlag forms a third division, founded in 1972, and publishing regional cookery books, as well as modern books about food.

The remaining division, the Bohem Verlag, was founded in 1973 and publishes poetic picture-books.
