= Mönchaltorf =

- Municipality
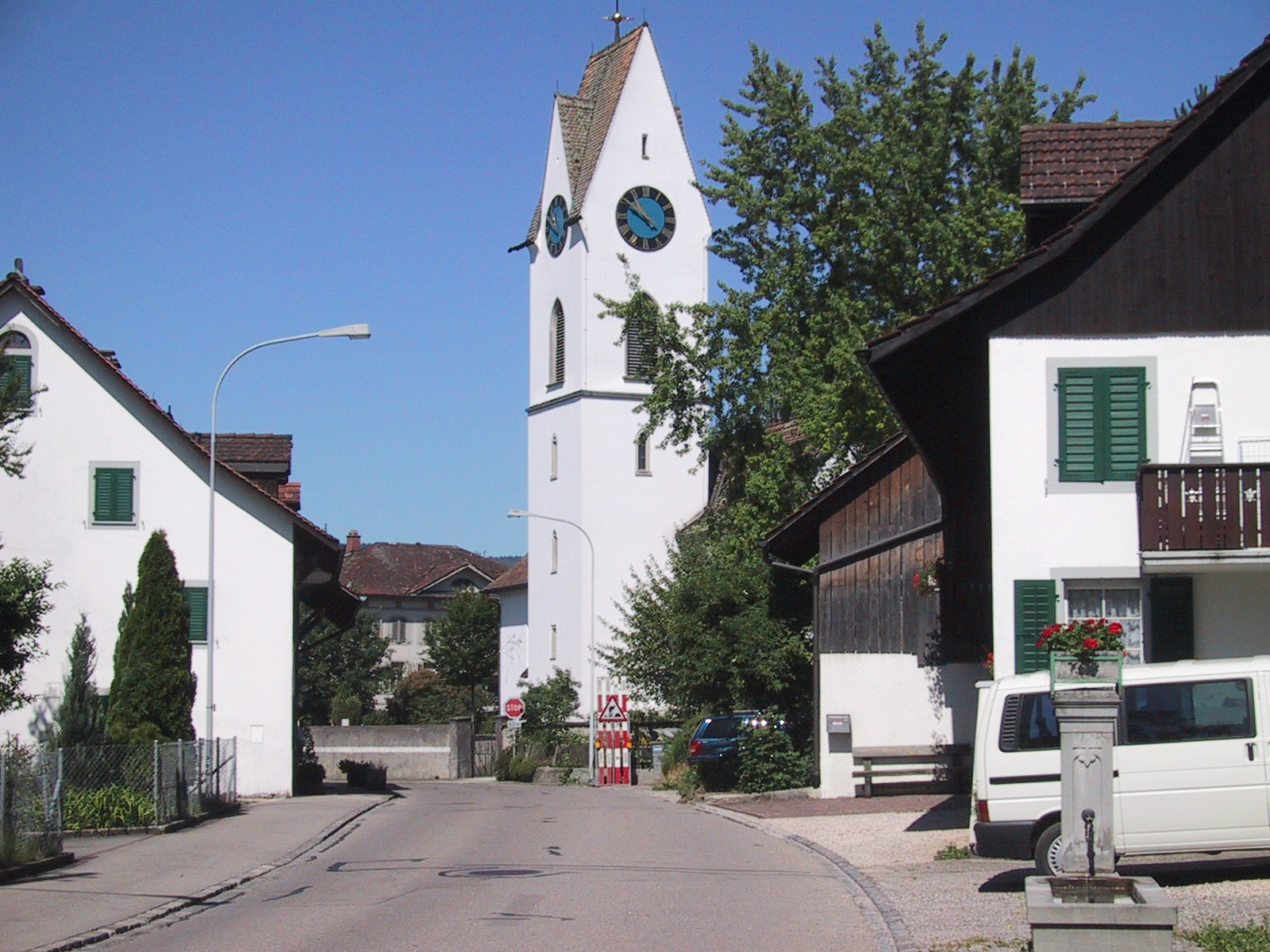

- Flag Coat of arms
- Location of Mönchaltorf
- Location within Switzerland Location within Canton of Zurich
- Coordinates: 47°19′N 8°43′E
- Country: Switzerland
- Canton: Zurich
- District: Uster

Government
  - Mayor: Annemarie Beglinger

Area
  - Total: 7.62 km^{2} (2.94 sq mi)
- Elevation: 442 m (1,450 ft)

Population (December 2020)
  - Total: 4,082
  - Density: 536/km^{2} (1,390/sq mi)
- Time zone: UTC+01:00 (CET)
  - Summer (DST): UTC+02:00 (CEST)
- Postal code: 8617
- SFOS number: 196
- ISO 3166 code: CH-ZH
- Surrounded by: Egg, Gossau, Maur, Seegräben, Uster, Wetzikon
- Website: www.moenchaltorf.ch

Mönchaltorf is a municipality in the district of Uster in the canton of Zürich in Switzerland.

== History ==
Mönchaltorf is first mentioned in 741 as Villa Altorf. In 872 it was mentioned as Altorf monachorum.

== Geography ==
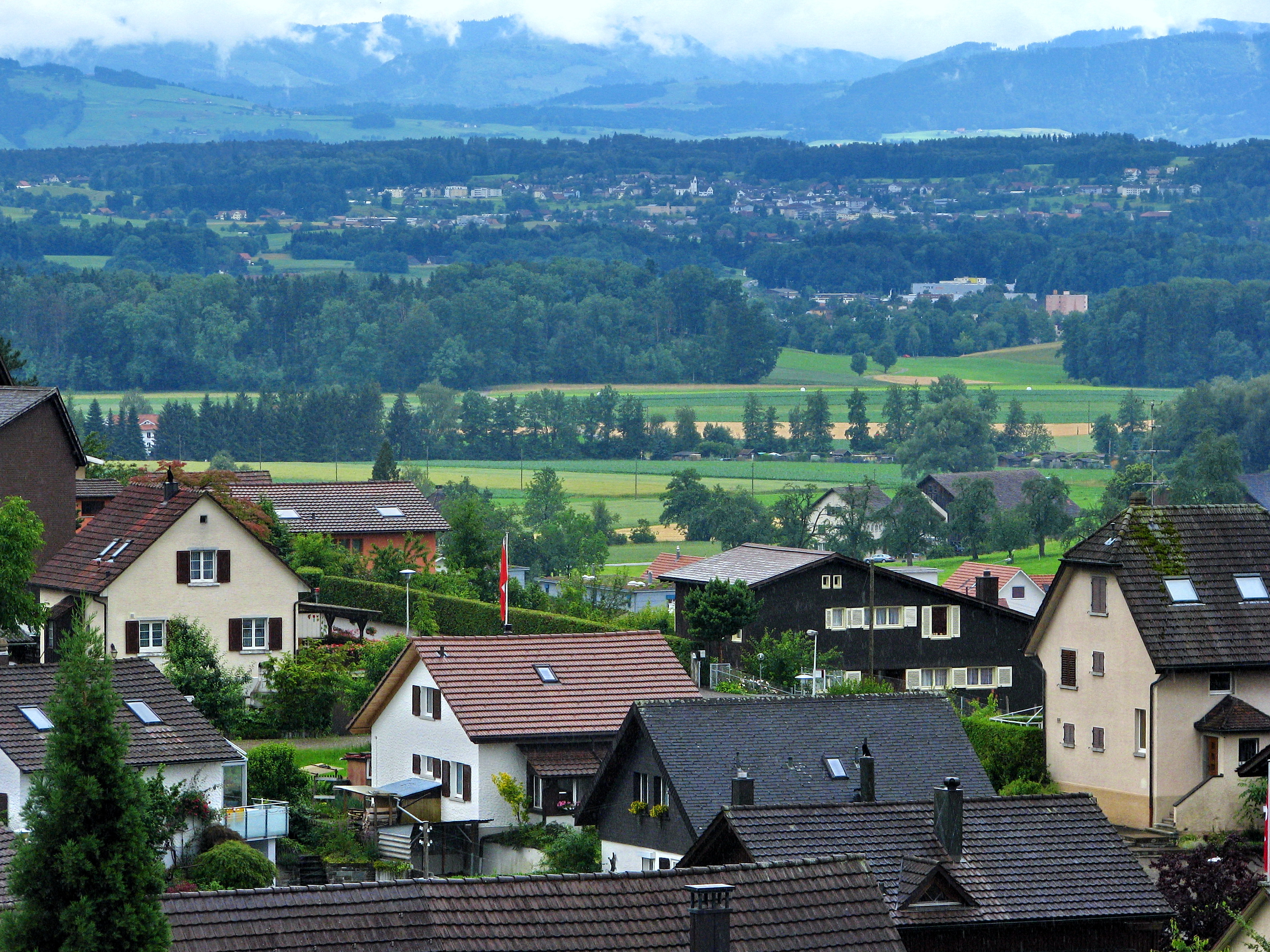
Mönchaltorf as seen from Uster castle

Aerial view (1947)

Mönchaltorf has an area of 7.6 km^{2} (2.9 sq mi). Of this area, 70.1% is used for agricultural purposes, while 11.2% is forested. Of the rest of the land, 15.7% is settled (buildings or roads) and the remainder (3%) is non-productive (rivers, glaciers or mountains). In 1996 housing and buildings made up 12.1% of the total area, while transportation infrastructure made up the rest (3.7%). Of the total unproductive area, water (streams and lakes) made up 0.3% of the area. As of 2007 12.8% of the total municipal area was undergoing some type of construction.

== Demographics ==
Mönchaltorf has a population (as of 31 December 2020) of 4,082. As of 2007, 11.6% of the population was made up of foreign nationals. As of 2008 the gender distribution of the population was 48.8% male and 51.2% female. Over the last 10 years the population has grown at a rate of 3.7%. Most of the population (as of 2000) speaks German (92.3%), with Italian being second most common ( 1.7%) and French being third ( 1.0%).

In the 2007 election the most popular party was the SVP which received 39.2% of the vote. The next three most popular parties were the SPS (20.9%), the CSP (11.9%) and the FDP (11.7%).

The age distribution of the population (as of 2000) is children and teenagers (0–19 years old) make up 23.6% of the population, while adults (20–64 years old) make up 66.7% and seniors (over 64 years old) make up 9.8%. In Mönchaltorf about 83.9% of the population (between age 25-64) have completed either non-mandatory upper secondary education or additional higher education (either university or a Fachhochschule). There are 1336 households in Mönchaltorf.

Mönchaltorf has an unemployment rate of 1.87%. As of 2005, there were 110 people employed in the primary economic sector and about 36 businesses involved in this sector. 367 people are employed in the secondary sector and there are 37 businesses in this sector. 602 people are employed in the tertiary sector, with 119 businesses in this sector. As of 2007 50% of the working population were employed full-time, and 50% were employed part-time.

As of 2008 there were 733 Catholics and 1582 Protestants in Mönchaltorf. In the 2000 census, religion was broken down into several smaller categories. From the census, 56.1% were some type of Protestant, with 50.7% belonging to the Swiss Reformed Church and 5.5% belonging to other Protestant churches. 23.9% of the population were Catholic. Of the rest of the population, 0% were Muslim, 3.2% belonged to another religion (not listed), 2.7% did not give a religion, and 13.4% were atheist or agnostic.

== Population growth ==
The following table shows the population development of Mönchaltorf.

Population Development
Year	Inhabitants:
1771	695
1850	1148
1860	1189
1900	804
1941	706
1950	837
1960	1023
1970	1604
1980	2863
1990	3494
2000	3183

== Politics ==
Mayor is Annemarie Beglinger-Vögeli (FDP). Former mayors were Gustav Stehli (SVP), Felix Hess (SVP) and until 2006 Ruedi Lerch (FDP).

Member of the municipal council (2014–2018)
Name	Beginning	Task	Party
Beglinger-Vögeli Annemarie	2002	Mayor / presidential / plan / development	FDP
Schlumpf Marlis	2016	society	SP
Fürst Rudolf	2004	security	SVP
Galliker Hans-Rudolf	2010	education	FDP
Graf Urs	2014	underground work	independent
Kaderli Bernhard	2014	finance / economy	FDP
Larry-Hug Andrea	2014	high building / property / culture	SP

== Gallery ==
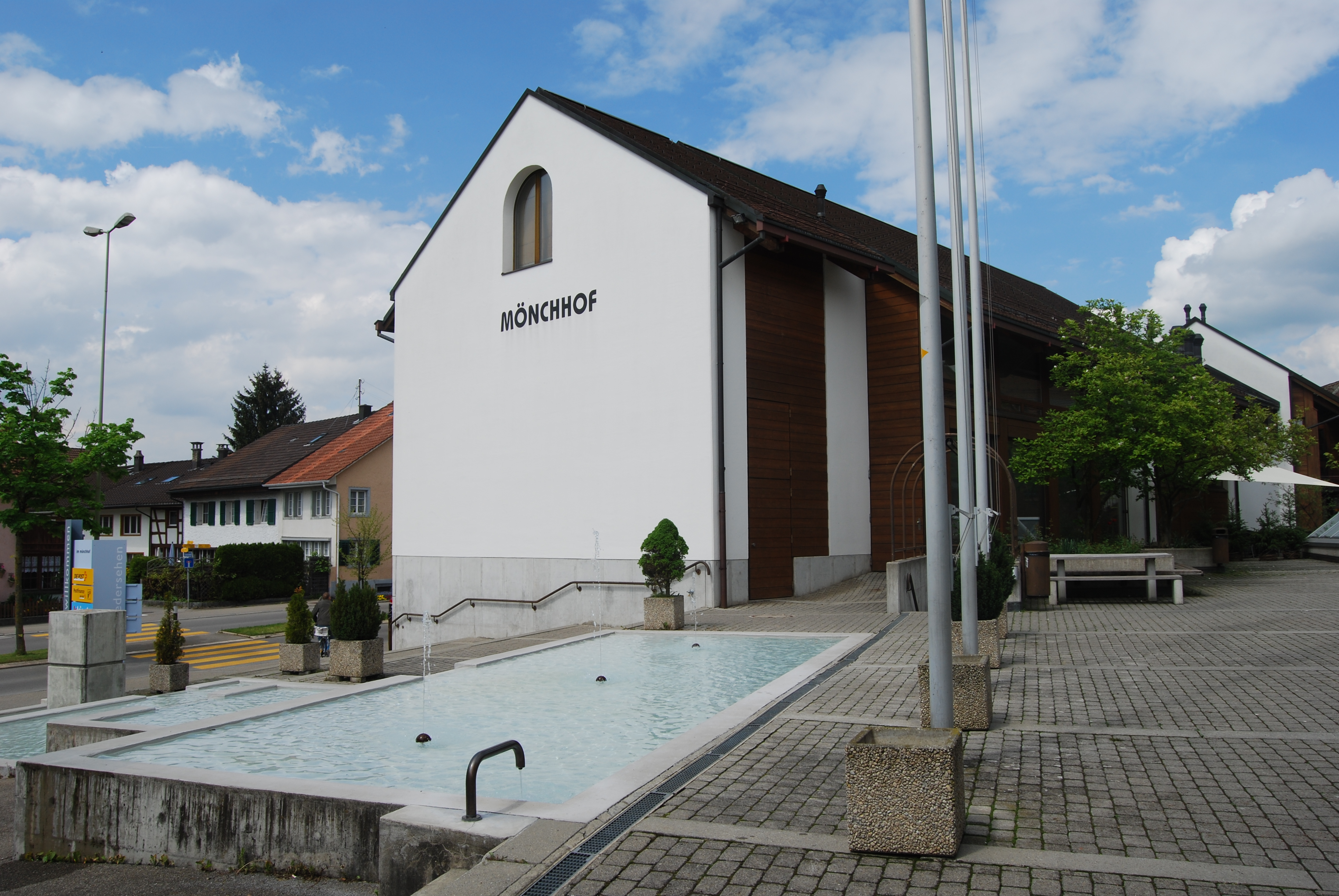
fontain in front of the Mönchhof (meeting point)

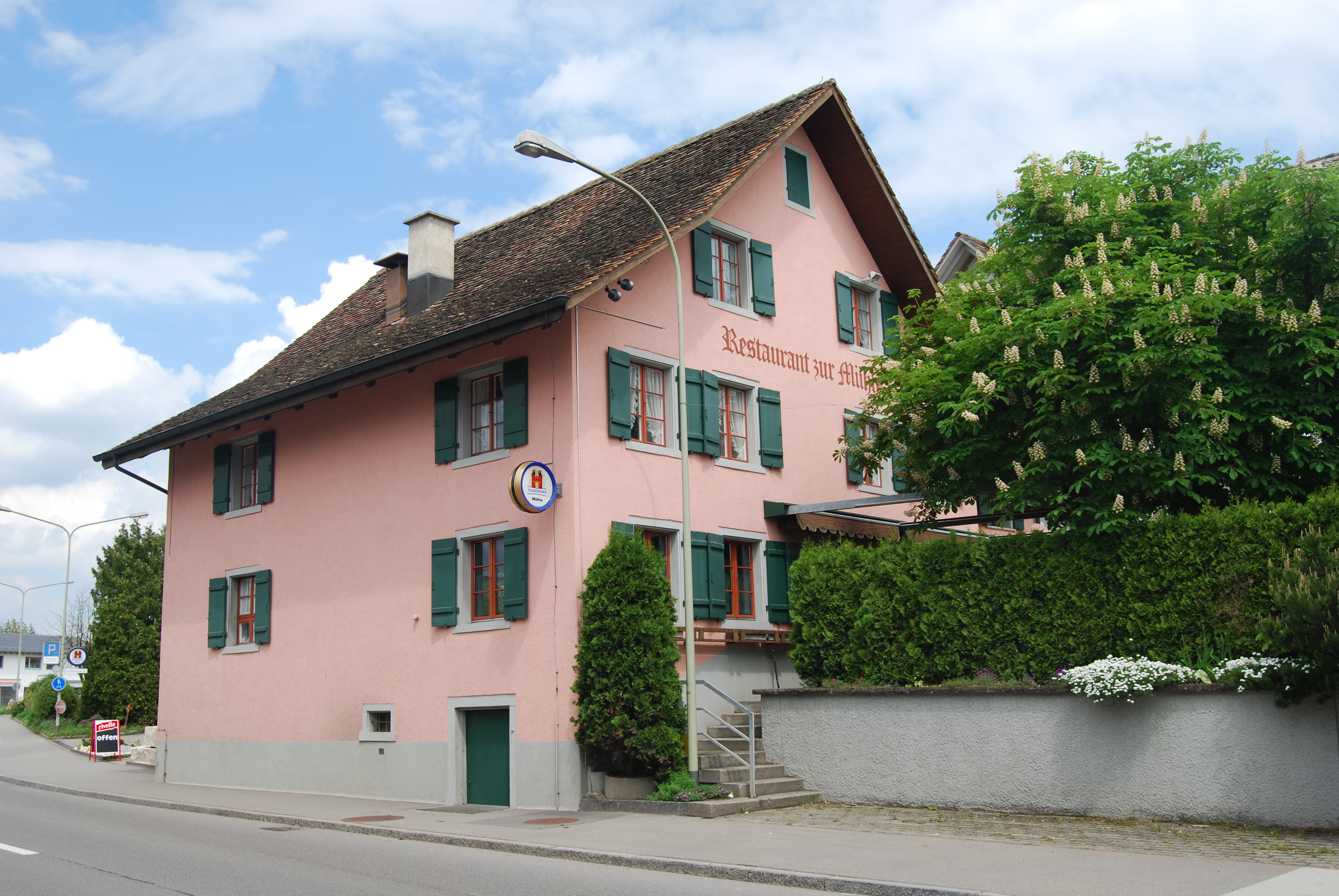
Restaurant Mühle(Mill)

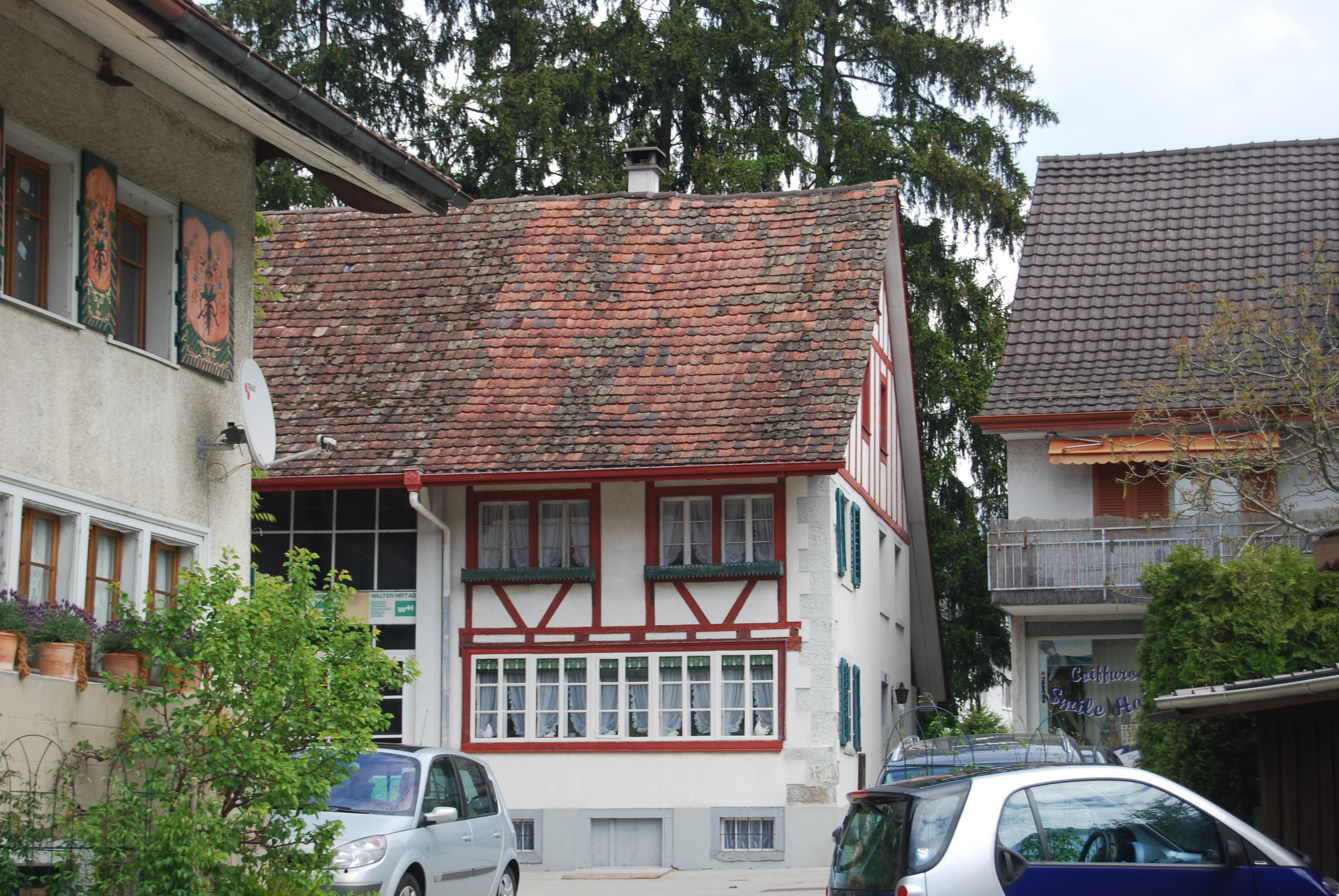
vintage house in the middle of Mönchaltorf

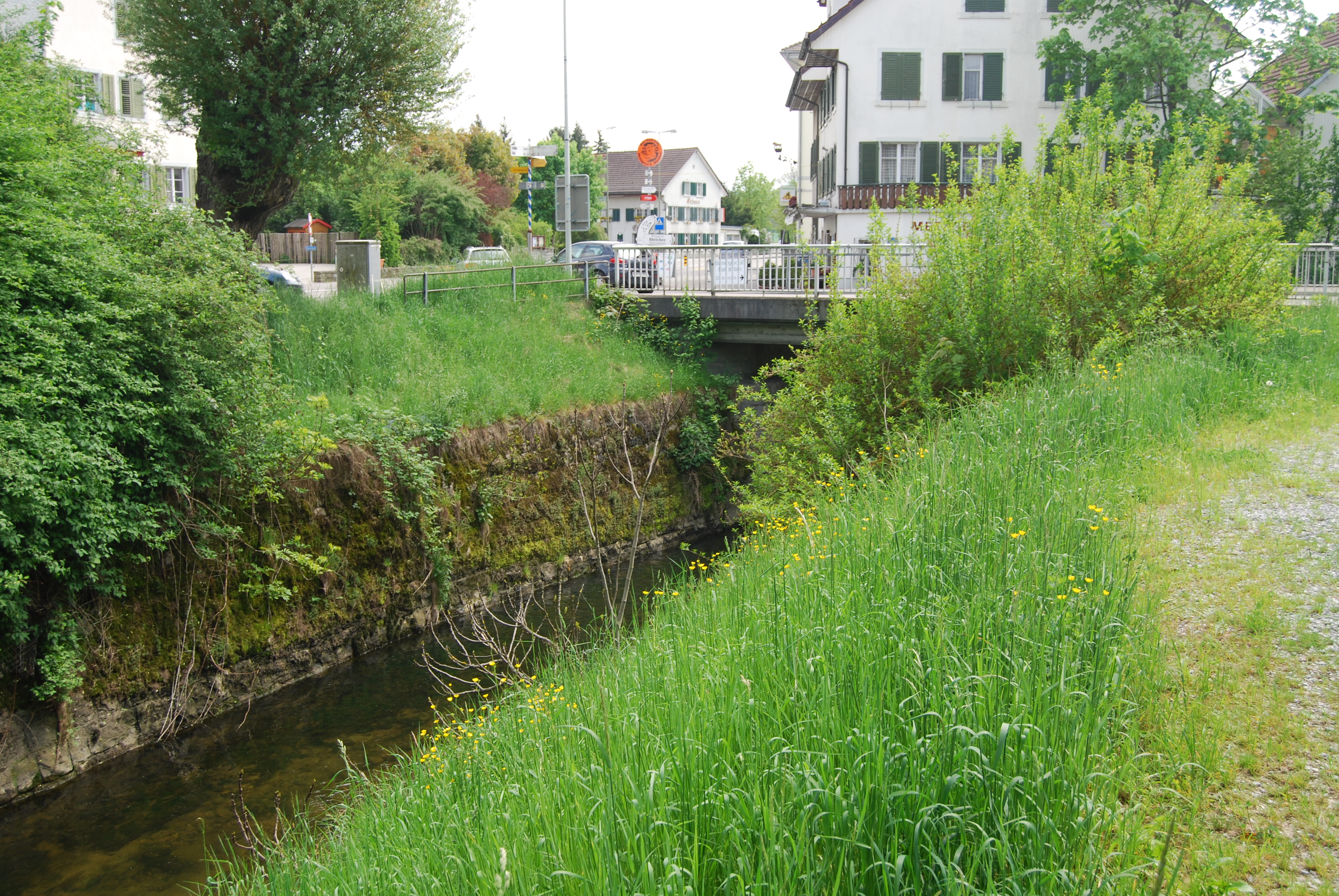
runnel which flows to Greifensee
