= Gossau, Zürich =

Gossau
- Municipality
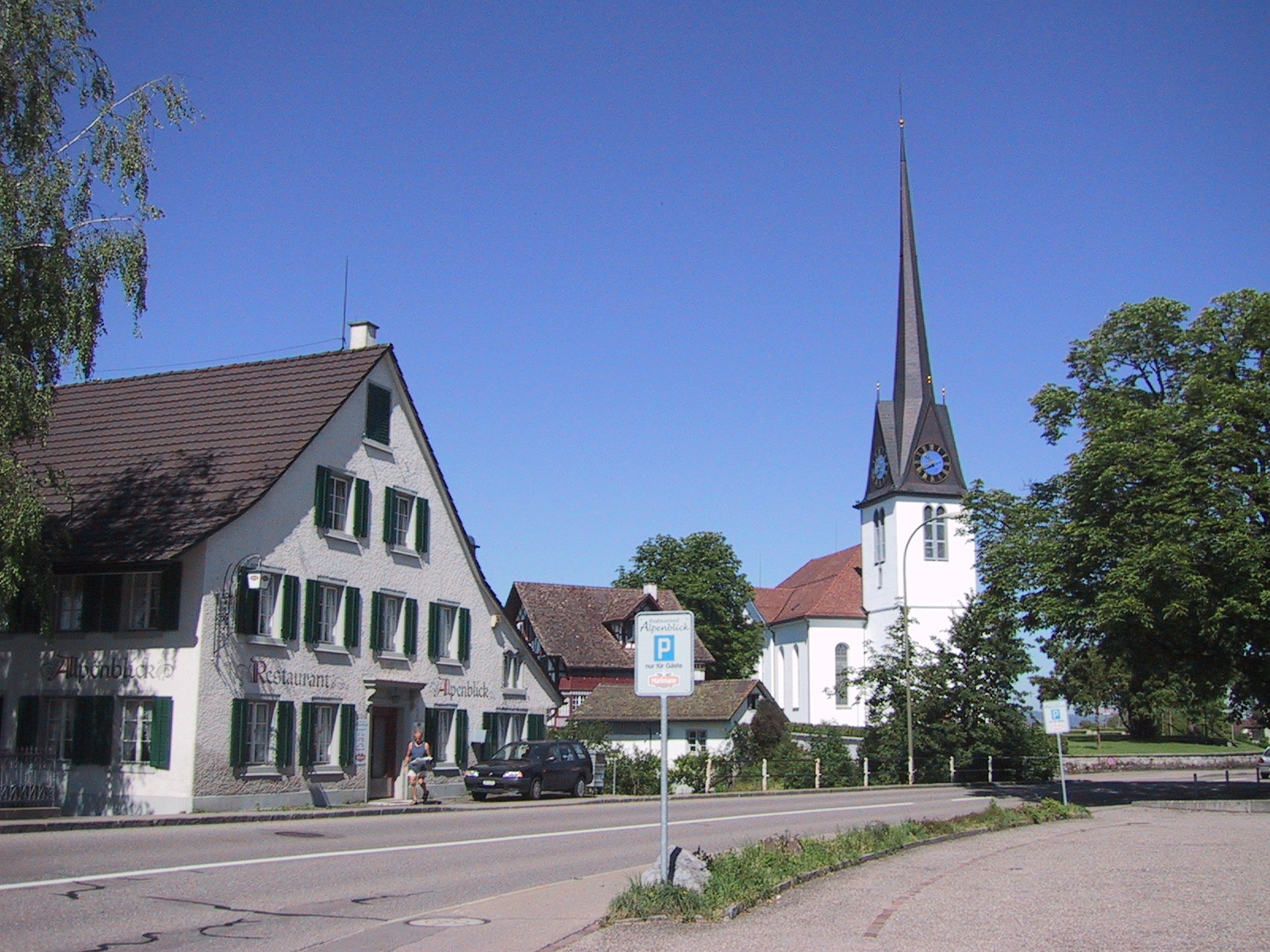

- Flag Coat of arms
- Location of Gossau
- Location within Switzerland Location within Canton of Zurich
- Coordinates: 47°19′N 8°45′E
- Country: Switzerland
- Canton: Zurich
- District: Hinwil

Area
  - Total: 18.28 km^{2} (7.06 sq mi)
- Elevation: 455 m (1,493 ft)

Population (December 2020)
  - Total: 10,282
  - Density: 562.5/km^{2} (1,457/sq mi)
- Time zone: UTC+01:00 (CET)
  - Summer (DST): UTC+02:00 (CEST)
- Postal code: 8625
- SFOS number: 115
- ISO 3166 code: CH-ZH
- Surrounded by: Bubikon, Egg, Grüningen, Hinwil, Mönchaltorf, Uster, Wetzikon
- Website: www.gossau-zh.ch

Gossau is a municipality in the district of Hinwil in the canton of Zürich in Switzerland. Besides the village of Gossau itself, the municipality includes the settlements of Bertschikon, Grüt, Herschmettlen and Ottikon.

== History ==
Gossau is first mentioned in 859 as Cozzesouwo.

== Notable persons ==
- Jakob Falk (*15th or 16th century; † 5. September 1528 in Zurich), martyr of the Swiss Anabaptist movement
- Ernst Brugger (*10. März 1914; † 20. Juni 1998), politician

== Geography ==
Aerial view from 400 m by Walter Mittelholzer (1925)

Gossau has an area of 18.3 km^{2} (7.1 sq mi). Of this area, 67% is used for agricultural purposes, while 14.2% is forested. Of the rest of the land, 17.9% is settled (buildings or roads) and the remainder (0.8%) is non-productive (streams and non-productive vegetation). In 1996 housing and buildings made up 12% of the total area, while transportation infrastructure made up the rest (5.9%). Of the total unproductive area, water (i.e. streams) made up 0.4% of the area. As of 2007 11.7% of the total municipal area was undergoing some type of construction.

The municipality is made up of five sections; Gossau (with the church settlement of Berg), Bertschikon, Grüt, Herschmettlen and Ottikon. It stretches through the uppermost section of the Glatt valley. The topography is littered with ice age moraines (known as Drumlins) and basin of the former Gossauer Ried (Gossauer moor).

== Politics ==
Mayor is Jörg Kündig (FDP, 2014).

Member of the municipal council (2014–2018)
Name	Beginning	Task	Party
Jörg Kündig	1994	Mayor	FDP
Daniel Baldenweg	1998	high-building and planning	EVP
Salvatore Giorgiano	2014	security	independent
Marc Huber	2002	underground work	independent
Elisabeth Pflugshaupt	2014	property, business, culture and sport	SVP
Sylvia Veraguth Bamert	2010	society	PFP (Political podium of women Gossau)
Heinrich Wintsch	1990	environment	SVP

== Demographics ==
Gossau has a population (as of 31 December 2020) of 10,282. As of 2007, 10.5% of the population was made up of foreign nationals. As of 2008 the gender distribution of the population was 49.9% male and 50.1% female. Over the last 10 years the population has grown at a rate of 12.4%. Most of the population (as of 2000) speaks German (92.4%), with Italian being second most common ( 2.0%) and Portuguese being third ( 1.2%).

In the 2007 election the most popular party was the SVP which received 40.3% of the vote. The next three most popular parties were the CSP (14.8%), the SPS (14.4%) and the FDP (10.3%).

The age distribution of the population (as of 2000) is children and teenagers (0–19 years old) make up 26.5% of the population, while adults (20–64 years old) make up 62.5% and seniors (over 64 years old) make up 11%. The entire Swiss population is generally well educated. In Gossau about 82% of the population (between age 25-64) have completed either non-mandatory upper secondary education or additional higher education (either university or a Fachhochschule). There are 3442 households in Gossau.

Gossau has an unemployment rate of 1.38%. As of 2005, there were 327 people employed in the primary economic sector and about 72 businesses involved in this sector. 922 people are employed in the secondary sector and there are 99 businesses in this sector. 1045 people are employed in the tertiary sector, with 243 businesses in this sector. As of 2007 50% of the working population were employed full-time, and 50% were employed part-time.

As of 2008 there were 2458 Catholics and 4523 Protestants in Gossau. In the 2000 census, religion was broken down into several smaller categories. From the 2000 census, 56.4% were some type of Protestant, with 51.4% belonging to the Swiss Reformed Church and 4.9% belonging to other Protestant churches. 25.5% of the population were Catholic. Of the rest of the population, 0% were Muslim, 2.9% belonged to another religion (not listed), 3.2% did not give a religion, and 11.8% were atheist or agnostic.

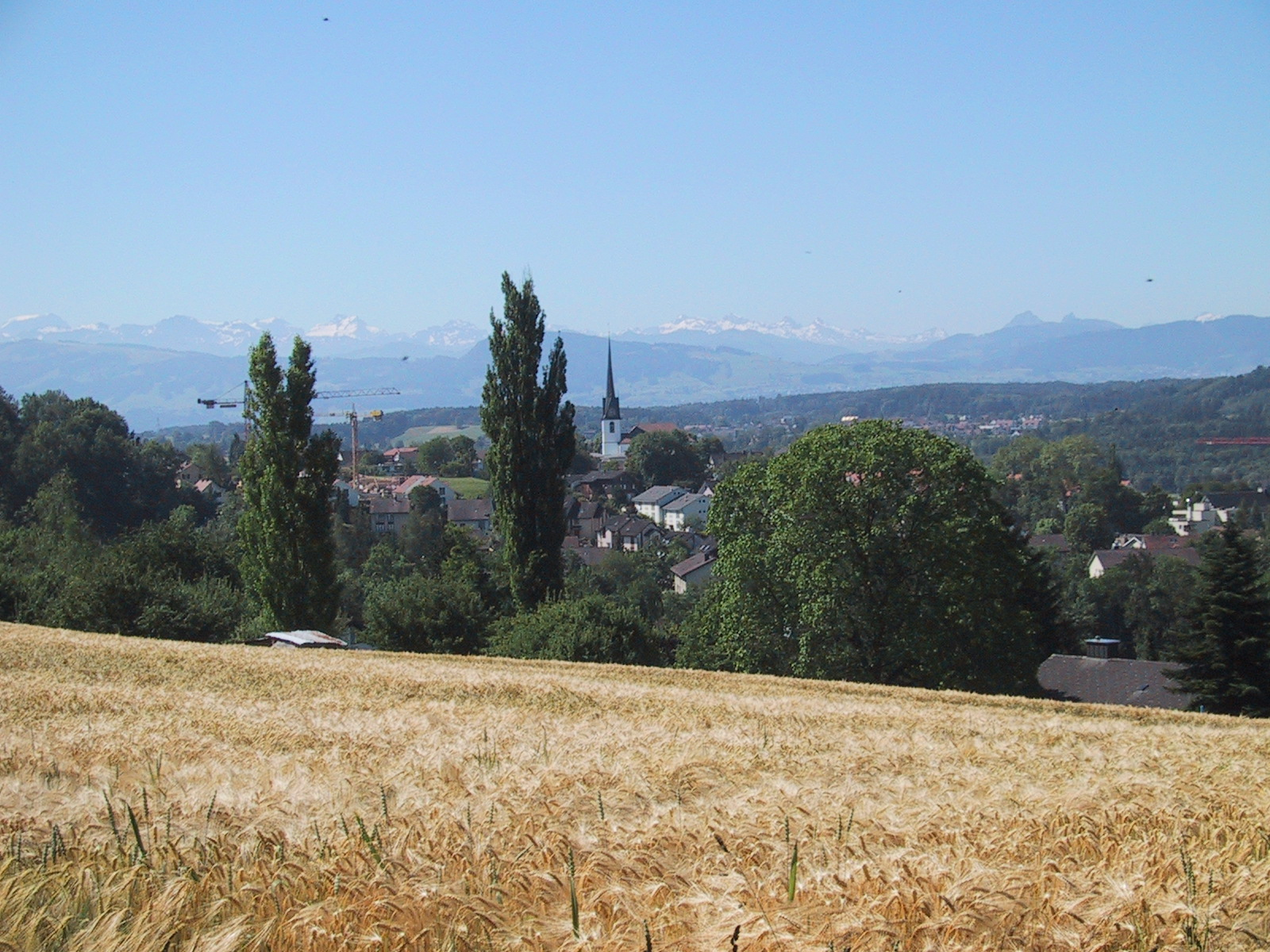
Gossau ZH (2005)

The historical population is given in the following table:

year	population
1634	875
1730	1,649
1850	3,089
1910	2,322
1941	2,387
1970	4,759
1990	7,157
2000	8,685
