= Etzel =

Etzel may refer to:

== People ==
Given name

- Etzel Cardeña (born 1957), Swedish psychologist and researcher
- Etzel, Attila the Hun in Germanic heroic legend.

Surname

- Edward Etzel (born 1952), American sport shooter
- Franz Etzel (1902–1970), German politician
- Gunther von Etzel (1862–1948), German general
- Karl Etzel (1812–1865), German railway engineer and architect
- Martin Etzel (1867–1914), German trade union leader
- Matthew Etzel (born 2002), American baseball player
- Otto von Etzel (1860–1934), German soldier and diplomat

== Places ==
- Etzel (mountain), in the Swiss Alps
- Etzel Pass, in Switzerland
- Etzel, Friedeburg, a village in Friedeburg, Lower Saxony, Germany

== Other uses ==
- Etzel (Irgun Tzvai-Leumi), a Zionist group that operated in the British Mandate of Palestine from 1931 to 1948
- Etzel (ship), a preserved 1934 motor ship on Lake Zurich in Switzerland
