= Feldmeilen =

- Former municipality
- Location of Feldmeilen
- Location within Switzerland Location within Canton of Zürich
- Coordinates: 47°16.67′N 8°37′E
- Country: Switzerland
- Canton: Zürich
- District: Meilen
- Municipality: Meilen
- Elevation: 412 m (1,352 ft)
- Time zone: UTC+01:00 (CET)
  - Summer (DST): UTC+02:00 (CEST)
- Postal code: 8706
- ISO 3166 code: CH-ZH
- Surrounded by: Herrliberg, Meilen
- Website: www.meilen.ch

Feldmeilen is a village (Wacht) within the municipality of Meilen in the Canton of Zürich in Switzerland.

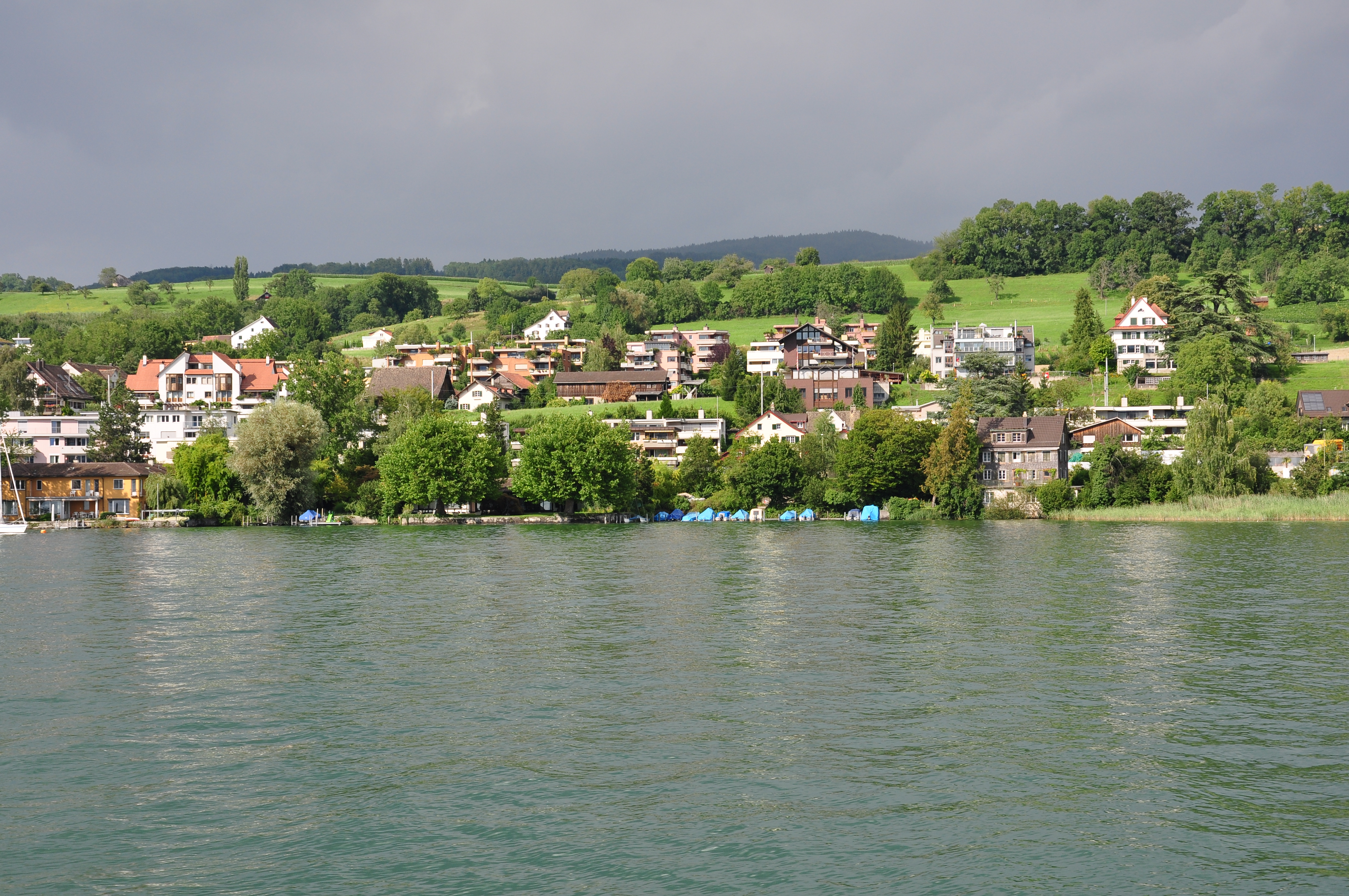
Feldmeilen as seen from a Zürichsee-Schifffahrtsgesellschaft (ZSG) motorship

== Geography ==
Feldmeilen is located in the district of Meilen in the Pfannenstiel region on the northwestern shore of the Zürichsee (Lake Zürich) between Zürich-Seefeld and Rapperswil. It is around 10 km from Zürich.

== Demographics, education and economics ==
Feldmeilen belongs politically to the municipality of Meilen and is its largest village. Schools on Primarschule level are situated in the village; higher school levels are located in Meilen. Parts of the Swarovski International Holding are situated in the village as well as the Raggi-Verlag, a publishing house.

== Transportation ==
Herrliberg-Feldmeilen railway station is shared with the neighbouring municipality of Herrliberg. Herrliberg-Feldmeilen is a stop of the S-Bahn Zürich on the line S6, and it is a terminal station of the S-Bahn Zürich on the line S16.

In the summer there are regular boats to Zürich as well as along the lake to Rapperswil, run by the Zürichsee-Schifffahrtsgesellschaft (ZSG).

== Points of interest ==
Two mansions are situated in Feldmeilen: «Grüene Hof» built in 1682/84, and «Mariafeld» built in 1722/25, among those guests were Gottfried Keller, Franz Liszt, Conrad Ferdinand Meyer and Richard Wagner.

== History ==
Aerial view from 300 m by Walter Mittelholzer (1927)

In Feldmeilen-Vorderfeld a Bronze Age stilt house settlement was located. In Feldmeilen-Bünishofen a small castle of the St. Gallen Abbey is mentioned.

== Heritage site of national significance ==
Located on Zürichsee lakeshore, Meilen–Rorenhaab is part of the 56 Swiss sites of the UNESCO World Heritage Site Prehistoric pile dwellings around the Alps, and the settlement is also listed in the Swiss inventory of cultural property of national and regional significance as a Class A object of national importance.

== Notable people ==
- Werner Hug (born 1952 in Feldmeilen)
- Jessica Kilian (born 1981)
- Tanja Morel (born 1975)
