= Meilen =

- Municipality
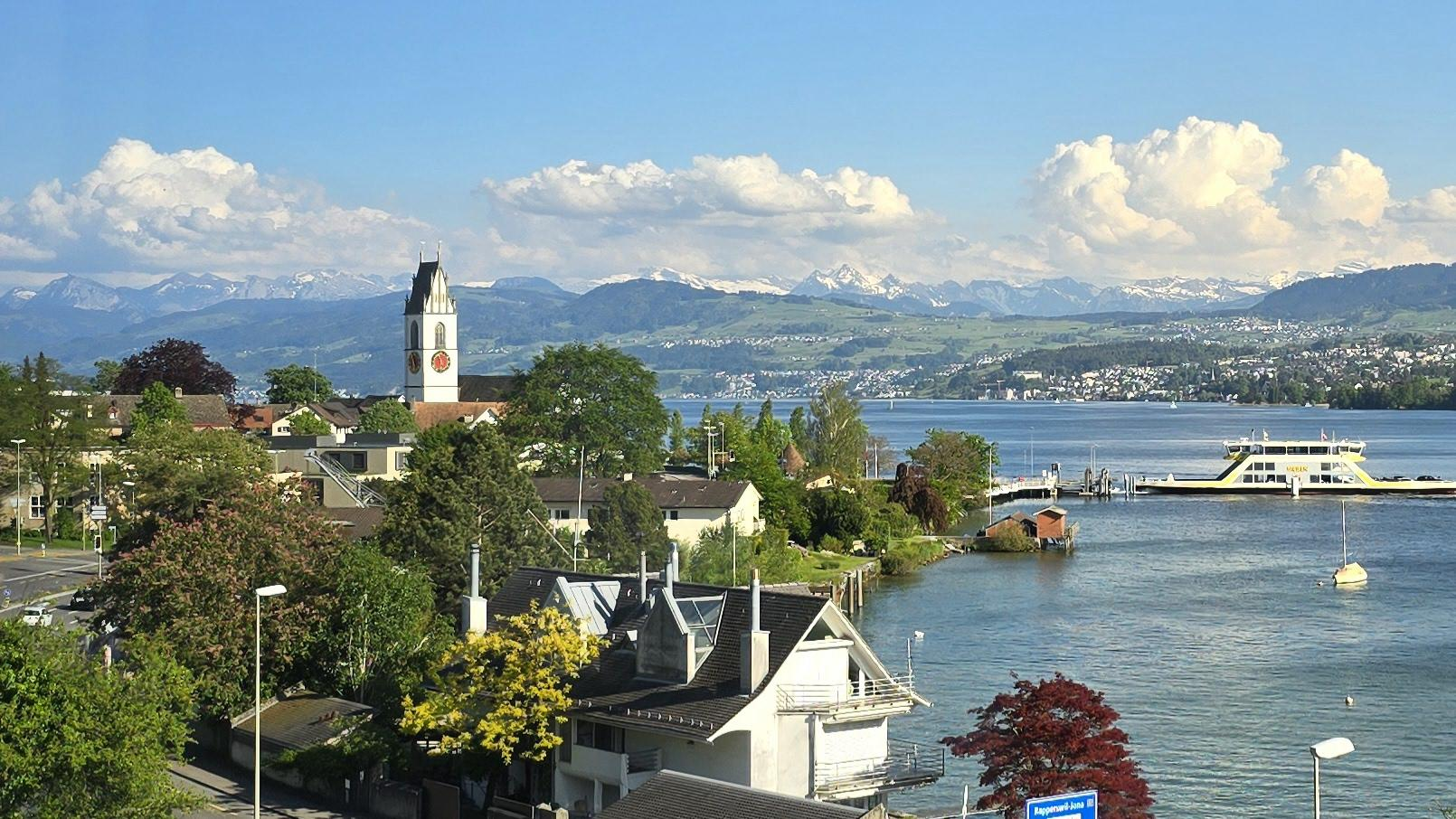

- Flag Coat of arms
- Location of Meilen
- Location within Switzerland Location within Canton of Zürich
- Coordinates: 47°16′N 8°38′E
- Country: Switzerland
- Canton: Zürich
- District: Meilen

Area
  - Total: 11.93 km^{2} (4.61 sq mi)
- Elevation: 420 m (1,380 ft)

Population (December 2020)
  - Total: 14,539
  - Density: 1,219/km^{2} (3,156/sq mi)
- Time zone: UTC+01:00 (CET)
  - Summer (DST): UTC+02:00 (CEST)
- Postal code: 8706
- SFOS number: 156
- ISO 3166 code: CH-ZH
- Localities: Bergmeilen, Dorfmeilen, Feldmeilen, Obermeilen
- Surrounded by: Egg, Herrliberg, Horgen, Oberrieden, Uetikon am See, Wädenswil
- Twin towns: Ebes (Hungary), Policka (Czech Republic)
- Website: www.meilen.ch

Meilen is a municipality in the district of Meilen in the canton of Zürich in Switzerland.

== History ==
Aerial view from 200 m by Walter Mittelholzer (1919)

Archaeological finds in Meilen date back more than 4,000 years. In January 1854 the level of lake Zürich was particularly low and the locals took the chance to reclaim some land. During this undertaking prehistoric objects from the Pfyn, Horgen and early Bronze Age cultures were unearthed providing clear evidence of early settlement.

The locals also unearthed coins from Roman times (1st to 3rd century AD). One of the Roman roads connected Turicum (Zürich) with places up to Chur and passed by Meilen. Many findings were discovered during more recent road construction.

Parts of Meilen were possessions of monasteries, including the monastery of St. Gallen, the ones of Einsiedeln and Säckingen, or the more local Grossmünster of Zürich. Meilen is first mentioned between 820 and 880 as Meilana.

The town's coat of arms shows two castle towers which represent the castle of Friedberg, the local castle. The castle was built around 1200 but was extended in the 14th century. Some remains are still visible, including the fountain which reaches down 29 metres. Wine making in Meilen dates back for centuries.

In 1384 Meilen became a bailiwick of Zürich. Thanks to the reeve Meilen enjoyed relative autonomy until 1798. Since the Middle Ages local trade and handicraft was established in Meilen. There were at least four mills to support the local agriculture. Towards the end of the 18th century, industrialisation arrived in Meilen in form of textiles, but this form of production disappeared in the 19th century. With the arrival of the railway in 1894 local trade and industry blossomed. The ferry to Horgen was opened in 1933.

== Geography ==
Meilen has an area of 11.9 square kilometers (4.6 sq mi). Of this area, 46.9% is used for agricultural purposes, 24.4% is forested, 27.2% is settled (buildings or roads) and the remainder (1.4%) is non-productive (rivers, glaciers or mountains). In 1996 housing and buildings made up 21.4% of the total area, while transportation infrastructure made up the rest (5.8%). Of the total unproductive area, water (streams and lakes) made up 0.2% of the area. As of 2007 26.5% of the total municipal area was undergoing some type of construction.

It is located on the north bank of the lake of Zürich. Meilen is located about halfway between Zürich and Rapperswil. Meilen is connected to Horgen across the lake by ferry. In the local dialect it is called Meile.

The town is divided into four districts (Wachten), namely Feldmeilen, Dorfmeilen and Obermeilen along the lake side, as well as Bergmeilen towards the Mt. Pfannenstiel. The districts used to be more autonomous, but today the division is only used for schooling purposes.

== Demographics ==
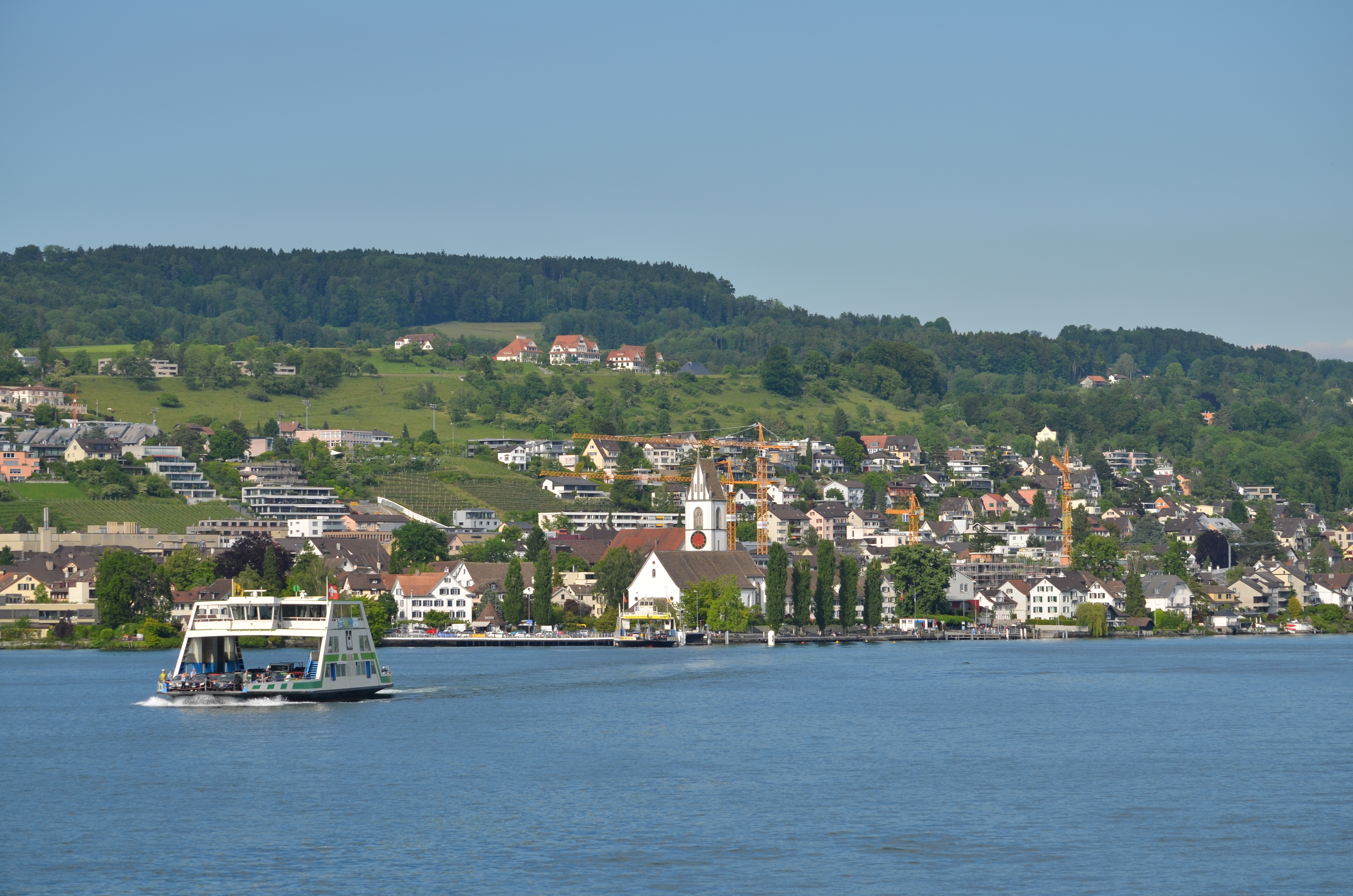
Meilen at Lake Zürich

Meilen has a population (as of 31 December 2020) of 14,539. As of 2007, 16.5% of the population was made up of foreign nationals. As of 2008 the gender distribution of the population was 47.6% male and 52.4% female. Over the last 10 years the population has grown at a rate of 12.2%. Most of the population (as of 2000) speaks German (87.6%), with Italian being second most common ( 2.4%) and English being third ( 1.7%).

In the 2007 election the most popular party was the SVP which received 34.1% of the vote. The next three most popular parties were the FDP (23.1%), the SPS (15.2%) and the CSP (10%).

year	population
1634	1,107
1697	1,590
1799	3,034
1850	3,065
1900	3,213
1950	5,992
1970	9,881
2000	11,480

The age distribution of the population (as of 2000) is children and teenagers (0–19 years old) make up 18.9% of the population, while adults (20–64 years old) make up 63% and seniors (over 64 years old) make up 18.1%. In Meilen about 83.9% of the population (between age 25–64) have completed either non-mandatory upper secondary education or additional higher education (either university or a Fachhochschule). There are 5315 households in Meilen.

Meilen has an unemployment rate of 2.06%. As of 2005, there were 151 people employed in the primary economic sector and about 41 businesses involved in this sector. 1514 people are employed in the secondary sector and there are 93 businesses in this sector. 3418 people are employed in the tertiary sector, with 482 businesses in this sector. As of 2007 43% of the working population were employed full-time, and 57% were employed part-time.

As of 2008 there were 3217 Catholics and 5337 Protestants in Meilen. In the 2000 census, religion was broken down into several smaller categories. From the census, 49.9% were some type of Protestant, with 47.9% belonging to the Swiss Reformed Church and 2% belonging to other Protestant churches. 26.5% of the population were Catholic. Of the rest of the population, 3% were Muslim, 5.3% belonged to another religion (not listed), 3% did not give a religion, and 14.7% were atheist or agnostic.

== Notable sights ==
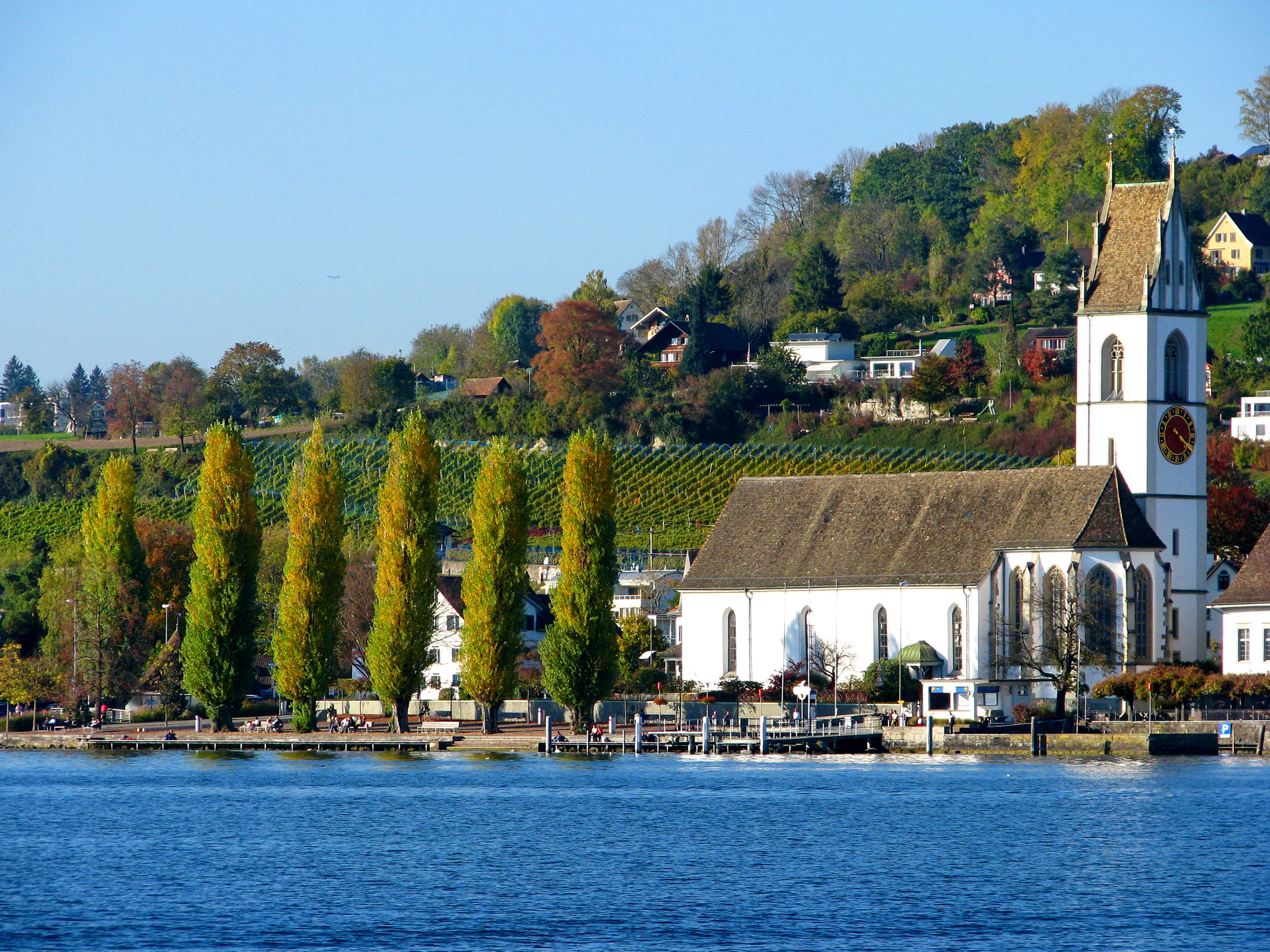
Meilen church and wine yards

The Protestant church is located at the lake side and dominates the views of the town from the lake. The church's history dates back to a chapel of the 7th century. The current church was built in 1493.

The oldest tavern in Meilen is the Löwen (Lion). The tavern is still in use, but since 1958 owned by the municipality. The main hall is now used for political and cultural events.

The inn zur Burg located at Friedberg (or locally known as Burg) was built in 1676. It is an attractive building with many carved ornaments.

There are also a number of mansions, including the Seehof, Seehalde and Grüene Hof. The Seehof mansion was built in 1767-1769 and originally home to the successful textile producer Felix Oeri-Lavater. The mansion Seehalde was built when trade in wine was at its best: the 16th century. The Grüene Hof mansion is located in Feldmeilen. It was built between 1682 and 1684.

== Cultural Heritage ==
Located on Zürichsee lakeshore, Meilen–Rorenhaab is part of the 56 Swiss sites of the UNESCO World Heritage Site Prehistoric pile dwellings around the Alps, and the settlement is also listed in the Swiss inventory of cultural property of national and regional significance as a Class object. Because the lake has grown in size over time, the original piles are now around 4 metres (13 ft) to 7 metres (23 ft) under the water level of 406 metres (1,332 ft).

== Transportation ==
There are two railway stations within the municipality. Meilen railway station is served by the S6 (daily, every 30 minutes), S7 (daily, every 30 minutes), S20 (One-way rush hour service) and SN7 (weekend night service) lines of the Zürich S-Bahn. Herrliberg-Feldmeilen station is served by lines S6 and S16. During the day the S16 line terminates at Herrliberg-Feldmeilen, but during early mornings and late evenings it is extended to Meilen.

Meilen also has a number of local bus routes, including route 925 and weekend night route N92 that operates to Uetikon, Männedorf and Stäfa.

In the summer there are regular boats along the lake to Zürich and Rapperswil, run by the Zürichsee-Schifffahrtsgesellschaft. The Horgen–Meilen car ferry connects Meilen with Horgen on the opposite shore of the lake, and one of that ferry line's ships carries the name Meilen.

== Notable people ==
- Ulrich Wille (1848 – 1925 in Meilen) the General of the Swiss Army during the First World War
- Rolf Larcher (born 1934 in Meilen) a Swiss rower, bronze medallist at the 1960 Summer Olympics
- Werner Hug (born 1952 in Feldmeilen) a Swiss chess player
- Magdalena Martullo-Blocher (born 1969) a Swiss billionaire businesswoman, politician and CEO of Ems-Chemie. She lives in Feldmeilen
