= Höhronen =

Mountain in Switzerland

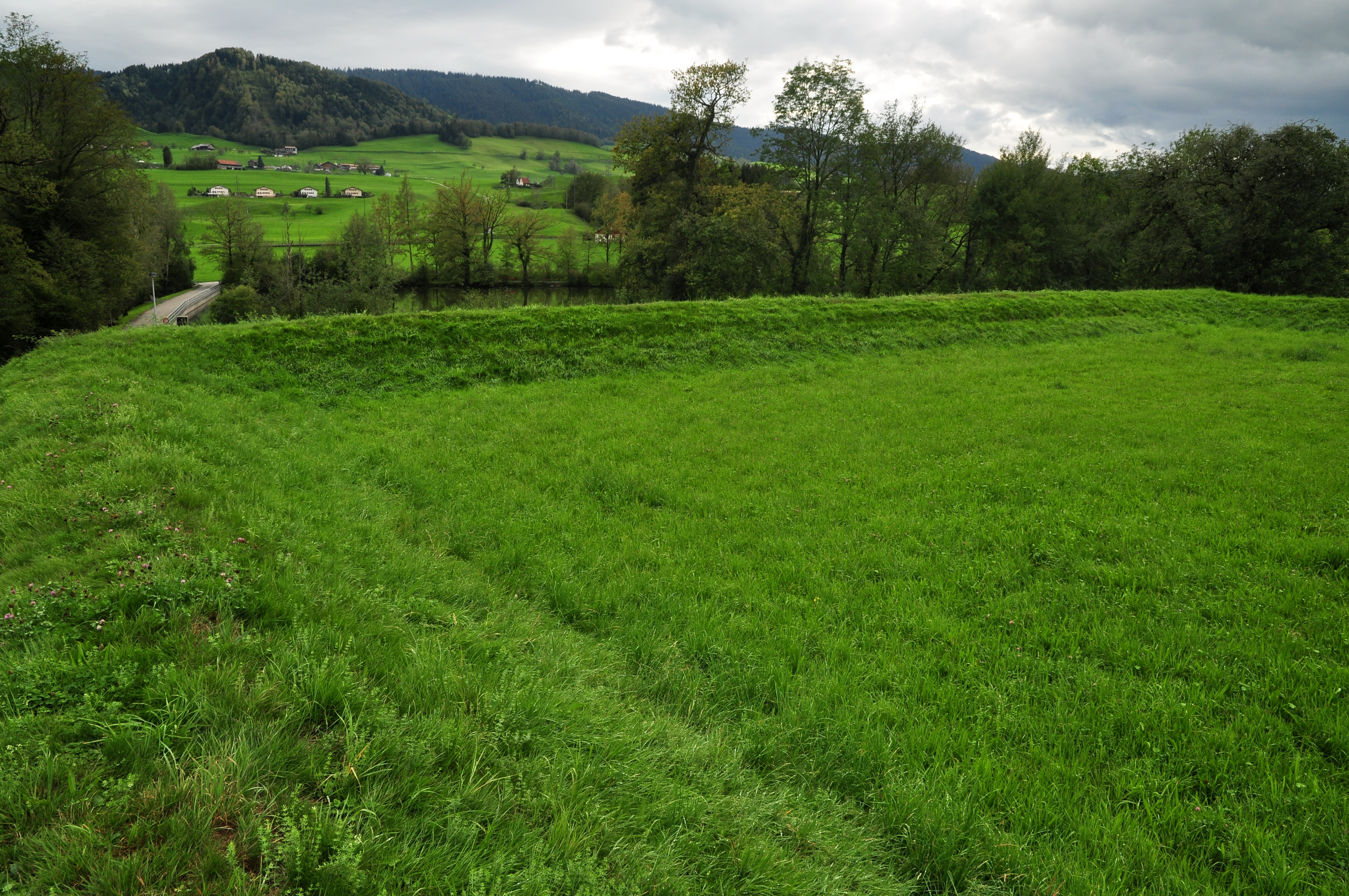
- The Höhronen (background centre) from the north side

Highest point
- Elevation: 1,229 m (4,032 ft)
- Prominence: 216 m (709 ft)
- Parent peak: Morgartenberg
- Coordinates: 47°09′38.0592″N 8°40′36.6636″E

Geography
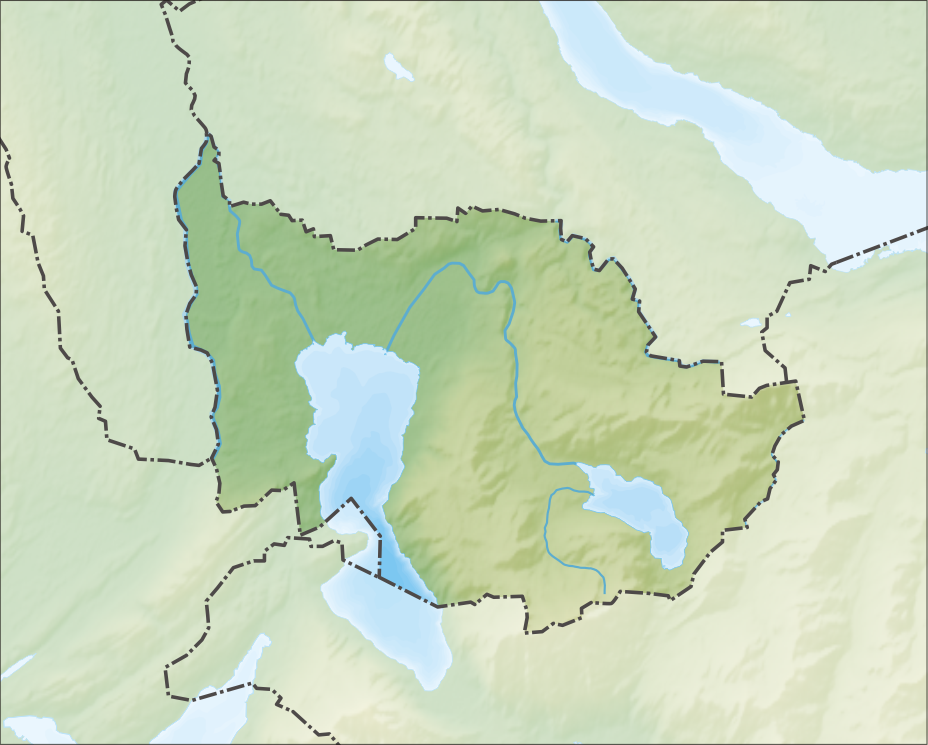
- Location within Switzerland Location within Canton of Zug Location within Canton of Zurich
- Location: Cantons of Zug and Zurich; Switzerland
- Parent range: Schwyzer Alps

The Höhronen is a mountain of the Swiss Prealps with an elevation of 1,229 metres (4,032 ft), located on the border between the Swiss cantons of Zug and Zurich. It lies approximately halfway between Lake Zurich and Lake Ägeri.

West of a secondary summit named Wildspitz (not to be confused with the nearby Wildspitz) with an elevation of 1,205 m (3,953 ft), is located the tripoint between the cantons of Zurich, Zug and Schwyz. The tripoint, located at a height of 1,186 metres (3,891 ft), is marked by a stone named Dreiländerstein (stone of the three lands).

== See also ==
- Etzel
