= Etzel (ship) =

Swiss motor ship

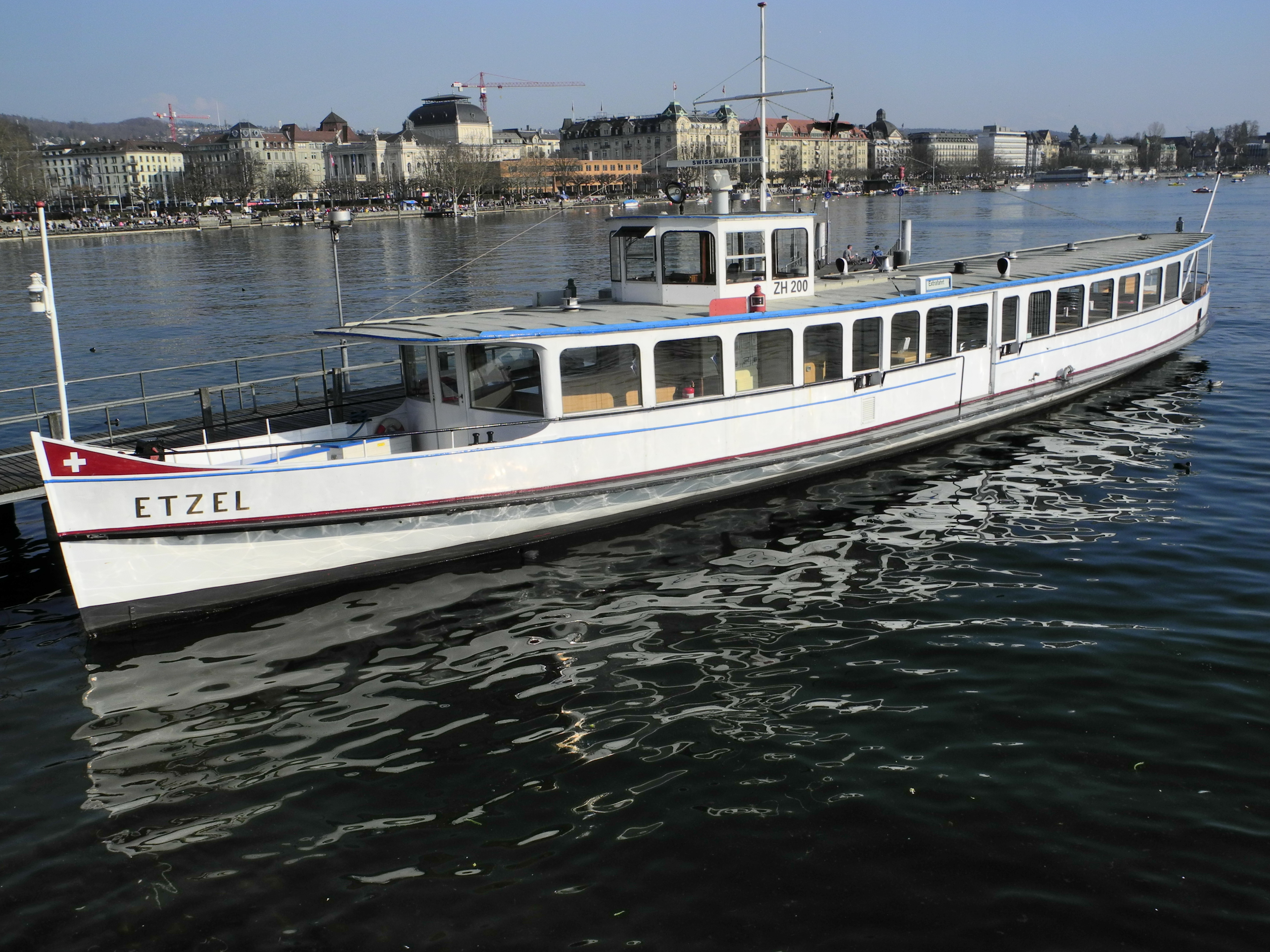
The MS Etzel

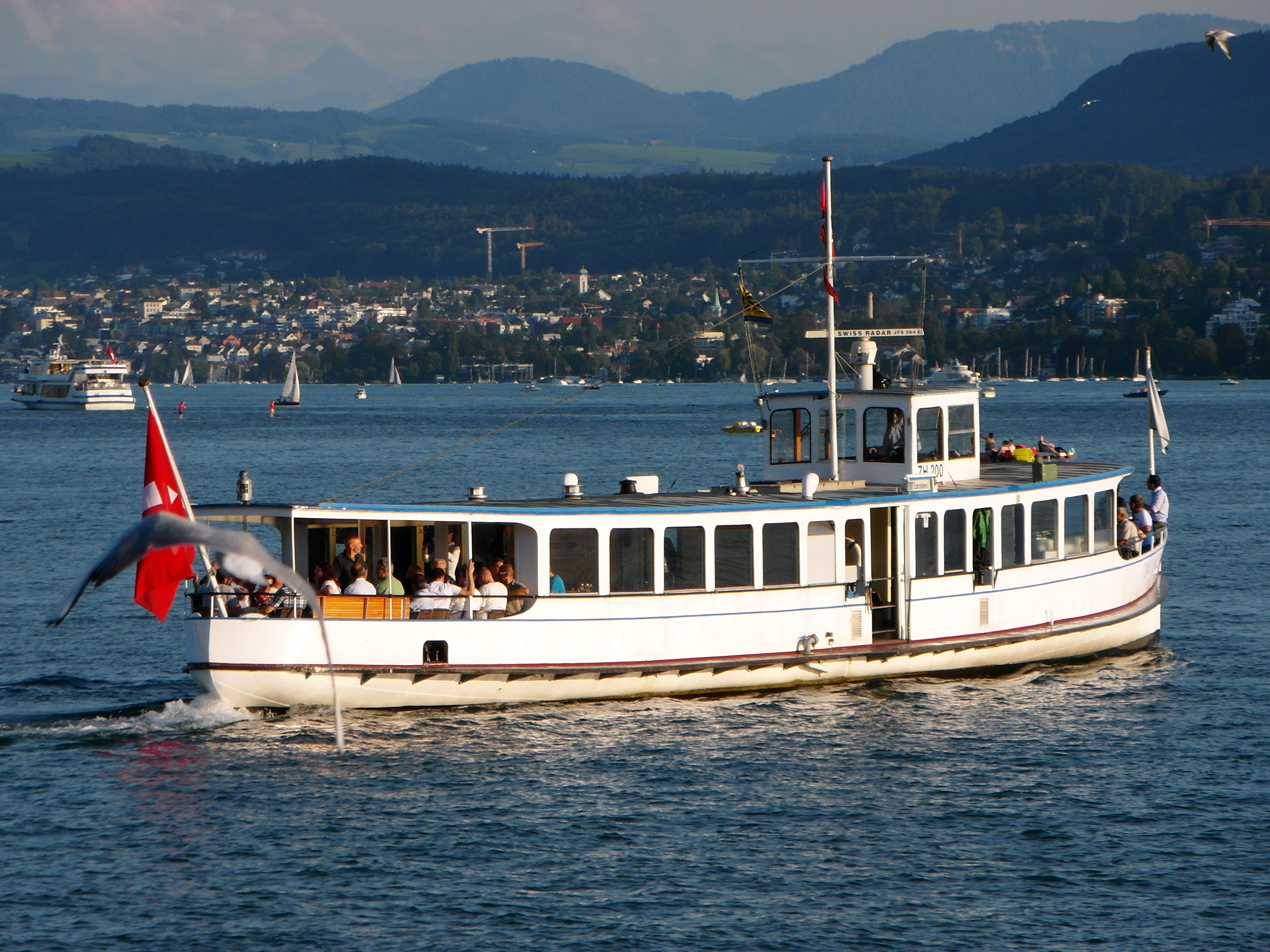
Under way

The MS Etzel is a preserved motor ship on Lake Zürich in Switzerland. She was built for the Zürichsee-Schifffahrtsgesellschaft (Lake Zurich Navigation Company) in 1934, and operated for them until she was retired in 2001. She is now owned and operated by the Etzel society, a society specifically created to preserve her.

The Etzel is named after the Etzel, a mountain overlooking Lake Zurich. She was built by Escher Wyss & Cie., has an overall length of 31.9 metres (105 ft), an overall width of 5.7 metres (19 ft), and a capacity of 150 passengers.

The Etzel is available for charter. The society which owns the ship also organises occasional excursions aboard the vessel.
