= Gunther von Etzel =

German general

Günther von Etzel
- Born: December 14, 1862; Magdeburg, Province of Saxony, Kingdom of Prussia
- Died: January 21, 1948 (aged 85); Wiesbaden, Allied-occupied Germany
- Military career
- Allegiance: German Empire
- Branch: Imperial German Army
- Service years: 1881–1919
- Rank: Generalleutnant
- Conflicts: World War I

Franz Hermann Günther von Etzel (December 14, 1862 – January 21, 1948) was a career soldier and general in the Imperial German Army, active in World War I.

== Biography ==
A native of Magdeburg, Etzel entered the Prussian Army in 1881. On September 19, 1901, he was promoted to the rank of major and was sent on May 29, 1902 as military attache to the German Embassy in Tokyo, Japan. During the Russo-Japanese War of 1904–1905, he was embedded within the Imperial Japanese Army and an official military observer. He remained in Japan as a military attaché until 1906.

After his return to Germany, he was promoted to lieutenant colonel on May 18, 1908 and assigned to the Kurmärkische Dragoon Regiment No. 14, a cavalry unit within the Prussian Army.

In the First World War, Etzel was made commander of the German 33rd Division, which participated in the initial German offensive on the Western Front. He was later commander of the Guards Cavalry Division and promoted to lieutenant general on January 27, 1918. From June 23, 1918 he commanded the German XVII Army Corps, and from August 27 of the same year, the German XVIII Army Corps.

He resigned from service on April 4, 1919, and went into retirement. He died in Wiesbaden in 1948.

== Honors ==
- Order of the Red Eagle, 3rd class with Swords on rings
- Order of the Crown, 3rd class with Swords (Prussia)
- Service award (Prussia)
- Military Merit Order, 3rd class (Bavaria)
- Knight's Cross of the House Order of the Wendish Crown (Mecklenburg)
- Military Merit Cross, 2nd class (Mecklenburg-Schwerin)
- Cross of Honour, 3rd class (Reuss)
- Order of the Rising Sun, 3rd class (Japan)
- Officer of the Order of the Crown of Italy
- Order of the Iron Crown, 3rd class (Austria)
- Order of St. Anna, 3rd class (Russia)
- Order of St. Stanislaus, 2nd class with Swords (Russia)
- Iron Cross of 1914, 1st and 2nd class
- Pour le Mérite, awarded 4 August 1917; with Oak Leaves, 26 October 1918.

== See also ==
- Otto von Etzel
- Military attachés and observers in the Russo-Japanese War
