= Werner Hug =

Swiss chess player (born 1952)

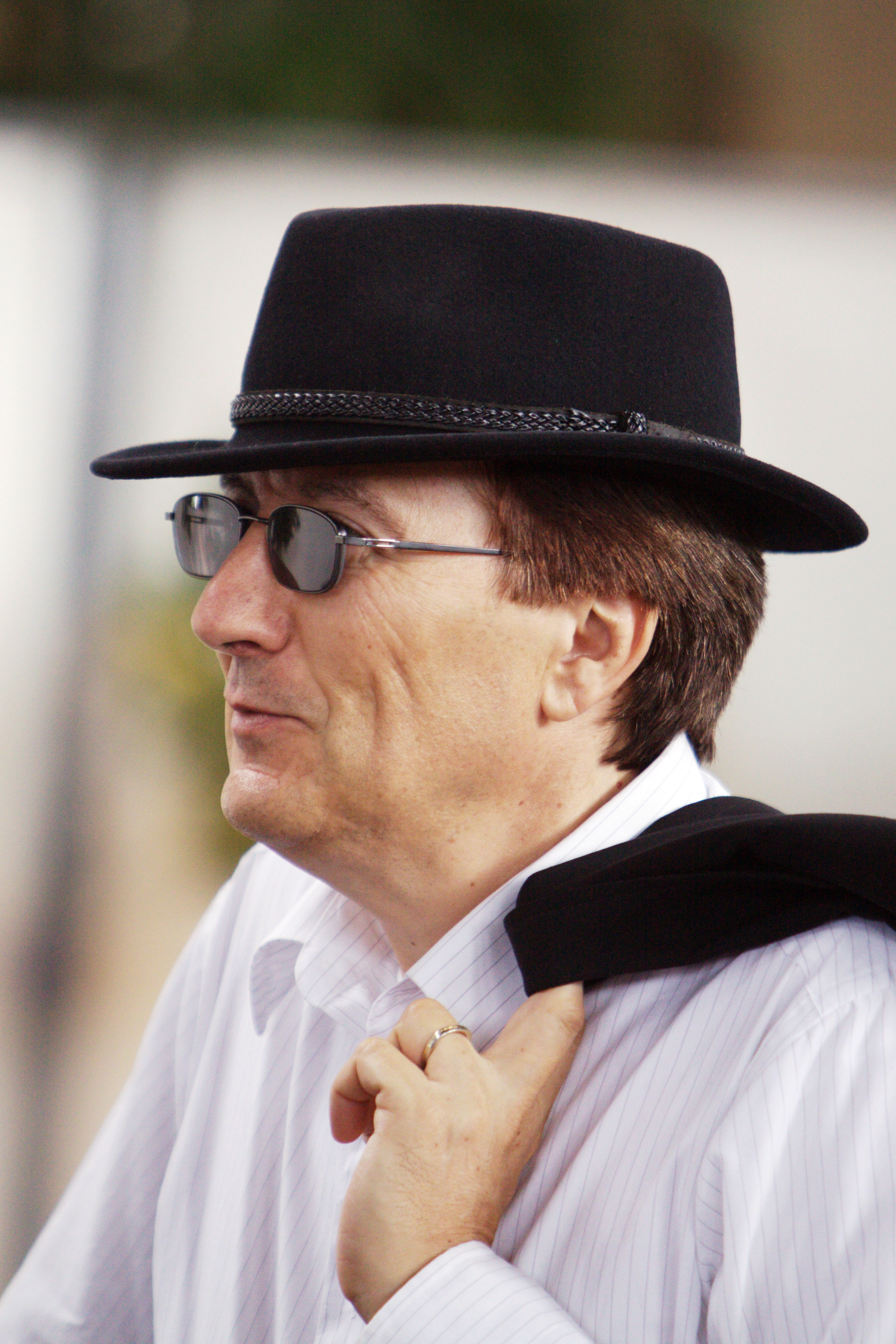
- Hug at Hauptbahnhof Zürich by Champions Simultan, 2009

Personal information
- Born: 10 September 1952 (age 74) Feldmeilen, Switzerland

Chess career
- Country: Switzerland
- Title: International Master (1971)
- FIDE rating: 2469 (November 2026)
- Peak rating: 2485 (September 2014)

Werner Hug (born 10 September 1952 in Feldmeilen) is a Swiss chess player. Hug was World Junior Chess Champion in 1971 and was Switzerland's leading player of the early 1970s. After Victor Korchnoi settled down in Switzerland, Hug remained number 2 a further decade.

In 1968 Hug won the Swiss Junior Championship. He was awarded the title of International Master (IM) in 1971, when he became World Junior Champion in Athens. He won the Swiss Championship in 1975.

Hug has played on the Swiss team in the Chess Olympiads eleven times, playing first board in 1972, 1974, 1976, 1980, and 1984. He also played first board in the World Student Olympiad in 1972 and 1976.
