= Otto von Etzel =

German soldier and diplomat

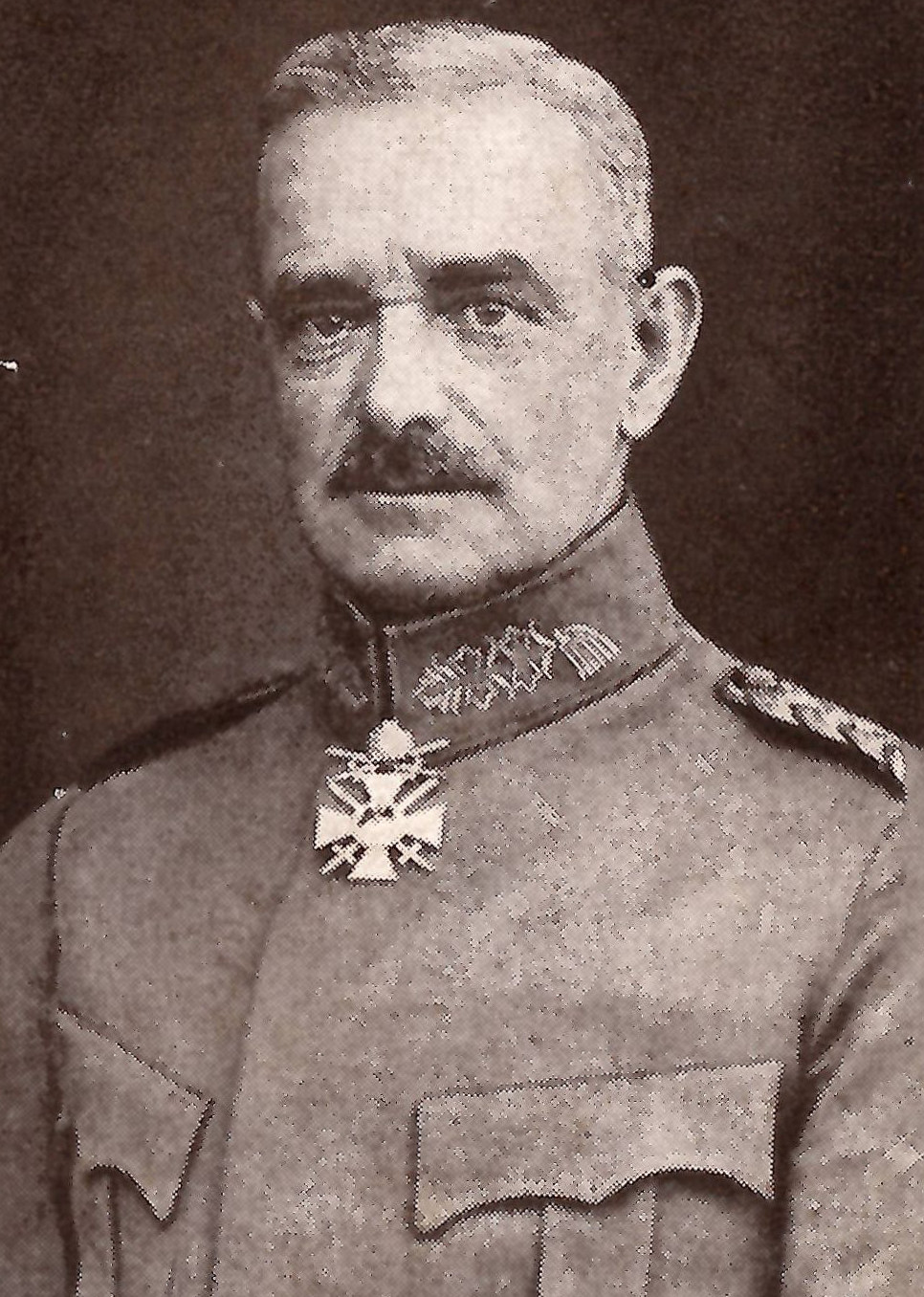
Image of Otto Etzel

Otto von Etzel (1860 – 1934) was a German soldier and diplomat.

In 1902–1908, he was German military attache in Washington, D.C.

On 25 November 1912 he married Margarete Friederike Ulrike Elise Mitzlaff (born 21 July 1878 in Berlin; died 25 March 1965 in Berlin). They had two sons, Joachim Franz Otto (born 24 August 1914 in Erfurt; died 23 February 1949 in Golubowka (Charkow), Ukraine) and Herbert Franz Hermann (born 3 December 1919 in Erfurt; died 26 February 2004 in Berlin).

== See also ==
- Gunther von Etzel
