= Etzel (mountain) =

Mountain in Switzerland

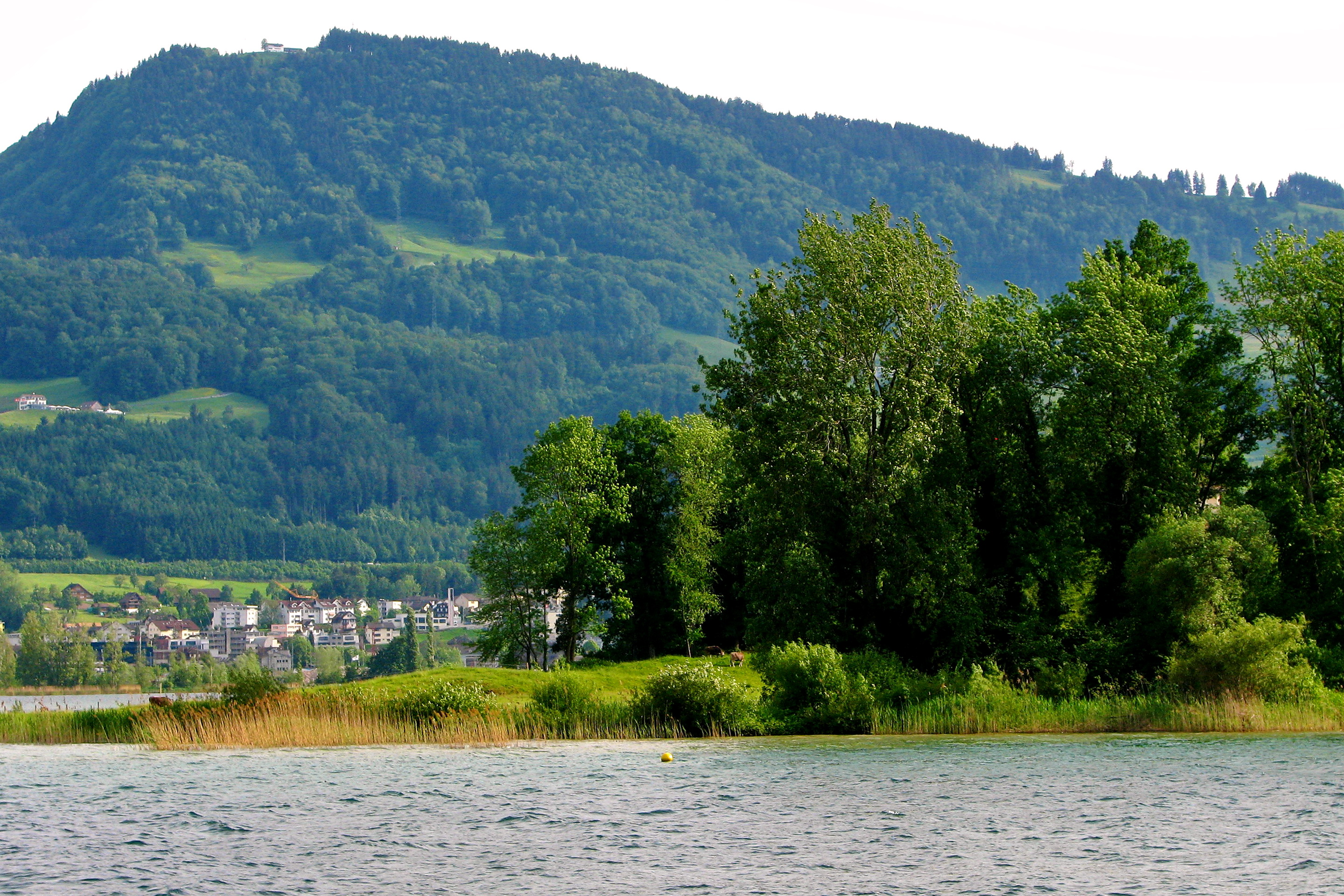
- Etzel as seen from the Lake Zurich, with Ufenau island in the foreground

Highest point
- Elevation: 1,098 m (3,602 ft)
- Prominence: 148 m (486 ft)
- Coordinates: 47°10′40″N 8°46′03″E

Geography
- Location within Switzerland Location within Canton of Schwyz
- Country: Switzerland
- Canton: Schwyz
- Parent range: Schwyzer Alps

The Etzel is a mountain on the south side of Lake Zurich in Switzerland. Although its elevation, of 1,098 metres (3,602 ft), is relatively modest, it is notable for its aspect when viewed from the lake and its surroundings. It is also well known for its views over Lake Zurich (including the Seedamm near Rapperswil), Lake Sihl and the Prealps and Alps. There is a mountain inn at the summit.

The mountain forms part of the Schwyzer Alps mountain range, and lies in the canton of Schwyz. Its summit and slopes are divided between the municipalities of Feusisberg, which lies to the north, and Einsiedeln, which lies to the south.

== Namesakes ==
The mountain has given its name to the 1934-built MV Etzel, now preserved on Lake Zurich. It has also given its name to a Stadler FLIRT electric multiple unit of Südostbahn (SOB).

== See also ==
- Höhronen
- List of mountains of the canton of Schwyz
