= Lake Zurich =

Major lake in Switzerland

- Zürichsee (German)
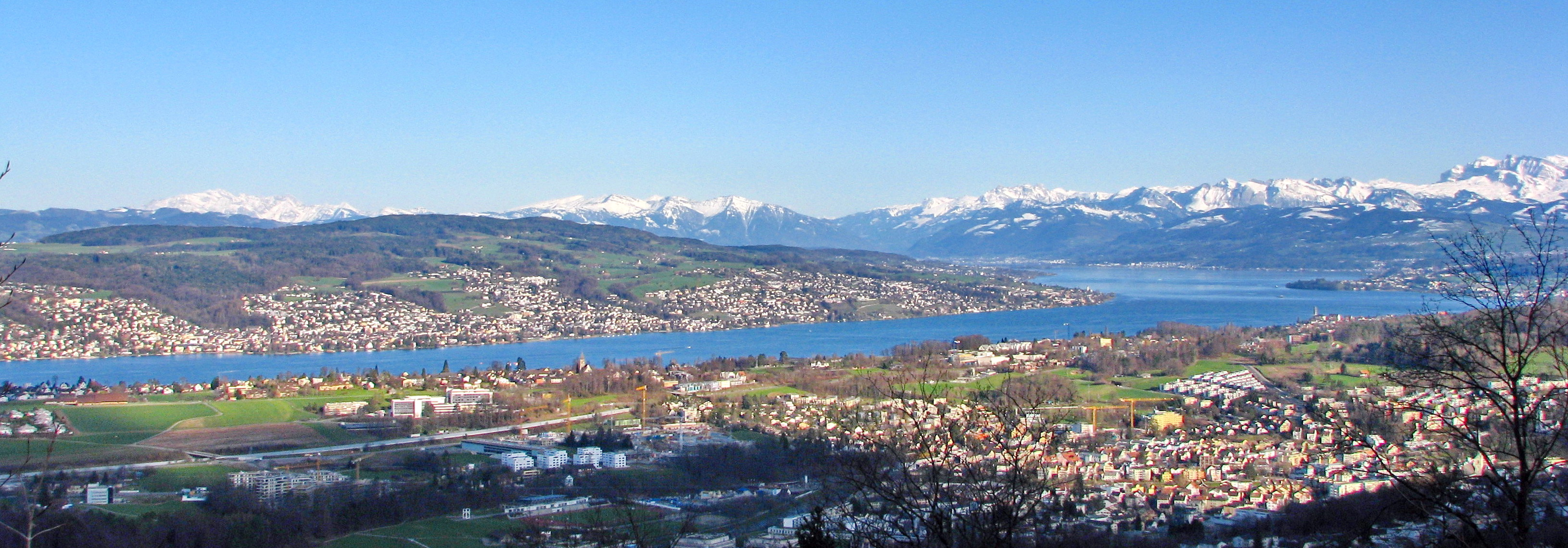
- Lake Zurich, Pfannenstiel, and Sihl Valley, as seen from Felsenegg

- Location within Canton of Zurich Location within Canton of Schwyz Location within Canton of St. Gallen Location within Switzerland Location within Alps
- Interactive map of Lake Zurich
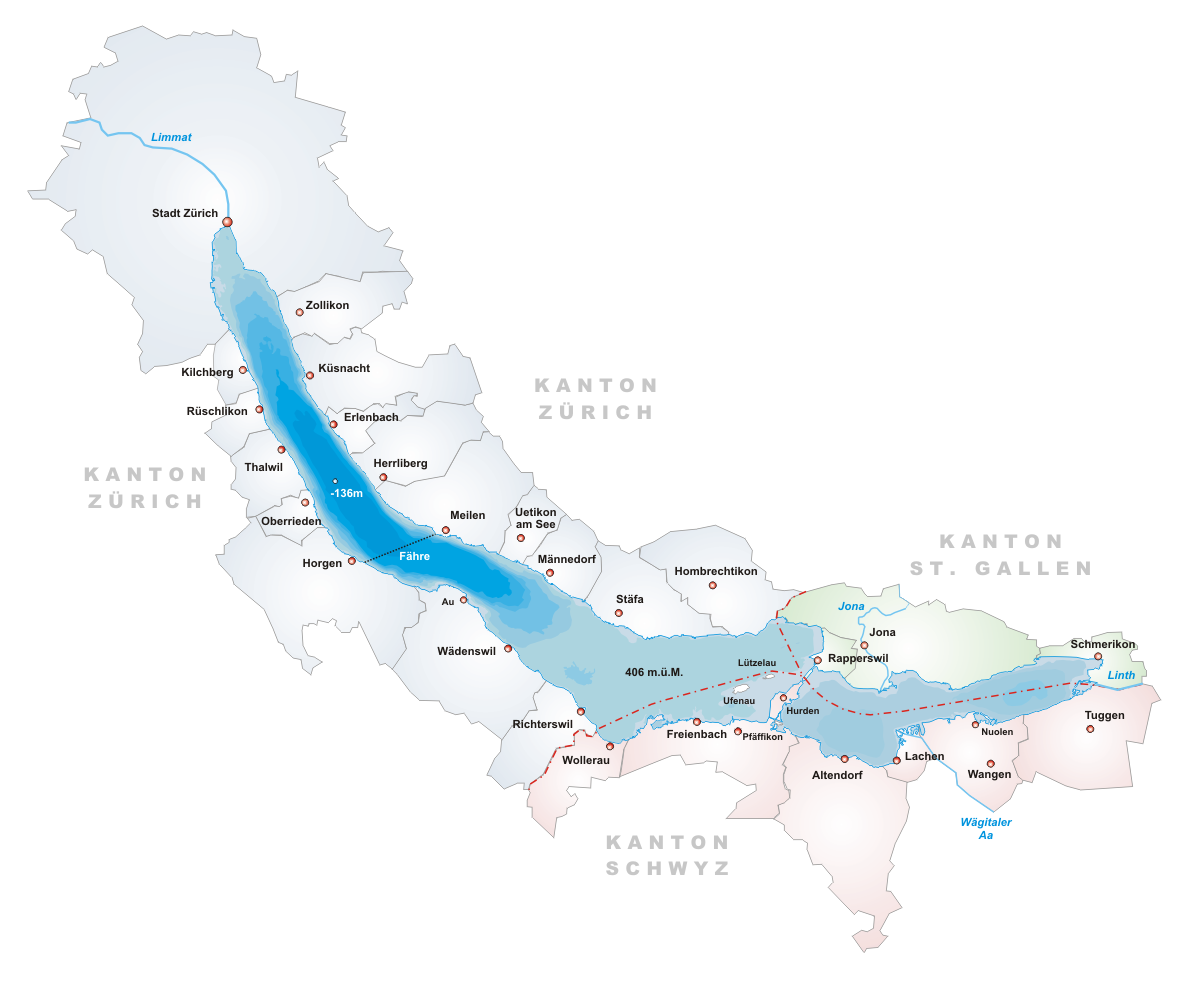
- Coordinates: 47°14′51″N 8°40′39″E
- Primary inflows: Linth (Linthkanal)
- Primary outflows: Limmat
- Catchment area: 1,829 km^{2} (706 sq mi)
- Basin countries: Switzerland
- Max. length: 40 kilometres (25 miles)
- Max. width: 3 kilometres (2 miles)
- Surface area: 88.66 square kilometres (34.23 square miles)
- Average depth: 49 metres (161 feet)
- Max. depth: 136 metres (446 feet)
- Water volume: 3.9 km^{3} (0.94 cu mi)
- Residence time: 440 days
- Surface elevation: 406 m (1,332 ft)
- Frozen: 1929, 1962/1963 (last)
- Islands: Lützelau, Schönenwerd, Saffa, Ufenau
- Sections/sub-basins: Obersee
- Settlements: see list

Lake Zurich (German: Zürichsee, Swiss Standard German pronunciation: [ˈtsyːrɪçˌzeː]; Alemannic German: Zürisee) is a lake in Switzerland, that extends southeast of the city of Zurich. Depending on the context, Lake Zurich or Zürichsee may refer to the entire lake or specifically to the section downstream of the Hurden peninsula and Seedamm causeway (between Pfäffikon and Rapperswil). In the latter case, the upstream part of the lake is called Obersee (lit. 'Upper Lake'), while the lower part is sometimes also referred to as the Lower Lake (unterer Zürichsee), respectively.

== Geography ==
Lake Zurich is a glacial lake that was formed by the Rhine-Linth glacier. Its main tributary is the river Linth, which rises in the glaciers of the Glarus Alps. The Linth originally flowed directly into Lake Zurich, but was later diverted by the Escher canal (completed in 1811) into Lake Walen (Walensee) from where its waters are now carried to the east end of Lake Zurich (near Schmerikon) via the straightened Linth Canal (completed in 1816). Until the early 16th century, there was another lake upstream of Obersee, Lake Tuggen (Tuggenersee) near Tuggen. Water exits Lake Zurich at its northwestern end (at the level of the Quaibrücke), passing through the city of Zurich. However, this outflow is known as the Limmat, a tributary of the Aare, which itself is a tributary of the High Rhine. The highest point in the lake's drainage basin is the Tödi, at 3,614 metres (11,857 ft) above sea level.

In addition to the Linth, other tributaries include the Jona, Schmerikoner Aa, Steinenbach, and Wägitaler Aa, which all flow into the Obersee, along with several creeks. The Seedamm, an artificial causeway and bridge, crosses the narrowest point of the lake at the level of the Hurden Peninsula, carrying a railway line and road from Rapperswil to Pfäffikon. The waterway is also crossed by the Holzbrücke Rapperswil-Hurden, a wooden pedestrian bridge. The eastern section of the lake is known as the Obersee (lit. 'Upper Lake'). West of the Seedamm lie the small islands of Lützelau and Ufenau, where in 1523 Ulrich von Hutten took refuge and died. Other islands include Grosser Hafner, Saffa Island and Schönenwerd (near Richterswil). A popular tourist destination is the Au peninsula at the village of Au between Wädenswil and Horgen. The lake shores are well cultivated and fertile. These include nature reserves such as Frauenwinkel and Bätzimatt. The bay of Rapperswil and reed in Nuolen are wintering areas for birds and popular sites for bird watching.

To the east, separated by Zürichberg-Adlisberg, Forch, and Pfannenstiel, are two smaller lakes, Greifensee (lit. 'Lake Greifen') and Pfäffikersee (lit. 'Lake Pfäffikon'). There are several minor lakes and ponds in the vicinity, such as Egelsee, Lützelsee or Türlersee. Zimmerberg, Etzel and Buechberg mountains lie to the west and south of the lake, respectively. Further to the east, the Speer, Chüemettler and Federispitz can be seen from the southern part of the lake.

Administratively, Lake Zurich is split between the cantons of Zurich (Horgen District), St. Gallen (See-Gaster) and Schwyz (Höfe and March districts). The lower lake, to the west of the Seedamm, is largely in the canton of Zurich, while the upper lake is shared between the cantons of St. Gallen and Schwyz.

=== Tributaries of lower lake ===
The following rivers or streams flow into lower part of Lake Zurich. From the Limmat clockwise, they are:

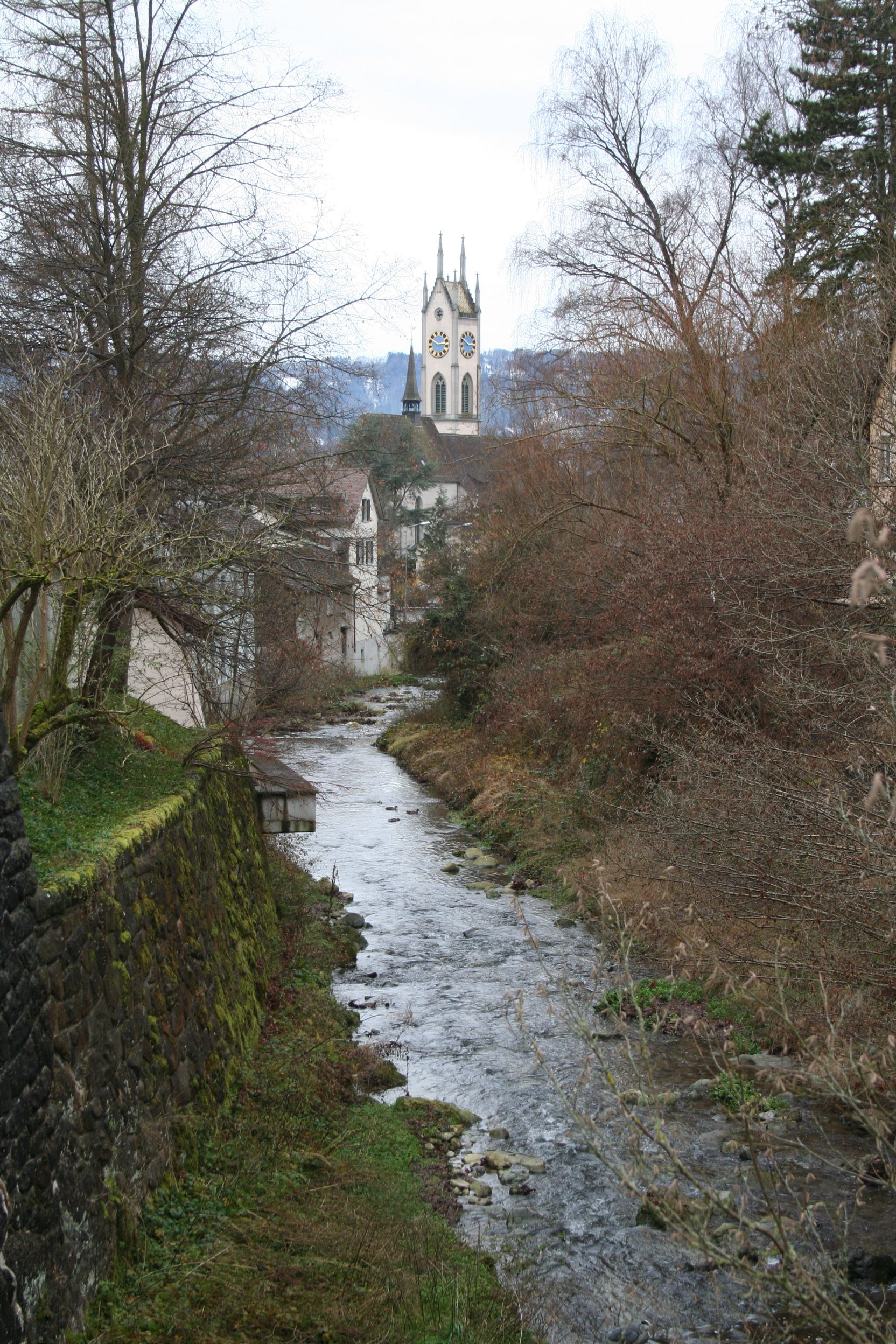
Küsnachter Dorfbach and Küsnacht's Reformed Church

- Hornbach (at Zürichhorn)
- Düggelbach (at Zollikon)
- Kusenbach (at Küsnacht)
- Küsnachter Dorfbach (at Hornelanpark, Küsnacht)
- Heslibach (at Erlenbach)
- Dorfbach Erlenbach (at Erlenbach)
- Tobelbächli (at Erlenbach)
- Schipfbach (at Erlenbach)
- Rossbach (at Herrliberg)
- Meilener Dorfbach (at Meilen)
- Beugenbach (at Meilen)
- Aebletenbach (at Ländeli, Meilen)
- Uetiker Mulibach (at Meilen)
- Feldbach (at Horn)
- Sarenbach (at Freienbach)
- Krebsbach (at Bäch, Freienbach)
- Mülibach (at Richterswil)
- Zürichsee (at Wädenswil)
- Meilibach (at Wädenswil)
- Schanzengraben (Zurich)

== Coastal settlements ==
Zurich, at the north-western end of the lake, is the largest city on Lake Zurich. The least populous is Hurden.

On the west shore (which gradually becomes the south shore) are Kilchberg, Rüschlikon, Thalwil, Oberrieden, Horgen, Au, Wädenswil and Richterswil in the canton of Zurich, and Freienbach, Pfäffikon, Hurden, Altendorf, Lachen, Nuolen and Tuggen in the canton of Schwyz.

On the opposite shore, which gradually becomes the northern shore towards east, are Zollikon, Küsnacht, Erlenbach, Herrliberg, Feldmeilen, Meilen, Stäfa, and Feldbach in the canton of Zurich, and Rapperswil-Jona. The latter includes the medieval town of Rapperswil, whose castle is home to the Polish museum, and the coastal villages of Kempraten, Busskirch and Bollingen. The municipalities of Rapperswil-Jona and Schmerikon, which is close to the east end of the lake, are both in the canton of St. Gallen. A little further east is the larger town of Uznach.

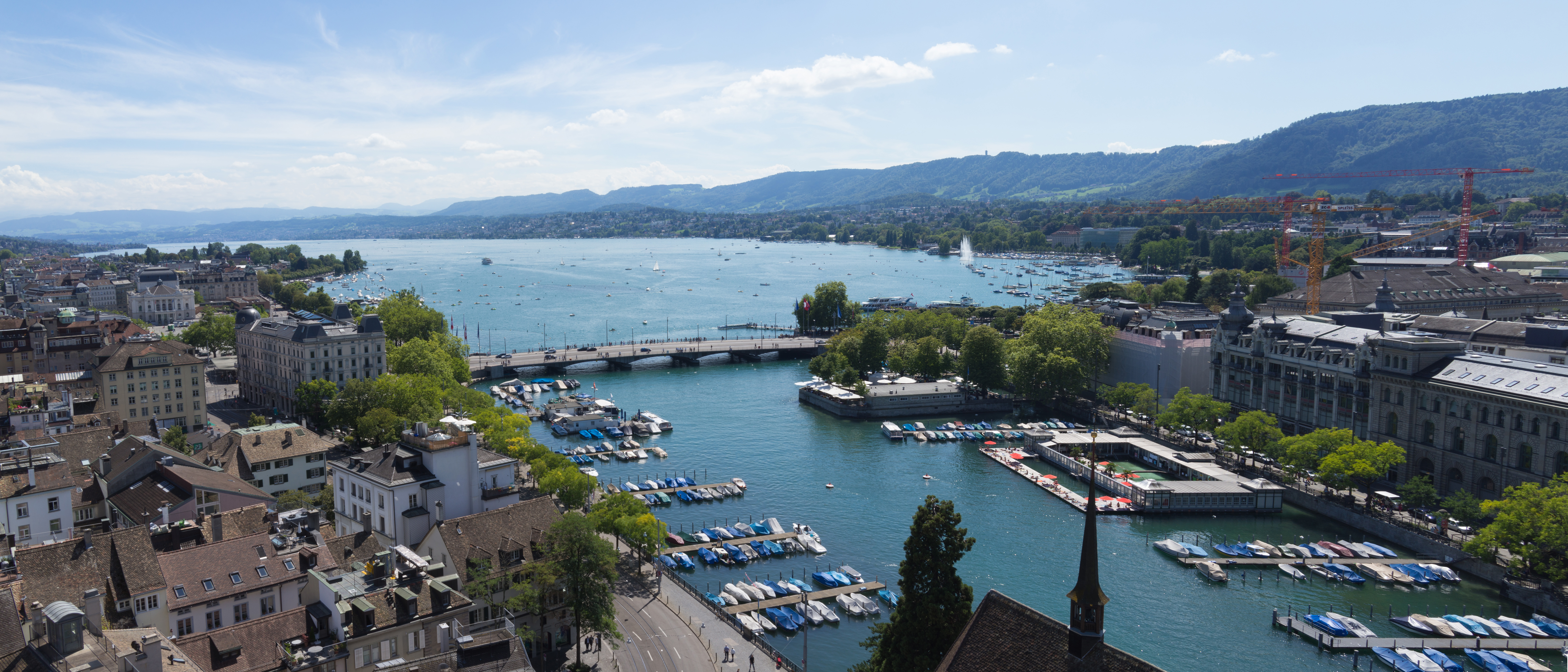
Lake Zurich from Grossmünster with Quaibrücke and the Limmat in the foreground

=== Prehistoric pile dwellings and historic settlements ===
Nine Prehistoric pile dwellings around Zürichsee, which are located in the cantons of Schwyz, St. Gallen and Zurich, are among the 56 Prehistoric pile dwellings around the Alps in Switzerland.

These nine sites on the Lake Zurich lakeshore are Freienbach–Hurden Rosshorn, Freienbach–Hurden Seefeld, Rapperswil-Jona/Hombrechtikon–Feldbach, Rapperswil-Jona–Technikum, Erlenbach–Winkel, Meilen–Rorenhaab, Wädenswil–Vorder Au, Zurich–Enge Alpenquai, and Kleiner Hafner. Because the lake has grown in size over time, the original piles are now around 4 metres (13 ft) to 7 metres (23 ft) under the water level of 406 metres (1,332 ft). Two other sites are not far away: Greifensee–Storen/Wildsberg at the Greifensee and Wetzikon–Robenhausen at the Pfäffikersee.

As well as being part of the 56 Swiss sites of the UNESCO World Heritage Site, each of these 11 prehistoric pile dwellings is also listed as a Class object in the Swiss inventory of cultural property of national and regional significance.

In Kempraten (Rapperswil-Jona municipality), there was a Roman vicus named Centum Prata. Another settlement was Turicum in Zurich.

== Transportation ==
The main public and private transportation nodes around the lake are the city of Zurich and — given the presence of the Seedamm causeway — Pfäffikon and Rapperswil. Besides Quaibrücke in Zurich and the Seedamm, there are no bridges across the lake. In addition, the towns of Meilen and Horgen are connected by a car ferry. The lake lies within the Zürcher Verkehrsverbund (ZVV) fare zones, but the railway and bus routes around Obersee are partly within the OSTWIND fare zone.

=== Trams and buses ===
Bus routes on the western shore are operated by Zimmerberg Bus. On the eastern side, the VZO provides bus services along the lake shore and to the Zürcher Oberland. VZO also operates the urban bus routes in Rapperswil and Jona. At the northern end of the lake, in Zurich, public transport consists of trams, trolleybuses and motor buses of VBZ.

=== Rail ===
Left bank: The towns on the western and southern shores of Lake Zurich are linked by the Lake Zurich left bank railway line, which connects Zürich HB with Ziegelbrücke. This line is served by the S2, S8, S24 and S25 of the Zurich S-Bahn and InterRegio (IR) trains. It is also used by EuroCity (EC), Intercity Express (ICE), Intercity (IC) and Railjet (RJX) trains but they do not call at stations along the lake. At Wädenswil, the line connects to the Wädenswil–Einsiedeln railway to Einsiedeln, served by the S13.

Right bank: Towns on the eastern shore of the lower lake (also known as the Goldcoast, or Goldküste) are connected by the Lake Zurich right bank railway line between Zürich HB and Rapperswil. This line is served by S-Bahn services S6, S7, S16 and S20 of Zurich S-Bahn.

The Rapperswil–Ziegelbrücke railway line along the northern shore of Obersee is served by St. Gallen S-Bahn services S4, S6 and S17, and the Voralpen Express. This line connects Rapperswil with Schmerikon on the eastern end of the lake via Blumenau. Bollingen is a ghost station since 2004.

Seedamm: The Rapperswil–Pfäffikon railway line across the Seedamm and Hurden Peninsula is served by Zurich S-Bahn services S5 and S40 and the Voralpen Express. This short line connects Rapperswil with Pfäffikon SZ via Hurden.

=== Shipping ===
The Zürichsee-Schifffahrtsgesellschaft (ZSG) – lit. 'the Lake Zurich Navigation Company' – provides with its 17-passenger ships touristic services on Lake Zurich. There are a number of passenger ferry services, notably the Horgen–Meilen ferry, an auto ferry between Horgen and Meilen.

Since 2025, the former MS Uetliberg has a 20 ton battery (the largest ever installed in a ship in Europe) and two electric motors. The ship thus saves 113,000 liters of diesel, or 300 tons of CO₂, annually. The batteries are charged overnight with green electricity at the shipyard in Zurich-Wollishofen. The ship, now called EMS Uetliberg, has space for 300 passengers. The sister ships MS Albis and MS Pfannenstiel will also be converted and electrified - one in winter 2025/26 and one in 2026/27.

=== Road ===
The A3 motorway and Hauptstrasse 3 follow the western and southern shores of Lake Zurich. The Hauptstrasse 8 crosses the Seedamm, and the Hauptstrasse 17 runs along the eastern lake shore.

The Lakes Route, one of the national bike routes, runs across the Seedamm and then follows the northern shore of Obersee. There are other bike routes along the eastern and western lake shores.

== Freeze over ==
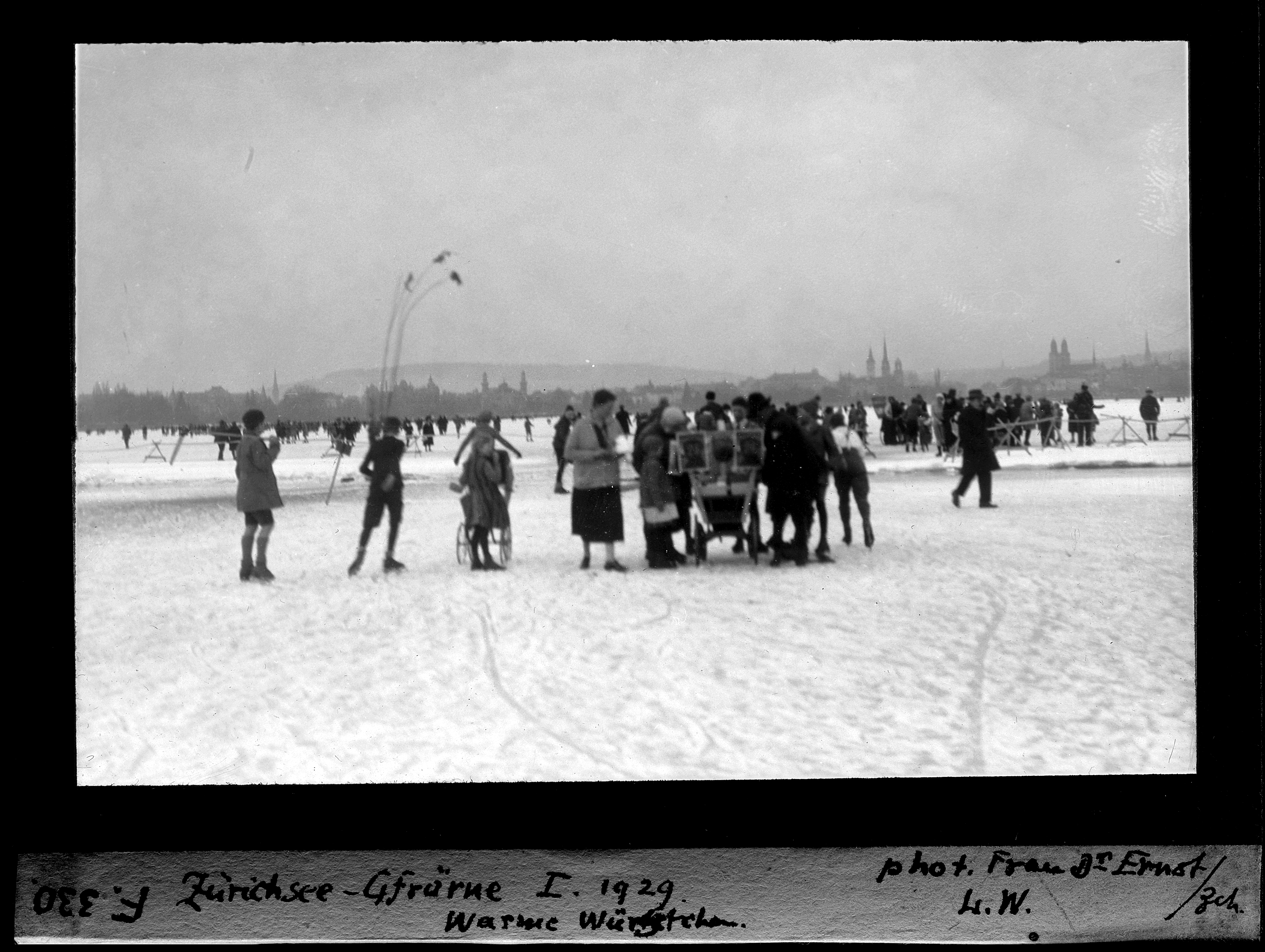
Frozen lake in 1929 (Grossmünster in the background)

The freezing of Lake Zurich, called Seegfrörni in Swiss German, is a rare and spectacular event. The lake was frozen in the following Common Era/Anno Domini years (1963 was the last time). Years 1223 to 1963 are based on (see list at the end of the article) and, for 1435 see.

- 1223, 1259, 1262
- 1407, 1435, 1491
- 1514, 1517, 1573
- 1600, 1660, 1684, 1695
- 1709, 1716, 1718, 1740, 1755, 1763, 1789
- 1830, 1880, 1891, 1895
- 1929, 1963

== Water quality ==
Lake Zurich's water is very clean and reaches, during summer, temperatures well beyond 20 °C (68 °F). Swimming in the public baths and beaches is very popular. The lake's water is purified and fed into Zurich's water system; it is potable.

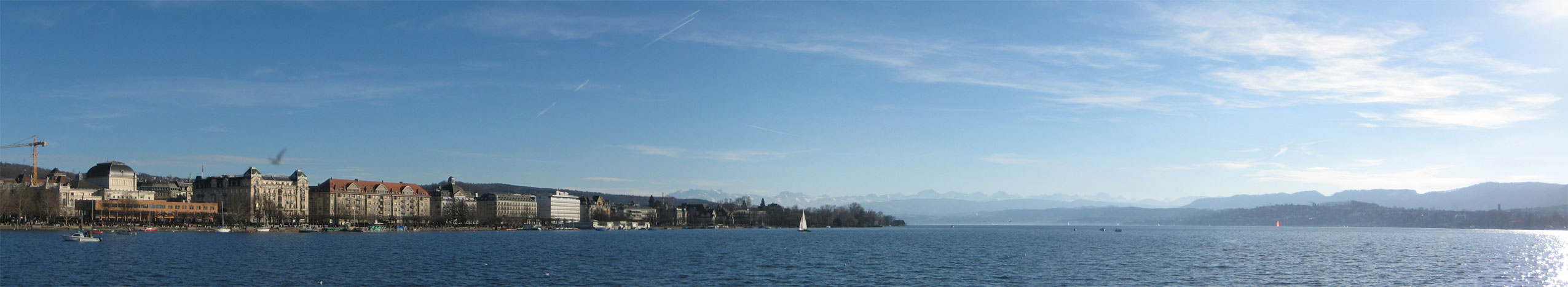
Lake Zurich view from Zurich to the Alps

== Gallery ==
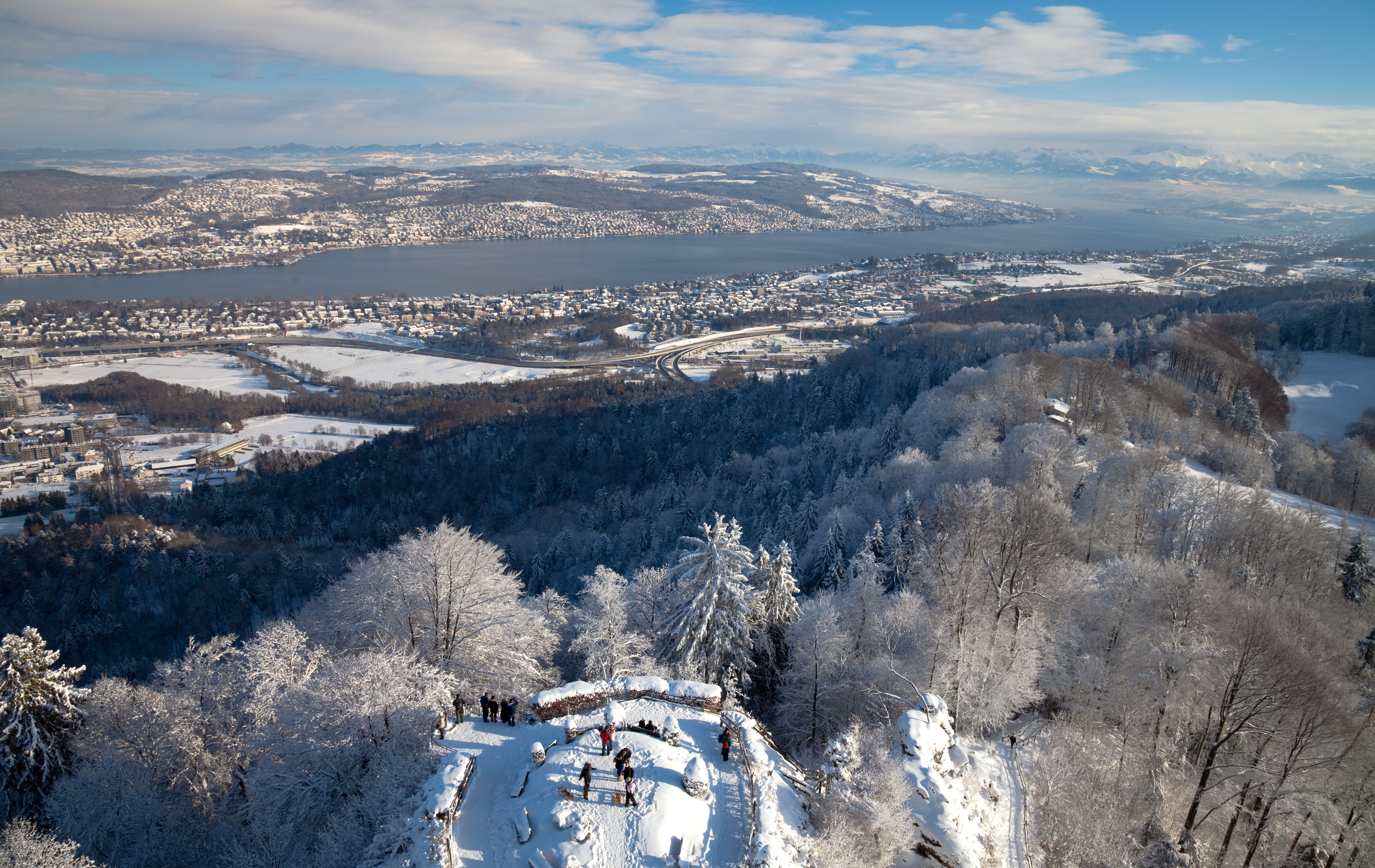
View from the top of the observation tower at Uetliberg

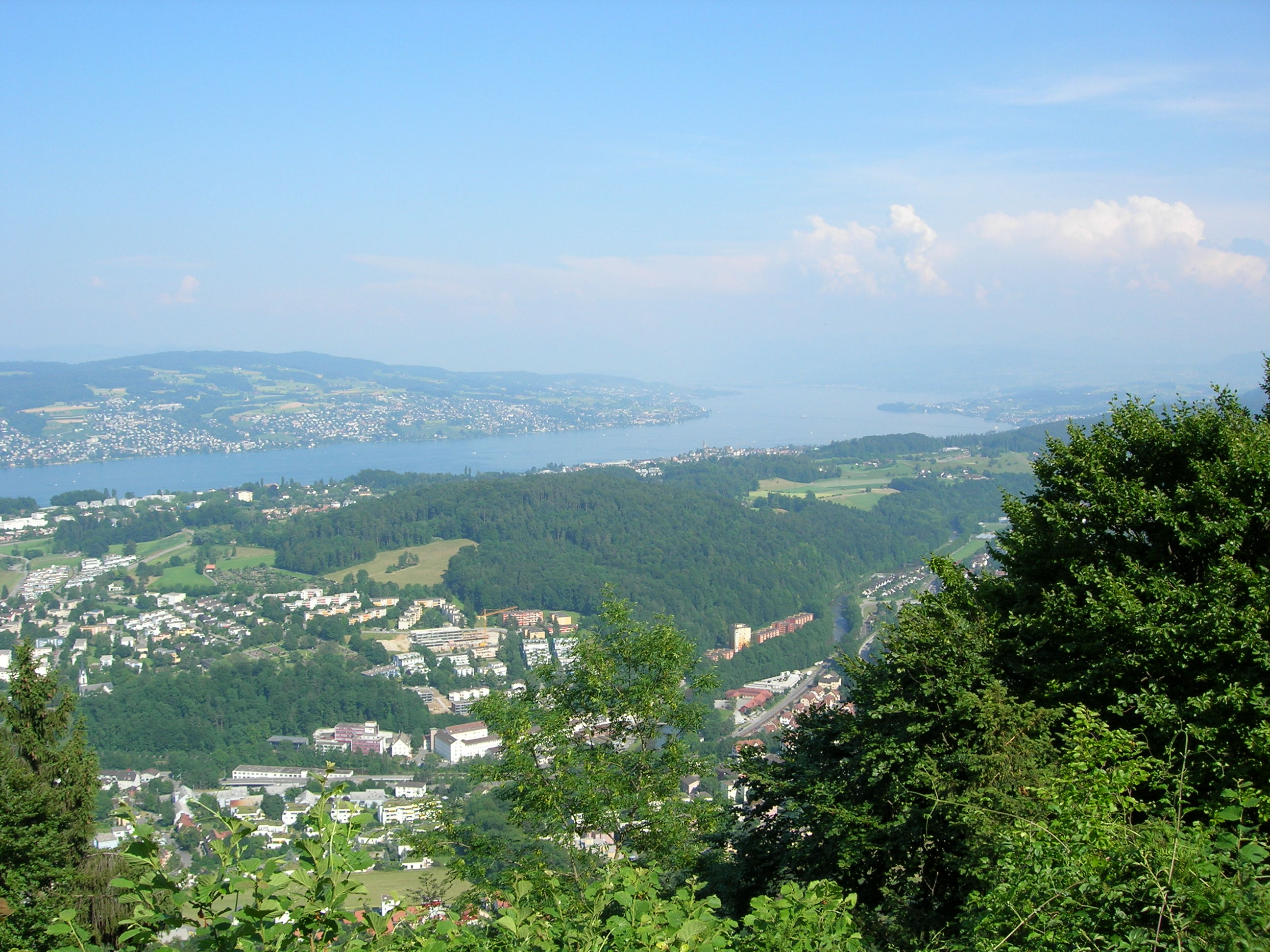
View from Felsenegg to the eastern part of Lake Zurich

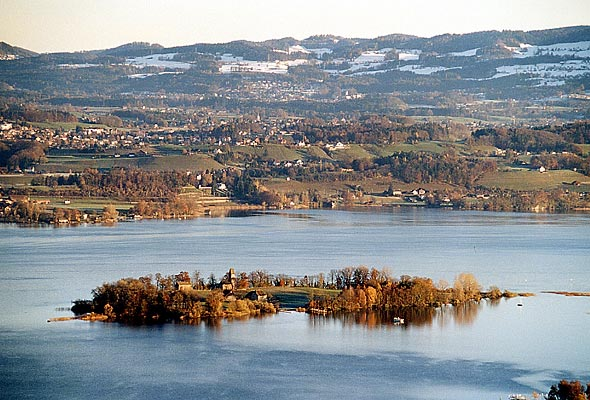
Ufenau island

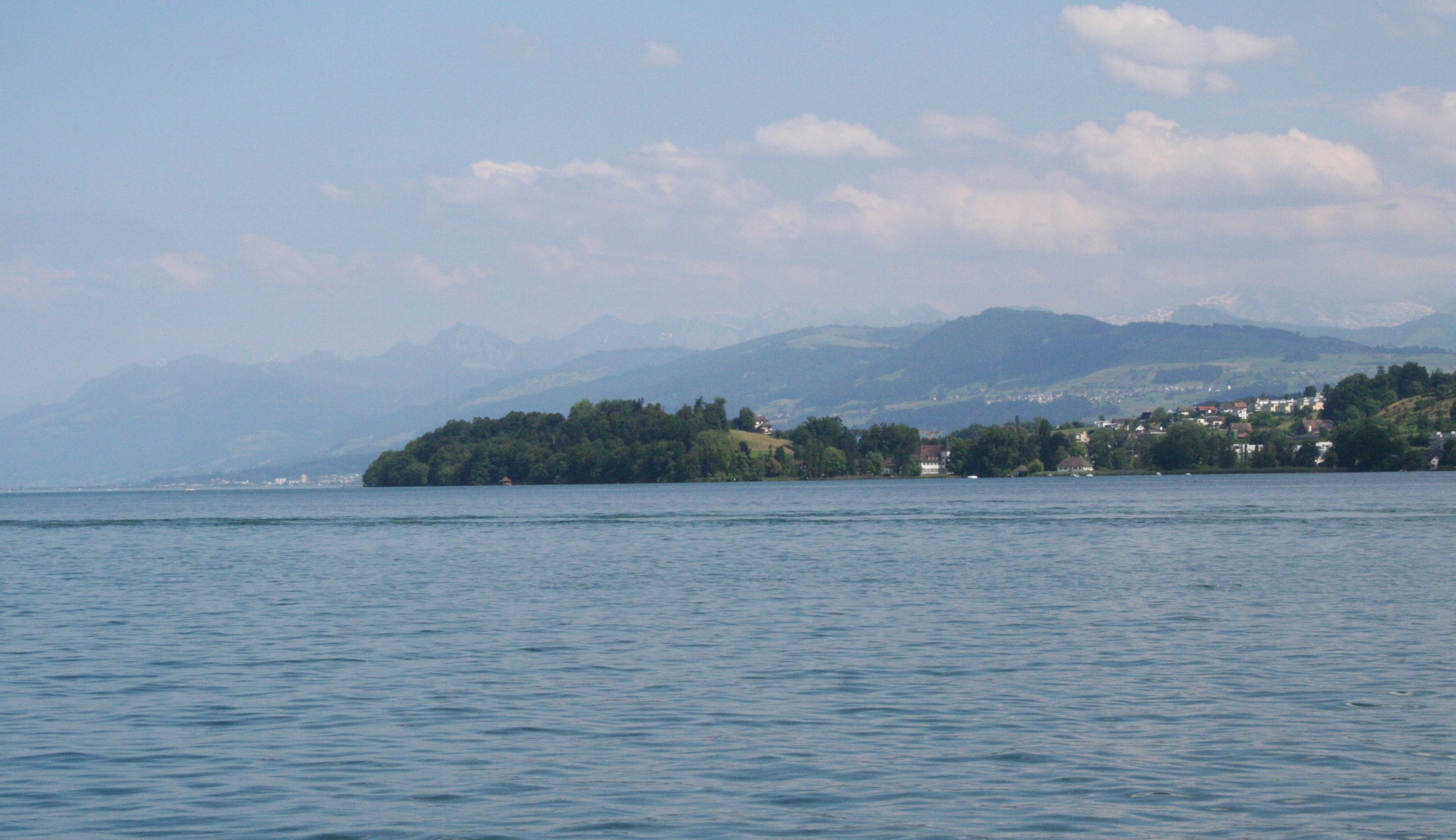
Au peninsula

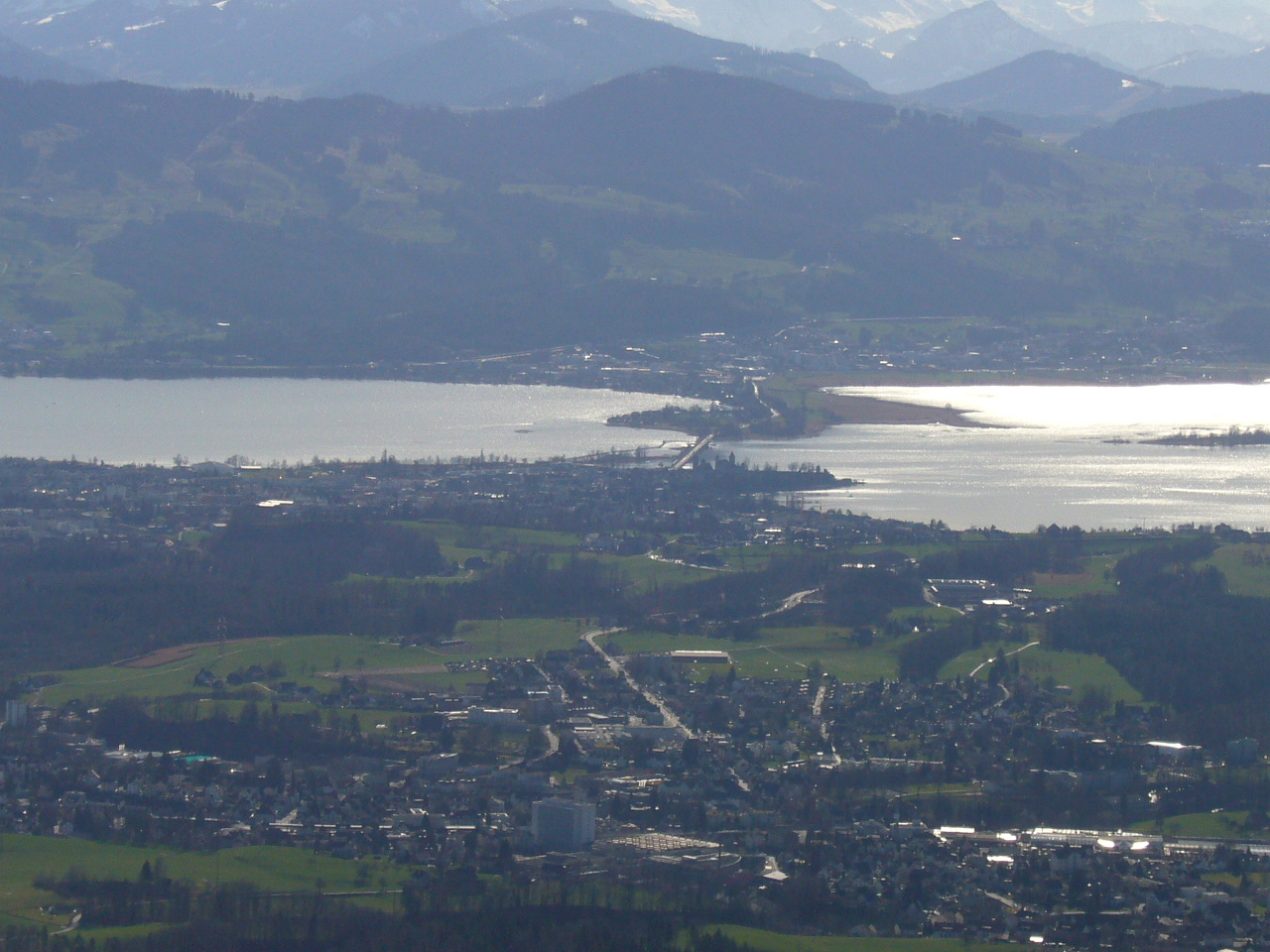
Seedamm between Rapperswil and Hurden, view from Bachtel hill

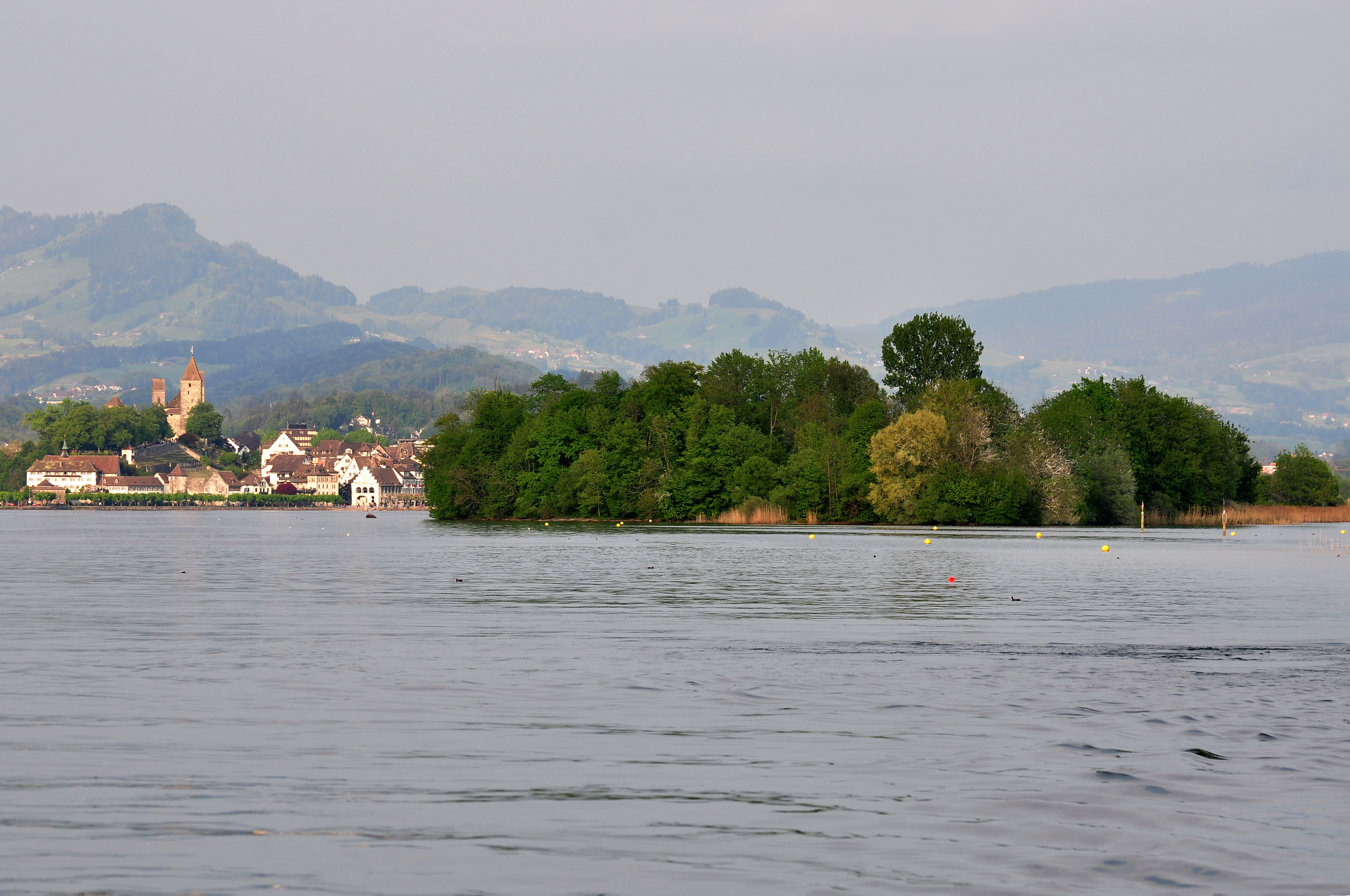
Lützelau and Rapperswil, view from Ufenau island

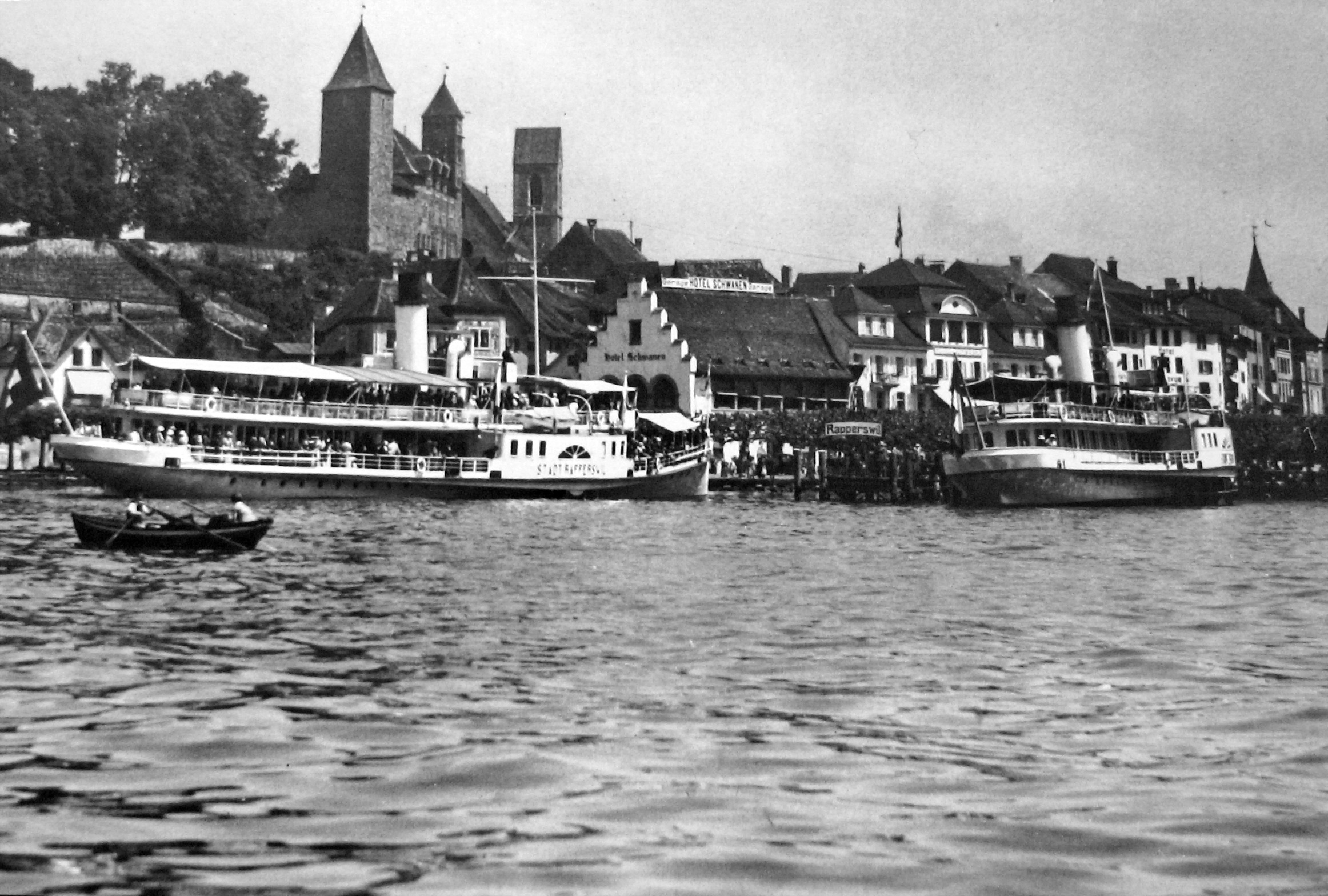
Paddle steamships Stadt Rapperswil (to the left) and Stadt Zürich (1914) at Rapperswil (SG) harbour

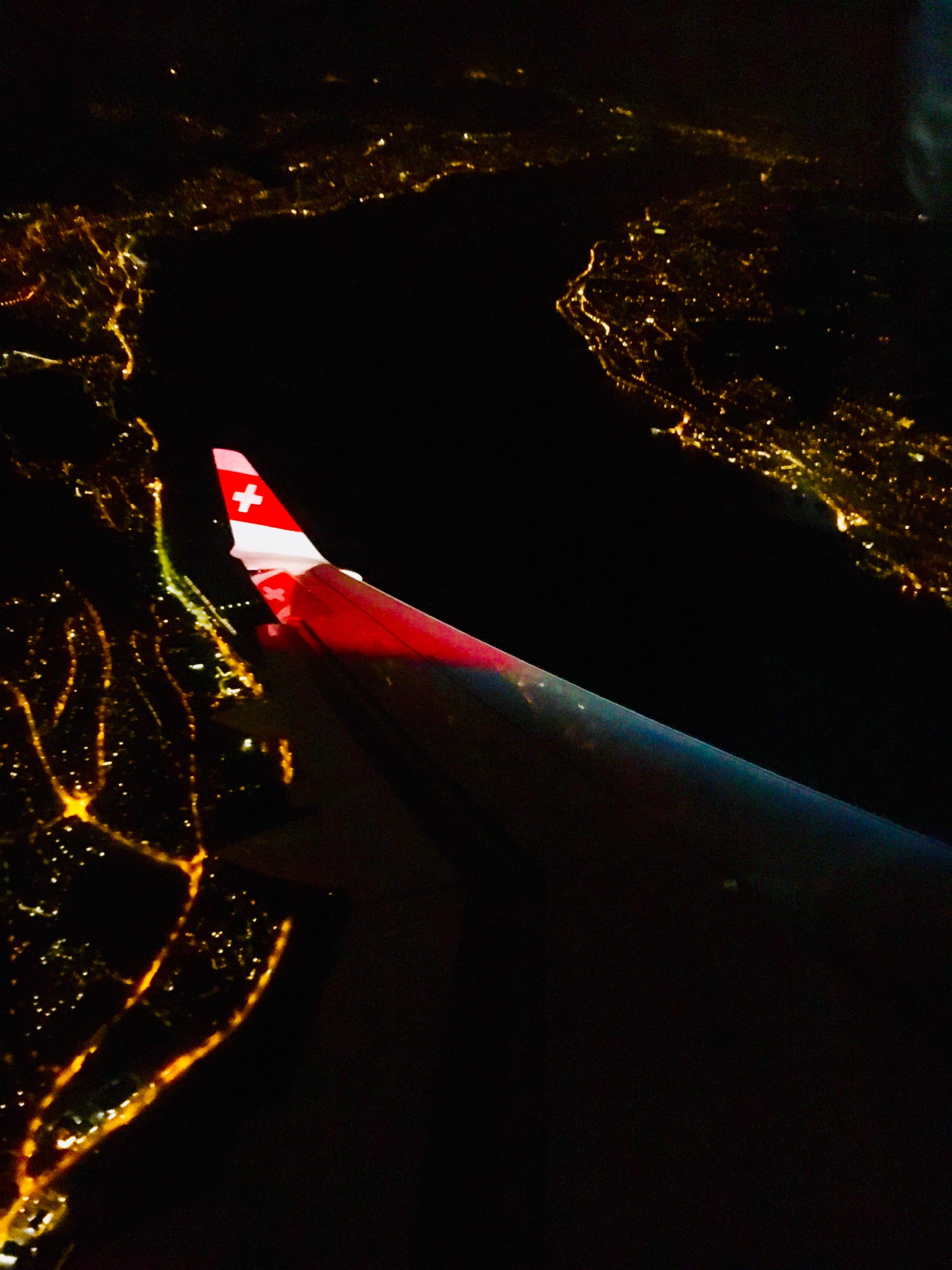
Zurisee from an airplane

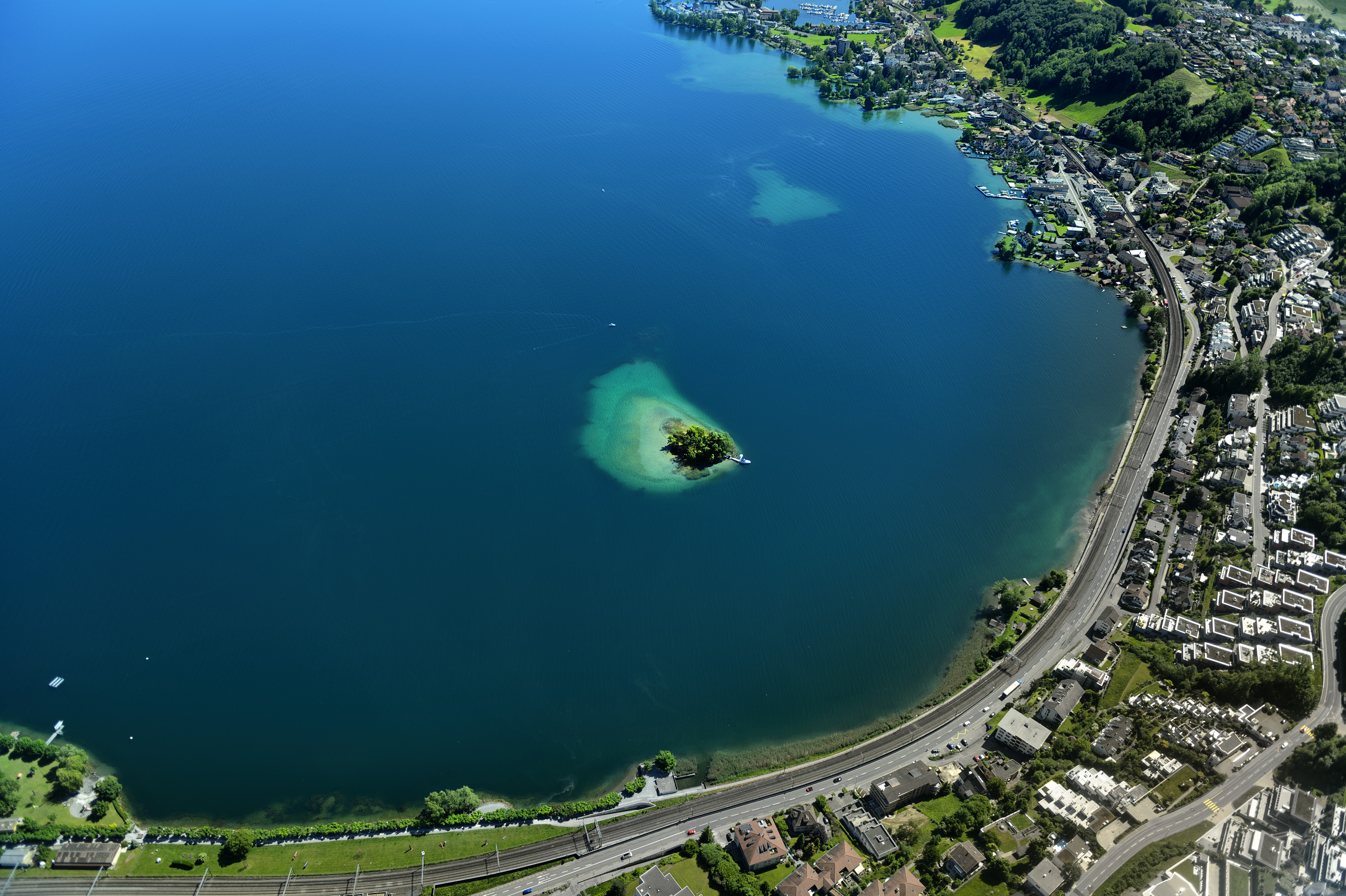
Schönenwerd island near Richterswil

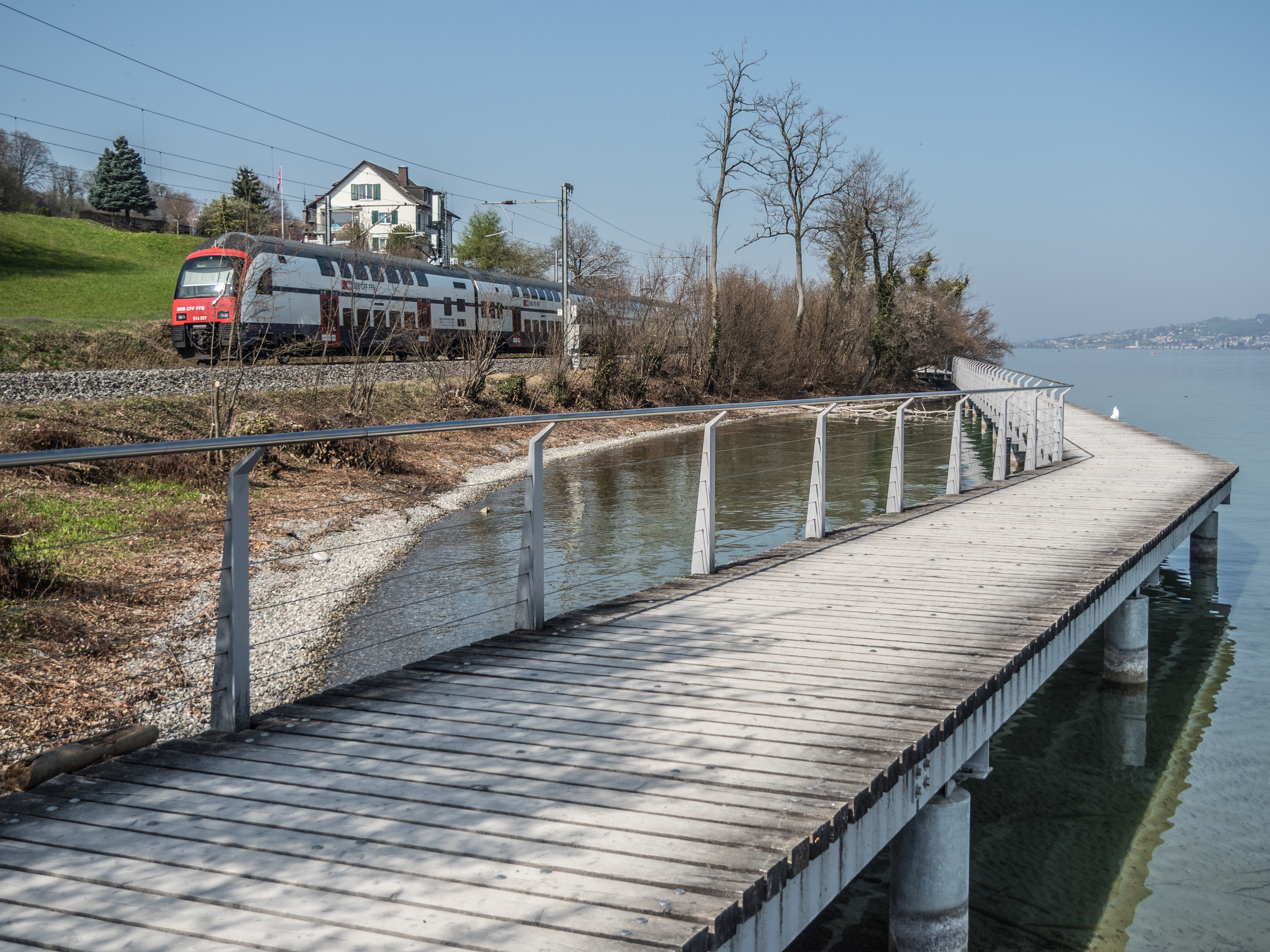
Bank path and pedestrian bridge near Richterswil

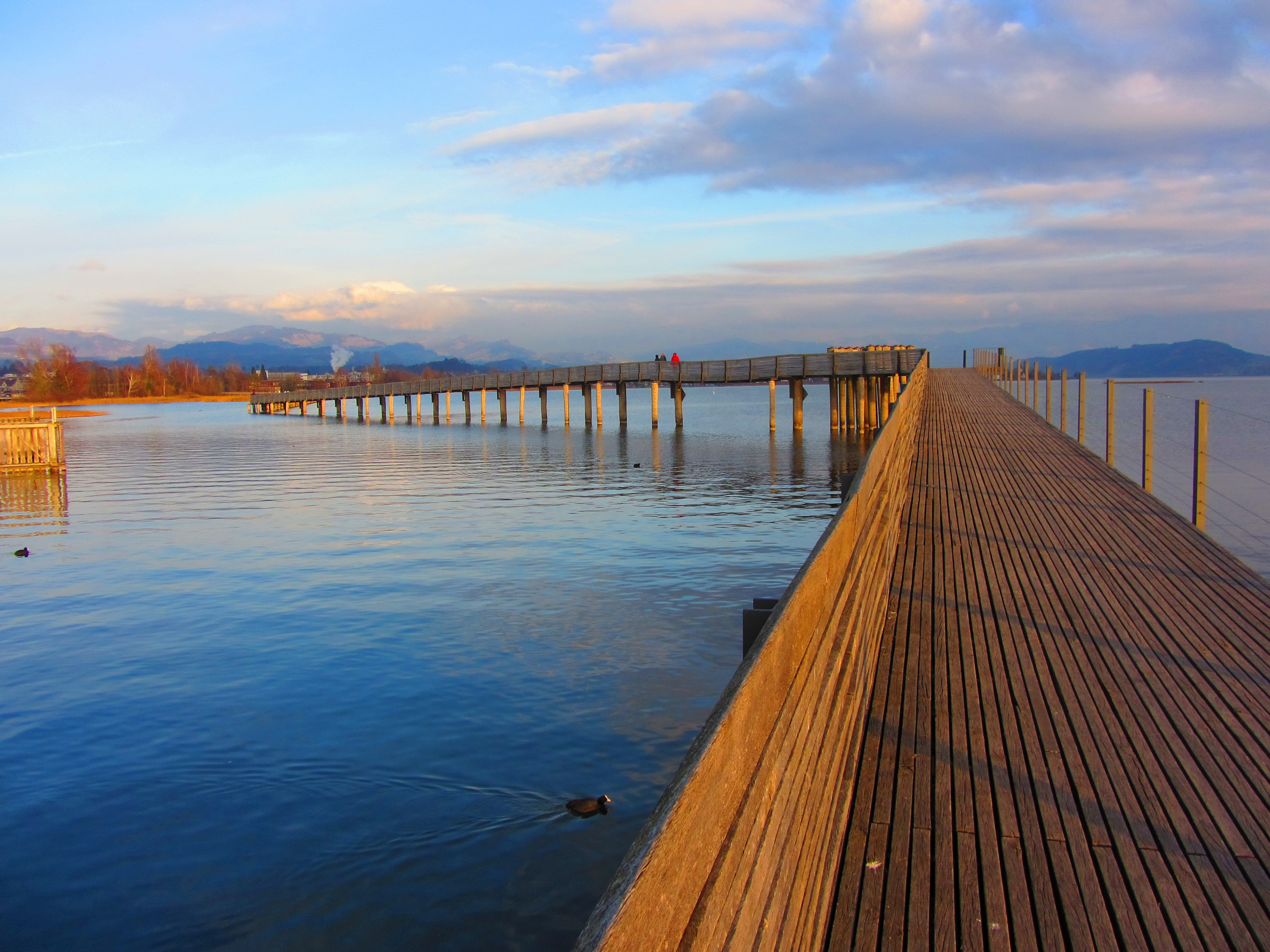
Wooden pedestrian bridge near Rapperswil

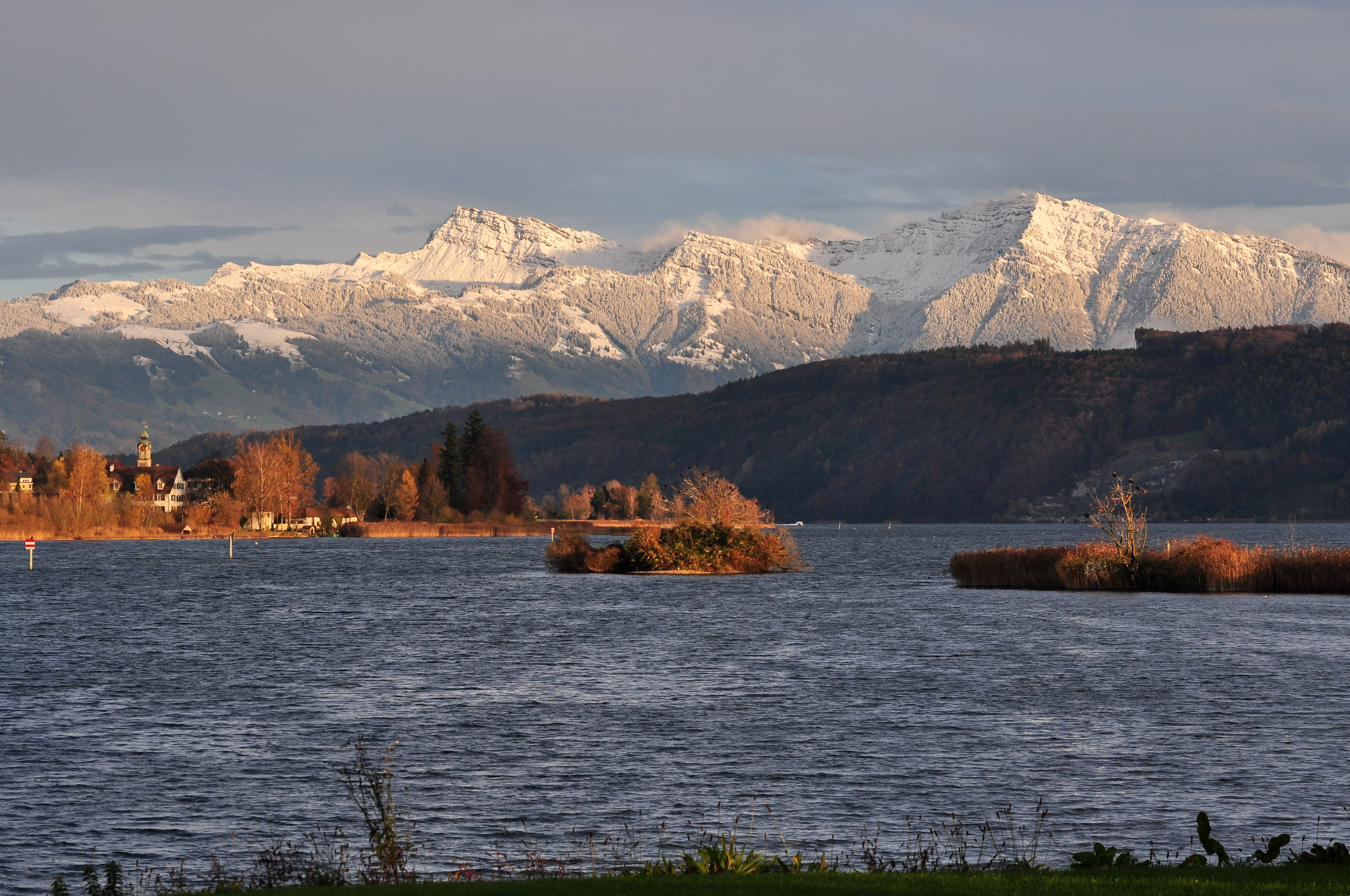
Small islands near Jona delta

== See also ==
- Obersee (Lake Zurich)
- Prehistoric pile dwellings around Lake Zurich
- Paddle steamer Stadt Rapperswil
- Paddle steamer Stadt Zürich
- Radio Zürisee
- Seedamm
- Zürichsee-Zeitung
- List of lakes of Switzerland
