= E2A Architects =

E2A Architects is an architecture firm based in Zürich, Switzerland. The office is led by Piet Eckert (*1968, Mumbai) and Wim Eckert (*1969, Zürich) who founded E2A Architects in 2001.

== Overview ==
The brothers Piet Eckert and Wim Eckert both graduated from the ETH Zurich in 1994 and 1995. After their studies they joined OMA, working from 1995 to 1997 in Rotterdam, Los Angeles and Seoul. In 2001 Piet and Wim established E2A Architects. They have taught at several schools and universities in Europe and have been Visiting Professors at the Academy of Architecture in Mendrisio since 2014. Their work has been widely published, including the comprehensive monograph E2A in 2011 with Hatje Cantz, Silent Form in 2014 with Park Books, and more recently the new monograph by 2G Magazine of Gustavo Gili Editors.

== Selected projects ==
=== Current and completed projects ===
- Sportshall Wehntal, Niederweningen, 2019-2021
- Water Police Station, Zurich 2019-2021
- Hofacker School, Zurich, 2018-2022
- Apartment Building Geistlich, Schlieren, 2018-2020
- Taz Media Building, Berlin, 2015-2018
- Europaallee, Baufeld H, Zurich, 2014-2017
- Deaconry Bethanien, Zurich, 2012-2016
- Secondary School Campus Moos, Kilchberg-Rüschlikon, 2014-2016
- Single-Family House B., Staefa, 2013-2015
- Apartment Buildings Escherpark, Zurich, 2012-2015
- Escher Terraces - High-Rise Apartments and Rehearsal Stages, Zurich, 2011-2014
- Trafag Production Hall, Bubikon, 2010-2011
- Auditorium and Library, Staefa, 2009-2010
- Center for Hearing and Language, Zurich, 2007-2017
- Heinrich Böll Foundation, Berlin, 2007-2008
- Triangle House, Winterthur, 2007-2008
- Soccer Training Center and Sports Facilities Juchhof, Zurich, 2006-2007
- Terrace Housing, Meilen, 2004-2005
- Broëlberg Residences, Kilchberg, 2002-2003

== Exhibitions ==
=== Solo exhibitions ===
- Arranging Contradictions – Widersprüchliches ordnen, Exhibition at Munich Architecture Gallery, 2013
- Bodies and Layers, Exhibition at Aedes Architekturforum Berlin, 2012
- Bauten und Projekte, Exhibition at the Galerie Renate Kammer. Architektur und Kunst, Hamburg, 2011
- Serien 2004-09, Exhibition at Architecture Gallery am Weissenhof, Stuttgart, 2010
- Modelle, Exhibition at the Architecture Gallery Luzern, 2010
- Fractions of Reality, Solo presentation within 4th Belgrade International Architecture Week – BINA09, Cultural Centre of Belgrade, Belgrad, Serbia, 2009
- Der ideale Kontext, Exhibition at the Architektur Galerie Berlin, 2008

== Publications ==
- E2A Architects, Logic and Desire, AV Proyectos 87, Madrid 2018
- Verborgene Vielfalt, Diakonie Bethanien, werk, bauen + wohnen, Zürich 2017
- E2A, Indexpaper Monograph, Indexnewspaper, Porto 2017
- E2A Progetti. Piet Eckert & Wim Eckert, Casa Editrice Libria, Melfi 2016
- E2A, Piet Eckert & Wim Eckert, 2G, Nr. 71, 2015
- Silent Form, E2A, Piet Eckert & Wim Eckert with Jon Naiman, Park Books, Zürich 2014
- E2A Architecture, Piet Eckert & Wim Eckert, Hatje Cantz Verlag, Ostfildern 2012
- E2A Eckert Eckert Architekten, De aedibus, Quart Verlag, Luzern 2006

== Awards ==
- D AM Preis für Architektur in Deutschland 2020, Finalist, taz Neubau, Berlin
- Verzinkerpreis 2019, Award, taz Neubau, Berlin
- American Architecture Prize 2016, Silver Award for Escherpark Housing Complex, Zurich Switzerland 2015, Silver Award for House B, Staefa, Switzerland 2015, Honorable Mention for Campus Moos, Rüschlikon, Switzerland 2016
- Fritz-Höger-Preis für Backstein-Architektur 2014, Silver Award for Escher Terraces high-rise apartments, Zurich, Switzerland 2014
- Best Architects 13 Award 2013, Auditorium and Library, Staefa, Switzerland 2012
- Deutsches Gütesiegel Nachhaltiges Bauen (DGNB), Gold Label for Baufeld H, Europaallee, Zurich, Switzerland 2012
- Green Good Design Award 2010, Heinrich Böll Stiftung, Berlin, Germany 2010
- Bund Deutscher Architekten (BDA) Award Berlin 2009, Honorable Mention for Heinrich Böll Stiftung, Berlin, Germany 2009
- Schweizer Solarpreis, Sportanlage Juchhof, Zurich, Switzerland 2008
- Best Architects 09 Award 2009, Triangel Haus, Winterthur, Switzerland 2008
