= Oxess =

Swiss manufacturer of snowboards and skis

Oxess GmbH
- Type: Private
- Industry: Sporting goods
- Founded: 1994
- Founder: Marcel Brunner
- Headquarters: Bubikon, Switzerland
- Products: Snowboards, skis
- Website: oxess.ch

Oxess GmbH is a Swiss manufacturer of snowboards and skis, headquartered in Bubikon, in the canton of Zurich, Switzerland. The company produces custom snow sports equipment for competitive and recreational use and exports to markets including the United States, Canada, France, Japan, South Korea, and China.

== History ==
Oxess GmbH was founded in 1994 in Bubikon, Switzerland, by Marcel Brunner, a trained cabinetmaker who had previously worked at the Sauber Formula One team gaining experience with carbon fibre and fibreglass composite materials. The name "Oxess" is dervied from the words "obsession" and "success". The company's first World Cup podium finish came in 2003, and its first world title in 2009. By 2019, athletes using Oxess equipment had won 18 Olympic medals across multiple Winter Games.

== Operations ==
Oxess is a privately held company with its design and manufacturing facilities in Bubikon. Each board is produced individually to rider specifications, with wood cores combined with composite materials including fibreglass and carbon fibre, and parameters such as flex and torsional stiffness adjusted for rider weight, stance, and discipline. The company produces a maximum of four snowboards per day and employs a small number of staff. The company collaborates with the IWK Institute of Materials Technology and Plastics Processing at HSR Technical University Rapperswil to measure and classify the torsional and bending properties of its equipment. In partnership with the Ithaka Institute for Carbon Strategies, Oxess developed a construction method known as Global C-Sink, which integrates biochar-derived carbon materials into snowboard constructions to reduce vibration and improve energy recovery.

== Use in competitive sports ==
Oxess equipment has been used by athletes in FIS Snowboard World Cup competitions and Winter Olympic Games across disciplines including snowboard cross, parallel giant slalom, and parallel slalom. In the 2014–15 season, approximately 60 percent of women and 40 percent of men competing in World Cup snowboard cross events used Oxess equipment. In 2017, Oxess was visited by Gou Zhongwen, the director of the General Administration of Sport of China, and won a contract to supply the Chinese national snowboard team until 2022. Swiss snowboarder Nevin Galmarini won the gold medal in the parallel giant slalom at the 2018 Winter Olympics on an Oxess snowboard. At the 2022 Winter Olympics in Beijing, athletes on Oxess equipment won nine medals across snowboard and freestyle skiing disciplines. Austrian snowboarder Markus Schairer won the snowboard cross world title in 2009 on Oxess equipment.

== See also ==
- Snowboard cross
- Parallel giant slalom
- FIS Snowboard World Cup
