= Ghöch Pass =

Mountain pass in Switzerland

- Location within Canton of Zürich Location within Switzerland Location within Alps
- Interactive map of Ghöch Pass
- Elevation: 962 metres (3,156 ft)

Third Approach
- Location: Switzerland
- Coordinates: 47°19′53″N 8°54′08″E

Ghöch Pass is a mountain pass in the canton of Zürich in Switzerland.
