= List of Swiss cantons by GRDP =

This article is about the gross regional domestic product (GRDP) of Swiss cantons in main fiscal years. All figures are from the Federal Statistical Office of Switzerland.

== By GRDP ==
Cantons according to their gross regional domestic product in 2022 in Swiss francs.

Rank	Canton	GRDP in (billions of CHF)
1	Zürich	164.495
2	Bern	89.362
3	Vaud	64.500
4	Geneva	61.231
5	Aargau	47.538
6	St. Gallen	44.589
7	Basel-Stadt	41.203
8	Ticino	36.084
9	Lucerne	31.924
10	Basel-Landschaft	22.812
11	Zug	25.176
12	Valais	21.807
13	Fribourg	21.424
14	Solothurn	20.763
15	Thurgau	20.292
16	Neuchâtel	18.724
17	Grisons	16.726
18	Schwyz	11.623
19	Schaffhausen	8.542
20	Jura	5.799
21	Appenzell Ausserrhoden	3.749
22	Nidwalden	3.310
23	Glarus	3.118
24	Obwalden	2.889
25	Uri	2.171
26	Appenzell Innerrhoden	1.238
	Switzerland	791.087

== By GDP per capita ==
Cantons according to their gross regional domestic product per capita in 2022 in Swiss francs.

Rank	Canton	GRDP per capita (in CHF)
1	Basel-Stadt	209,782
2	Zug	192,958
3	Geneva	119,644
4	Neuchâtel	106,165
5	Zürich	104,620
6	Ticino	102,190
7	Schaffhausen	100,959
8	St. Gallen	85,320
9	Bern	85,151
10	Grisons	82,817
11	Jura	78,546
12	Vaud	78,021
13	Basel-Landschaft	77,693
14	Lucerne	75,544
15	Appenzell Innerrhoden	75,526
16	Glarus	75,430
17	Nidwalden	74,952
18	Obwalden	74,902
19	Solothurn	73,803
20	Schwyz	70,739
21	Thurgau	70,504
22	Appenzell Ausserrhoden	67,341
23	Aargau	67,224
24	Fribourg	64,502
25	Valais	61,387
26	Uri	58,392
	Switzerland	90,131
