= Egelsee (Bubikon) =

Lake in the canton of Zurich, Switzerland

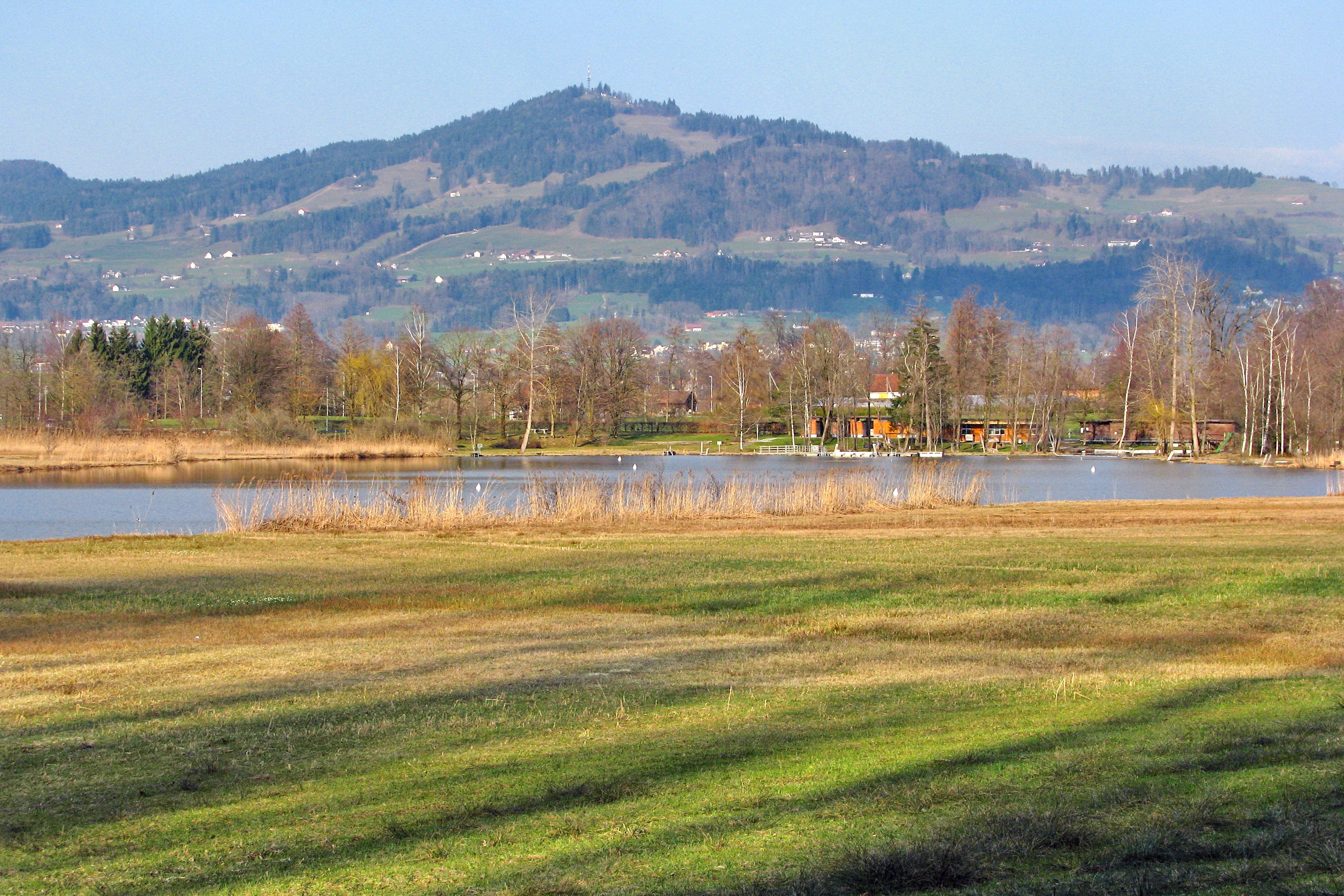
- Egelsee (March 2010)

- Location within Canton of Zurich Location within Canton of St. Gallen Location within Switzerland Location within Alps
- Interactive map of Egelsee
- Location: Bubikon, Canton of Zurich
- Coordinates: 47°15′28″N 8°49′00″E
- Primary outflows: Rüegghuserbach
- Catchment area: 1.305 km^{2} (0.504 sq mi)
- Basin countries: Switzerland
- Surface area: 4.3 ha (11 acres)
- Average depth: 3.6 m (12 ft)
- Max. depth: 6 m (20 ft)
- Residence time: 180 days
- Surface elevation: 494 m (1,621 ft)

Egelsee is a lake in the municipality of Bubikon in the Canton of Zurich, Switzerland. Its surface area is 4.3 ha (11 acres).

== Geography ==
During the Würm glaciation around 12,000 years ago, the Rhine/Linth Glacier shaped the landscape in the Zurich Oberland. A tributary crept up from Lake Zurich into the upper Glatt valley. When it melted back, it left behind many troughs with numerous small lakes, so-called dead lakes. Many of these lakes silted up, only a few remained, one of which is the Egelsee. Its surface originally measured 650,000 m^{2} and today its size has shrunk to just 35,000 m^{2}.

In 1991, the lake and the surrounding bog were included in the list of raised and transitional bogs of national importance and in 1994 it was included in the list of fens of national importance.
