= Schufelberger Egg Pass =

Mountain pass in Zurich, Switzerland

- Location within Canton of Zürich Location within Switzerland Location within Alps
- Interactive map of Schufelberger Egg Pass
- Elevation: 990 metres (3,250 ft)

Third Approach
- Location: Switzerland
- Range: Alps
- Coordinates: 47°18′13″N 8°53′13″E

Schufelberger Egg Pass (el. 990 m.) is a mountain pass in the Alps in the canton of Zürich in Switzerland.

It connects Wernetshausen (in the municipality of Hinwil) and Gibswil (in the municipality of Fischenthal).

== See also ==
- List of highest paved roads in Europe
- List of mountain passes
