= Trafag AG =

Swiss electronics manufacturing company

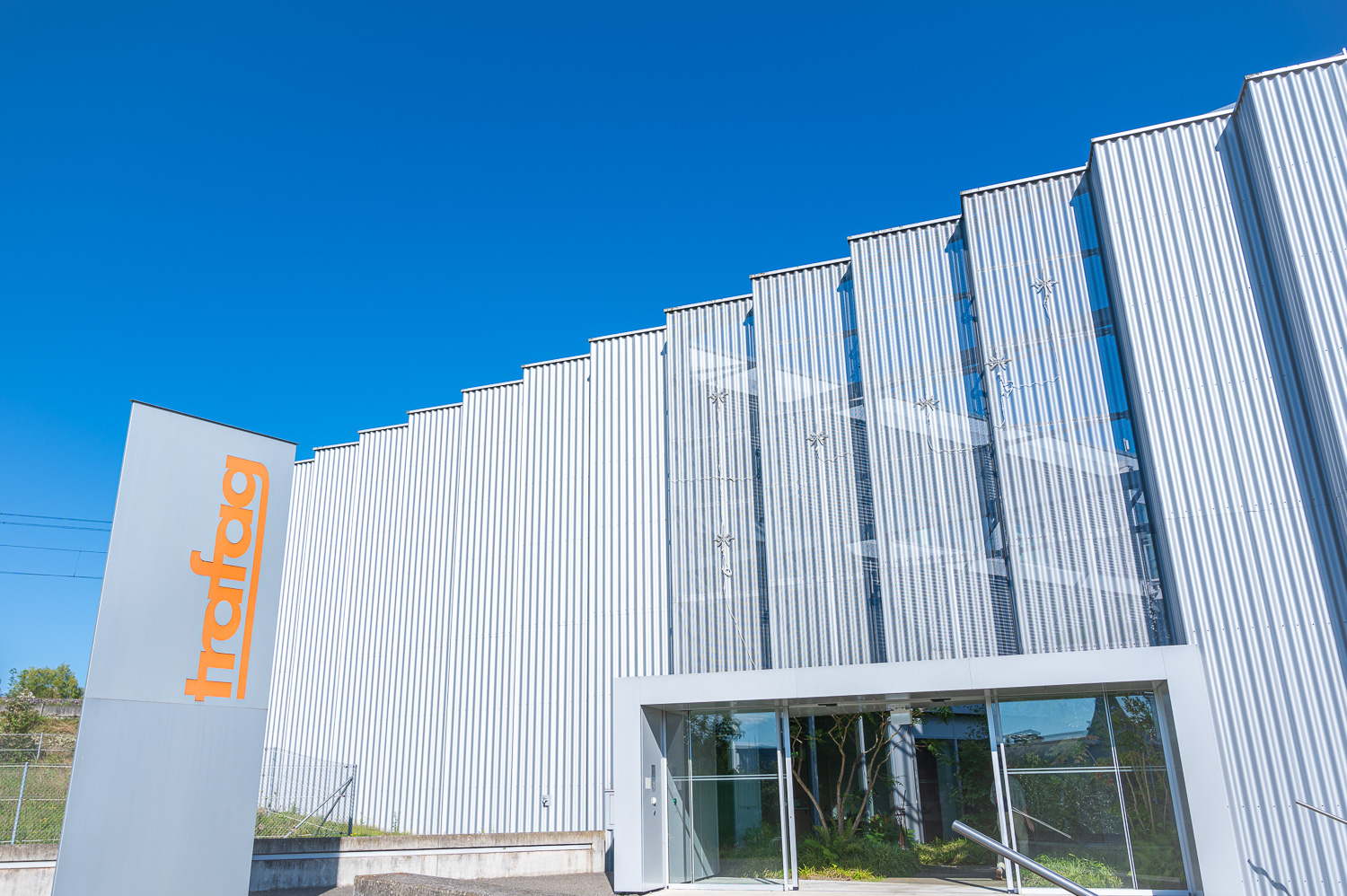
- Trafag's headquarters
- Industry: Electronics manufacturing
- Founded: 1942
- Founder: Oscar Pfrunder
- Headquarters: Bubikon, Switzerland
- Website: www.trafag.com

Trafag AG is an electronics manufacturing company founded in 1942 in Switzerland. The company develops, produces, and sells sensors and monitoring devices for pressure, temperature, and gas density internationally. Trafag is headquartered in Bubikon, Zürich, Switzerland.

== History ==
Trafag AG was founded in 1942 in Männedorf, Switzerland by Oscar Pfrunder. The founder was the owner of an office for technical lighting and wanted to sell more of the innovative 24-volt light bulbs. However, there was a lack of available transformers. For this reason, he purchased a small transformer factory in La Neuveville. In 1947, Oscar Pfrunder‘s father, Karl Heinrich Pfrunder, gave his son Oscar space for the production of ballasts. In 1956, Gaston Bloch, the stepson of Oscar Pfrunder, also joined the company. In addition to transformers, thermostats are now also manufactured. The next year, in 1967, the turnover of the transformer department reached the 1-million CHF mark for the first time.

In the 1960s, Trafag AG began a partnership with Motoco that evolved into penetrating international markets and a subsidiary in Germany. During the 1970s, the business strategy focused increasingly on measurement and control technology, for temperature and pressure. The production of transformers was stopped. The first subsidiary was founded in Vienna, Austria in 1971 andI and in 1978, Gaston Bloch took over the management of the company.

In 1984, Robert Pfrunder, grandson of Karl Heinrich Pfrunder, joined the company and became CEO in 1990. In 1995, Trafag opened its first international subsidiary in Poland and has since expanded its international presence with subsidiaries in France, UK, Germany, Czech Republic, India, the United States, Italy, Japan, and Spain.

In the late 1990s, Trafag began to focus on the development of products in the area of industrial process measurement and control. The company developed the SF6 gas density monitors and gas density sensors with a patented measurement principle using a quartz vibrating fork.

The company consolidated its operations to a single site in Männedorf in 2001. In 2008, the entire thermostat production was relocated to the subsidiary in the Czech Republic. In 2019, Trafag AG established Magnetic Sense in Unterensingen, Germany, to cooperate with a broader range of applications within industrial sectors needing sensor measurement technology. In 2018, Dieter Zeisel, former head of research and development, became CEO of Trafag.

== Products and technology ==
Trafag's products are used in the shipbuilding industry, hydraulics, railway, large engines, hydrogen, hazardous areas (EX), test and measurement, HVAC, and medium- and high-voltage switchgear industry.

The company has developed several patented products and technologies, including a pressure switch with a built-in digital display, a pressure switch that is suitable for use in hazardous areas, and a pressure transmitter that is able to measure up to 2500 bar.

The company is ISO 9001 and ISO 14001 certified.
