= Bubikon =

- Municipality
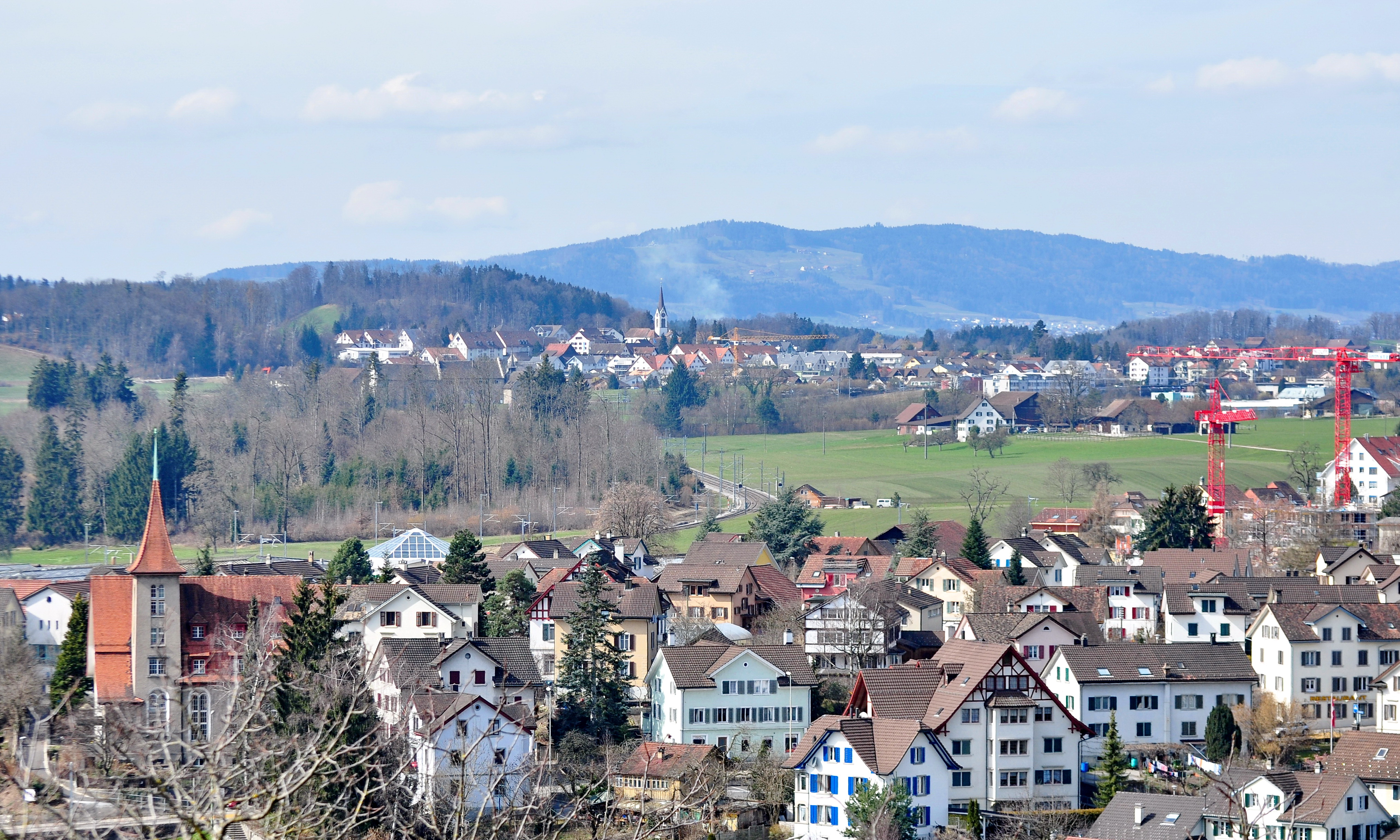

- Flag Coat of arms
- Location of Bubikon
- Location within Switzerland Location within Canton of Zurich
- Coordinates: 47°16′N 8°49′E
- Country: Switzerland
- Canton: Zurich
- District: Hinwil

Area
  - Total: 11.58 km^{2} (4.47 sq mi)
- Elevation: 509 m (1,670 ft)

Population (December 2020)
  - Total: 7,371
  - Density: 636.5/km^{2} (1,649/sq mi)
- Time zone: UTC+01:00 (CET)
  - Summer (DST): UTC+02:00 (CEST)
- Postal code: 8608
- SFOS number: 112
- ISO 3166 code: CH-ZH
- Surrounded by: Dürnten, Gossau, Grüningen, Hinwil, Hombrechtikon, Jona (SG), Rüti
- Website: www.bubikon.ch

Bubikon is a municipality in the district of Hinwil in the canton of Zürich in Switzerland.

== History ==
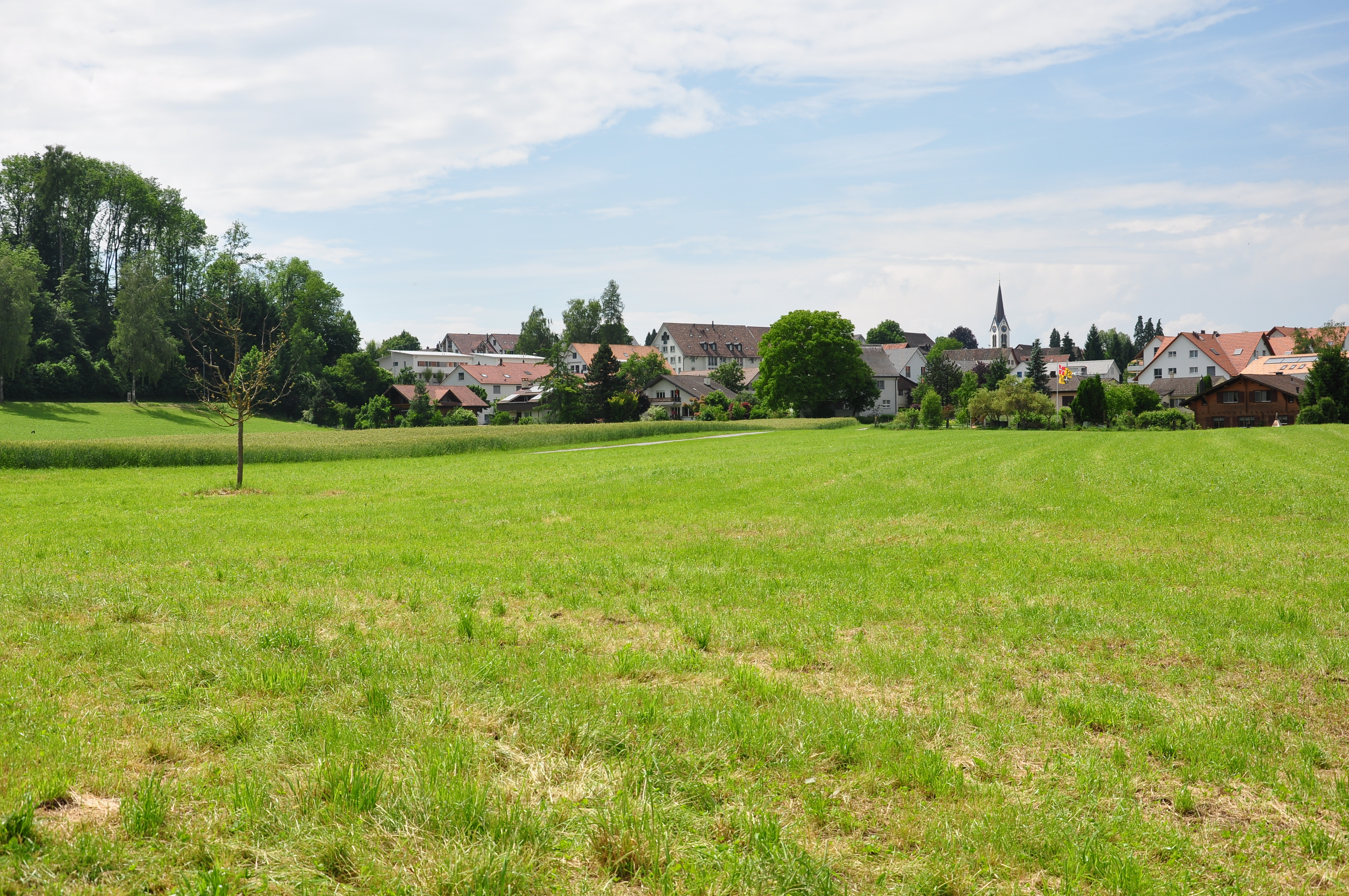
Bubikon as seen from the east

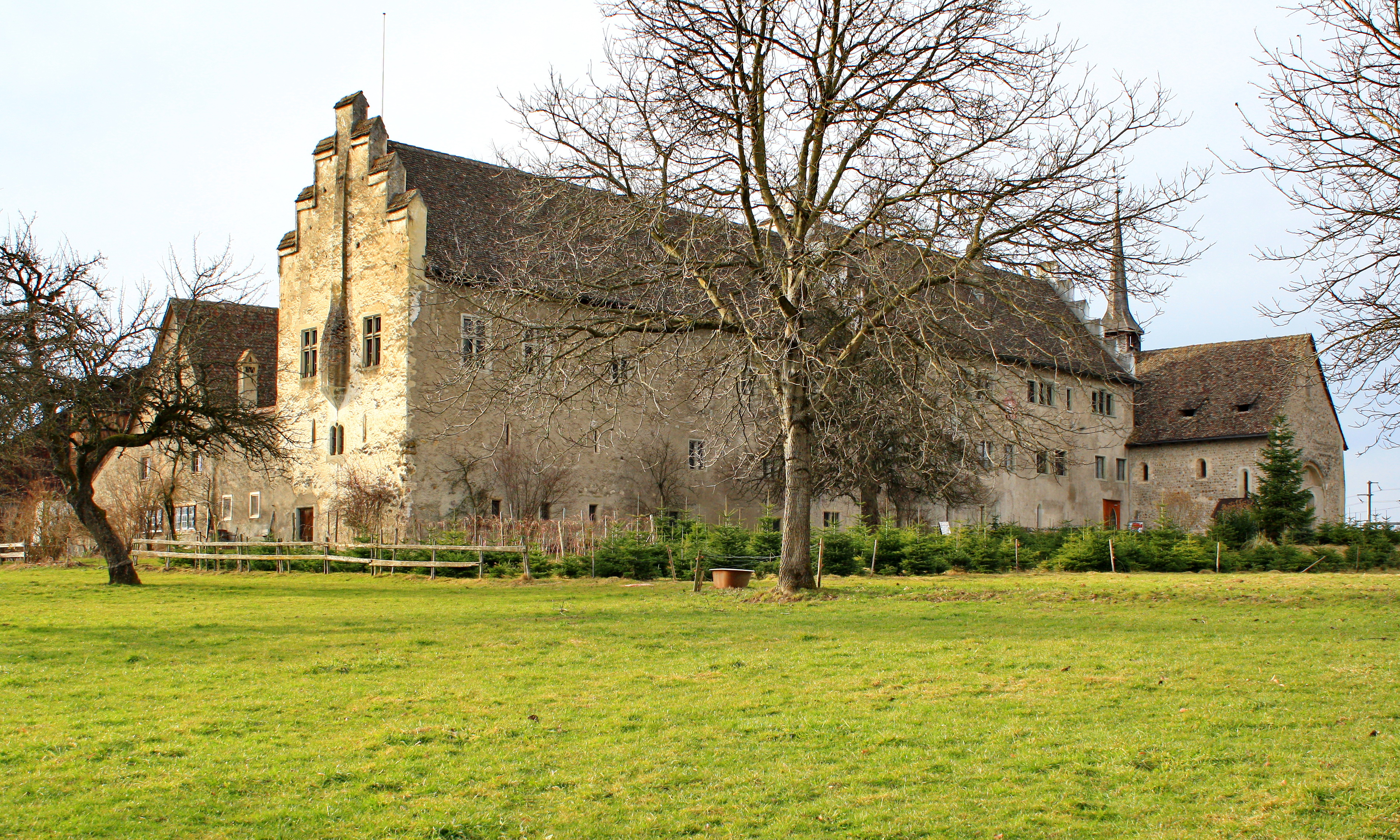
Ritterhaus Bubikon, a former Knights Hospitaller commandry

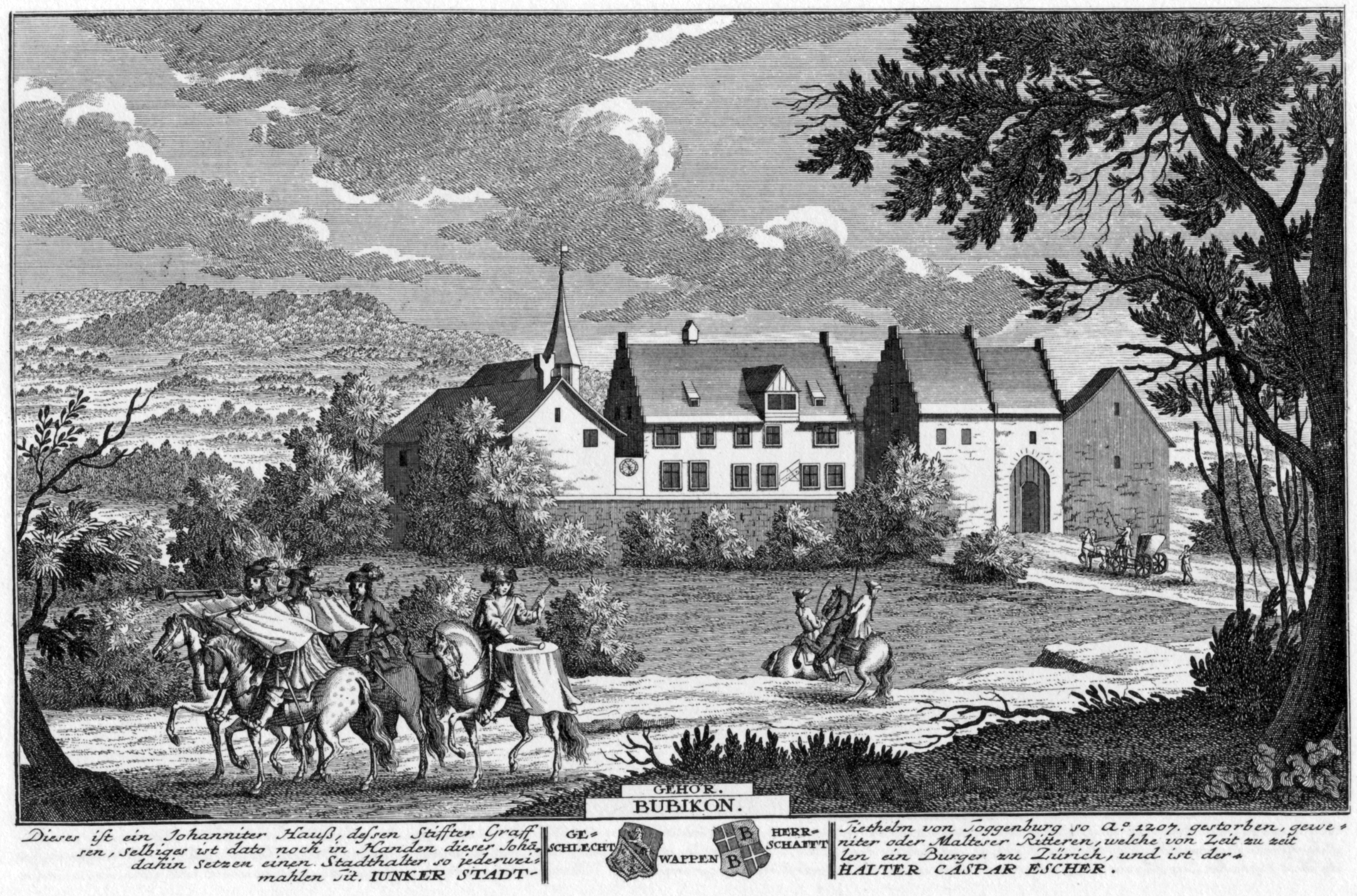
Bubikon commandry in 1742, drawing by David Herrliberger

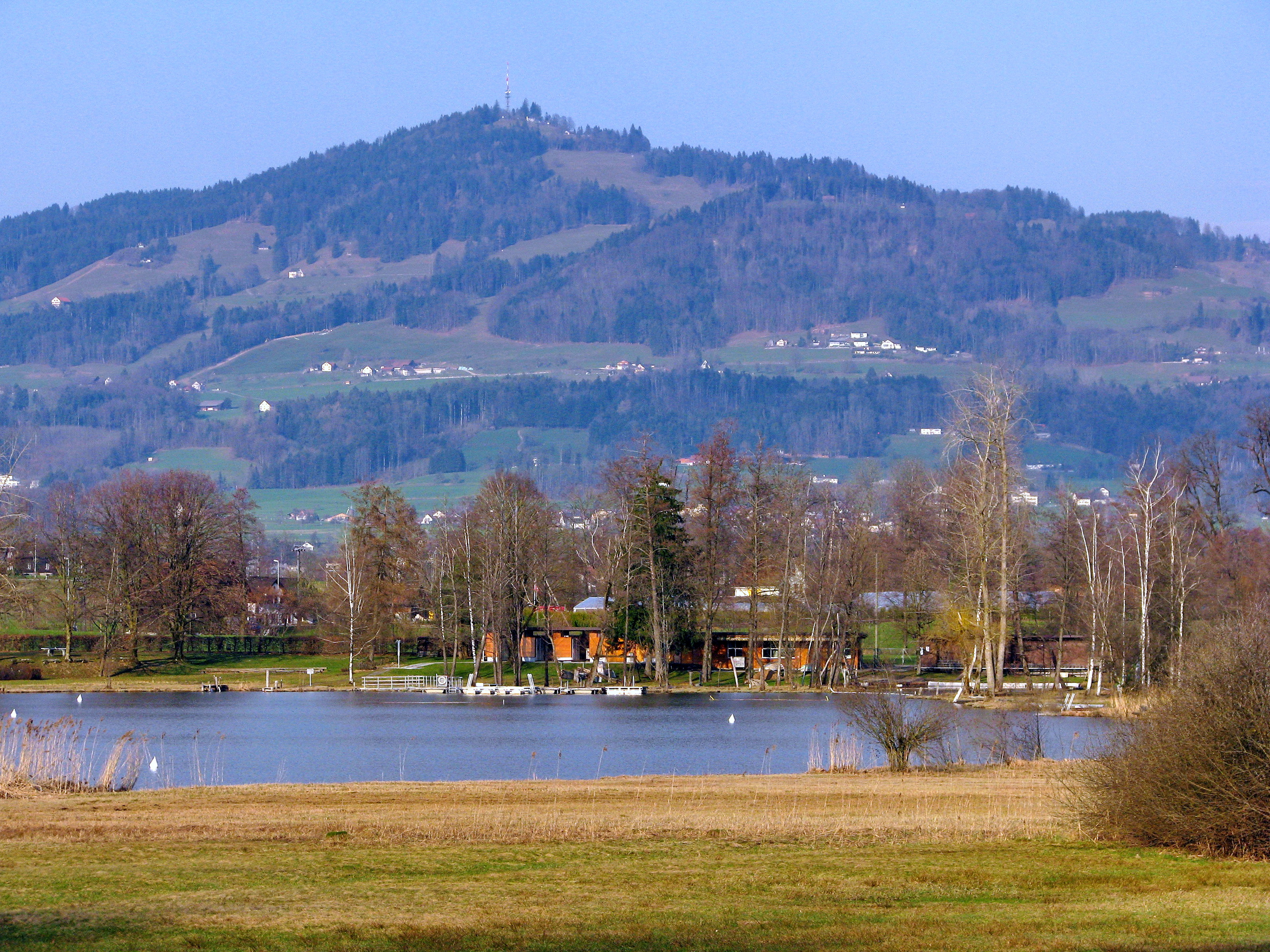
Egelsee lake, Bachtel in the background

Aerial view from 500 m by Walter Mittelholzer (1922)

Some names of localities have Celtic (Mürg) origins, others (Tafleten, Kammern, Zell) may have Roman origins. Fiefs of the St. Gallen Abbey are first mentioned around 744 in Berlikon (Perolvinchova), Bubikon is first mentioned in 811 as Puapinchova. The Ritterhaus Bubikon, a Knights Hospitaller commandry, was given by the Counts of Toggenburg and Counts of Rapperswil between 1191 and 1198. The convent was secularized in 1528, and the commandry in 1798.

== Geography ==
Bubikon has an area of 11.6 km^{2} (4.5 sq mi). Of this area, 62.4% is used for agricultural purposes, 13.2% is forested, 19.2% is settled (buildings or roads) and the remainder (5.2%) is non-productive (rivers, glaciers or mountains). In 1996 housing and buildings made up 12.4% of the total area, while transportation infrastructure made up the rest (6.6%). Of the total unproductive area, water (streams and lakes) made up 0.8% of the area. As of 2007 17.2% of the total municipal area was undergoing some type of construction.

The municipality is located in the upper Glatt Valley on the water divide between the Glatt river and Lake Zurich. It includes the villages of Bubikon and Wolfhausen as well as the hamlets of Barenberg, Berlikon, Bürg and Wändhüslen.

The Egelsee lake is located in the municipality.

== Demographics ==
Bubikon has a population (as of 31 December 2020) of 7,371. As of 2007, 8.7% of the population was made up of foreign nationals. As of 2008 the gender distribution of the population was 49.5% male and 50.5% female. Over the last 10 years the population has grown at a rate of 17.7%. Most of the population (as of 2000) speaks German (93.6%), with Italian being second most common ( 2.1%) and Albanian being third ( 0.9%).

In the 2007 election the most popular party was the SVP which received 37.7% of the vote. The next three most popular parties were the SPS (15.6%), the CSP (12%) and the Green Party (10%).

The age distribution of the population (as of 2000) is 25% children and teenagers (0–19 years old), whereas adults (20–64 years old) make up 62.6% and seniors (over 64 years old) make up 12.4%. The entire Swiss population is generally well educated. In Bubikon about 80.7% of the population (between age 25-64) have completed either non-mandatory upper secondary education or additional higher education (either university or a Fachhochschule). There are 2125 households in Bubikon.

Bubikon has an unemployment rate of 1.15%. As of 2005, there were 145 people employed in the primary economic sector and about 50 businesses involved in this sector. 1,031 people are employed in the secondary sector and there were 84 businesses in this sector. 1,274 people are employed in the tertiary sector, with 203 businesses in this sector. As of 2007 46.1% of the working population were employed full-time, and 53.9% were employed part-time.

As of 2008 there were 1,666 Catholics and 3,044 Protestants in Bubikon. In the 2000 census, religion was broken down into several smaller categories. From the 2000 census, 57% were some type of Protestant, with 50.3% belonging to the Swiss Reformed Church and 6.7% belonging to other Protestant churches. 26.3% of the population were Catholic. Of the rest of the population 3.1% belonged to another religion (not listed), 2.7% did not give a religion, and 10.5% were atheist or agnostic.

The historical population is given in the following table:

year	population
1634	262
1850	1,591
1870	1,489
1900	1,555
1920	1,809
1950	2,265
1970	3,244
2000	5,424

== Transport ==
Bubikon railway station is a stop of the Zürich S-Bahn on the lines S15 and S5. Its train station is a 25-minute (S5) ride from Zürich Hauptbahnhof.

== Gallery ==
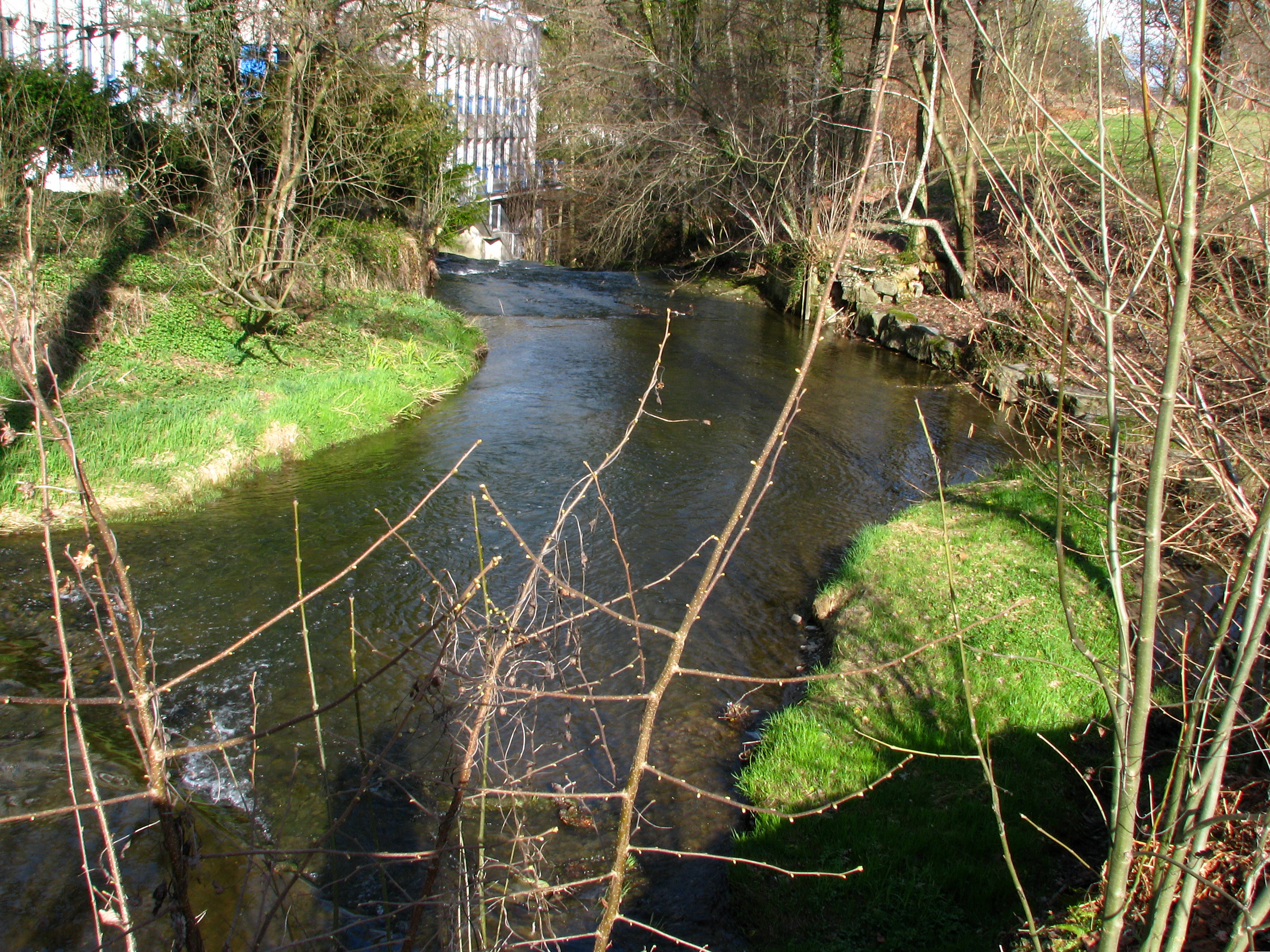
Schwarz river in Bubikon, Schwarztöbeli waterfall in the background

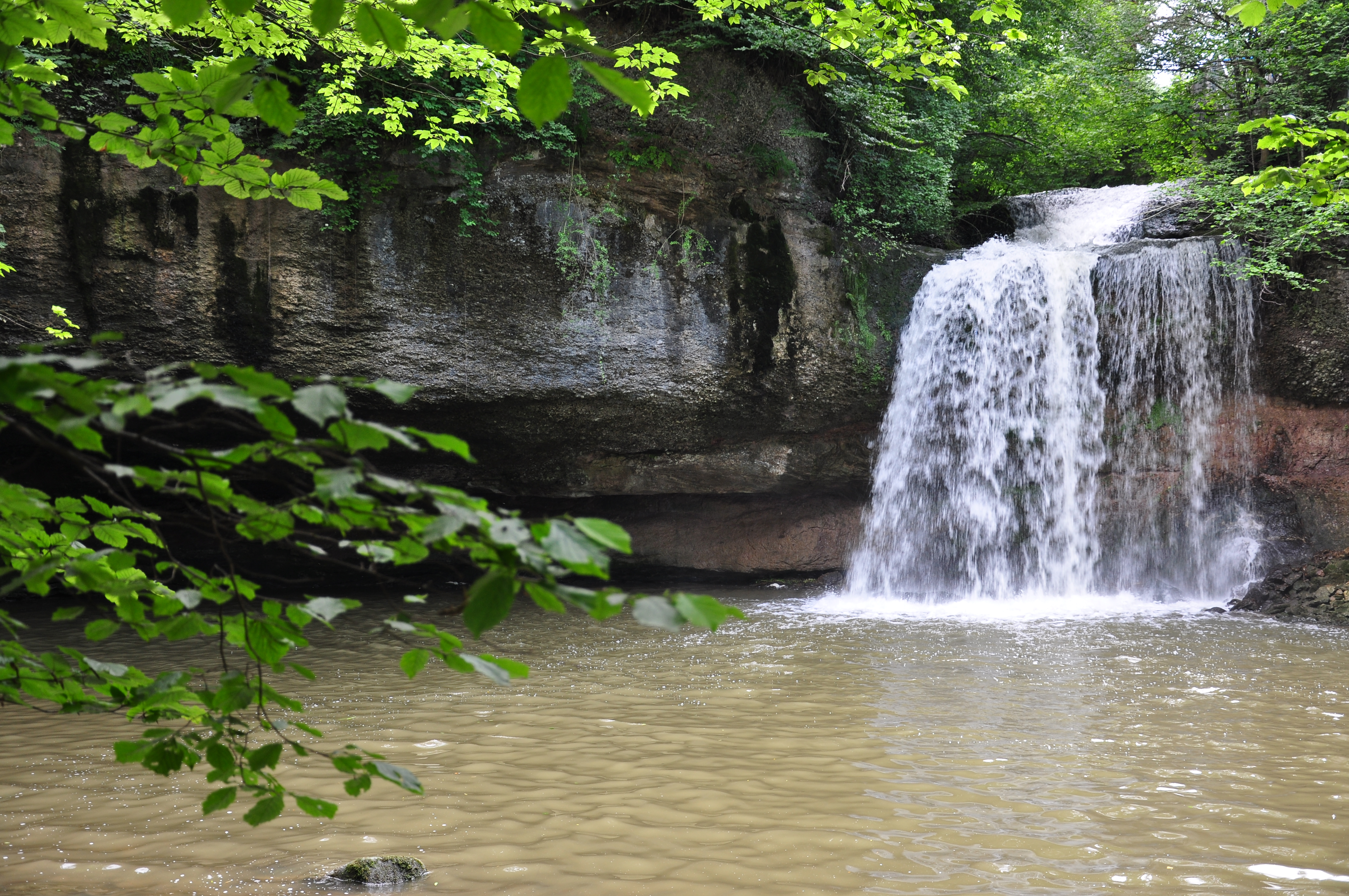
Schwarztöbeli valley between Bubikon and Rüti

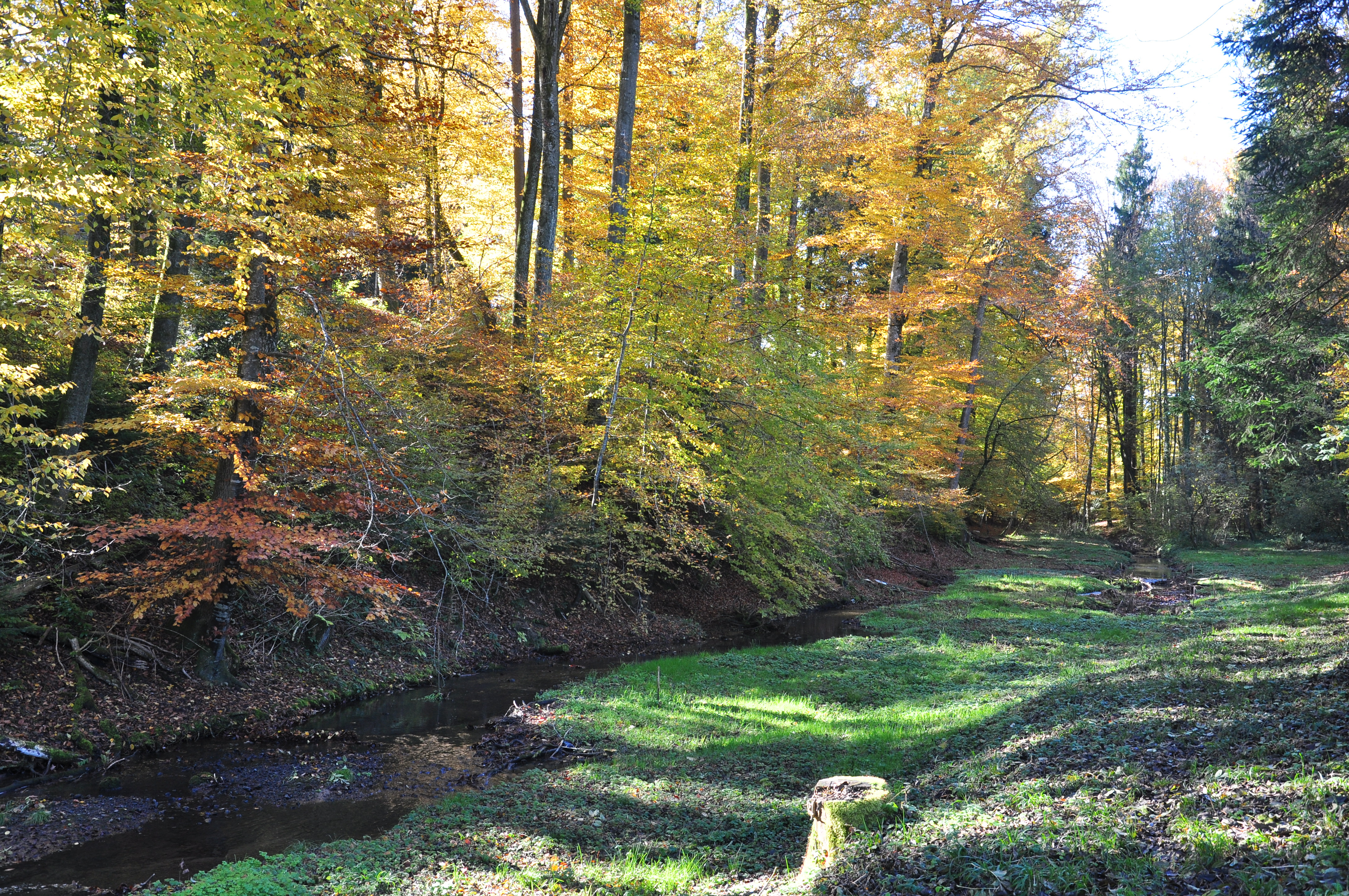
Giessenbach valley and stream

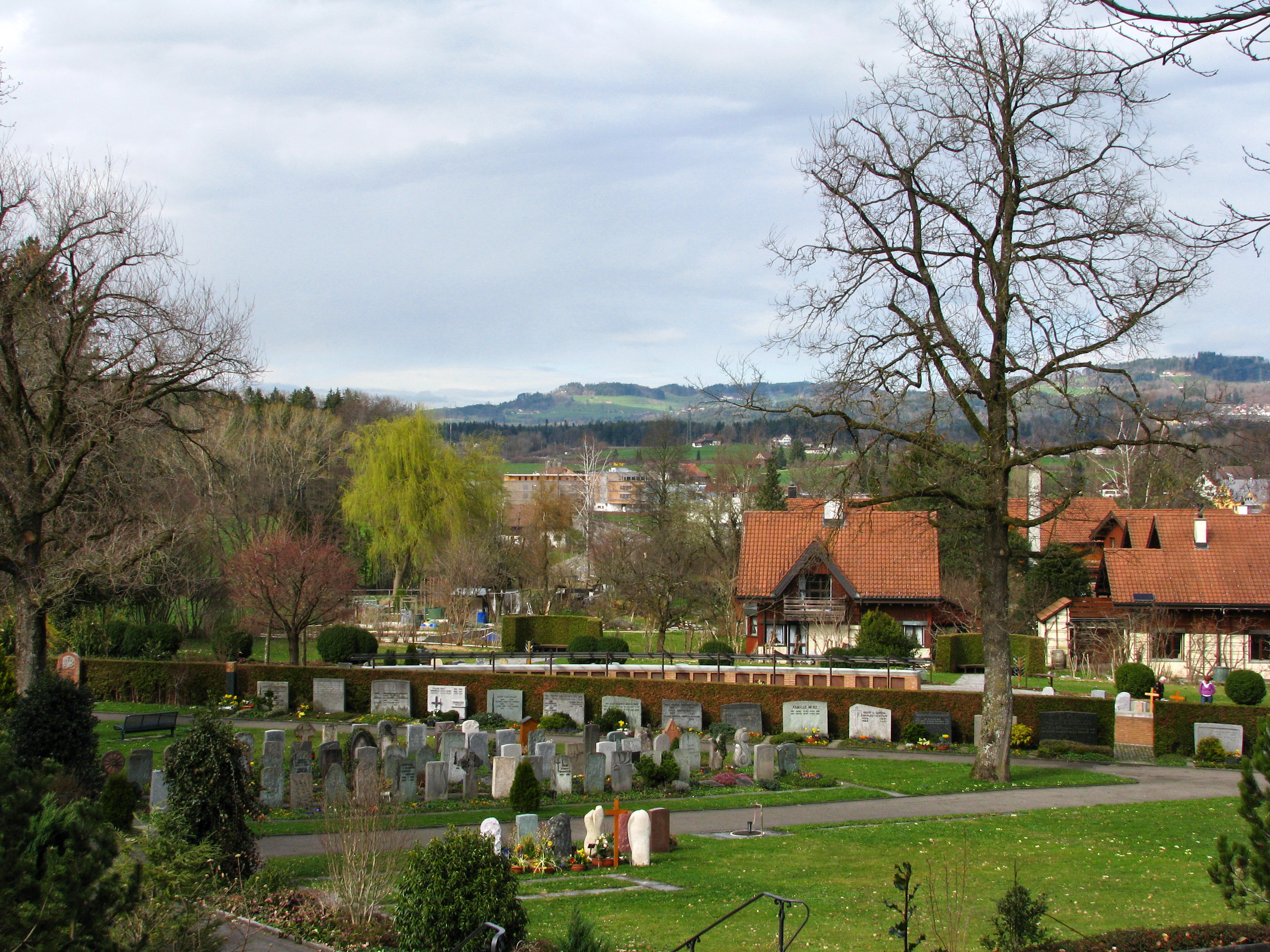
Bubikon as seen from the cemetery at the Reformed church

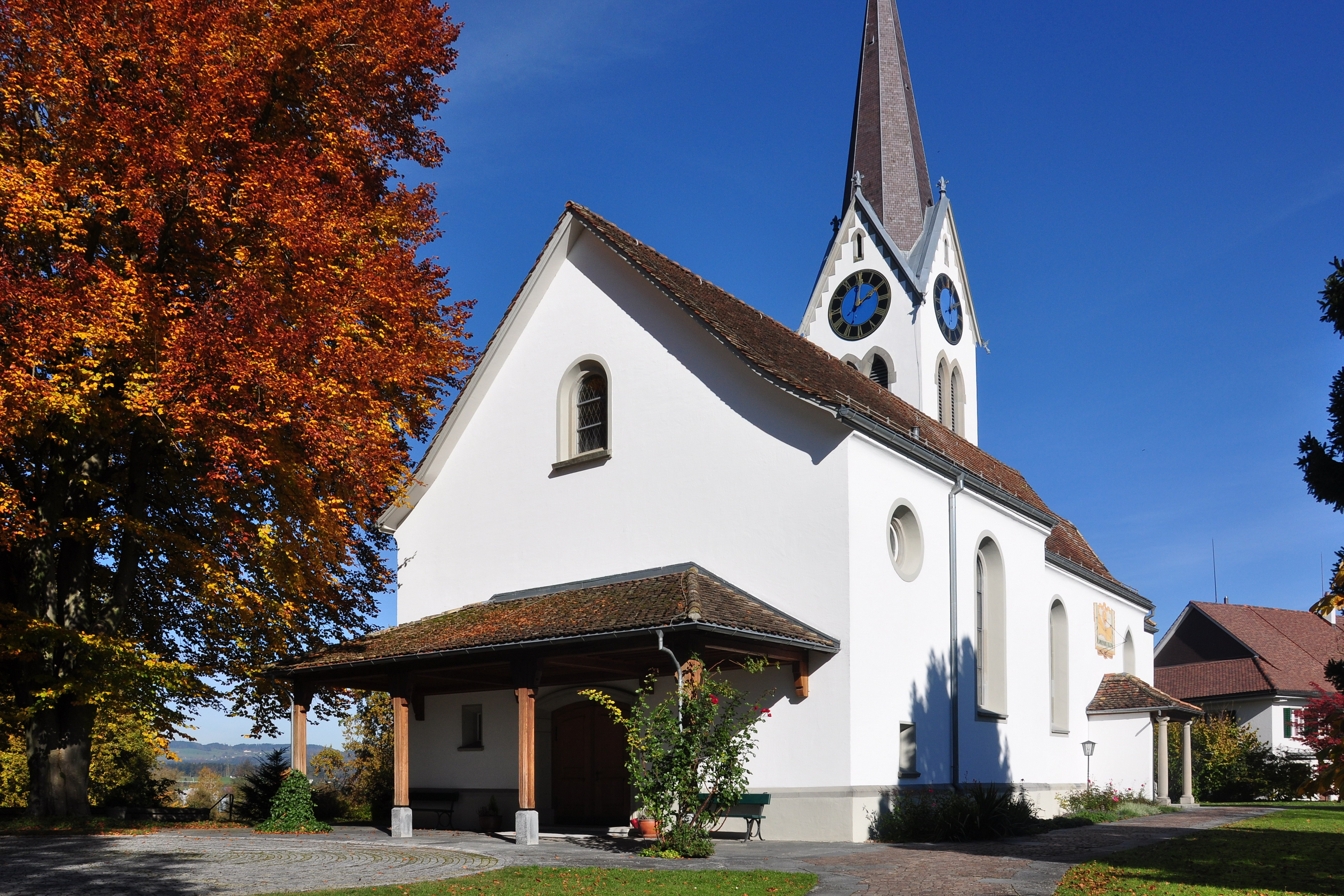
Reformed church (built around 1192 AD)

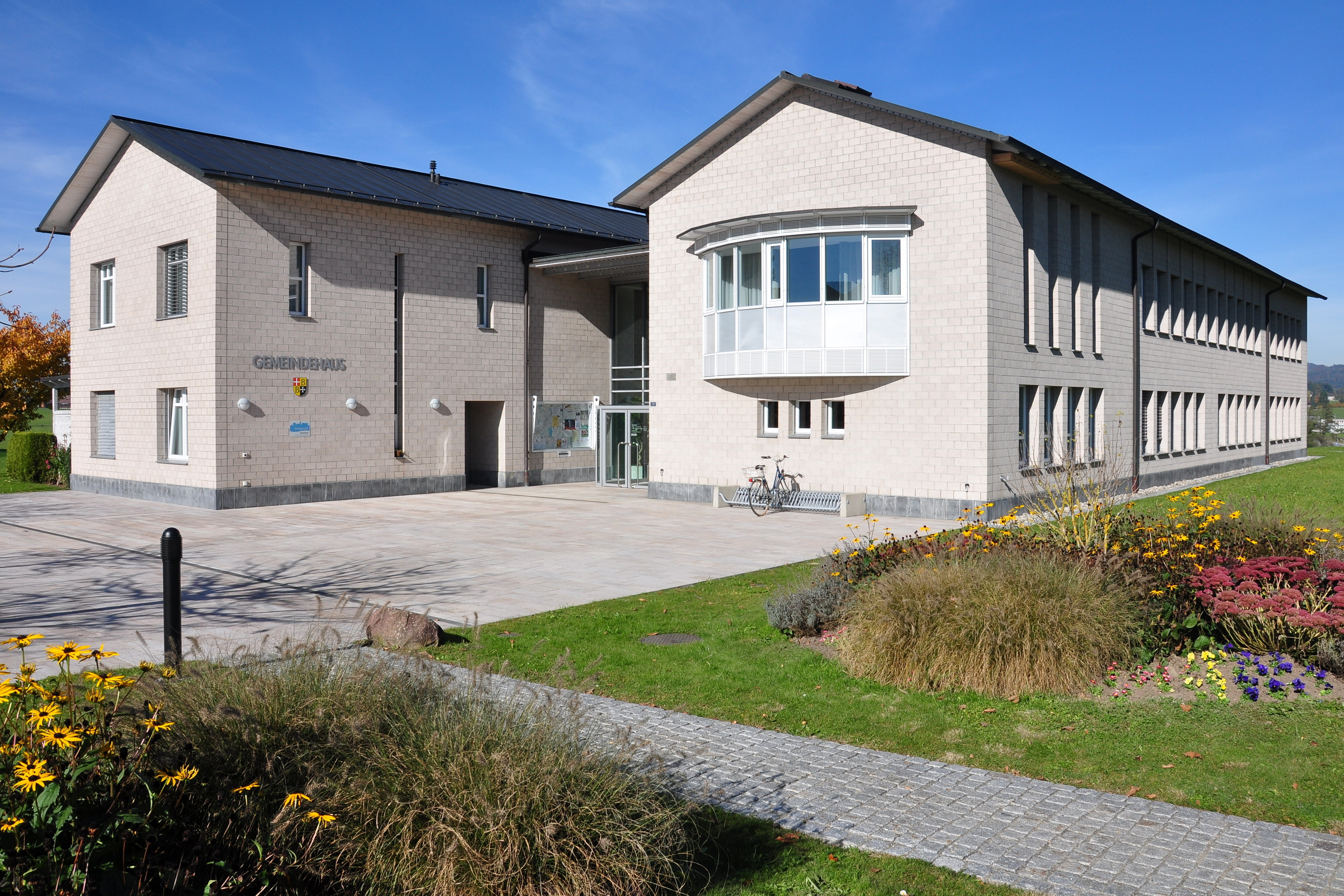
Gemeindehaus (town hall) nearby Reformed church

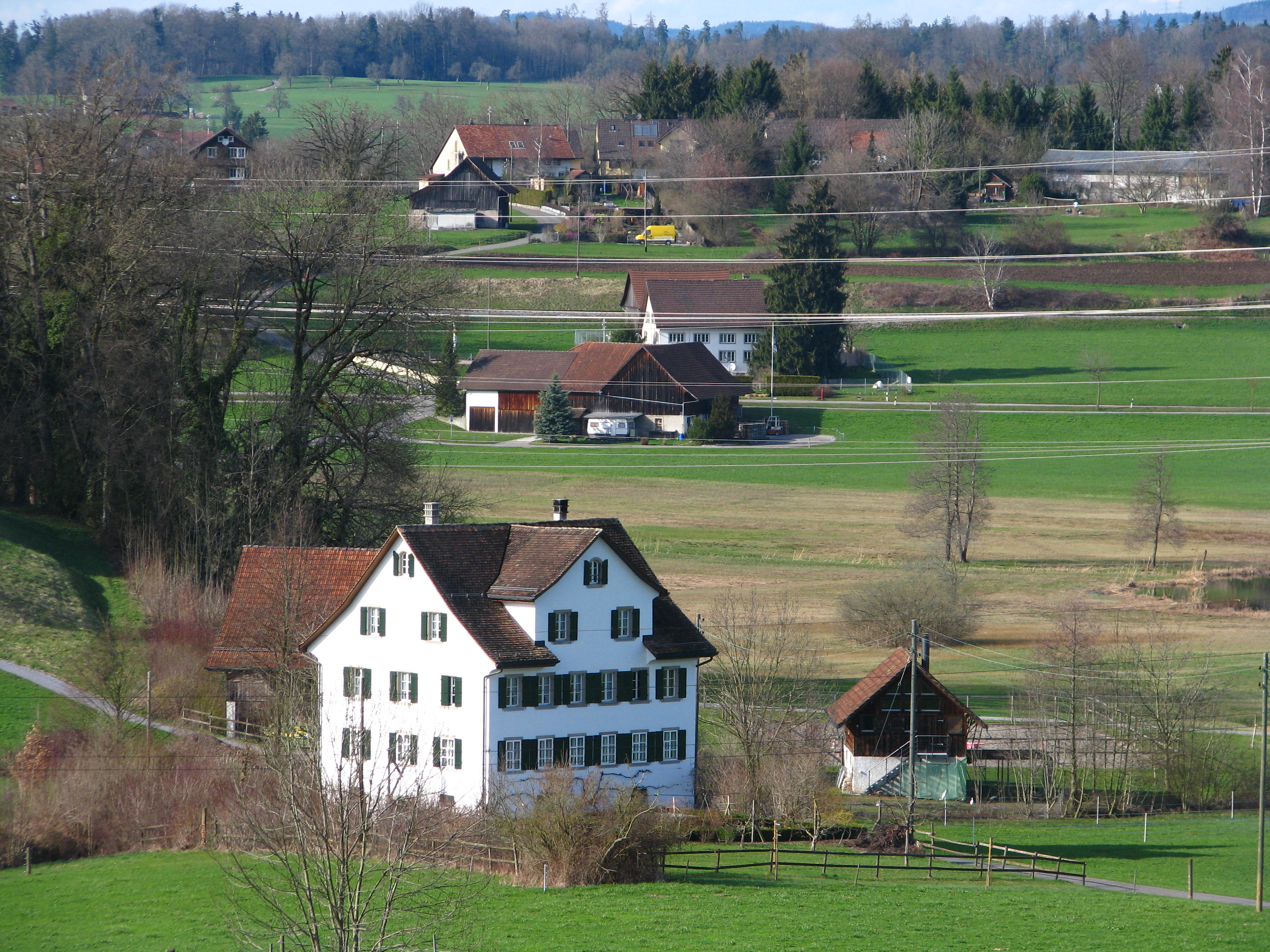
A farm, typical for the region Bubikon-Wolfhausen: farmhouse, bathhouse and barn

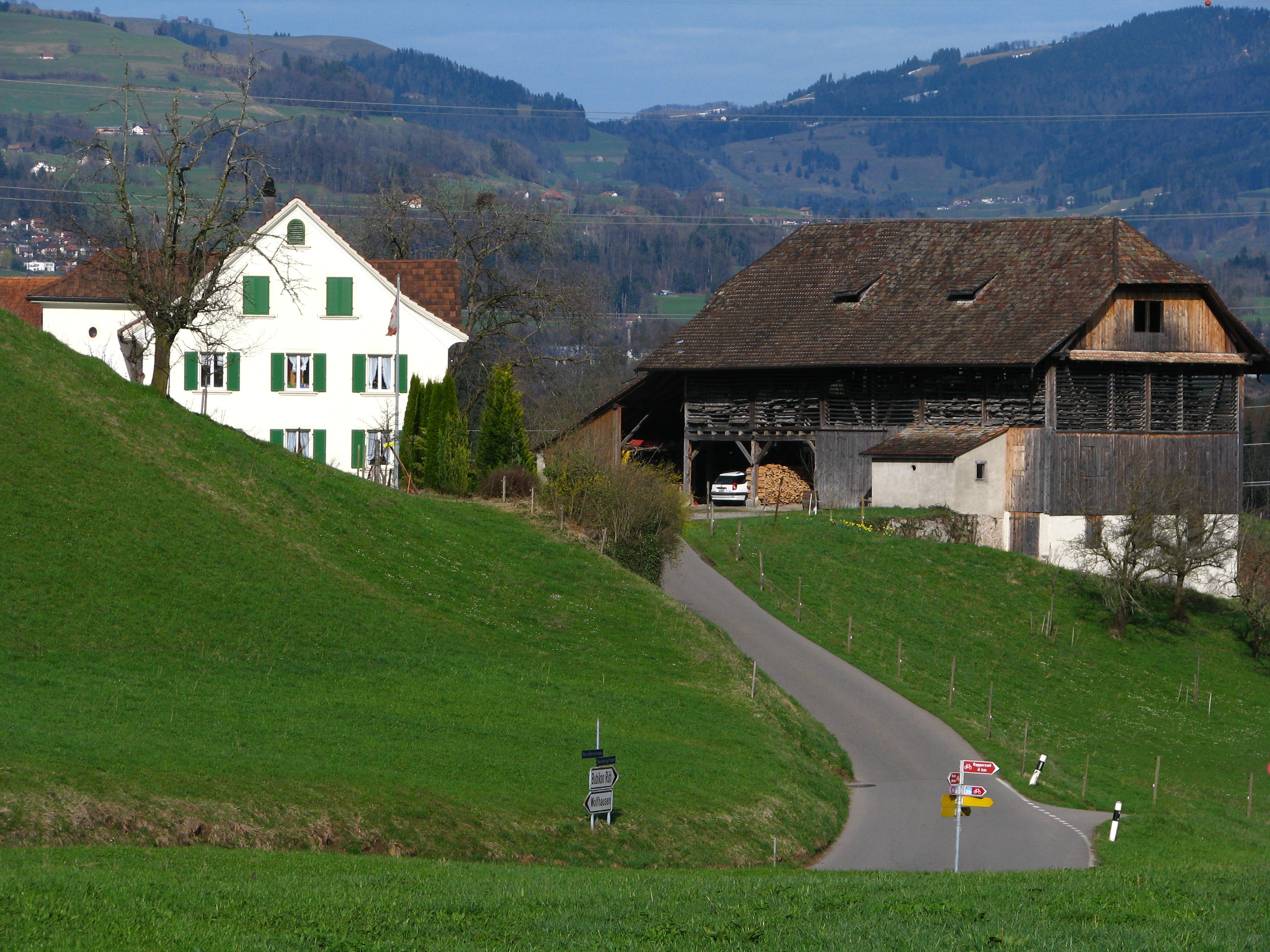
Barenberg, a small hamlet between the village of Wolfhausen and Kempraten
