= Canton of Zurich =

Canton of Switzerland

Canton of Zurich Kanton Zürich (German)
- Canton
- Flag Seal Coat of arms Logo
- Interactive map of Canton of Zurich
- Coordinates: 47°22′N 8°33′E
- Country: Switzerland
- Capital: Zurich (de facto) (Note: The cantonal constitution does not specify Zurich as its capital. However, the canton's government, highest court, legislature, and other canton level entities are all located in Zurich.)
- Subdivisions: 160 municipalities, 12 districts

Government
  - President: Mario Fehr
  - Executive: Regierungsrat (7)
  - Legislative: Cantonal Council (180)

Area
  - Total: 1,728.95 km^{2} (667.55 sq mi)

Population (December 2020)
  - Total: 1,553,423
  - Density: 898.478/km^{2} (2,327.05/sq mi)

GDP
  - Total: CHF 164.495 billion (2022)
  - Per capita: CHF 104,620 (2022)
- ISO 3166 code: CH-ZH
- Highest point: 1,292 m (4,239 ft): Schnebelhorn
- Lowest point: 332 m (1,089 ft): Rhine at the border in Weiach
- Joined: 1351
- Languages: German
- HDI: 0.993 (2023) very high · 1st of 7 regions
- Website: www.zh.ch

The canton of Zurich (Note: German: Kanton Zürich [ˈtsyːrɪç]; French: Canton de Zurich [zyʁik]; Romansh: Chantun Turitg; Italian: Canton Zurigo.) is an administrative unit (canton) of Switzerland, situated in the northeastern part of the country. With a population of 1,553,423 (as of 31 December 2020), it is the most populous canton of Switzerland. Zurich is the de facto capital of the canton, but is not specifically mentioned in the constitution. The official language is German. The local Swiss German dialect, called Züritüütsch, is commonly spoken.

The canton has the highest Human Development Index score (0.993) out of 1,790 subnational regions as of 2022. It is also a global financial center and has the fourth-highest GRP in Switzerland behind Basel-Stadt, Zug and Geneva by GDP per capita.

== History ==
=== Early history ===
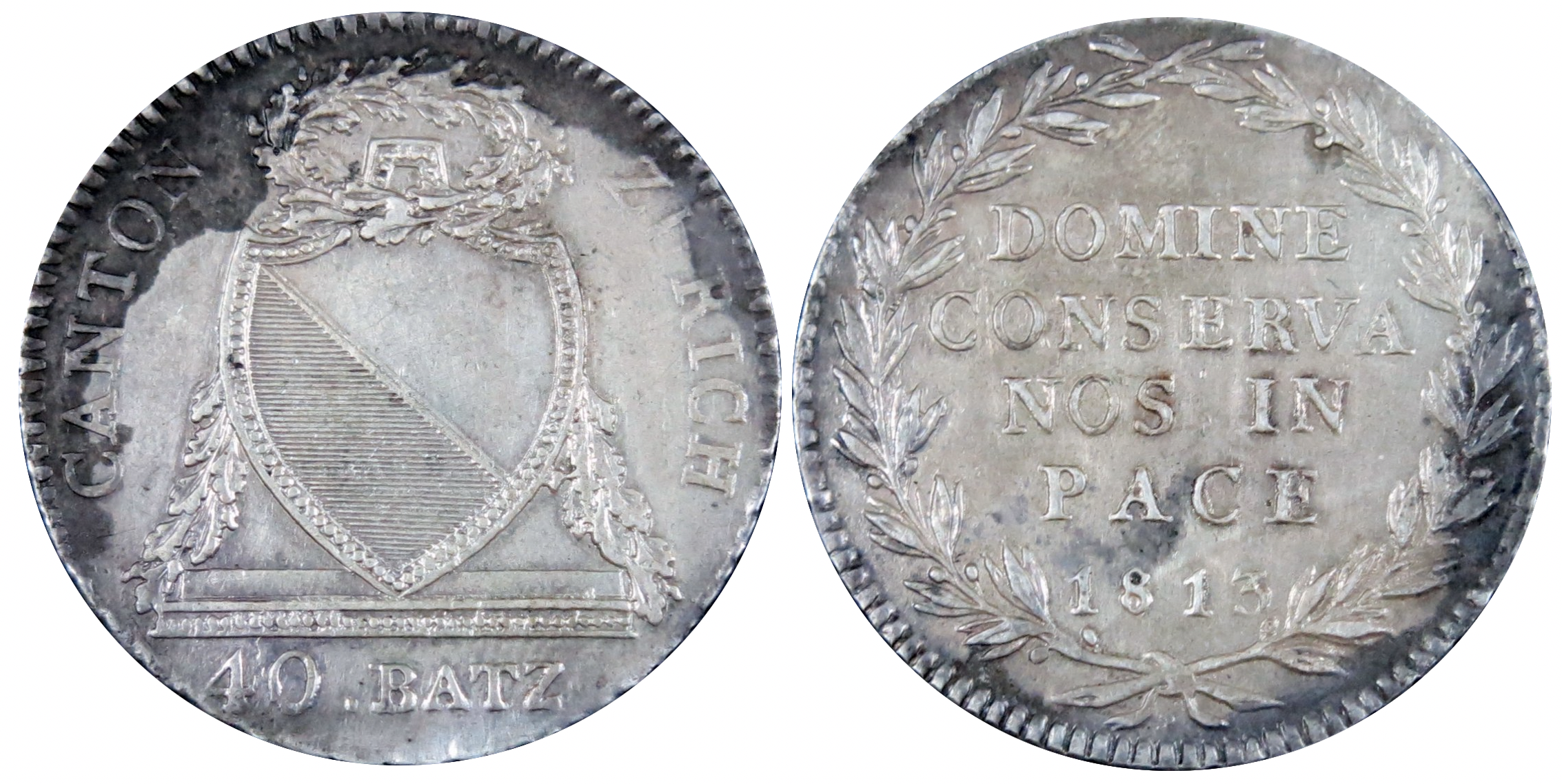
Zurich 40 batzen silver coin, 1813

The prehistoric pile dwellings around Lake Zurich, which are located around Lake Zurich in the cantons of Schwyz, St. Gallen and Zurich, make up a considerable portion of the 56 sites in Switzerland that are included in the UNESCO World Heritage Prehistoric pile dwellings around the Alps. Nine of these UNESCO World Heritage sites are located on the shore of Lake Zurich: Freienbach–Hurden Rosshorn, Freienbach–Hurden Seefeld, Rapperswil-Jona/Hombrechtikon–Feldbach, Rapperswil-Jona–Technikum, Erlenbach–Winkel, Meilen–Rorenhaab, Wädenswil–Vorder Au, Zürich–Enge Alpenquai and Kleiner Hafner. Because the lake has grown in size over time, the original piles are now around 4 metres (13 ft) to 7 metres (23 ft) under the water level of 406 metres (1,332 ft). Within an area of about 40 square kilometres (15 sq mi) around Lake Zurich, there are also the settlements Greifensee–Storen/Wildsberg at the Greifensee and Wetzikon–Robenhausen at the Pfäffikersee. As well as being part of the 56 Swiss sites of the UNESCO World Heritage Site, each of these 11 prehistoric pile dwellings is also listed as a Class object in the Swiss inventory of cultural property of national and regional significance.

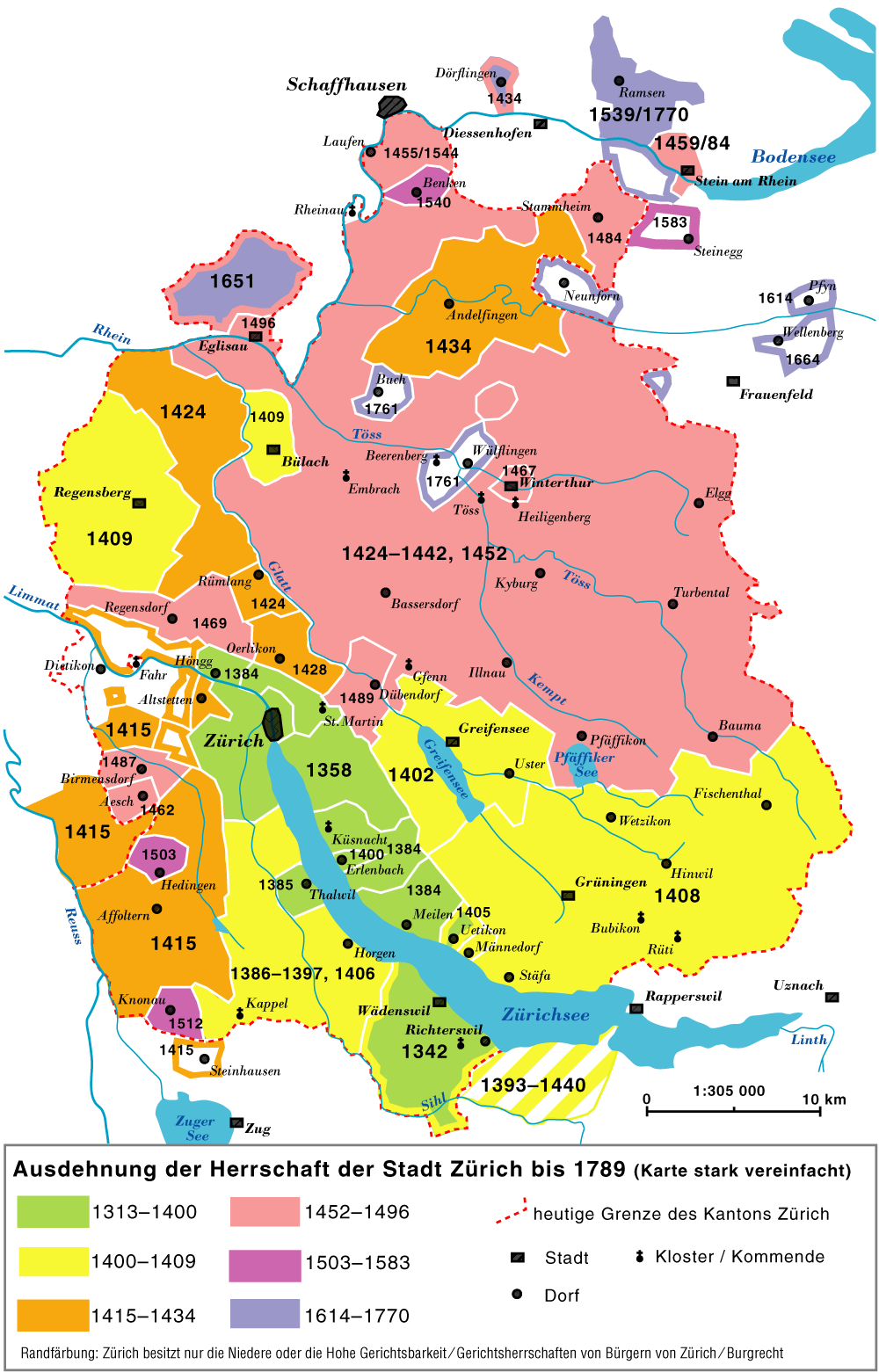
Territorial development of Zurich, 1313–1798

Zurihgauuia (Zürichgau) was a subdivision of Turgowe (Thurgau) in the Duchy of Alamannia, consisting roughly of the territory between Reuss and Töss. From the 740s, substantial portions of Zürichgau were owned by the Abbey of St. Gall. In c. 760, an administrative re-organisation under counts Ruthard and Warin exempted the castle town of Zurich from comital rule. A county of Zürichgau was established under Louis the Pious, for a count Ruadker, in 820. Zürichgau (Zurichgeuue) remained a nominally separate territory in the later 9th century but was often ruled by the same count as Thurgau. In 915, Zürichgau together with Thurgau fell to the Bucharding dukes of Swabia. In the late 10th century, the county of Zurich was ruled by the Nellenburger, and during 1077–1172 by the Lenzburger.

By the 13th century, Zürichgau was divided between the Habsburgs and the Kyburger, who held the territory west and east of Lake Zurich, respectively.

=== City state ===
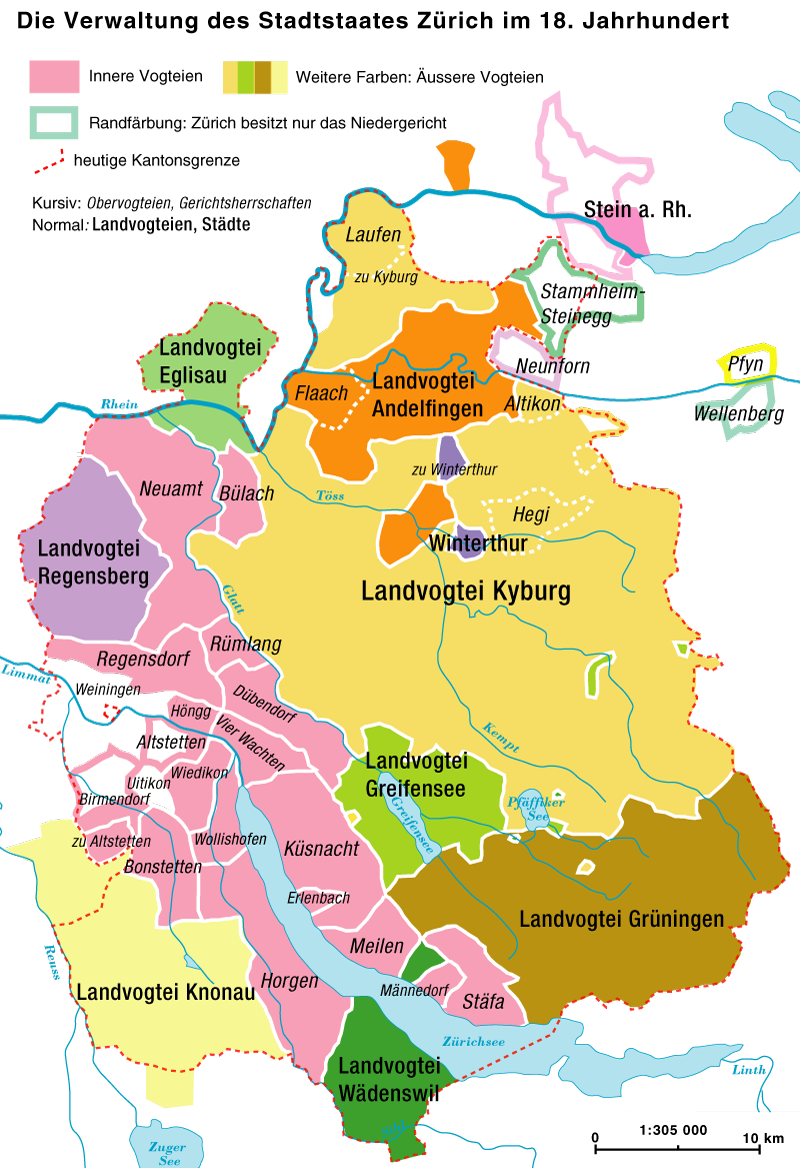
Administrative division of the Zürichgau in the 18th century.

The territory of the canton of Zurich corresponds to the lands acquired by the city of Zurich after it became reichsfrei in 1218. Zurich pursued a policy of aggressive territorial expansion especially during the century following the revolution of the guilds in 1336. Zurich joined the Swiss Confederacy in 1351.

Zurich claimed and lost the Toggenburg in the Old Zürich War of the 1440s. The northern parts up to the river Rhine came to the canton after the city of Zurich purchased Winterthur from the Habsburgs in 1468. In 1651, Zurich purchased Rafzerfeld from the counts of Sulz. At this point, almost all of the territory of the modern canton (as well as some territories beyond its modern borders) was owned by Zurich; exceptions include Wülflingen (acquired 1760), Buch (acquired 1761), Dietikon, which was a condominium, and Rheinau (owned by Rheinau Abbey).

In the 18th century, the "inner bailiwicks" (Innere Vogteien) were under direct administration of city officials, while the "outer bailiwicks" (Äussere Vogteien) were ruled by the reeves of Kyburg, Grüningen, Greifensee, Eglisau, Regensberg, Andelfingen, Wädenswil, and Knonau. The city of Winterthur was nominally subject to Zurich but retained far-reaching autonomy.

Zürichgau, the name of the medieval pagus, was in use for the territories of the city of Zurich during the 15th and 16th century; the term canton (Kanton) gradually entered use in the 16th century, but Zürichgau remained widely used well into the 19th century (becoming obsolescent after the formation of the modern canton in 1831).

Under the short-lived Helvetic Republic (1798–1803), the canton of Zurich became a purely administrative division. In 1803, some former possessions of Zurich to the west gained independence as part of the Canton of Aargau. In 1804 the Kantonspolizei Zürich was established as Landjägerkorps (rural police).

=== Modern canton ===
A cantonal constitution was drawn up in 1814 and replaced in 1831 by a radical-liberal constitution. The Züriputsch, an armed uprising of the conservative rural population against the radical-liberal order, led to the dissolution of the cantonal government, and a provisional conservative government was installed by colonel Paul Carl Eduard Ziegler. Under the threat of intervention of the other radical-liberal cantons of the Confederacy, the provisional government declared that the 1831 constitution would remain in effect. In a tumultuous session on 9 September 1839, the cantonal parliament declared its dissolution In the so-called Septemberregime, the newly elected cantonal government replaced all cantonal officials with conservatives, but it was again ousted by a radical-liberal election victory in 1844.

Alfred Escher was a member of the new cantonal parliament of 1844; he was elected to the cantonal government in 1848 and later in the same year into the first National Council under the new federal constitution. The radical-liberal era of 1844–1868 was dominated by the so-called System Escher, a network of liberal politicians and industrialists built by Alfred Escher. Escher governed the canton almost in monarchical fashion, and was popularly dubbed Alfred I. or Tsar of All Zurich. Escher controlled all cantonal institutions, at first with very little political opposition, expunging all trace of the conservative takeover of 1839. Under Escher, the city of Zurich rose to the status of economic and financial center it still retains. Opposition against the dominance of Sytstem Escher increased after 1863. The cantonal government was accused to continue the system of aristocratic rule liberalism had claimed to abolish. The oppositional Democratic Movement was centered in Winterthur, led by mayor Johann Jakob Sulzer and publicist Salomon Bleuler. They succeeded in imposing the introduction of the direct democratic instrument of the popular initiative in 1865, which precipitated a revision of the cantonal constitution. In April 1869, a new cantonal constitution was adopted by popular vote, introducing additional direct democratic elements and the popular election of both the cantonal government and the cantonal representatives in the federal Council of States. The new constitution also abolished the death penalty (the last execution by hanging in Zurich took place in 1810, the last public execution by guillotine in 1865), guaranteed freedom of religion and freedom of association and introduced progressive taxes.

In 1877, the Cantonal Laboratory Zurich was founded in order to regulate the quality of food and drinking water. The first cantonal chemist was Haruthiun Abeljanz, who was instrumental in setting up the new laboratory, moving it from an unpromising start in converted storage rooms to Lintheschergasse 10, which was located just behind the Pestalozziwiese, a memorial to Johann Heinrich Pestalozzi.

The Cantonal Bank was established in 1870 to regulate cantonal loans at fixed interest rates to farms and businesses.

A law of proportional representation was passed in 1916, favouring the rise of the Social Democrats. A proposal for the introduction of female suffrage was rejected in 1920; female suffrage was introduced on the municipal level in 1969 and on the cantonal level in 1970, shortly before its imposition by federal law, passed in 1971.

Economic growth continued in the 20th century. A first airport was built at Dübendorf in 1910, replaced by the international airport at Kloten in 1948. Rapid urbanisation expanded throughout the canton and beyond in the final decades of the 20th century, further accelerated by the S-Bahn from 1990, with only a few municipalities in Weinland, Knonaueramt and Oberland remaining out of easy commuting distance to the city.

The current constitution replaced the one of 1869 in January 2006.

The Antiquarische Gesellschaft in Zürich is an organization devoted to preserving the canton's history, the Staatsarchiv Zürich houses the state archives.

== Geography ==
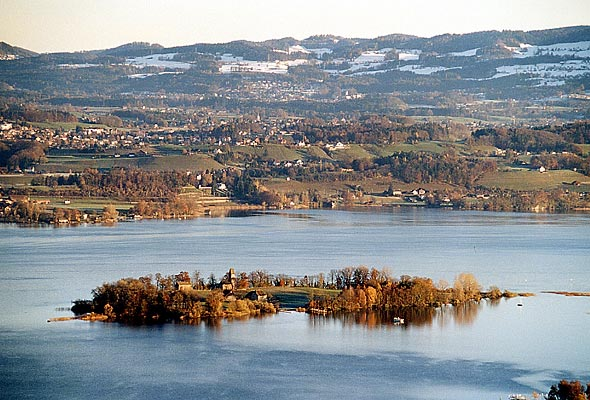
Lake Zurich and the island of Ufenau (canton of Schwyz), the largest in Switzerland

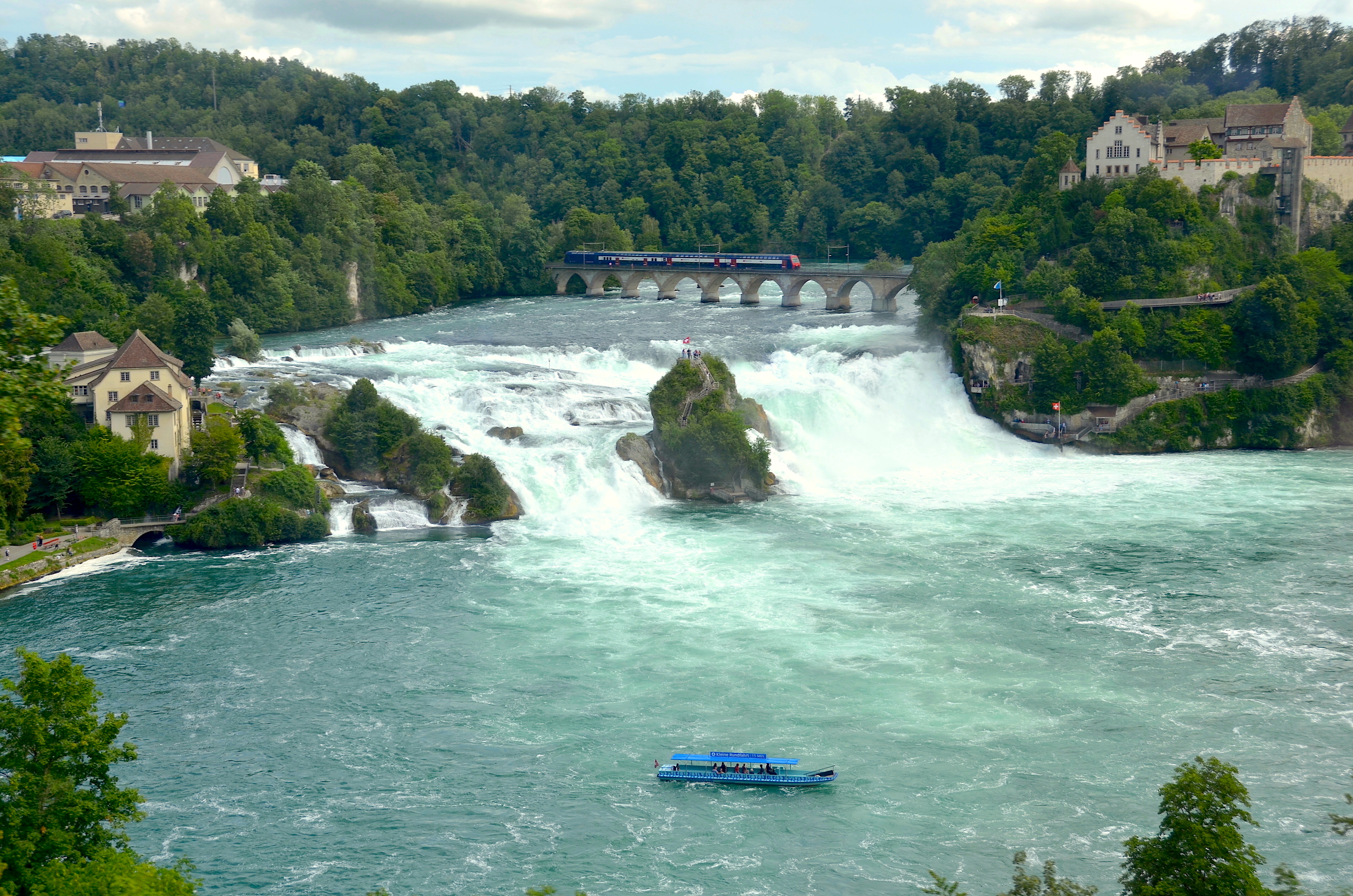
Rhine Falls on the border of the cantons of Schaffhausen (left) and Zurich (right)

The vast majority of the canton lies to the south of the Rhine. The exceptions being the Rafzerfeld, acquired by the canton in 1651, and a tiny portion of the village of Laufen-Uhwiesen called Nohl. Its neighbouring cantons are Schaffhausen to the north, Aargau to the west, the cantons of Zug and Schwyz to the south and the cantons of Thurgau and St. Gallen to the east. It also has an international border with the German district of Waldshut and though only for 460 m (1,510 ft) the district of Konstanz in Baden-Württemberg owing to its short border with Stemmer, an outlying hamlet belonging to the municipality which forms the small German enclave of Büsingen am Hochrhein.

The canton of Zurich can be roughly divided into its capital city (Zurich) and lakeside areas (including the Goldcoast), the Unterland in the northwest, the Oberland in the southeast, the Weinland and Winterthur in the northeast, and the Knonaueramt southwest of the Albis. The Zurich Metropolitan Area extends beyond the cantonal borders.

The canton is situated in the eastern part of the Swiss Plateau. In the northwest and southeast, its territory rises towards the Jura (Lägern) and Alps (Appenzell Alps, Schwyz Alps), respectively. The canton lies entirely within the drainage basin of the High Rhine. It is characterized by glacial landform and traversed by a series of rivers generally flowing south-east to north-west (except for the Jona). These rivers are (listed west to east): Reuss, Reppisch, Sihl, Linth-Limmat (forming Lake Zurich), Glatt, Töss, Jona and Thur. The main lakes are Lake Zurich (Linth-Limmat, 88 km^{2} / 34 sq mi), Greifensee (Glatt, 8.4 km^{2} / 3.2 sq mi) and Pfäffikersee (Glatt, 3.3 km^{2} / 1.3 sq mi). Minor lakes include Türlersee (Limmat), Katzensee (Glatt), Hüttnersee (Sihl), Lützelsee (Limmat) and Egelsee (Limmat).

The valley of the Linth leads into the Lake Zurich and continues as the Limmat. This valley is the most significant valley of the canton of Zurich. The valley of the Glatt originates at the Greifensee and is separated from the Limmat by a ridge that includes the Zürichberg, Öschbrig and Pfannenstiel. West of the city of Zurich, the Limmat Valley is separated from the Furt Valley by a ridge that includes the Altberg and Käferberg. The Lägern separates the Furt Valley from the When Valley.

The Töss Valley is located in the east of the canton and is separated from the Toggenburg area in the canton of St. Gallen by a mountainous area (traversed by the Hulftegg Pass). The Hörnli (1,133 m / 3,717 ft) is the highest elevation of this mountain ridge. The Schnebelhorn is a mountain located near Fischenthal in the Töss Valley, between the cantons of Zurich (west) and St. Gallen (east). It is the highest summit (1,292 m / 4,239 ft) of the canton of Zurich. The watershed between the Töss and Jona is located near Gibswil. From there, the Jona Valley runs mainy southwards towards Wald and then westwards towards Rüti, eventually flowing into Obersee (Lake Zurich) in the canton of St. Gallen.

The Sihl Valley is located in the west of the canton. The Sihl converges with the Limmat in the city of Zurich at Platzspitz park. The Sihl Valley is separated from Lake Zurich by the Zimmerberg. From the valley of the Reppisch (Knonaueramt), it is separated by the Albis Range. The Albishorn (915 m / 3,002 ft) is the highest elevation of this range. The Uetliberg is also part of the Albis Range. This mountain is popular with the population of the city of Zurich for recreation.

The Rhine Falls (German: Rheinfall), Europe's largest waterfall and popular tourist attraction, are located on the border between the cantons of Zurich and Schaffhausen, between Laufen-Uhwiesen and Neuhausen am Rheinfall. On the Zurich side, the Laufen Castle (Schloss Laufen) overlooks the waterfall.

The canton of Zurich has an area of 1,728.8 square kilometers (667.5 mi^{2}). As of 2011, of this area, 43.4% is used for agricultural purposes, while 30.7% is forested. Of the rest of the land, 20.1% is settled (buildings or roads) and 5.8% is unproductive land.

== Symbols ==
=== Coat of arms ===
The blazon of the coat of arms is Per bend azure and argent.

=== Seal ===
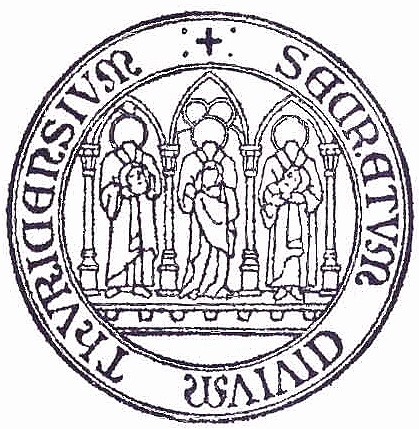
State seal of the canton of Zurich

The state seal of the canton of Zurich depicts, from left to right, Felix and Regula, the patron saints of Zurich, and their servant Exuperantius. The three figures, decapitated, hold their heads in their hands stand on a platform between four Gothic columns joined by arches. The image is surrounded by the text "SECRETVM CIVIVM THVRICENSIVM" (lit. 'Secret Seal of the Citizens of Zurich'). The seal originated as the seal of the city of Zurich (German: Stadtsiegel), first attested in 1349, and was adopted by the canton as its state seal (German: Staatssiegel) in the 19th century. The original seals were given to the Staatsarchiv Zürich in 1851. Nowadays, simply images of the seal are attached to documents in place of the original wax seal. The seal is used at the end of every resolution of the Government Council of Zürich and in different ways by other branches of government.

== Government ==
=== Legislative power ===
The Cantonal Council (Kantonsrat) has 180 members elected every four years.

=== Executive power ===
The canton is governed by a seven-member council (Regierungsrat). On 24 March 2019, the following were elected for four years:

- Jacqueline Fehr (SP)
- Mario Fehr (Independent)
- Martin Neukom (Greens)
- Natalie Rickli (SVP)
- Silvia Steiner (CVP)
- Ernst Stocker (SVP)
- Carmen Walker Späh (FDP)

== Political subdivisions ==
=== Districts ===
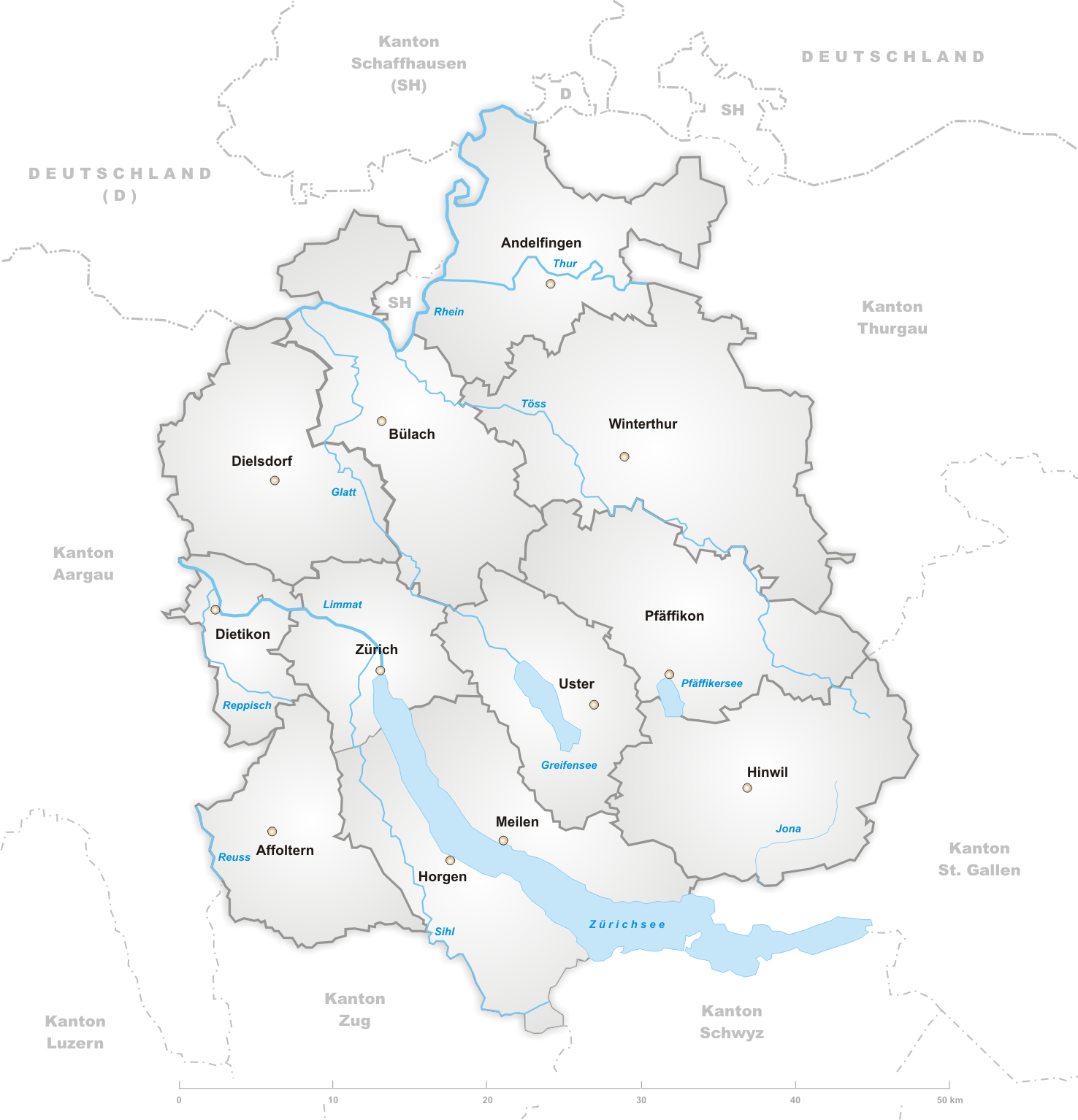
Districts in the canton of Zurich

The canton is divided into 12 districts (German: Bezirke):

- Zurich comprises the city of Zurich
- Affoltern with capital Affoltern am Albis
- Andelfingen with capital Andelfingen
- Bülach with capital Bülach
- Dielsdorf with capital Dielsdorf
- Dietikon with capital Dietikon
- Hinwil with capital Hinwil
- Horgen with capital Horgen
- Meilen with capital Meilen
- Pfäffikon with capital Pfäffikon
- Uster with capital Uster
- Winterthur with capital Winterthur

=== Municipalities ===
There are, as of January 2024, 160 municipalities in the canton (Politische Gemeinden).

=== Merger of municipalities ===
There were no changes between 1934 and 2013, but the following occurred after 2013.

- 2014: Bertschikon bei Attikon and Wiesendangen → Wiesendangen
- 2015: Bauma and Sternenberg → Bauma
- 2016: Kyburg → Illnau-Effretikon.

== Politics ==
In the 2011 federal election the most popular party was the SVP which received 29.8% of the vote. The next three most popular parties were the SP (19.3%), the FDP (11.6%) and the glp (11.5%).

The SVP received about the same percentage of the vote as they did in the 2007 Federal election (33.9% in 2007 vs 29.8% in 2011). The SPS retained about the same popularity (19.8% in 2007), as well as the FDP (13.2% in 2007), while the glp was the big winner of the election (7.0% in 2007).

=== Federal election results ===
Percentage of the total vote per party in the canton in the Federal Elections 1971–2019
Party	Ideology	1971	1975	1979	1983	1987	1991	1995	1999	2003	2007	2011	2015	2019
SVP/UDC	Right-wing populism	12.2	11.3	14.5	13.8	15.2	20.2	25.5	32.5	33.4	33.9	29.8	30.7	26.7
SP/PS	Social democracy	20.9	23.9	26.5	23.0	17.4	18.8	23.1	25.6	25.7	19.8	19.3	21.4	17.3
GPS/PES	Green politics	*	*	1.3	4.2	8.0	7.0	6.5	4.1	8.5	10.4	8.4	6.9	14.1
GLP/PVL	Green liberalism	*	*	*	*	*	*	*	*	*	7.0	11.5	8.2	14.0
FDP.The Liberals^{a}	Classical liberalism	16.8	18.5	22.4	21.8	20.3	18.7	18.1	17.8	16.2	13.2	11.6	15.3	13.7
CVP/PDC/PPD/PCD	Christian democracy	9.5	9.4	9.7	9.1	7.1	5.9	4.9	5.1	5.4	7.6	5.0	4.2	4.4
EVP/PEV	Christian democracy	5.2	5.4	5.7	5.4	4.4	4.8	3.7	3.4	4.1	3.7	3.1	3.1	3.3
BDP/PBD	Conservatism	*	*	*	*	*	*	*	*	*	*	5.3	3.6	1.6
EDU/UDF	Christian right	*	0.5	0.4	0.6	1.8	1.8	1.9	1.8	2.1	2.1	2.2	2.1	1.6
PdA/PST-POP/PC/PSL	Communism	1.6	1.1	1.2	0.3	0.3	*	*	*	*	0.2	0.2	0.2	0.3
SD/DS	Swiss nationalism	5.0	4.4	2.5	5.9	5.0	5.2	3.3	1.5	0.9	0.5	0.3	0.2	0.2
LPS/PLS	Libertarianism	* ^{b}	*	*	*	*	*	0.5	0.2	*	*	*	*	*
Ring of Independents	Social liberalism	16.5	15.6	11.2	9.9	11.6	6.1	5.3	2.1	*	*	*	*	*
CSP/PCS	Christian socialism	*	*	*	*	*	*	0.2	0.2	*	0.1	0.2	*	*
POCH	Communism	*	1.5	2.3	3.8	3.8	^{e}	*	*	*	*	*	*	*
FGA	Feminism	*	*	*	0.6	^{c}	2.4	2.7	1.8	1.4	1.1	^{d}	^{d}	^{d}
Rep.	Right-wing populism	10.4	6.2	0.9	0.0	0.5	0.0	0.0	0.0	0.0	0.0	0.0	0.0	*
FPS/PSL	Right-wing populism	*	*	*	*	3.8	5.9	3.5	0.8	0.1	0.1	*	*	*
Other		2.0	2.2	1.6	1.5	0.8	3.3	0.9	3.0	2.2	0.3	3.1	4.2	3.3
Voter participation %		57.8	50.4	46.4	46.9	47.5	46.3	43.0	45.1	45.1	49.0	46.8	47.2	

^a FDP before 2009, FDP.The Liberals after 2009
^b "*" indicates that the party was not on the ballot in this canton.
^c Part of a coalition with the POCH
^d Part of a coalition with the parties listed under Other
^e Party fragmented, part remained in a coalition with the FGA and the remainder joining the Green Party

== Demographics ==
Historical population
Year	Pop.	±%
1850	250,698	—
1860	266,265	+6.2%
1870	284,047	+6.7%
1880	316,074	+11.3%
1888	337,183	+6.7%
1900	431,036	+27.8%
1910	503,915	+16.9%
1920	538,602	+6.9%
1930	617,706	+14.7%
1941	674,505	+9.2%
1950	777,002	+15.2%
1960	952,304	+22.6%
1970	1,107,788	+16.3%
1980	1,122,839	+1.4%
1990	1,179,044	+5.0%
2000	1,247,906	+5.8%
2010	1,373,068	+10.0%
2020	1,553,423	+13.1%
Source: Federal Statistical Office

Zurich has a population (as of December 2020) of 1,553,423. As of 2010, 23.7% of the population are resident foreign nationals. Over the last 10 years (2000–2010) the population has changed at a rate of 12.7%. Migration accounted for 10.3%, while births and deaths accounted for 2.6%.

Most of the population (as of 2000) speaks German (1,040,168 or 83.4%) as their first language, Italian is the second most common (49,750 or 4.0%) and Serbo-Croatian is the third (21,334 or 1.7%). There are 17,685 people who speak French and 2,606 people who speak Romansh.

Of the population in the canton, 314,394 or about 25.2% were born in Zurich and lived there in 2000. There were 291,631 or 23.4% who were born in the same canton, while 284,461 or 22.8% were born somewhere else in Switzerland, and 310,532 or 24.9% were born outside of Switzerland.

As of 2000, children and teenagers (0–17 years old) make up 20.5% of the population, while adults (18–64 years old) make up 64.4% and seniors (over 64 years old) make up 15%. As of 2000, there were 531,094 people who were single and never married in the canton. There were 566,636 married individuals, 66,012 widows or widowers and 84,164 individuals who are divorced.

As of 2000, there were 567,573 private households in the canton, and an average of 2.1 persons per household. There were 223,869 households that consist of only one person and 27,935 households with five or more people. As of 2009, the construction rate of new housing units was 5.3 new units per 1000 residents. As of 2003 the average price to rent an average apartment in the city of Zurich was 1288.84 Swiss francs (CHF) per month (US$1030, £580, €820 approx. exchange rate from 2003). The average rate for a one-room apartment was 733.01 CHF (US$590, £330, €470), a two-room apartment was about 1009.94 CHF (US$810, £450, €650), a three-room apartment was about 1192.66 CHF (US$950, £540, €760) and a six or more room apartment cost an average of 2550.35 CHF (US$2040, £1150, €1630). The average apartment price in the city of Zurich was 115.5% of the national average of 1116 CHF.

The vacancy rate for the canton, in 2010, was 0.63%.

== Religion ==
In 1519, Huldrych Zwingli became the pastor of the Grossmünster in Zurich, and soon thereafter Zurich became a reformed or Protestant canton. Even though Zwingli died in battle in 1531, the canton remained a stronghold of the Swiss Reformed Church over the following centuries. While a plurality of the population is Protestant (43%), 31% of the population was Roman Catholic in 2004, a legacy of considerable immigration from Southern Europe.

From the 2000 census, 497,986 or 39.9% belonged to the Swiss Reformed Church, while 380,440 or 30.5% were Roman Catholic. Of the rest of the population, there were 29,592 members of an Orthodox church (or about 2.37% of the population), there were 1,435 individuals (or about 0.11% of the population) who belonged to the Christian Catholic Church, and there were 70,897 individuals (or about 5.68% of the population) who belonged to another Christian church. There were 6,461 individuals (or about 0.52% of the population) who were Jewish, and 66,520 (or about 5.33% of the population) who were Islamic. There were 5,878 individuals who were Buddhist, 6,024 individuals who were Hindu and 1,456 individuals who belonged to another church. 165,324 (or about 13.25% of the population) belonged to no church, are agnostic or atheist, and 50,090 individuals (or about 4.01% of the population) did not answer the question.

== Economy ==
Most of the land is cultivated, but the canton of Zurich is not considered as an agricultural area. The lands to the north and east are more agricultural, but in every part of the canton manufacturing predominates. The canton of Zurich is noted for machinery. Silk and cotton weaving were important in the past, but have now ceased to be of importance. There is a large paper industry. Small and middle sized companies are important contributors to the economy of the canton of Zurich. The city of Zurich is a major banking centre, and insurance is also of importance.

In 2014, about 1.2% of the workers in Zurich work in the primary sector (the total for all of Switzerland is 3.3%). In 2014 the secondary sector employed 145,744 or about 14.7% of the total, which is much lower than 21.8% for the entire country. Of those in the secondary sector, over a quarter of the workers worked in construction trades and 9.5% worked in general construction. Additionally, almost 9% of the workers manufactured electronics. The tertiary sector employed 836,410 or about 84.1% of the total, which is much higher than 74.9% nationwide. This number has increased by about 180,000 since 2010 while the population in the canton has only increased by 73,000 over the same time period. Of those in the tertiary sector, the fourth largest sub-sector (in 2008) was financial services with 6.2% of the tertiary total.

As of 2010, Zurich had an unemployment rate of 3.9%. As of 2008, there were 12,507 people employed in the primary economic sector and about 4,227 businesses involved in this sector. 143,231 people were employed in the secondary sector and there were 11,383 businesses in this sector. 655,848 people were employed in the tertiary sector, with 58,796 businesses in this sector.

In 2008 the total number of full-time equivalent jobs was 678,306. The number of jobs in the primary sector was 8,120, of which 7,771 were in agriculture, 320 were in forestry or lumber production and 29 were in fishing or fisheries. The number of jobs in the secondary sector was 133,723 of which 81,212 or (60.7%) were in manufacturing, 774 or (0.6%) were in mining and 47,014 (35.2%) were in construction.

The number of jobs in the tertiary sector was 536,463. In the tertiary sector; 105,226 or 19.6% were in the sale or repair of motor vehicles, 38,005 or 7.1% were in the movement and storage of goods, 33,417 or 6.2% were in a hotel or restaurant, 35,571 or 6.6% were in the information industry, 81,163 or 15.1% were the insurance or financial industry, 65,139 or 12.1% were technical professionals or scientists, 36,792 or 6.9% were in education and 63,800 or 11.9% were in health care.

Of the working population, 37.4% used public transportation to get to work, and 41.8% used a private car.

The cantonal, local and church tax rates in the canton are generally slightly lower than the average rate for the entire country.

== Transport ==
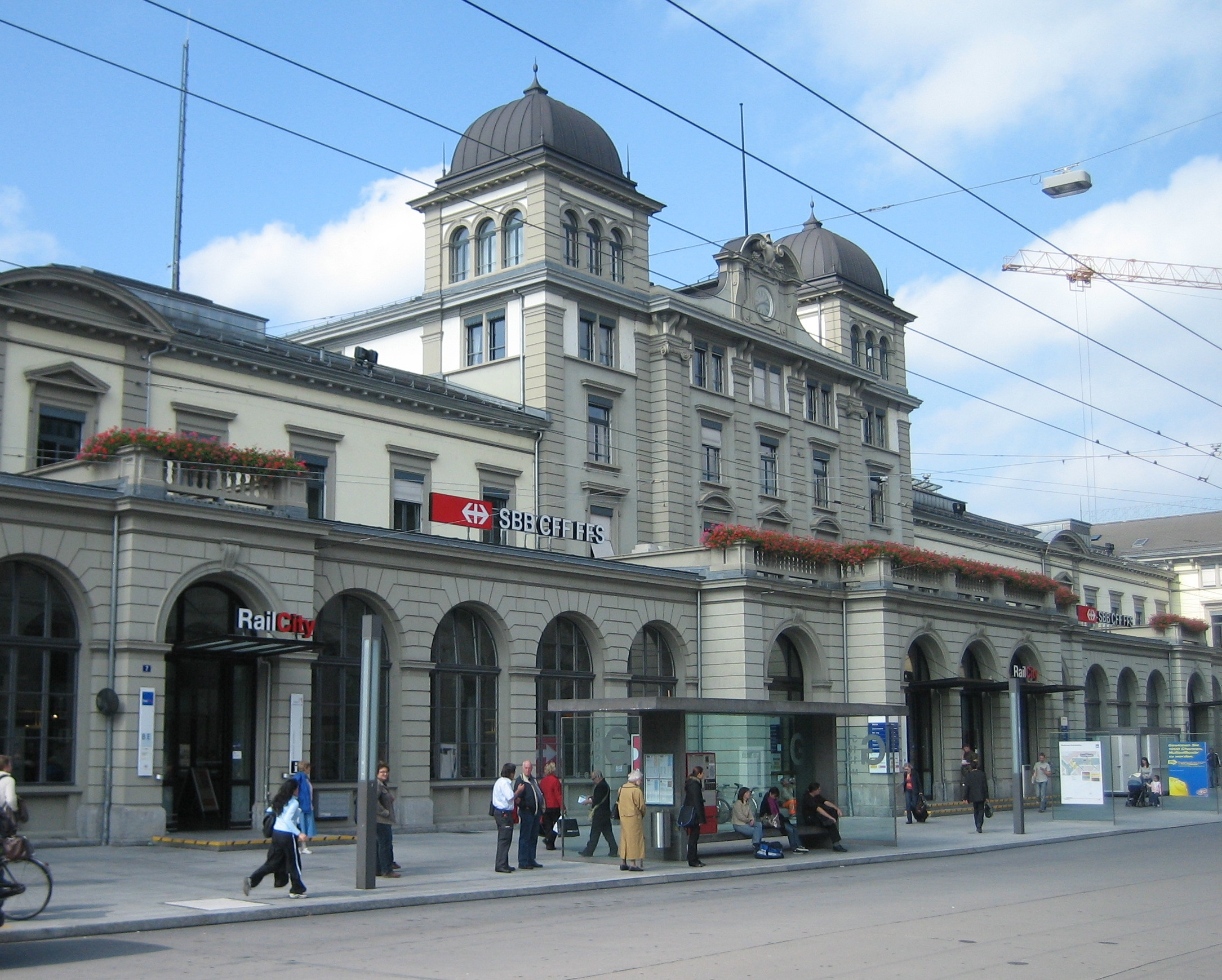
Winterthur railway station, the second railway hub in the canton

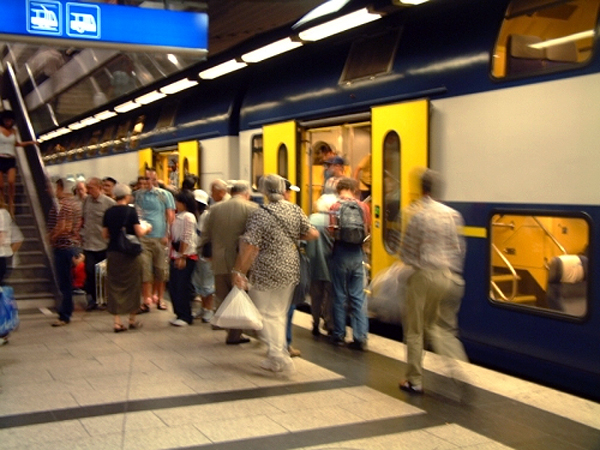
Zurich S-Bahn commuters at Zürich HB

=== Rail ===
The first railway entirely within Switzerland ran in the Limmat valley in 1847, connecting Zurich with Baden in the canton of Aargau. Today, railways run through all major valleys in the canton of Zurich. Some lines, such as the Bülach–Baden railway and Uerikon–Bauma railway (UeBB), were later closed and mostly dismantled (part of the UeBB line is used by DVZO heritage trains today). Also the Joweid rack railway in Rüti was closed.

The centre for transport is the city of Zurich, where a great number of regional railway lines of the Zurich S-Bahn (on behalf of ZVV) connect to national and international rail links. The main railway station in the city of Zurich, Zürich Hauptbahnhof (Zürich HB), is one of the busiest in Europe, counting the number of arriving and departing trains. Zürich HB is well connected to other European cities through major international trains, such as ICE, TGV, Railjet, EuroCity (previously also the Cisalpino), and sleeper trains (EuroNight/NightJet) and national trains (InterCity, InterRegio, RegioExpress).

=== Trams ===
The city of Zurich has an extensive tram network, which is connected to the Forchbahn, Glattalbahn and Limmattalbahn that run outside of the city's limits. Three other tramways in the canton, the Uster–Oetwil tramway, Wetzikon–Meilen tramway and Winterthur tramway, have been dismantled.

=== Busses ===
Several bus operators provide regional and local services, such as PostAuto, VBG, VBZ, VZO, and Zimmerbergbus.

=== Ships ===
Passenger boat cruises on Lake Zurich and the Limmat are operated by ZSG. The Zürichsee-Fähre Horgen–Meilen is a ferry across Lake Zurich between Horgen and Meilen. The smaller Greifensee and the section of the High Rhine between Eglisau and Ellikon am Rhein (municipality of Marthalen) are also operated by passenger boats.

=== Cable Car ===
The Adliswil-Felsenegg cable car (LAF) links Adliswil in the Sihl Valley with Felsenegg.

=== Unified fare system ===
Train, tram, bus, boat and cable car services in the canton operate within the ZVV Tariff Network and can be used with the same ticket.

=== Airport ===
The major airport of Switzerland, Zurich Airport, is located in Kloten, a mere 12 kilometres (7.5 miles) from the city centre of Zurich. It is home to Swiss International Air Lines. Two other, non-commercial airporst are Winterthur Hegmatten (LSPH) and Speck (LSZK). Dübendorf Air Base was a military air field.

=== Roads ===
The A1, A3 and A4 motorways run through the canton. Other motorways and expressways which also run through the canton include the A7, the A51, the A52 and the A53. Major hubs are Zurich and Winterthur. There are six mountain passes in the canton: Albis Pass, Buechenegg Pass, Ghöch Pass, Hirzel Pass, Hulftegg Pass, and Schufelberger Egg Pass.

== Education ==
In Zurich about 493,209 or (39.5%) of the population have completed non-mandatory upper secondary education, and 212,154 or (17.0%) have completed additional higher education (either university or a Fachhochschule). Of the 212,154 who completed tertiary schooling, 55.8% were Swiss men, 25.5% were Swiss women, 11.6% were non-Swiss men and 7.1% were non-Swiss women.
