= Stadt Zürich (1909 ship) =

Swiss steam paddle ship on Lake Zurich

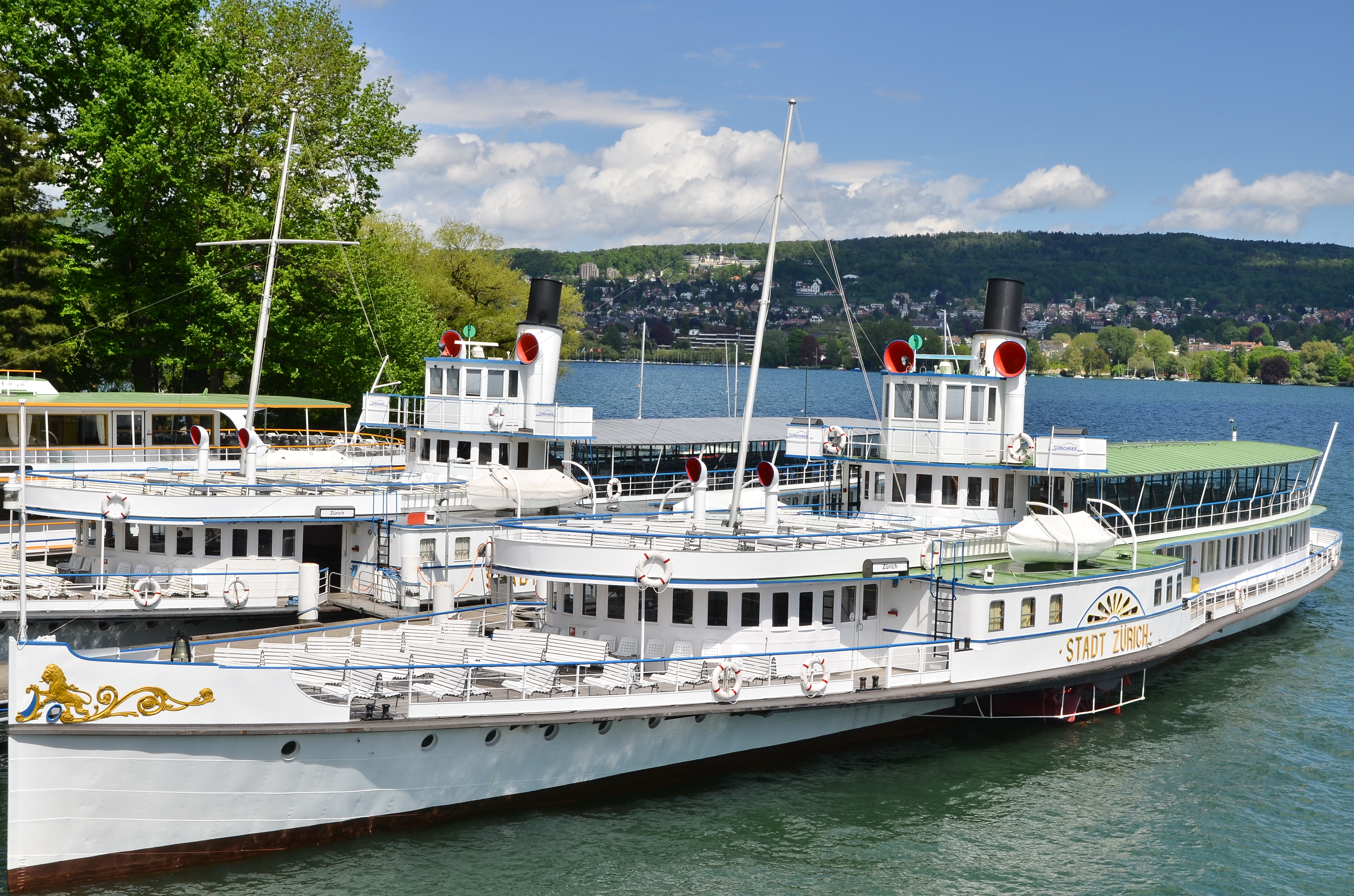
- Stadt Zürich in 2015

History

Switzerland
- Name: Stadt Zürich
- Namesake: Zürich
- Owner: Zürichsee-Schifffahrtsgesellschaft (ZSG)
- Operator: ZSG
- Route: Zürich-Rapperswil SG-Zürich
- Ordered: 1908
- Builder: Escher, Wyss & Cie.
- Cost: 320,000 Swiss francs
- Yard number: 565
- Christened: May 8, 1909
- Maiden voyage: June 12, 1909
- Home port: Zürich-Wollishofen
- Status: in service

General characteristics
- Class & type: Steamboat
- Type: Paddle steamer
- Displacement: 260 tonnes
- Length: 59.10 m
- Beam: 13.50 m
- Draught: 7.00 m
- Installed power: 365 kW (500 PS)
- Propulsion: compound steam engine; 2 cylinders; 57 rpm at max. 13 bar
- Speed: 27 km/h (15 kn)
- Boats & landing craft carried: 2
- Capacity: 750
- Crew: 6
- Sensors & processing systems: Radar, Echo sounding, GPS

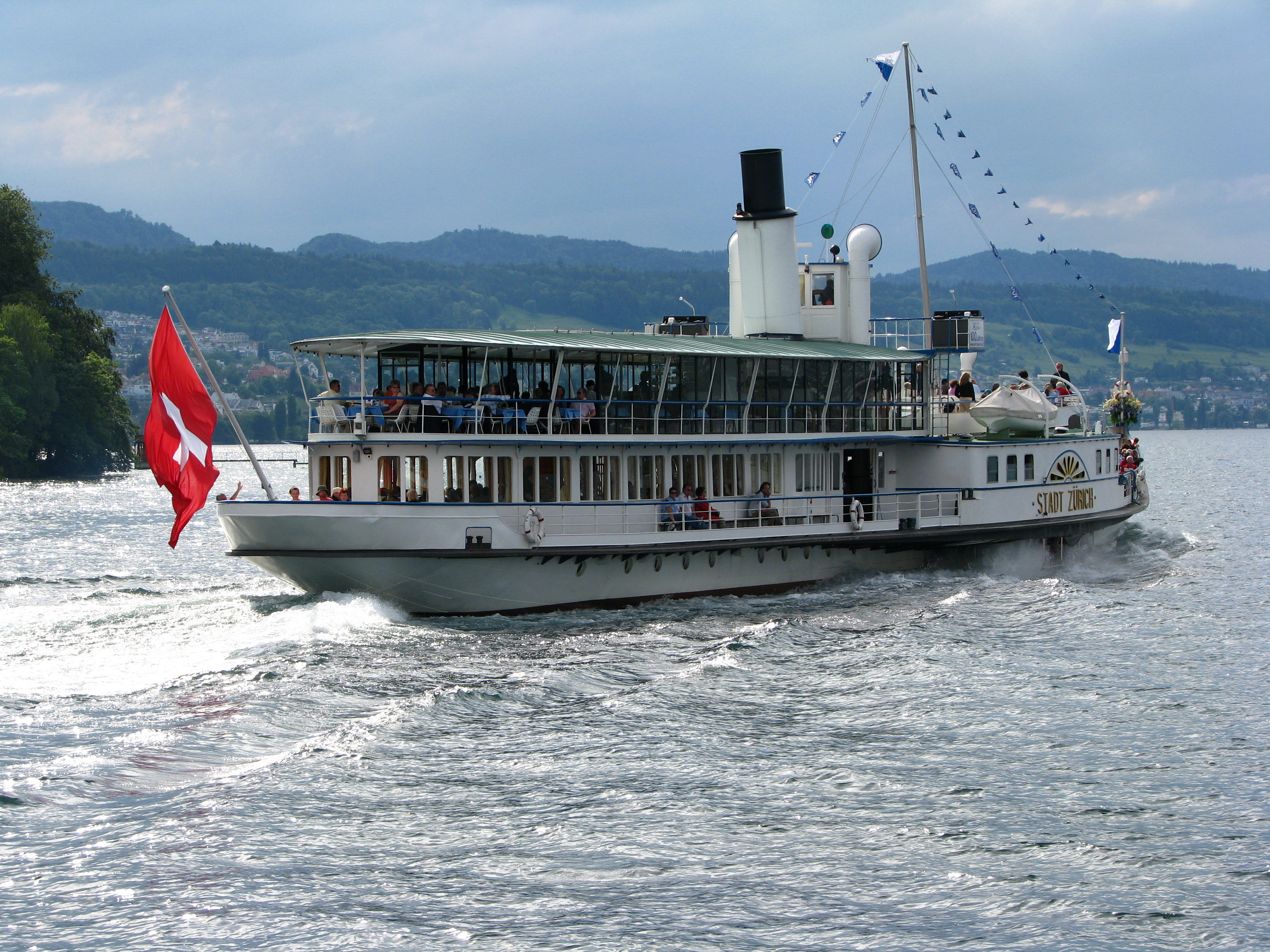
Stadt Zürich near Au peninsula (May 2009)

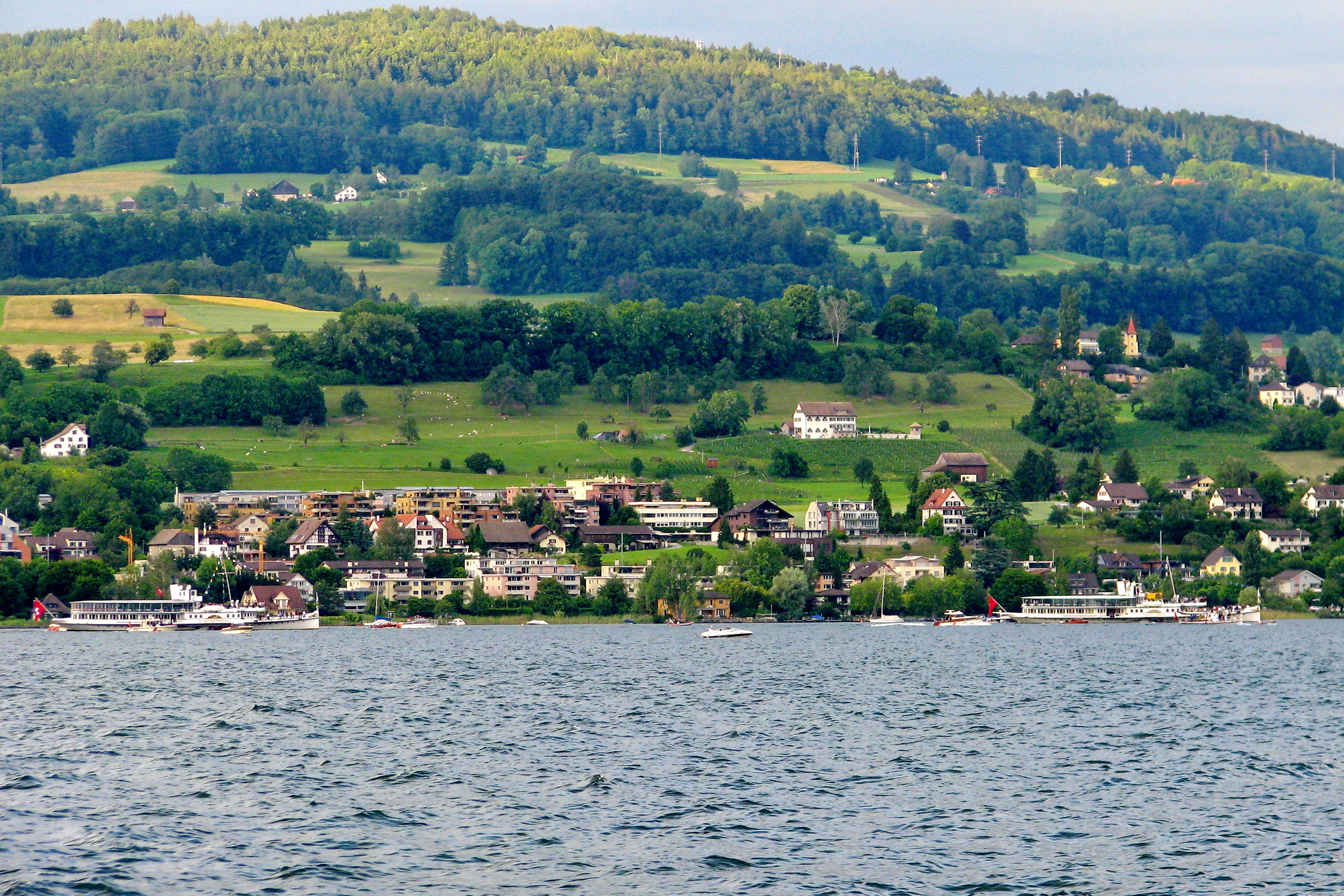
Paddle steamers Stadt Rapperswil (to the left) and Stadt Zürich on centennial tour, Pfannenstiel mountain in the background (June 12, 2009)

The PS Stadt Zürich is the older of the two remaining steam paddle ships on Lake Zürich. Stadt Zürich was built in 1909 by Escher, Wyss & Cie. in Zürich for the Zürichsee-Schifffahrtsgesellschaft, as the 32nd tourist ship on Lake Zürich. In contrast to most other Swiss paddle steamers, the most striking features of this vessel and its sister ship Stadt Rapperswil (1914) are a short smoke stack, and a spacious 1st class upper deck.

== History ==
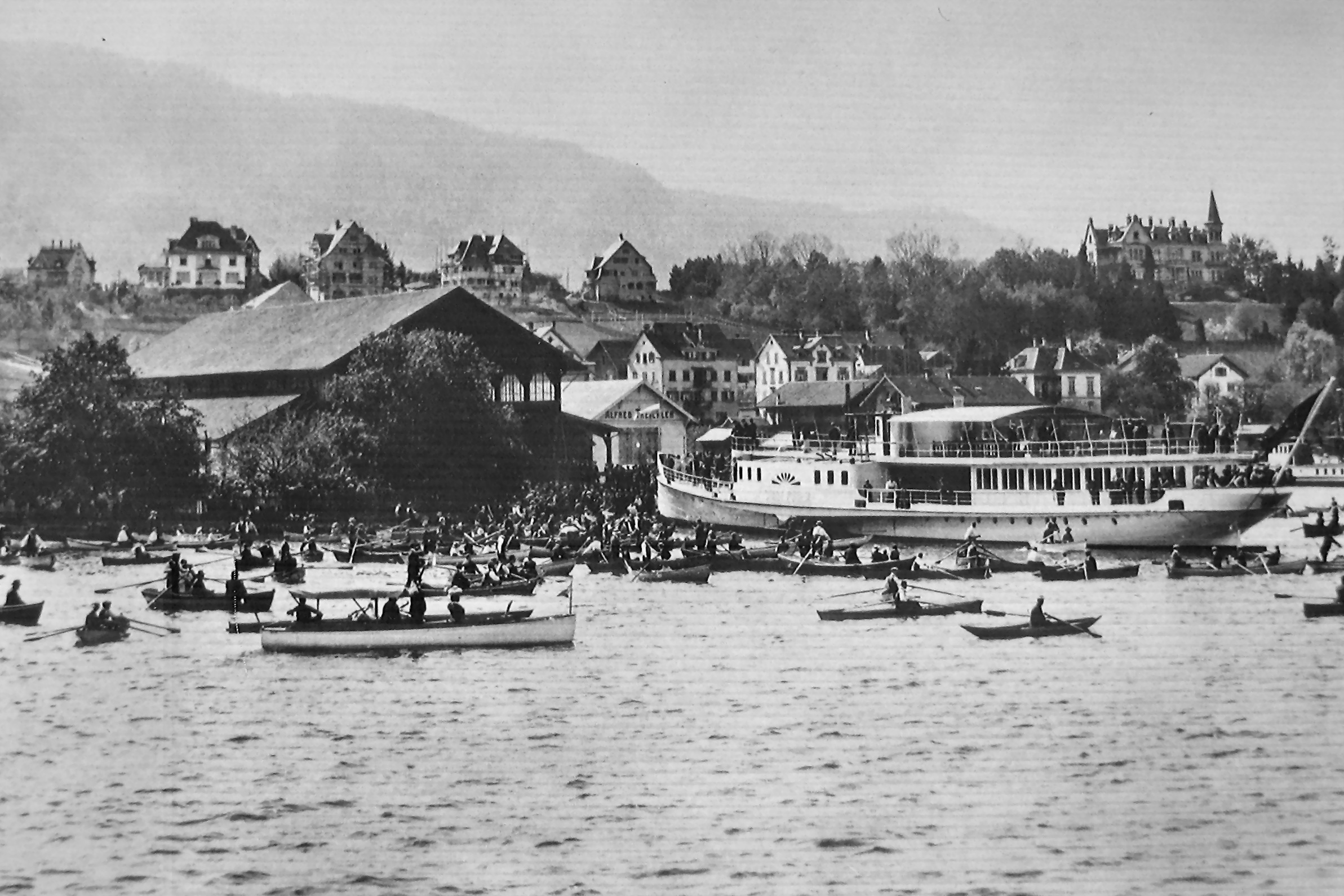
Stadt Zürich in Zürich-Wollishofen in May/June 1909

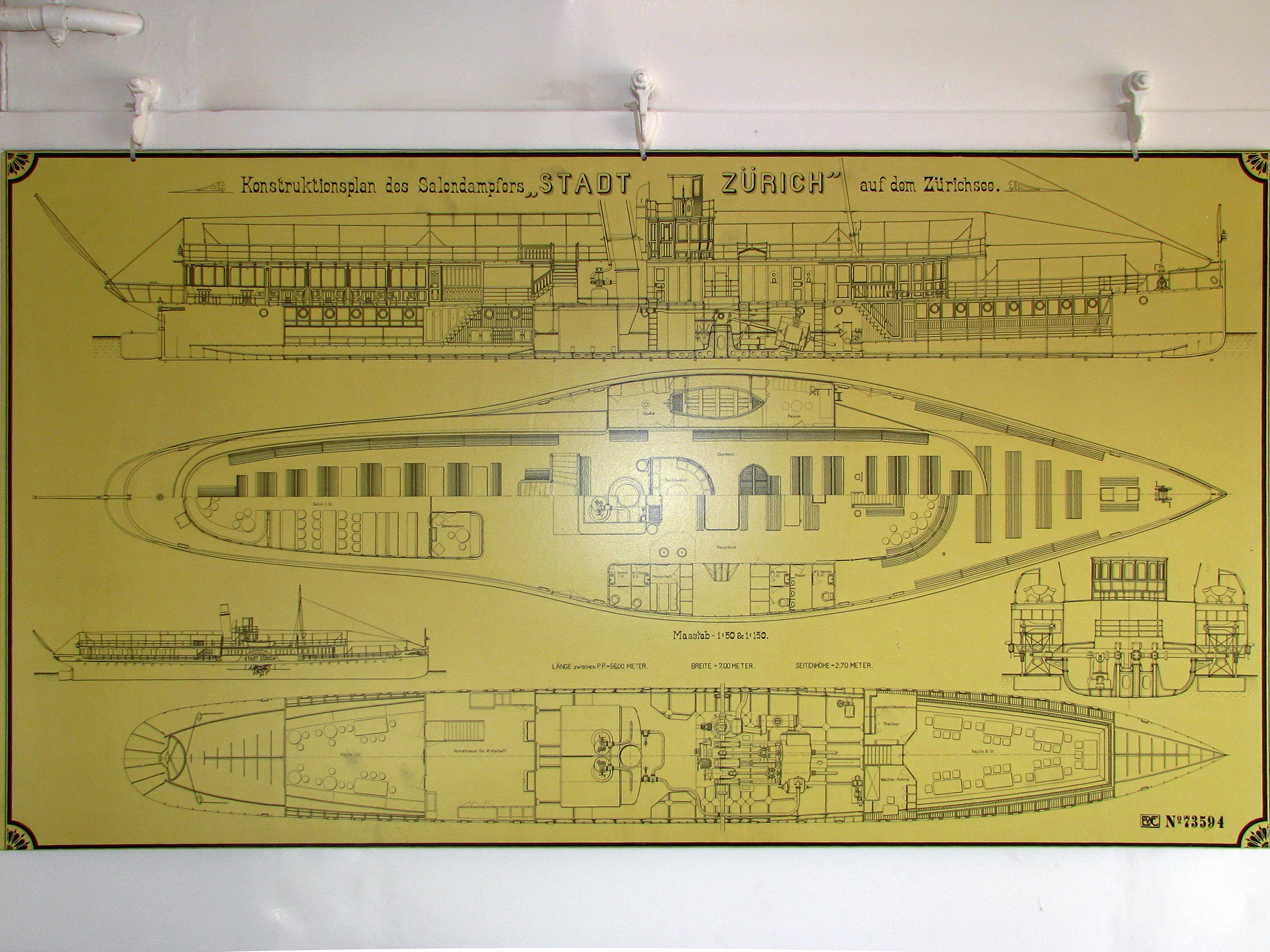
Original plan by Escher, Wyss & Cie.

After a construction period lasting six months, on 8 May 1909 Stadt Zürich had been launched by the daughter of the administration board member Gustave Naville. The acquisition of the new vessel - at a cost of 320,000 Swiss francs - was supported by subsidies of the Swiss government. On Saturday, 12 June 1909, Stadt Zürich started her three-hour maiden voyage at 3 pm, housing members of cantonal and municipal authorities, representatives of Lake Zürich shore communities, of Federal Railways and other traffic institutions, and Escher, Wyss & Cie. and further prominent guests on board. The laudatio was held by Kantonsrat (Zürich's parliament) member Brunner-Vogt, the administrative board's president of the shipping company. In the first year of its operation, the ship sailed 12,575 kilometers and used about 258,450 kilograms of coal.

On 4 September 1912 Stadt Zürich made an evening tour with her by far most famous guest, the German Emperor Wilhelm II, and his blue-blooded retinue and few hand-picked guests. The ship was adorned with flowers and strict dress regulations were given, and tea and German beer were served. In honor of the guest, the municipalities around the lake set off fireworks. The enthusiasm was enormous, and the visit of the emperor left a lasting impression, so that Stadt Zürich was called «the Emperor's ship» for years later. At the last minute, boilerman Jakob Stampfer from Horgen was replaced due to his emperor hostile fundamental attitude - social democrats on this «imperial ship» were unwanted.

On Pentecost 1914, the sister ship Stadt Rapperswil had been put into operational service. The steamboat company then owned – together with Helvetia (built in 1875) and Stadt Zürich – three big ships as the backbone of its fleet. During World War I, ship operations were reduced, and on 2 December 1918 operations even with steamships were stopped by the Swiss Bundesrat (Swiss Federal Council) as Switzerland couldn't import coal. The schedule restrictions were loosened in 1919. For the first time, Stadt Zürich was taken out of the water in the winter of 1919 for maintenance issues (no meaningful defects were found). Between 1922 and 1939 renewals were necessary: Stadt Zürich received new boiler tubes, the roof of the upper deck is replaced, and the paddlewheels. In 1938 the first electric heating was installed.

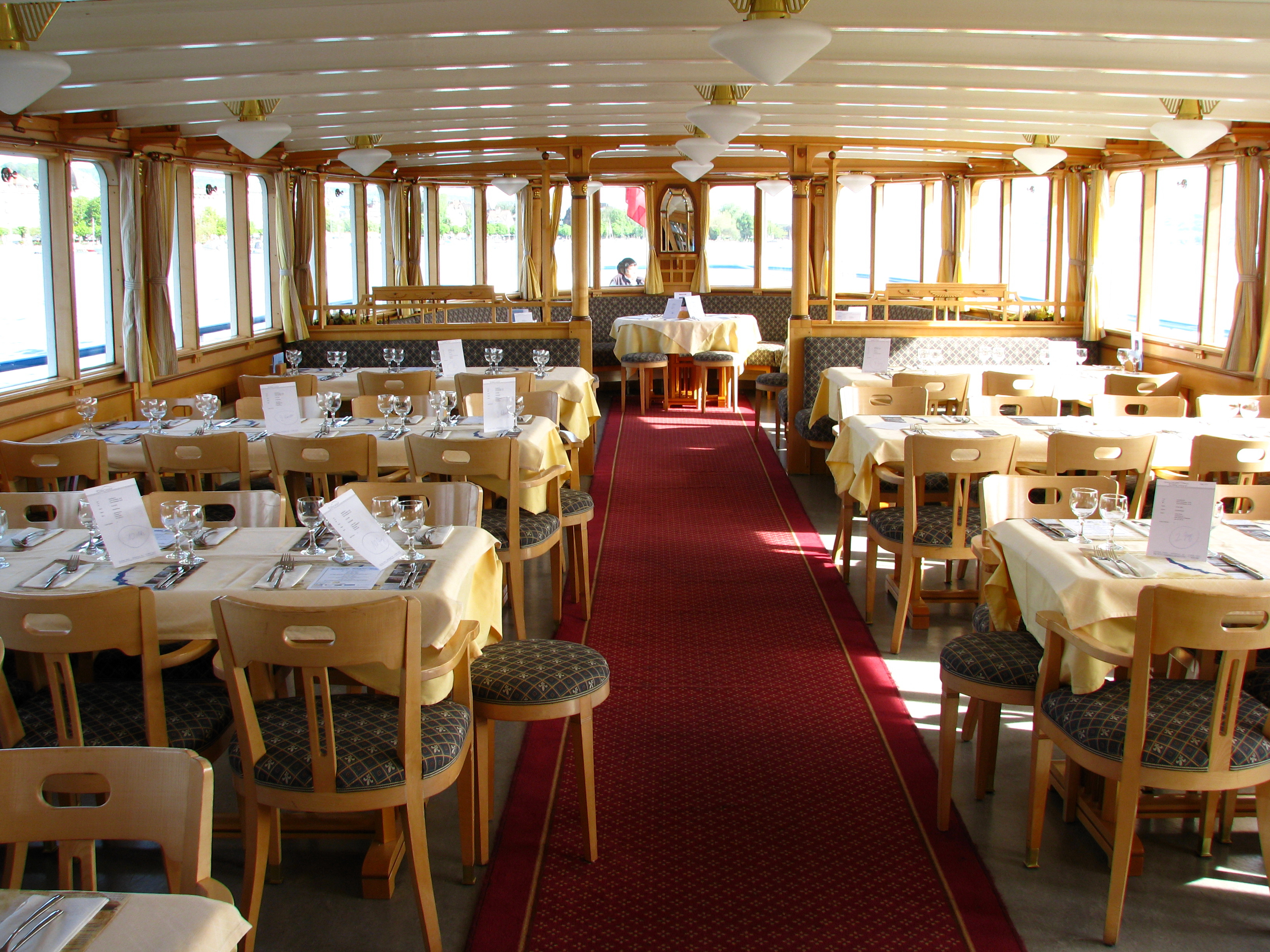
salon

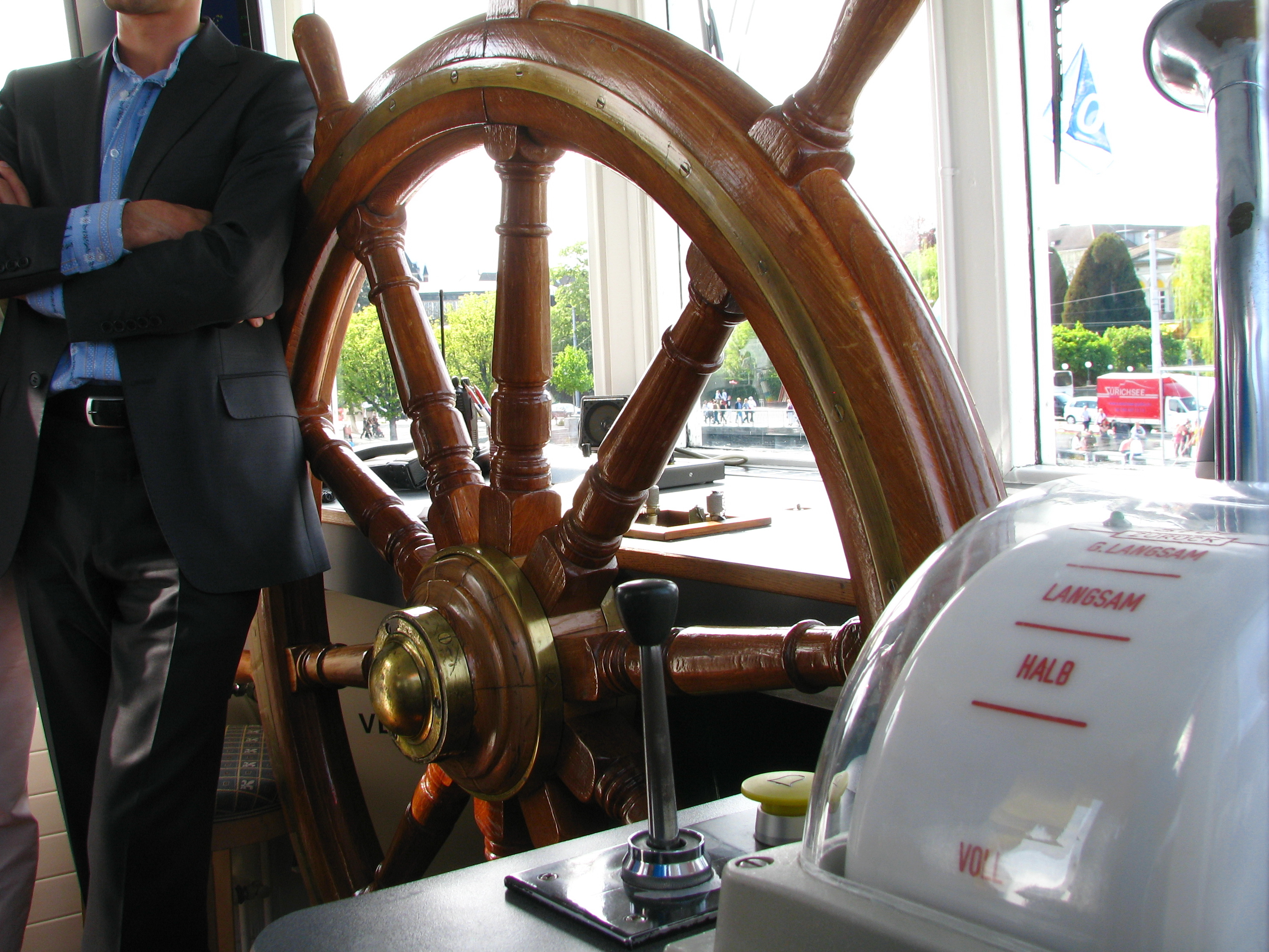
wheelhouse

Beginning World War II, the boiler remained filled with water, and in Winter the plant room was heated to keep the temperature above the freezing point (operationally for military purposes, 24 hours a day). Between the years 1941 and 1953 larger revisions were done: Boiler repairs, extension of the upper deck, and replacement of the sun awning by a solid roof. The coal firing was replaced by a heavy oil firing unit in 1951, allowing machine staff to be reduced (in her early years, Stadt Zürich had a crew of 8). The following general overhaul and rebuilt was done in spring 1956. Unfortunately, the Art Nouveau equipment of the salon also was dismantled and replaced by a simple wood veneer. During restorations of 1989/90 and 2003/04, the ship's interior was returned into its original appearance using historically sourced material, so that a similar room experience is given today. In 1960 and 1967 main revisions in the dock had been done.

In the 1980s, the two remaining paddle steamers on Lake Zürich – Stadt Rapperswil and Stadt Zürich – had been replaced by modern diesel powered ships on daily service; practically they are in service on Sundays, except as of 1986 summer season and again since 2003/4. Urgent repairs to the decks, tail digging trenches disguising, boilers and paddlewheels were made from 1979 to 1981. The rusted paddle boxes were replaced, the day rooms removed and toilets replaced. The paddle steamer received a new water supply and diesel pumps. In the trunk, an additional bulkhead was installed and a hydraulic steering gear. In 1983, the administration board of the ZSG decided preservation of the two remaining steamships. «150 years steam navigation on the Lake Zürich» were celebrated with various activities in 1985. In winter 1989/90, Stadt Zürich was improved to the same technical niveau as her sister ship Stadt Rapperswil: The two old steam-boilers were replaced by a new one, her wooden deck is replaced to 70%, and the wooden stairs to the 1st class were refurbished. Additionally, the salon and the smoke stack were restored to their original appearances. The renovation cost three million Swiss francs of public money; «Aktion pro Raddampfer» association paid 200,000 Swiss Francs by private donations. On 21 June 1990 Stadt Zürich resumed her tourist service.

In 2001 the project «Mit Volldampf voraus» (full steam ahead) was started. The two paddle steamships were equipped with improved comfort, once again. A collection campaign was started for the renewal of the salon steamers. One year later, on «Tag der Schweizer Schifffahrt» (Swiss navigation day), in co-operation with the «Action pro Raddampfer». Revisions started in November 2003: Sewage and power supply, refrigeration plants, diesel engine and heating were replaced. A new kitchen was installed, improved glazing protects the passengers on the upper deck, so that the steamer can be used in all weather. The instep linoleum-carpet in the salon is replaced by a discreetly gray one and the aisle is provided with a beautiful runner. The salon was restored largely to its original condition. The steamer's renovation costs 1,7 million Swiss francs – Stadt Zürich returned to operation on 25 May 2004. By her 100th anniversary, Stadt Zürich had steamed more than 700,000 kilometers.

== Incidents involving Stadt Zürich ==
On 25 May 1922 the subengineer was killed in a manoeuvre with the steam-driven engine. A passenger died on 7 September 1924, falling backward into the water. During a test run, Stadt Zürich collided with a landing stage on 18 October 1926, badly damaging her hull, and in summer 1939, paddles on the port side wheel were damaged in Horgen. In 1949 the port side paddle wheel broke. In the same year, the salon steamer sank a police boat which was unable to make way due to a defect. On 4 May 1985, due to a technical defect the Stadt Zürich rammed a wall at the footbridge in Zürich: nobody was injured but the steamer's bow was holed and had to be repaired in ZSG's shipyard in Wollishofen. Approaching Rapperswil, the ship grounded on 22 May 2005, causing repairs lasting two weeks. In 2008 landing at Zürich-Bürkliplatz, Stadt Zürich hit the quay but was able to continue its activities normally.

== 100th birthday of Stadt Zürich ==
On 23/25 April 2009 there was a centennial exhibition on board Stadt Zürich at Bürkliplatz. On 12 June 2009, exactly 100 years after the maiden voyage of the steamship Stadt Zürich, its anniversary trip with invited guests and its sistership Stadt Rapperswil was celebrated.

== Cultural heritage of national importance ==
Dampfschiff Stadt Zürich is listed in the Swiss inventory of cultural property of national and regional significance as a Class A object of national importance.
