= ZSG =

Public Swiss company

Zürichsee-Schifffahrtsgesellschaft AG
- Company type: S.A.
- Industry: Transport
- Founded: 1890/91
- Headquarters: Zurich, Switzerland
- Area served: Lake Zürich
- Website: http://www.zsg.ch/

The Lake Zurich Navigation Company (German: Zürichsee-Schifffahrtsgesellschaft, ZSG) is a public Swiss company operating passenger ships and boats on Lake Zurich (Zürichsee) and the river Limmat in Zurich.The company's services connect lake-side towns between Zurich and Rapperswil/Schmerikon, in the cantons of Zurich, Schwyz and St. Gallen, as well as more tourist-oriented river cruises and boat services through the historic centre of the city of Zurich.

It is a member of the Zurich Public Transport Network (Zürcher Verkehrsverbund, ZVV) and transports over 1.5 million passengers every year.

The ZSG is a joint stock company with a share capital of 11 million Swiss Francs (CHF). The share capital – one third is in private hands – is divided into 110,000 bearer shares, each with a nominal value of CHF 100.

== History ==
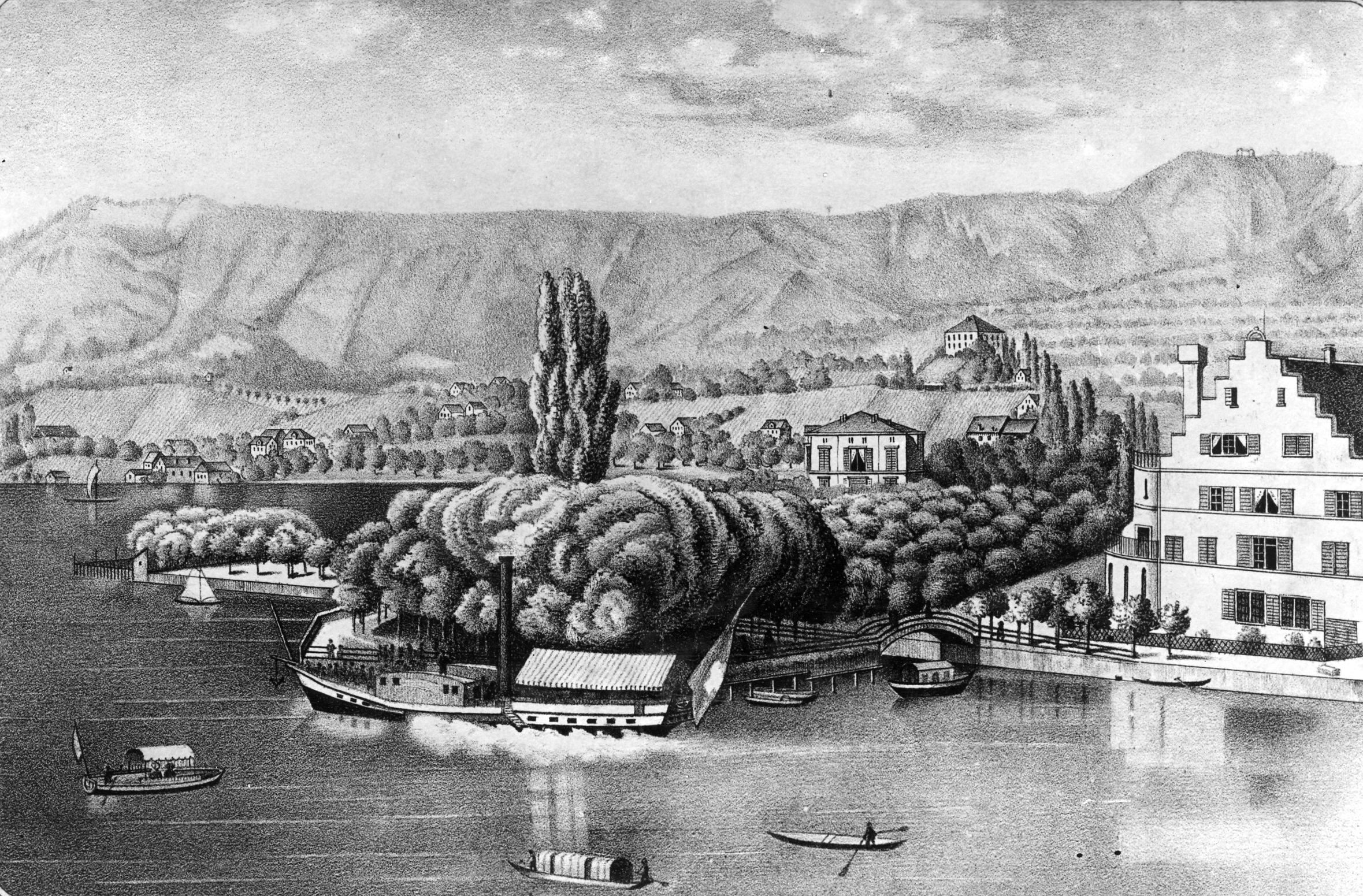
The first touristic Steamship gate (1835-1883) at Bauschänzli in Zürich

Steam navigation started on Lake Zurich in 1834, when Franz Carl Caspar and Johann Jakob Lämmlin founded a new company (Caspar und Lämmlin, Unternehmer der Dampfschiffahrt auf dem Zürcher- und Walensee) and ordered their first ship from William Fairbairn of Manchester, England. The Minerva entered service the following year. When the city fortifications were abolished, the then called Bauschänzli bastion remained intact, and served from 1835 to 1883 as the landing site for the first steamboats on the lake, later provided by the Zürichsee-Schifffahrtsgesellschaft.

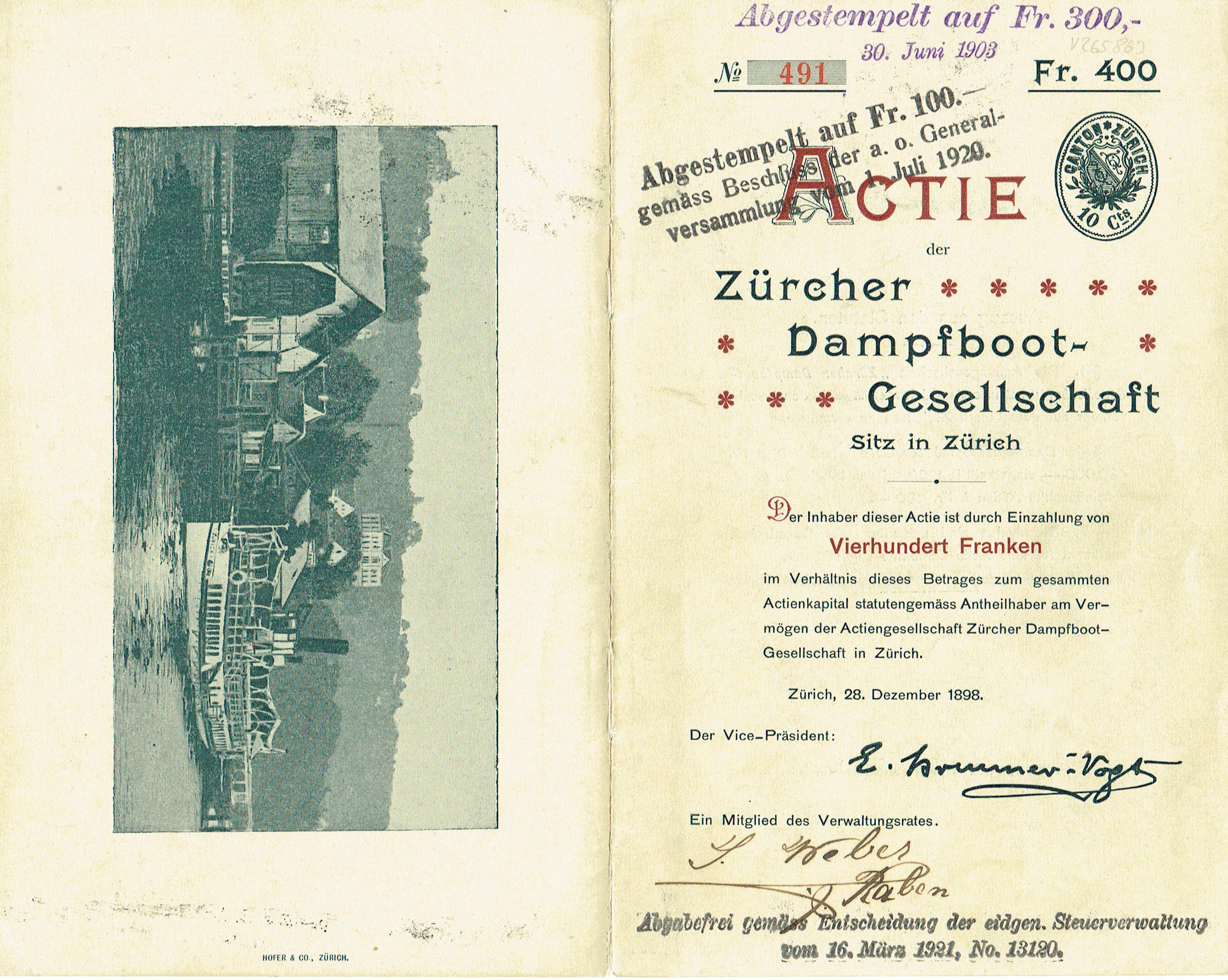
Share of the Zürcher Dampfboot-Gesellschaft, issued 28. December 1898

Over the years, various other companies started operating steam ships on the lake, and various mergers took place, until the entire fleet was taken over by the Swiss Northeastern Railway (NOB) in 1874. The NOB also owned most of the railway network around the lake, and this monopoly led to consumer resistance, and to the formation of the Zürcher Dampfbootgesellschaft (lit. 'Zurich Steamship Company') in 1890/91. In order to operate a tram-like suburban traffic, a series of nine screw steamships was ordered.

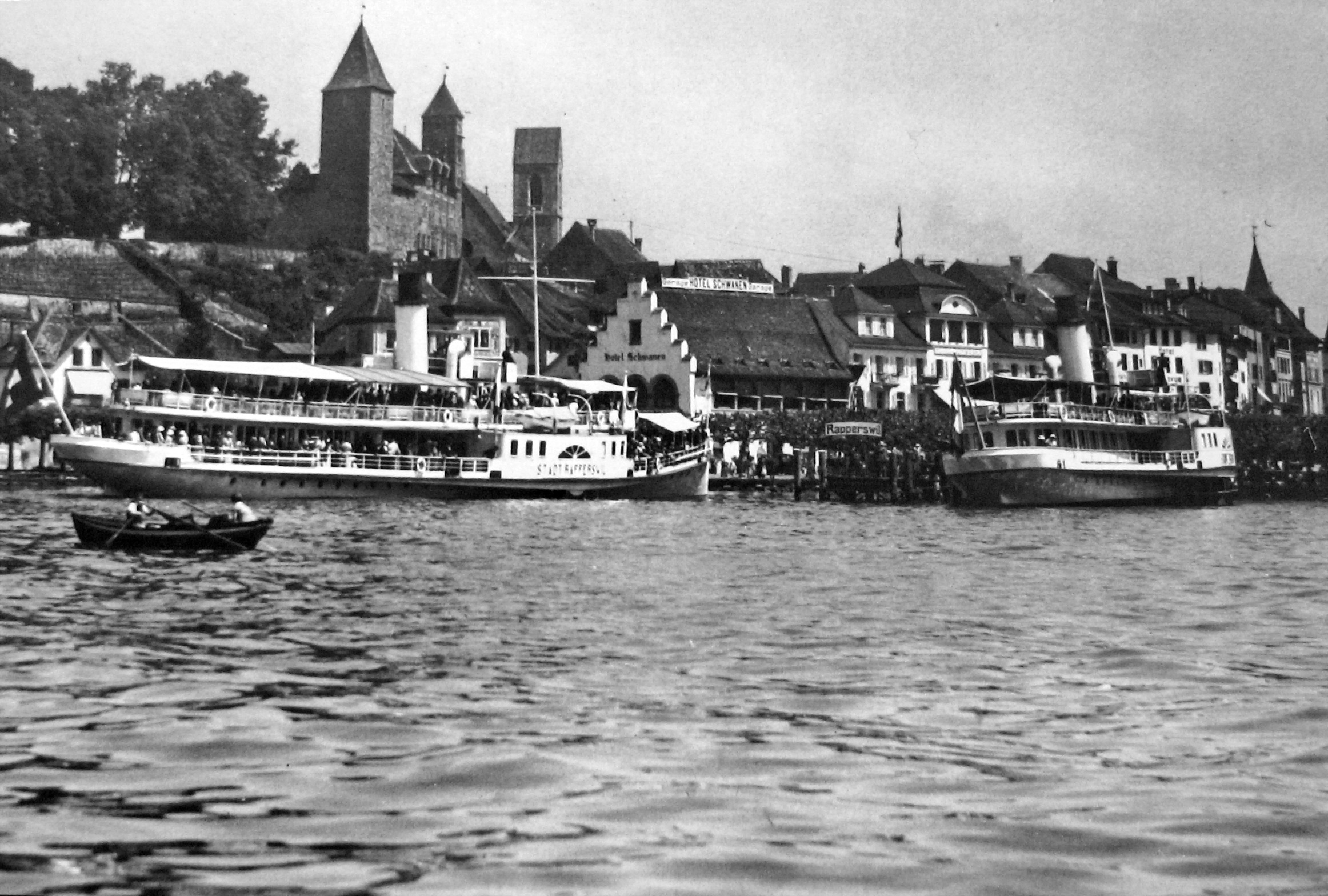
Paddle steamships Stadt Rapperswil (to the left) and Stadt Zürich in Rapperswil harbour (estimated to be in May 1914)

When the NOB became part of the Swiss Federal Railways in 1903, the Zürcher Dampfbootgesellschaft took over its fleet of ships on Lake Zurich. This included the large paddle steamer Helvetia. In 1909 and 1914, it ordered two further large paddle steamers, which were to become today's Stadt Zürich and Stadt Rapperswil respectively. In 1934 the Zürcher Dampfbootgesellschaft introduced its first successful motor ship, the Etzel, and from then on the fleet became increasingly motorized.

For the Swiss National Exhibition of 1939, four sister motor ships named after water birds, the Taucherli (Eurasian coot), Schwan (Swan), Möve (gull) and Ente (duck), were brought into service. These vessels provided a connecting service between the two exhibition sites, at Wollishofen and Zürichhorn. The Second World War brought economic difficulties, but the cross-lake services were maintained. As a consequence of the transition from steam power to motor vessels, the company changed its name to Zürichsee Schifffahrtgesellschaft, or ZSG for short, in 1957.

In 1990, the ZSG became part of the Zürcher Verkehrsverbund (ZVV), the public transport network established in the same year, accepting the ZVVs common tickets and tariffs.

In 2009 there was a centennial exhibition on board Stadt Zürich at Zürich-Bürkliplatz. On 12 June 2009, exactly 100 years after the maiden voyage of the steamship Stadt Zürich, its anniversary trip with invited guests and its sistership Stadt Rapperswil was celebrated., and in 2014 for its then 100 years aged sistership.

== Fleet ==
=== Current fleet ===
A fleet of 17 passenger ships, including two historical paddle steamers – Stadt Zürich (built in 1909) and Stadt Rapperwil (1914) – and 15 motor vessels of various sizes is operated by the Zürichsee-Schifffahrtsgesellschaft. ZSG's flagship MS Helvetia has a capacity of 1200 passengers. The fleet includes three small Limmat boats for round trips on the Limmat and on the lower Lake Zurich at Zurich.

Name	Type	Built in	Passengers	Builder	Engine	Named after	Image
Stadt Zürich	Paddle steamer	1909	750	Escher Wyss & Cie.	368 kW (Escher Wyss)	The city of Zurich	
Stadt Rapperswil	Paddle steamer	1914	750	Escher Wyss & Cie.	368 kW (Escher Wyss)	The city of Rapperswil	
Helvetia	Motor ship	1964	1200	Bodan-Werft GmbH	635 kW (MAN)	Helvetia, the national personification of Switzerland	
Linth	Motor ship	1952	1000	Bodan-Werft GmbH	730 kW (2×365, MAN	The Linth, a river that feeds Lake Zurich)	
Limmat	Motor ship	1958	850	Bodan-Werft GmbH	485 kW (MAN)	The Limmat, the outfall river of Lake Zurich	
Wädenswil	Motor ship	1968	700	Bodan-Werft GmbH	442 kW (MAN)	Wädenswil, a town on Lake Zurich	
Panta Rhei	Motor ship	2007	700	ÖSWAG	884 kW (2×442, MAN)	Everything Flows in Ancient Greek	
Säntis	Motor ship	1957	300	Bodan-Werft GmbH / ZSG	440 kW (MAN)	Säntis, a Swiss mountain	
Albis	Motor ship	1997	300	Bodan-Werft GmbH	500 kW (2×250, MAN)	Albis, a range of hills near Zurich	
Pfannenstiel	Motor ship	1998	300	Bodan-Werft GmbH	500 kW (2×250, MAN)	Pfannenstiel, a mountain overlooking Lake Zurich	
Uetliberg	Motor ship	1999	300	Bodan-Werft GmbH	500 kW (2×250, MAN)	Uetliberg, a mountain overlooking Zurich	
Bachtel	Motor ship	1962	250	Bodan-Werft GmbH	250 kW (MAN)	The Bachtel Tower overlooking Lake Zurich	
Zimmerberg	Motor ship	2001	150	Bodan-Werft GmbH	294 kW (2×147, MAN)	Zimmerberg, a mountain overlooking Lake Zurich	
Forch	Motor ship	2001	150	Bodan-Werft GmbH	294 kW (2×147, MAN)	Forch, a village near Zurich	
Turicum	Limmat boat	1992	51	Bodan-Werft GmbH	116 kW (2×58, MWM)	An early name for Zurich	
Felix	Limmat boat	1993	51	Bodan-Werft GmbH	116 kW (2×58, MWM)	Felix, one of Zurich's patron saints	
Regula	Limmat boat	1993	51	Bodan-Werft GmbH	116 kW (2×58, MWM)	Regula, another of Zurich's patron saints	

=== Former fleet ===
The paddle steamer Helvetia, built in 1875 and last operated in 1958, was scrapped in 1964. Of the four so-called Landi-Boote built for the Swiss national exposition (Landi) of 1939, Ente was sold to the BLS after the exhibition, whilst Schwan (renamed Halbinsel Au), Möve and Taucherli (renamed Speer) continued in service until the end of the 1990s, when they were replaced by three motor ships (300 passengers each) of the Albis type – Albis, Pfannenstiel and Uetliberg – in addition to two smaller (150 passengers each) motor ships – Zimmerberg and Forch.

Name	Type	Built in	Passengers	Builder	Engine	Decommissioned	Named after	Image
Helvetia	Paddle steamer	1875	1200	Escher Wyss & Cie.	480 PS (Escher Wyss)	1958, scrapped and scuttled in 1964	Helvetia, the national personification of Switzerland	
Etzel	Motor ship	1934	150	Escher Wyss & Cie.		2001, now used by the Etzel society	Etzel, a mountain overlooking Lake Zurich	
Ente	Motor ship	1939		Escher Wyss & Cie.		1940, sold to BLS for service on Lake Thun, renamed Oberhofen		
Halbinsel Au (ex Schwan)	Motor ship	1939	200	Escher Wyss & Cie.		Moved to Amsterdam, renamed Euro	The Au peninsula in Lake Zurich	
Möve	Motor ship	1939	200	Escher Wyss & Cie.		Moved to Brussels, renamed Gueuse2021, moved to Antwerp, renamed Sterna	Sterna, Italian for the bird Stern but also the Stern. Stern is part of the family of the seagull, and thus the original name 'Möve'	
Speer (ex Taucherli)	Motor ship	1939	200	Escher Wyss & Cie.		Moved to the IJsselmeer, renamed Elvira	Speer, a mountain overlooking Lake Zurich	
Ufenau	Motor ship	1977		Bodan-Werft GmbH		2001, now used as Davidoff by Hensa AG at Rapperswil	Ufenau, an island in Lake Zurich	
Glärnisch	Motor ship	1955		Escher Wyss & Cie.		since 2007 serving as Restaurant ship in Wädenswil	Glärnisch, a Swiss mountain	
Stäfa	Motor ship			Escher Wyss & Cie.		serving as Restaurant ship for the community center Zürich-Wollishofen	Stäfa, a town on the banks of Lake Zurich	

== Operations ==
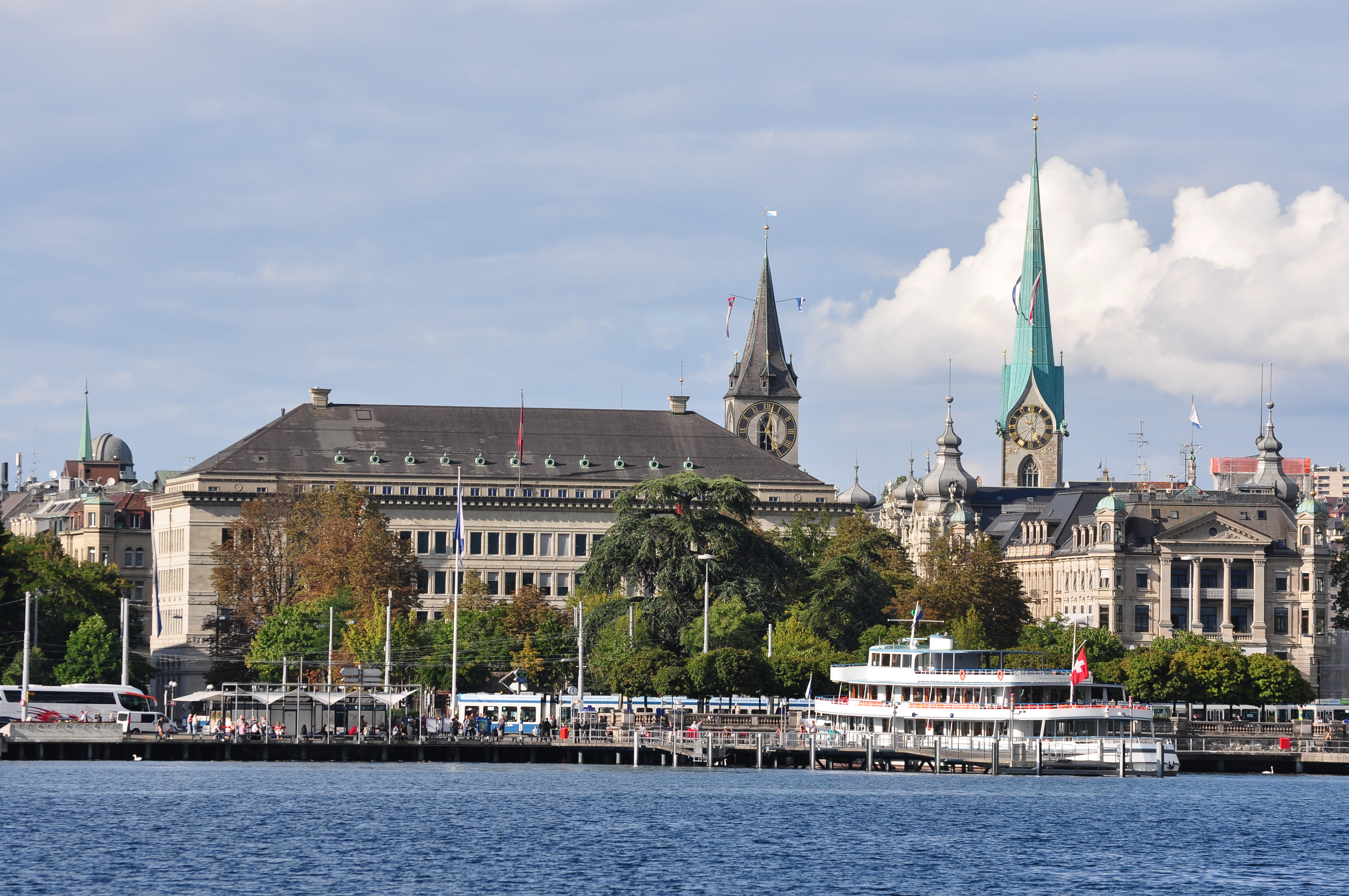
Zürich-Bürkliplatz landing gate

The ZSG operates regular round trips from its main Zurich landing point at Bürkliplatz. In summer, trips taking 4 hours operate every hour and stop on both shores of the lower lake at Zürichhorn, Wollishofen, Kilchberg-Bendlikon, Küsnacht-Heslibach, Küsnacht, Zollikon, Meilen, Herrliberg, Rüschlikon, Thalwil, Erlenbach, Oberrieden, Horgen, Au peninsula, Wädenswil, Richterswil, Stäfa, Männedorf, Ufenau island and Rapperswil. A few trips continue through the Hurden ship canal to the upper lake, or Obersee, calling at Altendorf, Lachen and Schmerikon, and take 7 hours.

There also are shorter round trips from Zürich-Bürkliplatz, with 2.5 hour trips as far as Richterswil or Stäfa, and 1.5 hour trips to Erlenbach and Thalwil.

The company also operates services on the Limmat through the centre of Zurich. These services operate upriver from the Landesmuseum via Limmatquai and Storchen to Lake Zurich, stopping at Bürkliplatz, Enge and Zürichhorn, before returning downriver to the Landesmuseum. Because of the low bridges over the Limmat in central Zurich, these services use low profile motor boats.

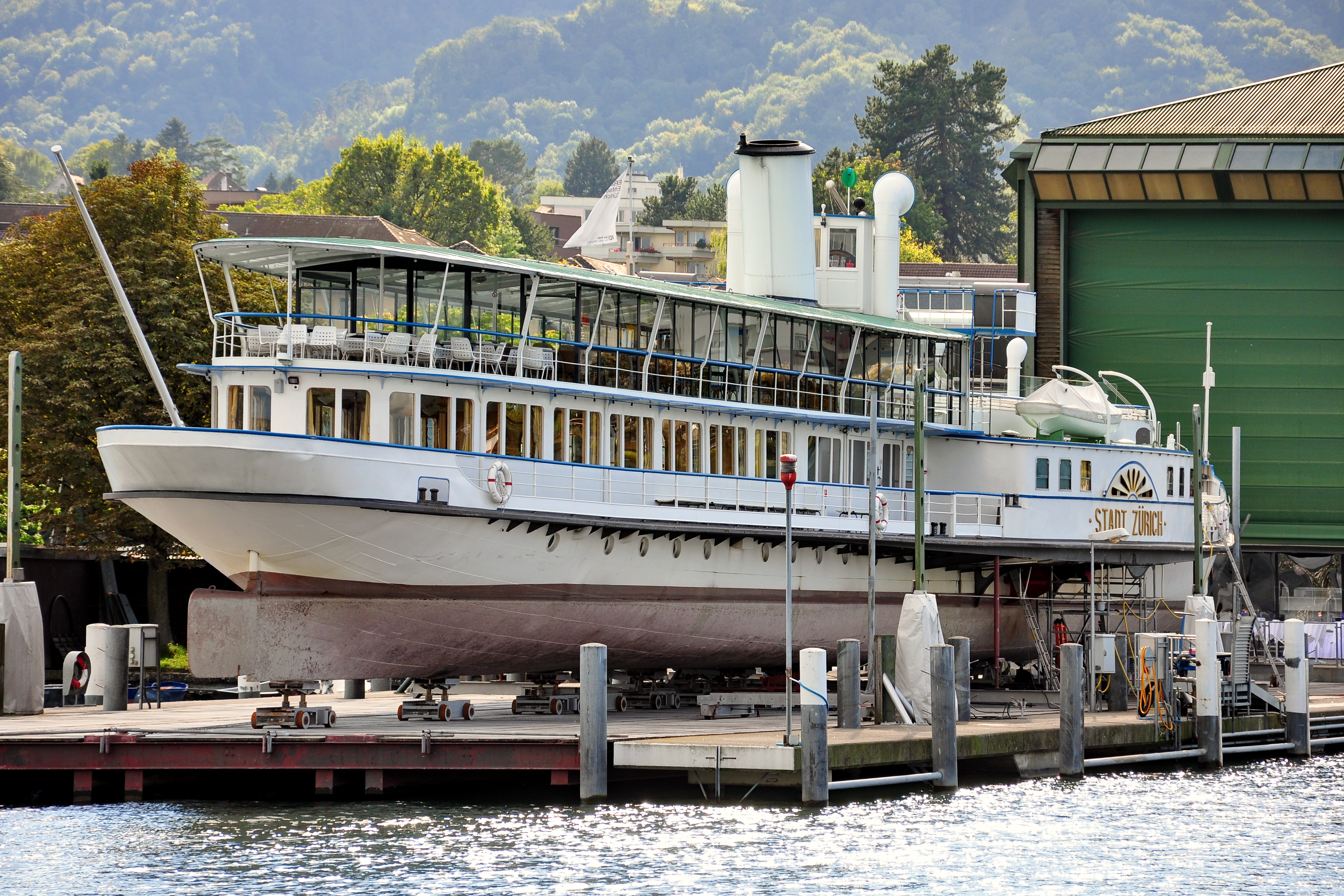
A view of the Stadt Zürich on the ship lift at the Wollishofen ship yard.

The ZSG employs approximatively 80 permanent members of staff, and in the main summer season (April–December) five additional nautical seasonal workers, as well as seven staff in the ticket office at Zürich-Bürkliplatz. In its own ship yard at Zürich-Wollishofen work qualified carpenters, painters, mechanics, electricians, plumbers and locksmiths.

== See also ==
- Zürichsee-Fähre Horgen–Meilen, the main car ferry operator on Lake Zurich
- Transport in Switzerland
- Public transport in Zurich
- ZVV fare zones
- List of lakes of Switzerland
