= Bodan-Werft =

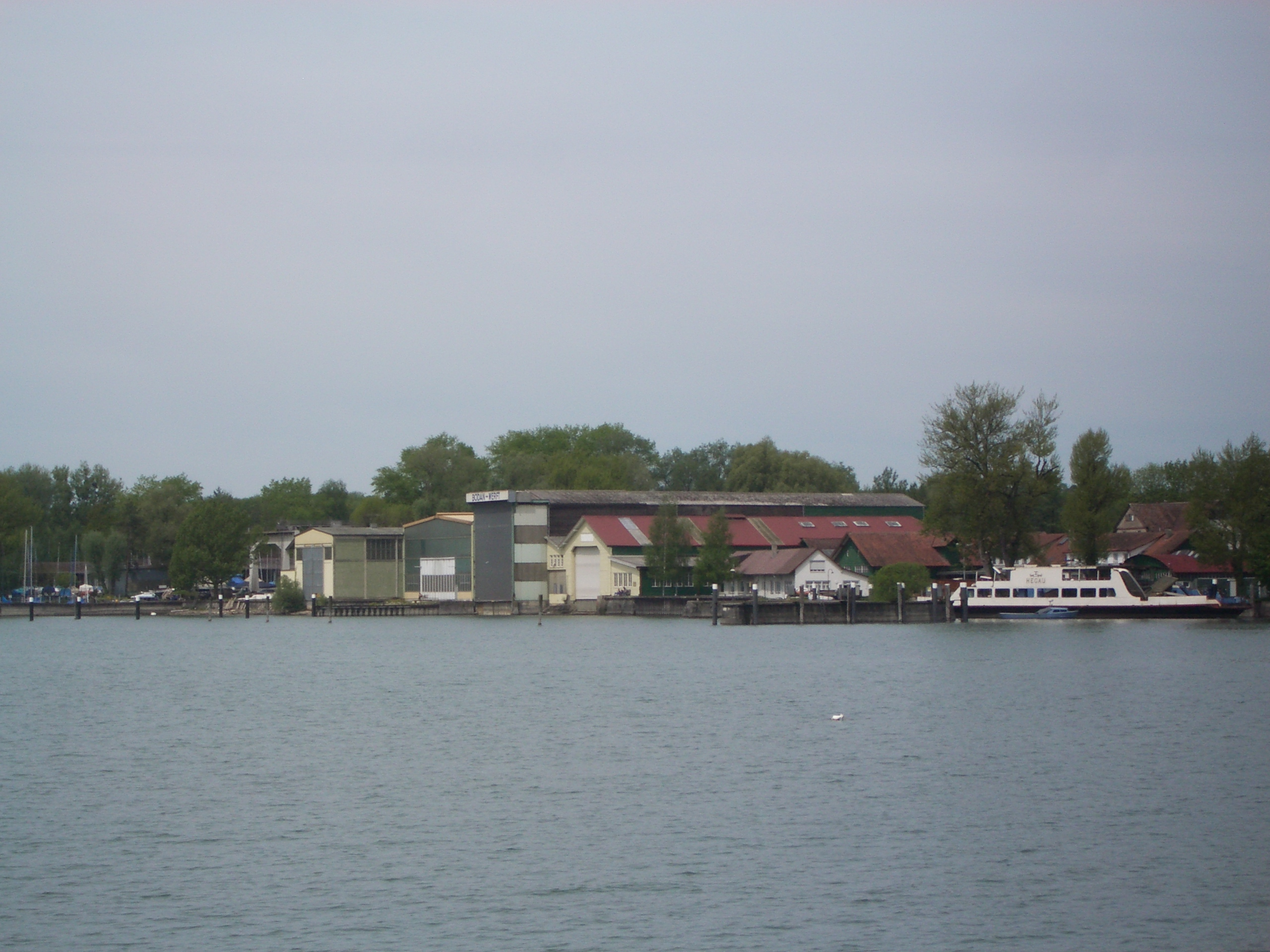
The shipyard

Boden-Werft GmbH is a German company, and a former shipyard, located in the port of Kressbronn on Lake Constance. The company was founded in 1919 as a shipyard, but the shipyard business was wound-up in 2011. The shipyard diversified into the building of swimming pools, and into operating a yacht harbour adjacent to the shipyard. These businesses still exist under the names Bodan Schwimmbadbau and Bodan Freizeit & Hafen.

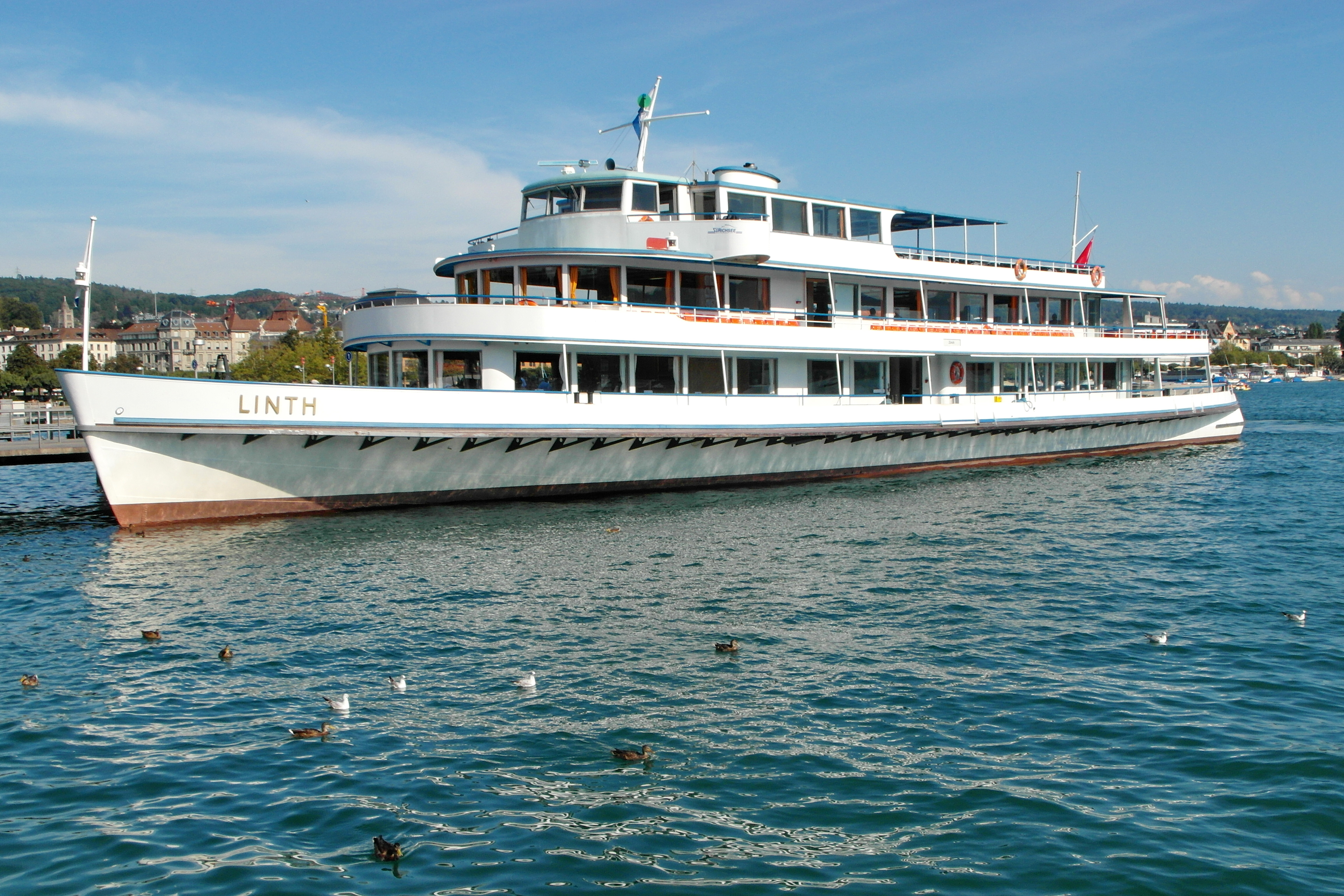
MS Linth, built by Bodan-Werft in 1952 for service on Lake Zurich

The company built many of the ferries and other vessels used on the larger lakes of the Alps, including vessels for the White Fleet on Lake Constance, for the Zürichsee-Schifffahrtsgesellschaft and the Zürichsee-Fähre Horgen–Meilen on Lake Zurich, and for the Società Navigazione del Lago di Lugano on Lake Lugano.

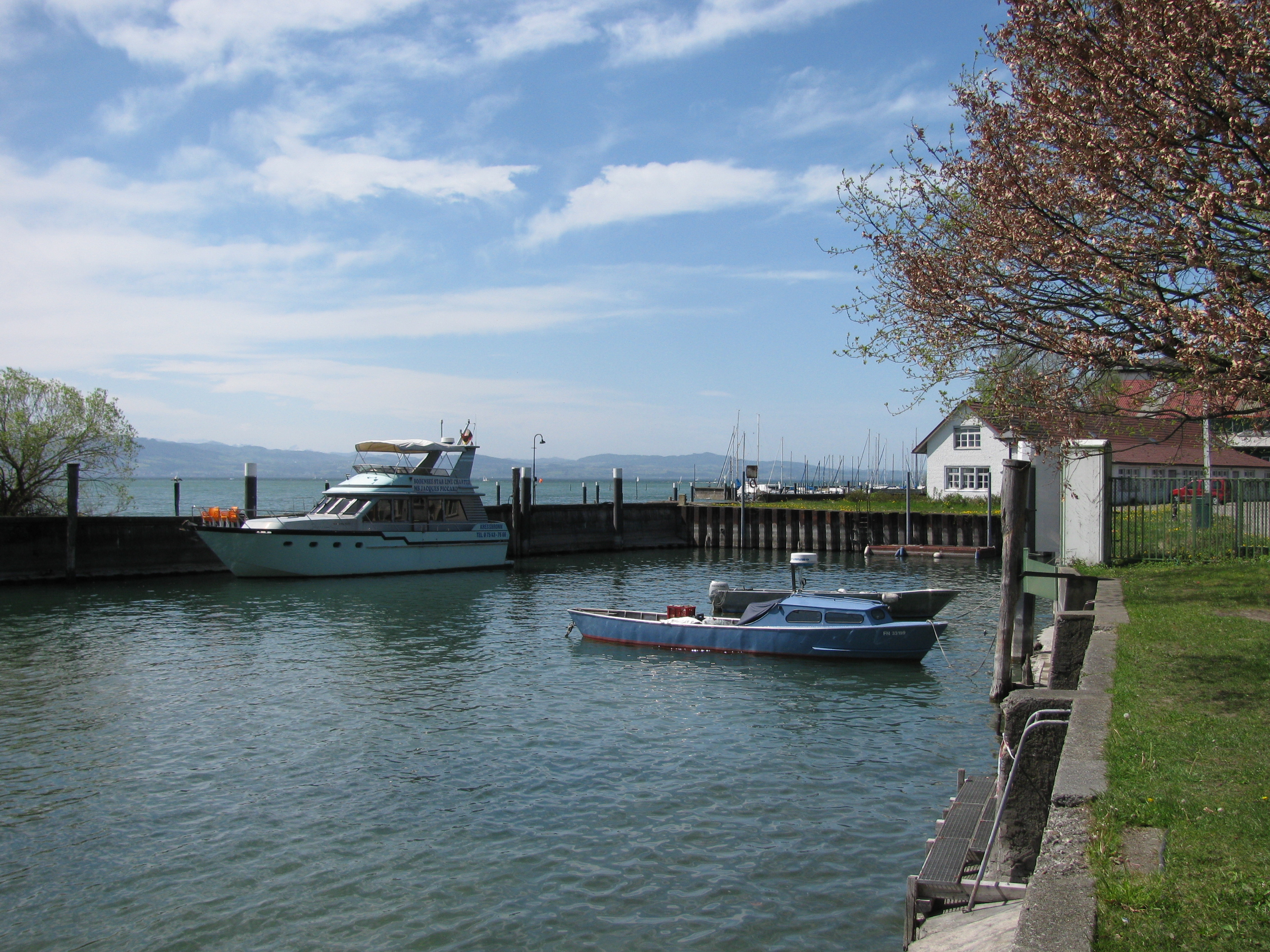
Part of the yacht harbour

There are plans to redevelop the shipyard for residential purposes.
