= Stadt Rapperswil =

Swiss steamship on Lake Zurich

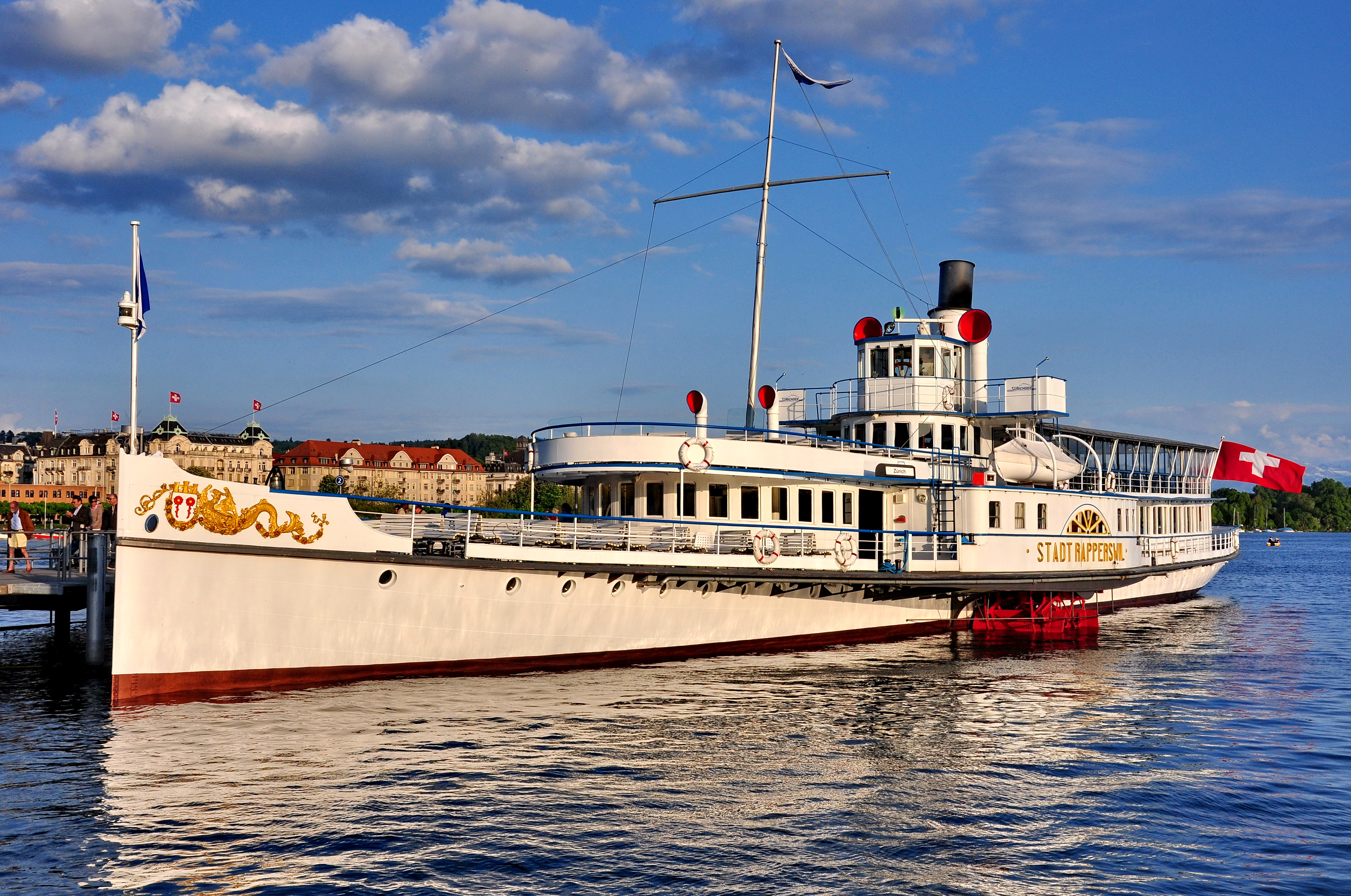
- Stadt Rapperswil in 2009

History

Switzerland
- Name: Stadt Rapperswil
- Namesake: Rapperswil (SG)
- Operator: Zürichsee-Schifffahrtsgesellschaft
- Route: Zürich-Rapperswil-Zürich
- Builder: Escher, Wyss & Cie.
- Launched: May 29, 1914
- Home port: Zürich-Wollishofen
- Status: in service

General characteristics
- Class & type: Steamboat
- Type: Paddle steamer
- Displacement: 260 tonnes
- Length: 59.10 m
- Beam: 13.50 m
- Draught: 7.00 m
- Installed power: 365 kW (500 PS)
- Propulsion: compound steam engine; 2 cylinders; 57 rpm at max. 13 bar
- Speed: 27 km/h (15 kn)
- Boats & landing craft carried: 2
- Capacity: 750
- Crew: 6
- Sensors & processing systems: Radar, Echo sounding, GPS

The Paddle steamship Stadt Rapperswil is the younger of the two remaining steam paddle ships on Lake Zürich. Stadt Rapperswil was built in 1914 by Escher, Wyss & Cie. in Zürich for the Zürichsee-Schifffahrtsgesellschaft. In contrast to most other Swiss paddle steamers, the most striking features of this vessel and its sister ship Stadt Zürich (1909) are a short smoke stack, and a spacious 1st class upper deck. The sister ships differ externally only minimally: In front, Stadt Rapperswil has a crossed flag mast. Her 1st class is more luxurious than her sister ship's, recognizable by mahogany and pear tree panelling, and an elaborate staircase to the upper 1st class deck.

== History ==
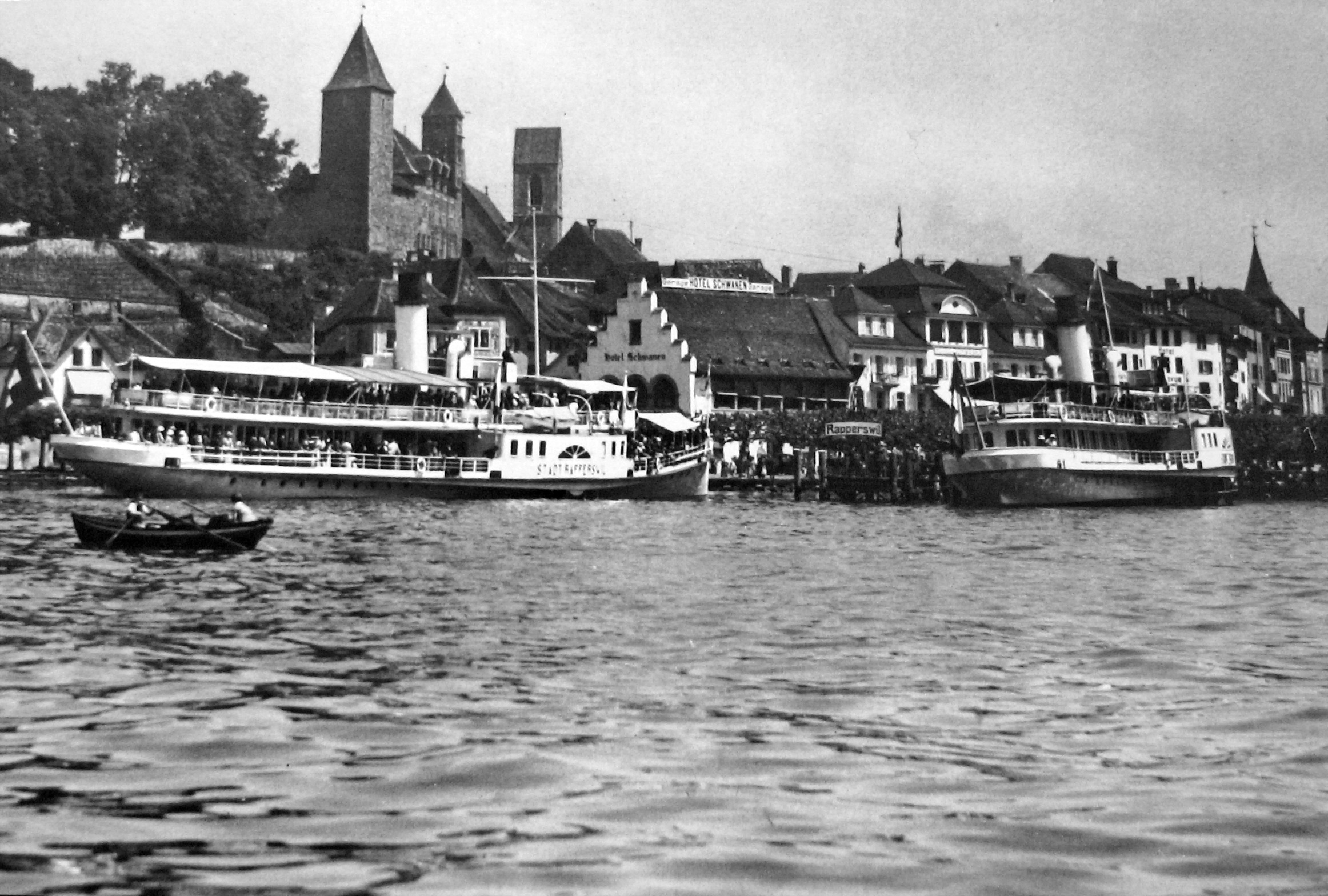
ZSG paddle steamships Stadt Rapperswil (to the left) and Stadt Zürich in Rapperswil harbour (estimated to be in May 1914)

On May 29, 1914, Stadt Rapperswil started her maiden voyage, housing members of cantonal and municipal authorities, representatives of Lake Zürich shore communities, and Escher, Wyss & Cie. and further prominent guests on board.. The acquisition of the new vessel was supported by subsidies of the Swiss government. The Zürcher Dampfbootgesellschaft (ZDG) then owned – together with Helvetia (built in 1875) and Stadt Zürich – three big ships as backbone of its fleet. During World War I, ship operations were reduced, and on December 2, 1918, operations even with steamships were stopped by the Swiss Bundesrat (Swiss Federal Council) as Switzerland couldn't import coal. The schedule restrictions were loosened in 1919. Beginning World War II, the boiler stayed filled with water, and in Winter the plant room was heated to keep the temperature above the freezing point (operationally for military purposes for 24 hours).

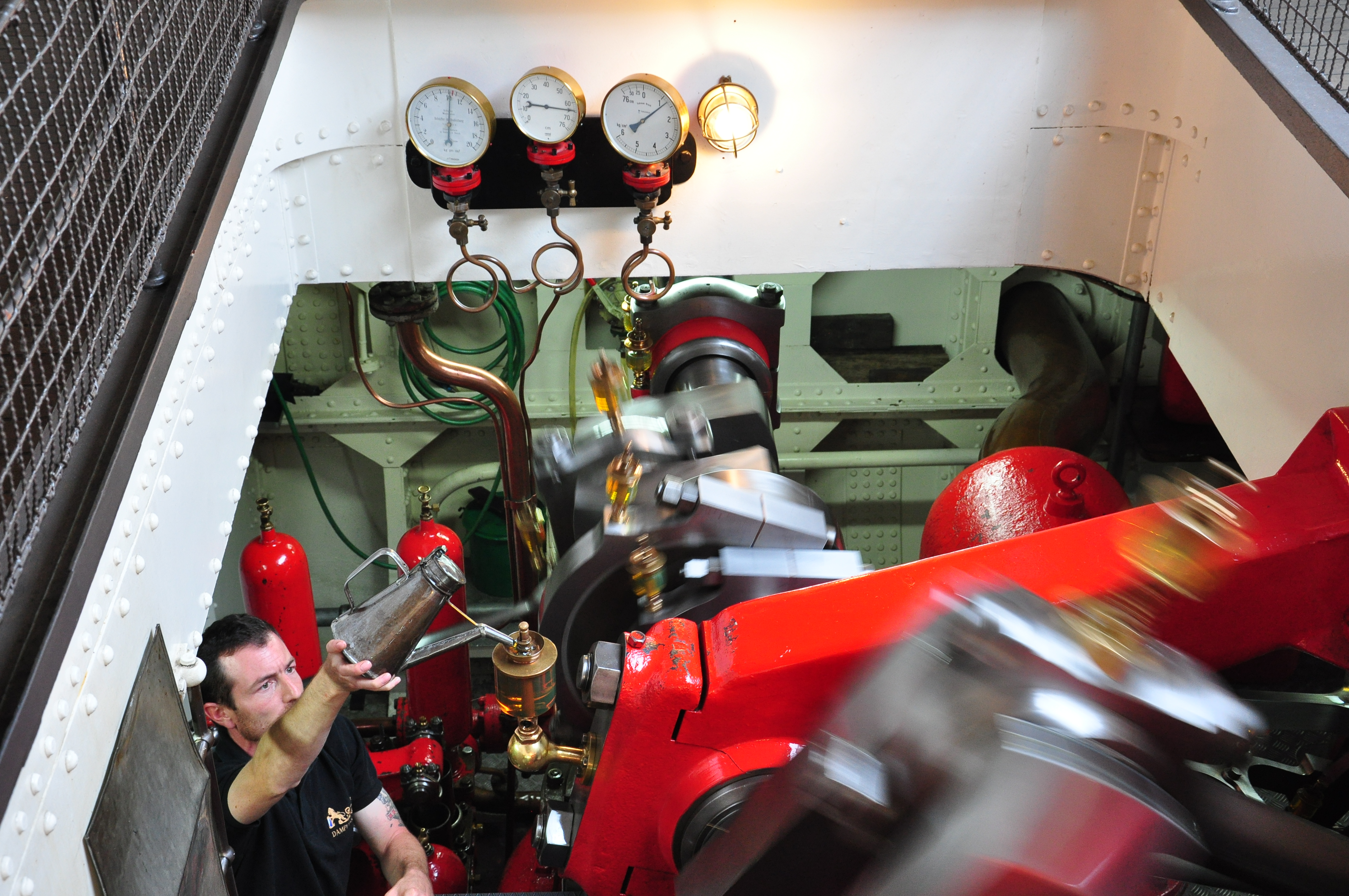
Steam ship engine ZSG Stadt Rapperswil, built in 1914 by Escher & Wyss at Bürkliplatz in Zürich

In 1950/51, Stadt Zürich and Stadt Rapperswil went under a refit, where their steam machinery was replaced with diesel engines. In beginning 1970's, it was planned to take the steamship out of service: The two remaining paddle steamers on Lake Zürich – Stadt Rapperswil and Stadt Zürich – had been replaced by modern motor ships on daily service; practically they are in service on Sundays, except as of 1986 summer season and again since 2003/4. In 1983, the administrative board of the ZSG decides preservation of the two remaining steamships. «150 years steam navigation on the Lake Zürich» are celebrated with different activities in 1985, and Stadt Rapperswil was improved in Winter 1989/90: The old steam-boilers have been replaced by a new one, her technical equipment improved, her wooden deck and the wooden stairs to the 1st class have been refurbished. Moreover, the salon and the smoke cubicle have been restored into their original appearances. The renovation has been financed by the public hand; by the «Aktion pro Raddampfer» association and by private donations.

In 2001, the project «Mit Volldampf voraus» (full steam ahead) was initiated. The two paddle steamships were equipped with improved comfort, once again. A collection campaign was started for the renewal of the salon steamers, in co-operation with the «Action pro Raddampfer». Revisions started in 2005/6: Sewage and power supply, refrigeration plants, diesel engine and heating are replaced. A new kitchen is installed, an improved glazing protects the passengers on the upper deck, so that the steamer can be used in every weather.

From April 25 to 26, 2014, there was a centennial exhibition on board Stadt Rapperswil at Bürkliplatz. Five years before, there was the centennial exhibition on board Stadt Zürich at Bürkliplatz. On 12 June 2009, exactly 100 years after the maiden voyage of the steamship Stadt Zürich, its anniversary trip with invited guests and its sistership Stadt Rapperswil was celebrated.

== Incidents ==
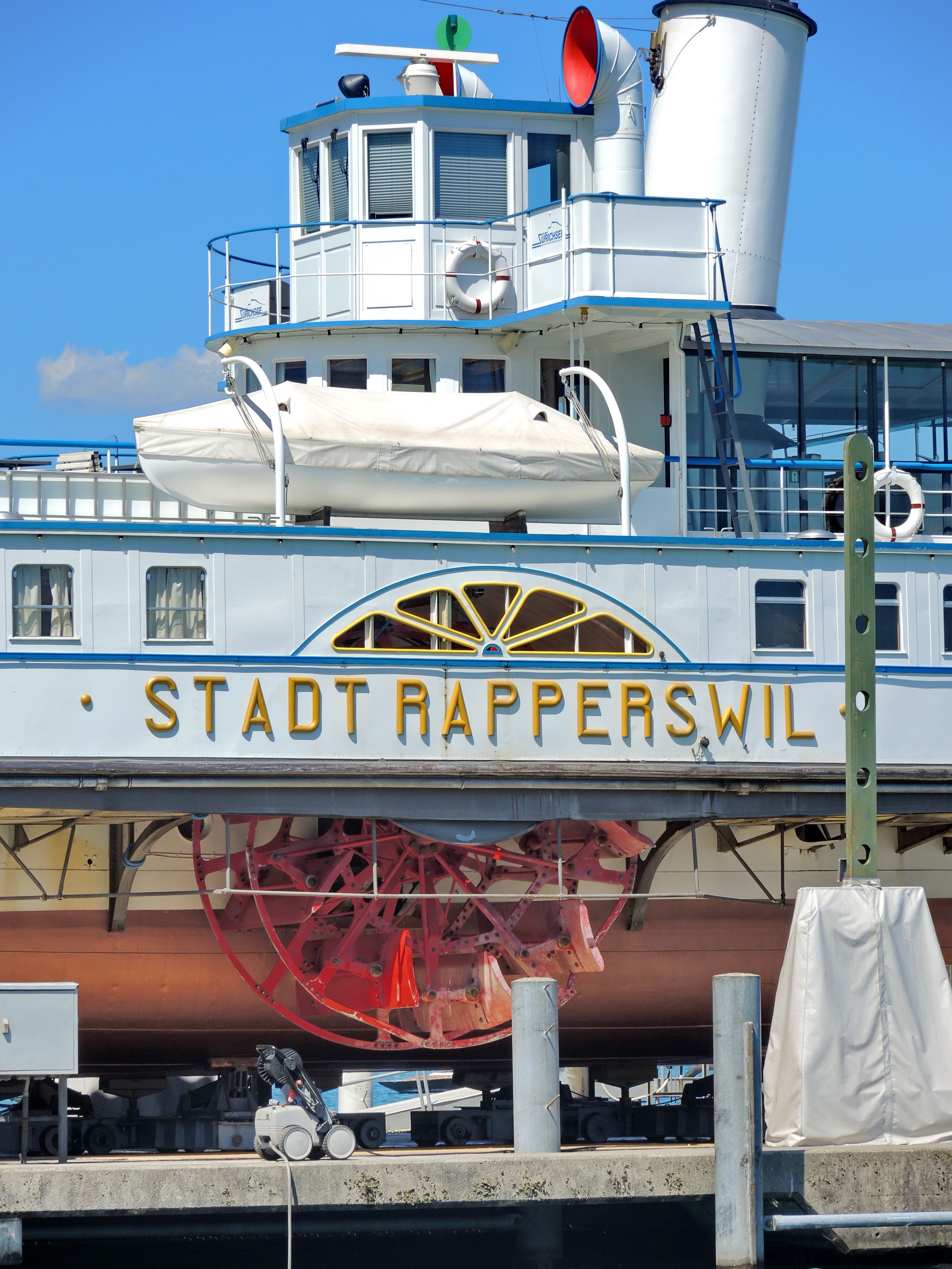
at the ZSG docks in Wollishofen after the incident of 17 July 2015

On 17 July 2015 the paddle steamer was on its way from the upper lake Zürich back to Bürkliplatz when, due to the very strong winds, it ran aground near Lützelau island. The grounding caused damage to the paddle wheel and the ship's hull plates buckled inwards along her larboard side, necessitating the evacuation of its 91 passengers onto the MS Limmat. Seven passengers wished to be transported to Pfäffikon. According to a press release, there was at no time any danger to the passengers. The paddle steamer was subsequently towed by the MS Panta Rhei back in the ZSG shipyard in Wollishofen. After the paddle steamer's haulout the ZSG announced that the ship was much more badly damaged than initially assumed, and so the repair took about four months; the costs amounted to approximately CHF 300000.

== Cultural heritage of national importance ==
Dampfschiff Stadt Rapperswil is listed in the Swiss inventory of cultural property of national and regional significance as a Class A object of national importance.

== Gallery ==
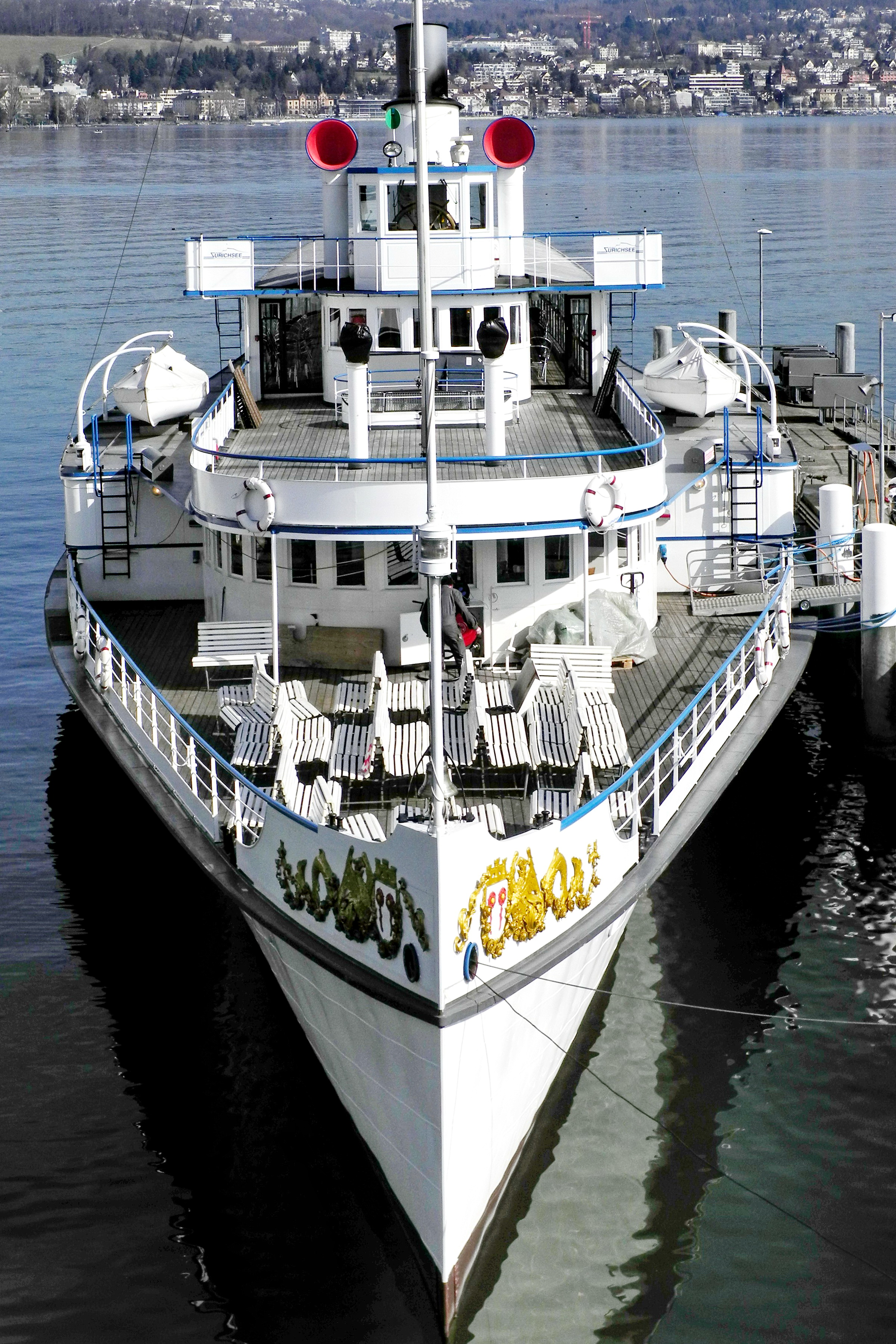

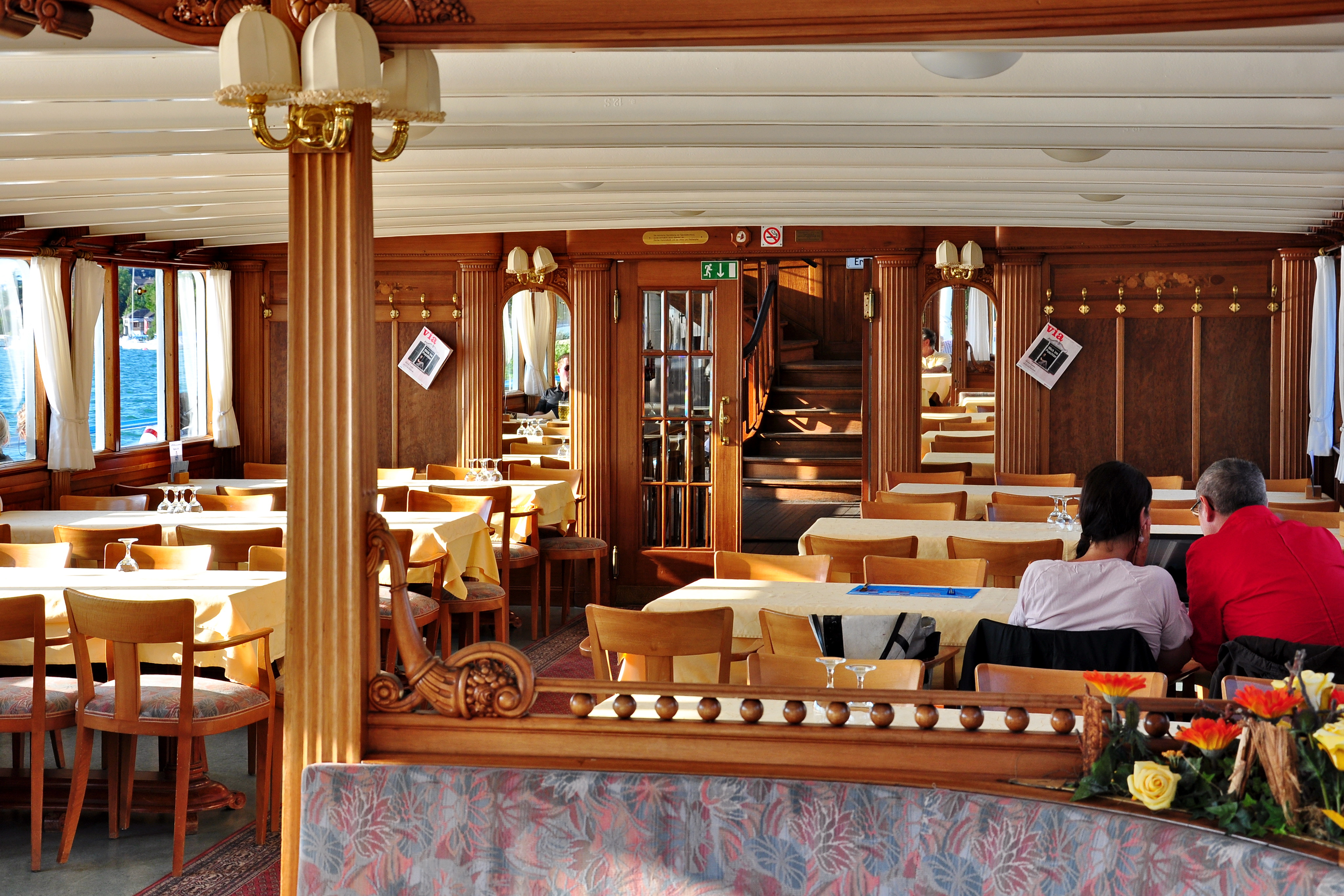
2nd-class deck

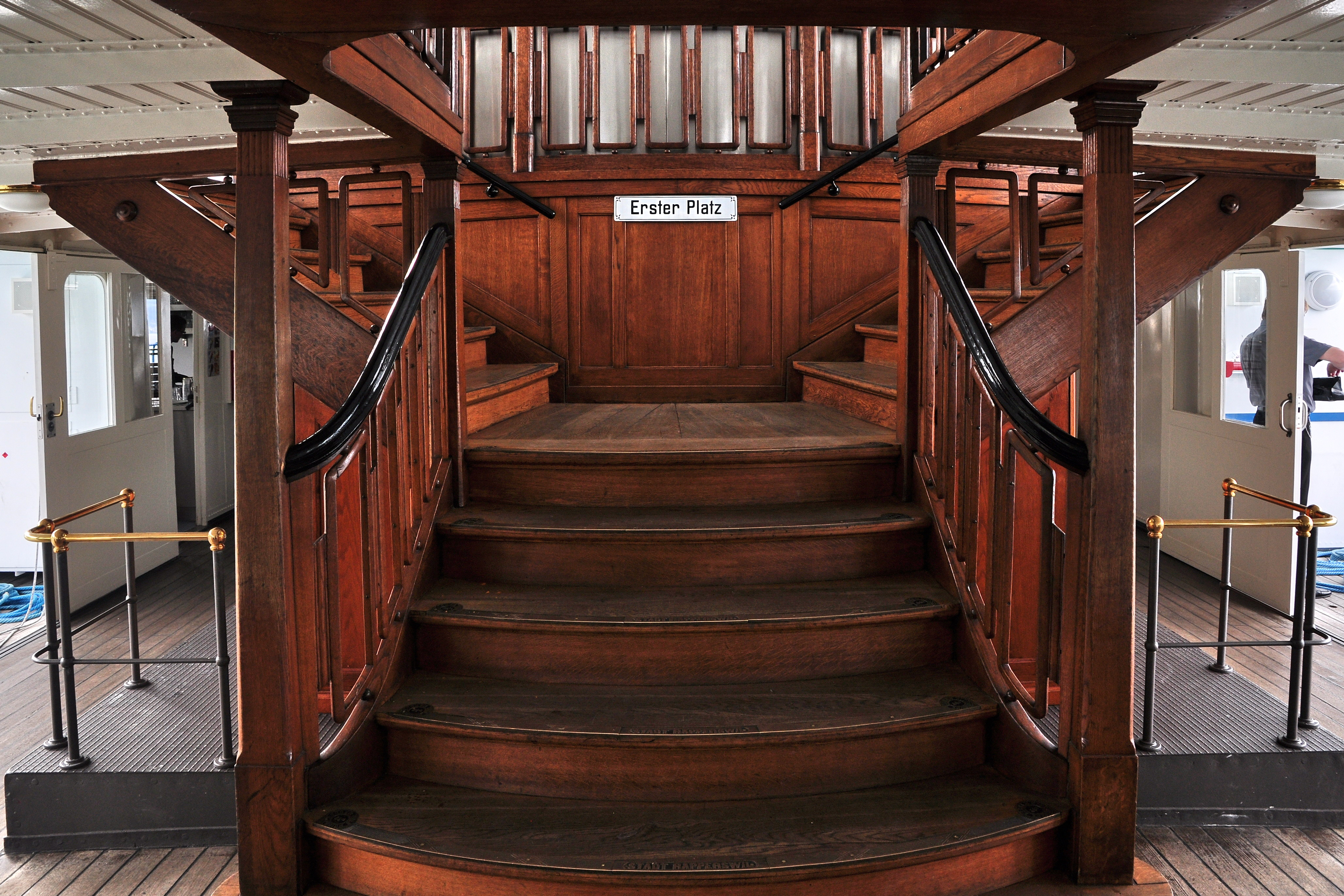
wooden stairway between the two passenger decks

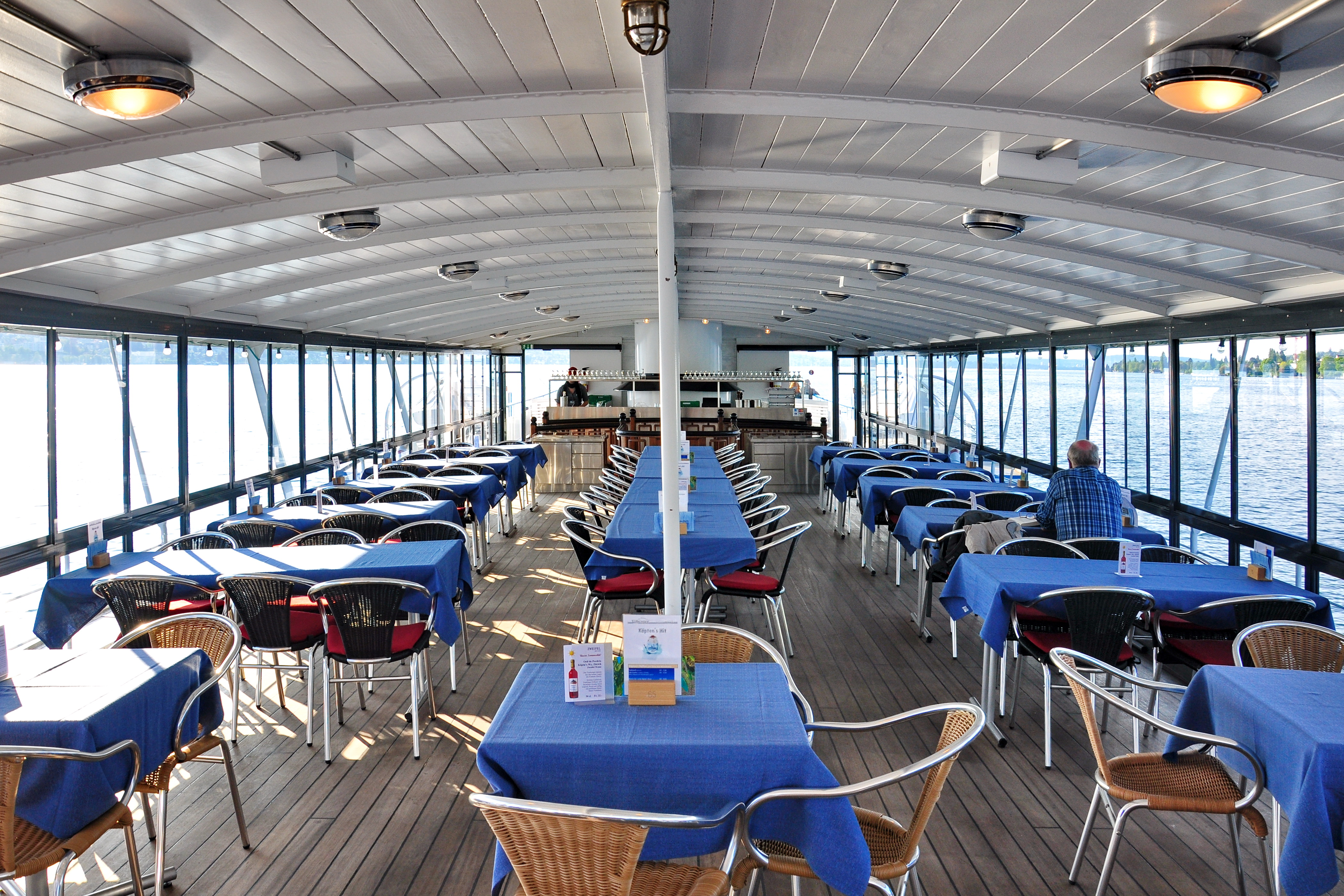
Upper 1st-class deck

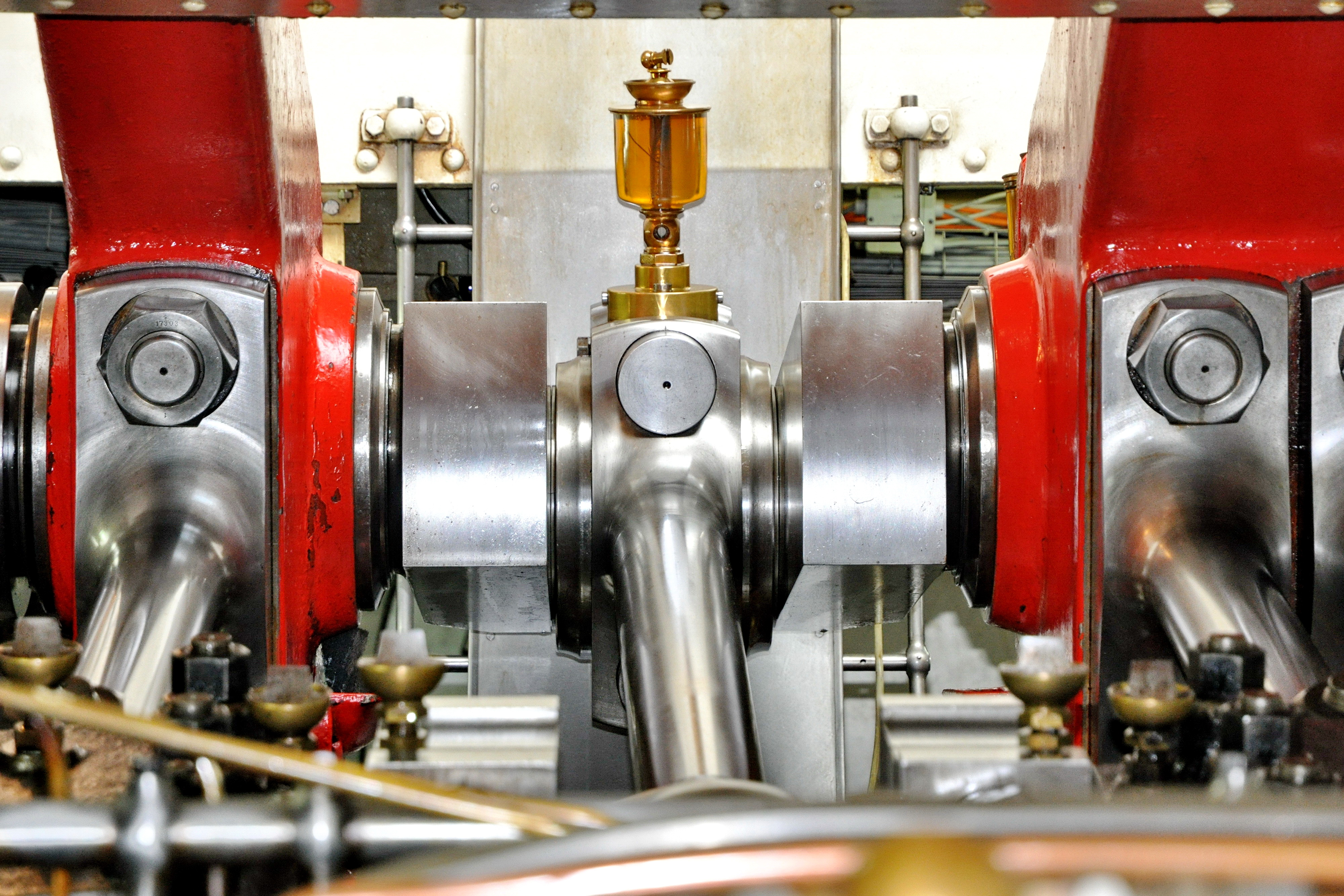
engine as seen from the motor deck

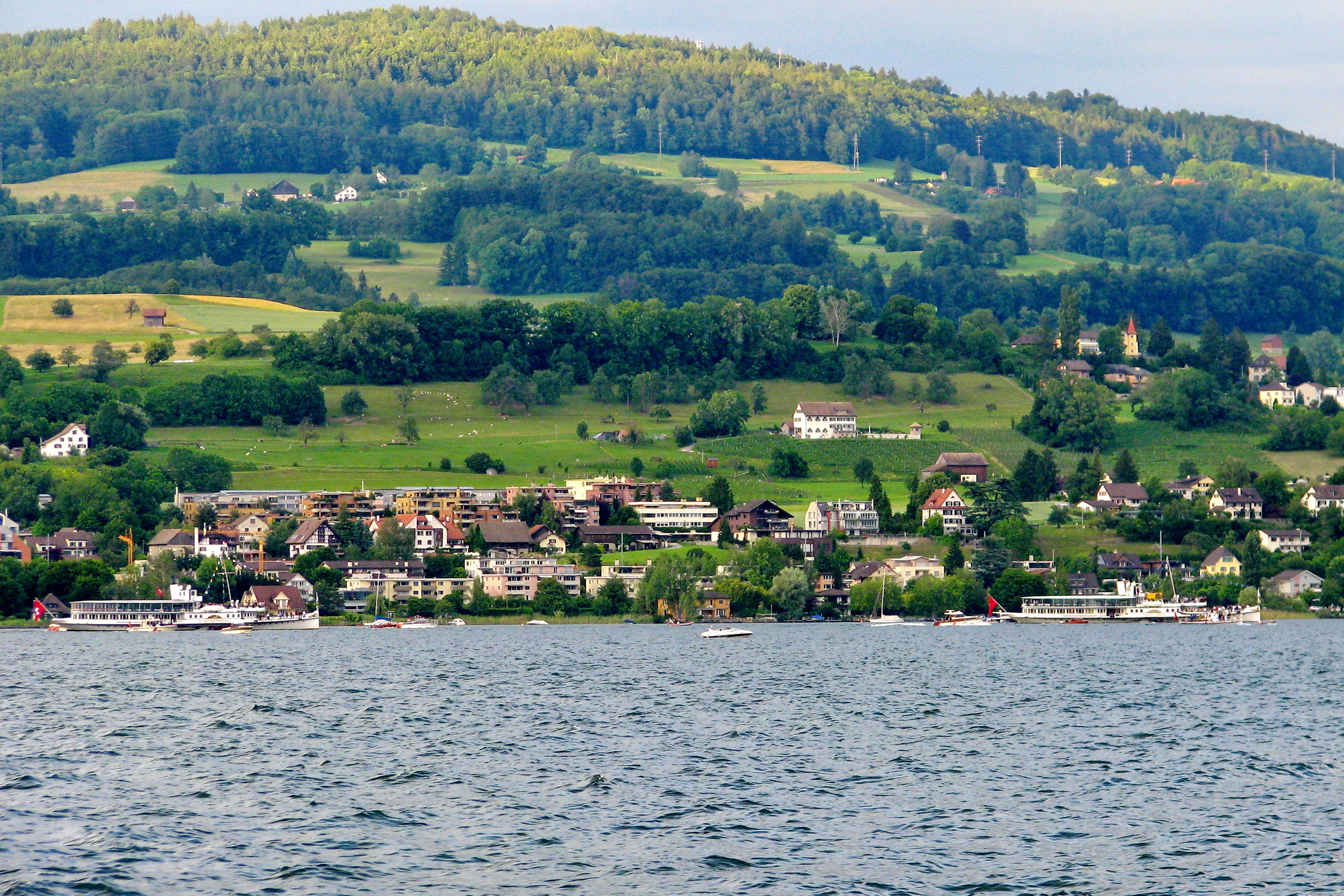
Paddle steamers Stadt Rapperswil (to the left) and Stadt Zürich on centennial tour, Pfannenstiel mountain in the background (June 12, 2009)

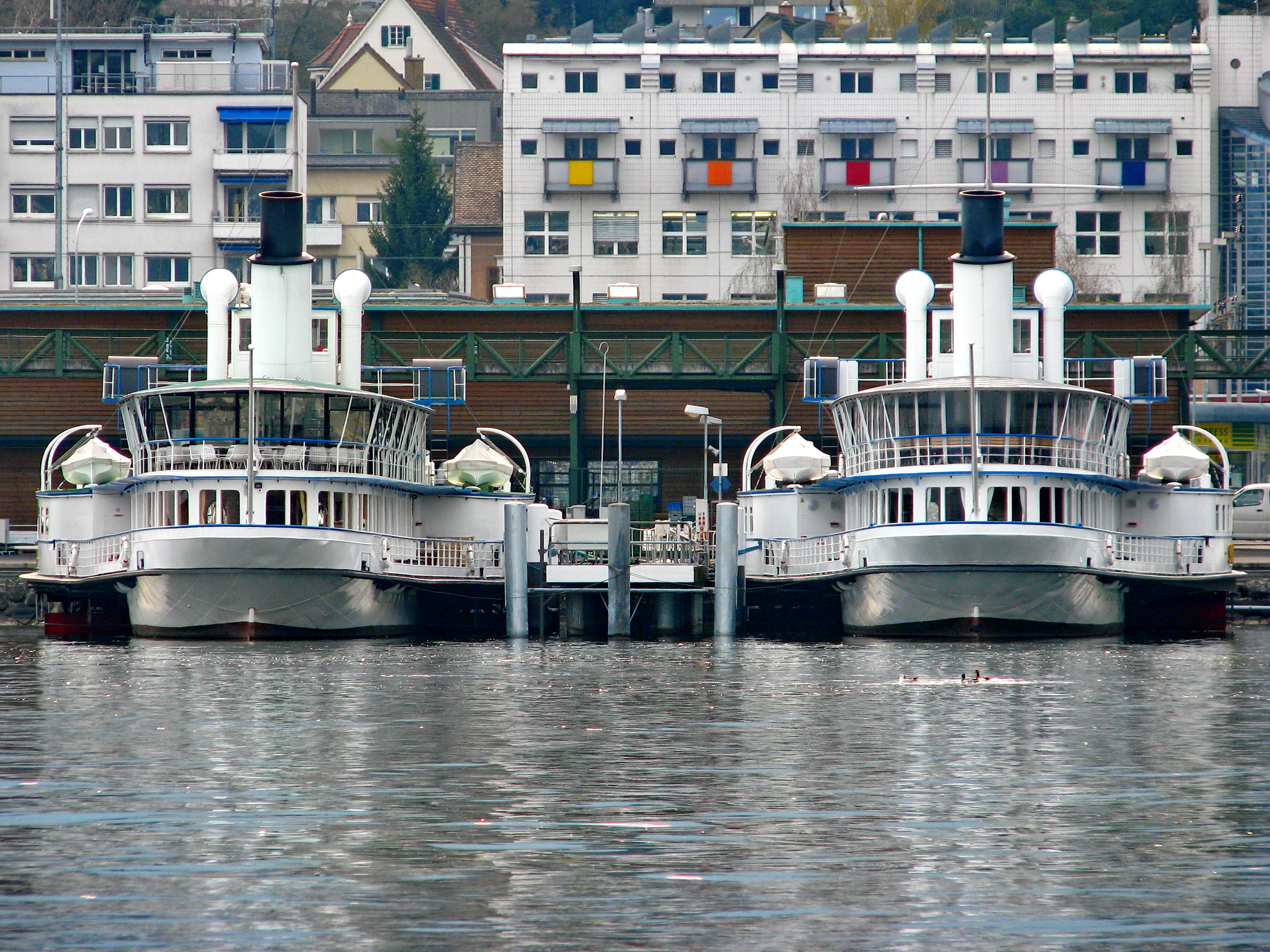
Stadt Zürich (to the left) and Stadt Rapperswil in Zürich-Wollishofen

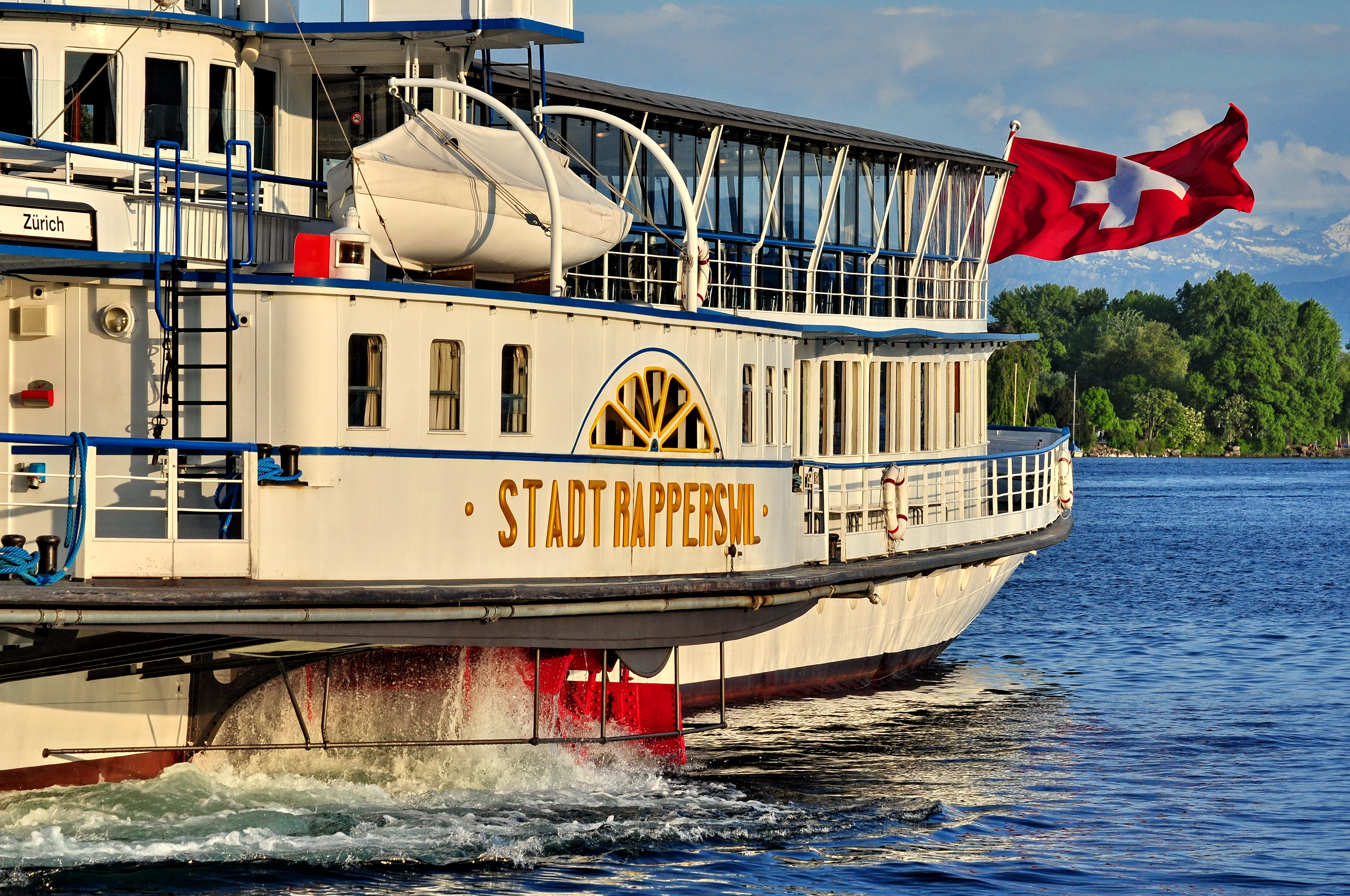

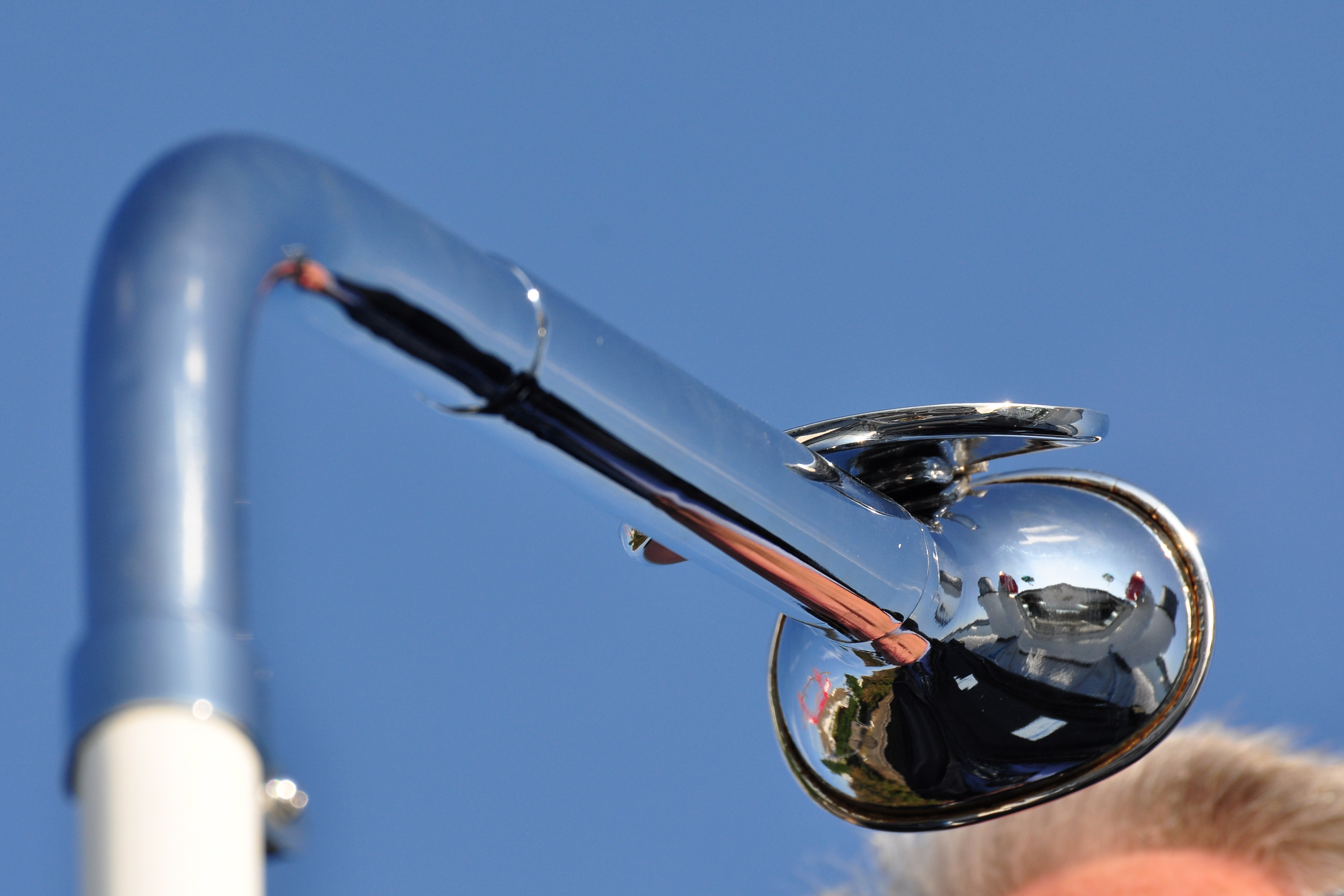

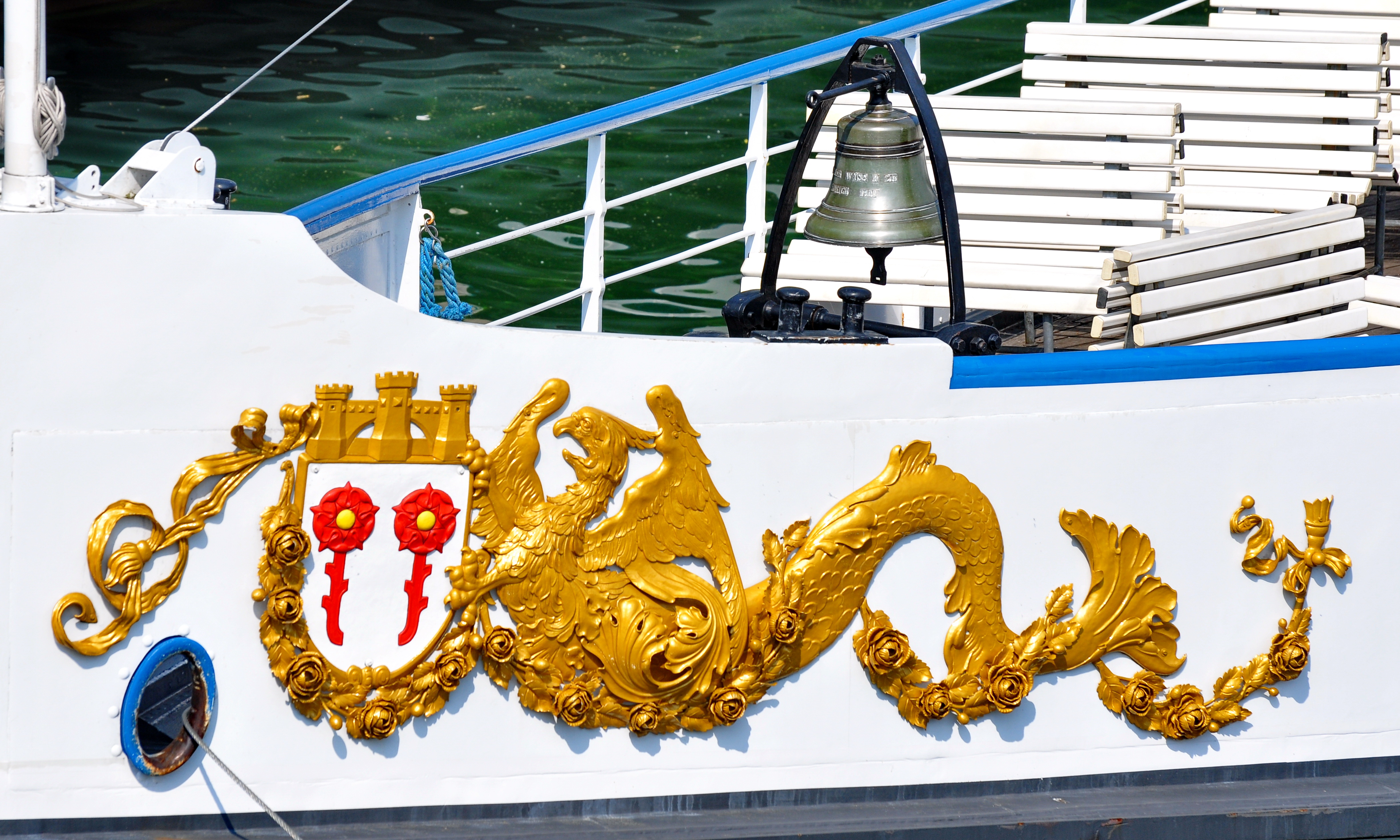

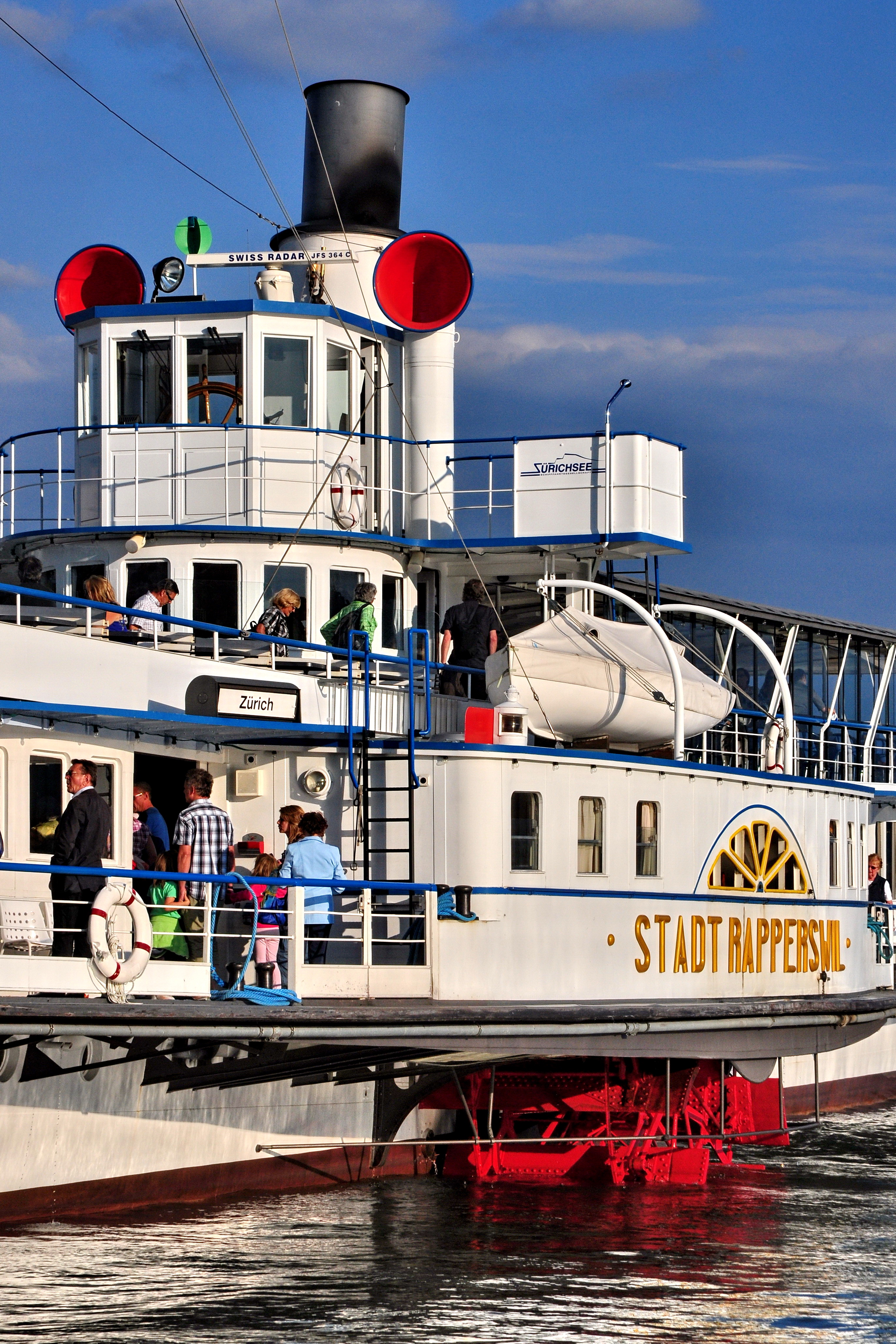

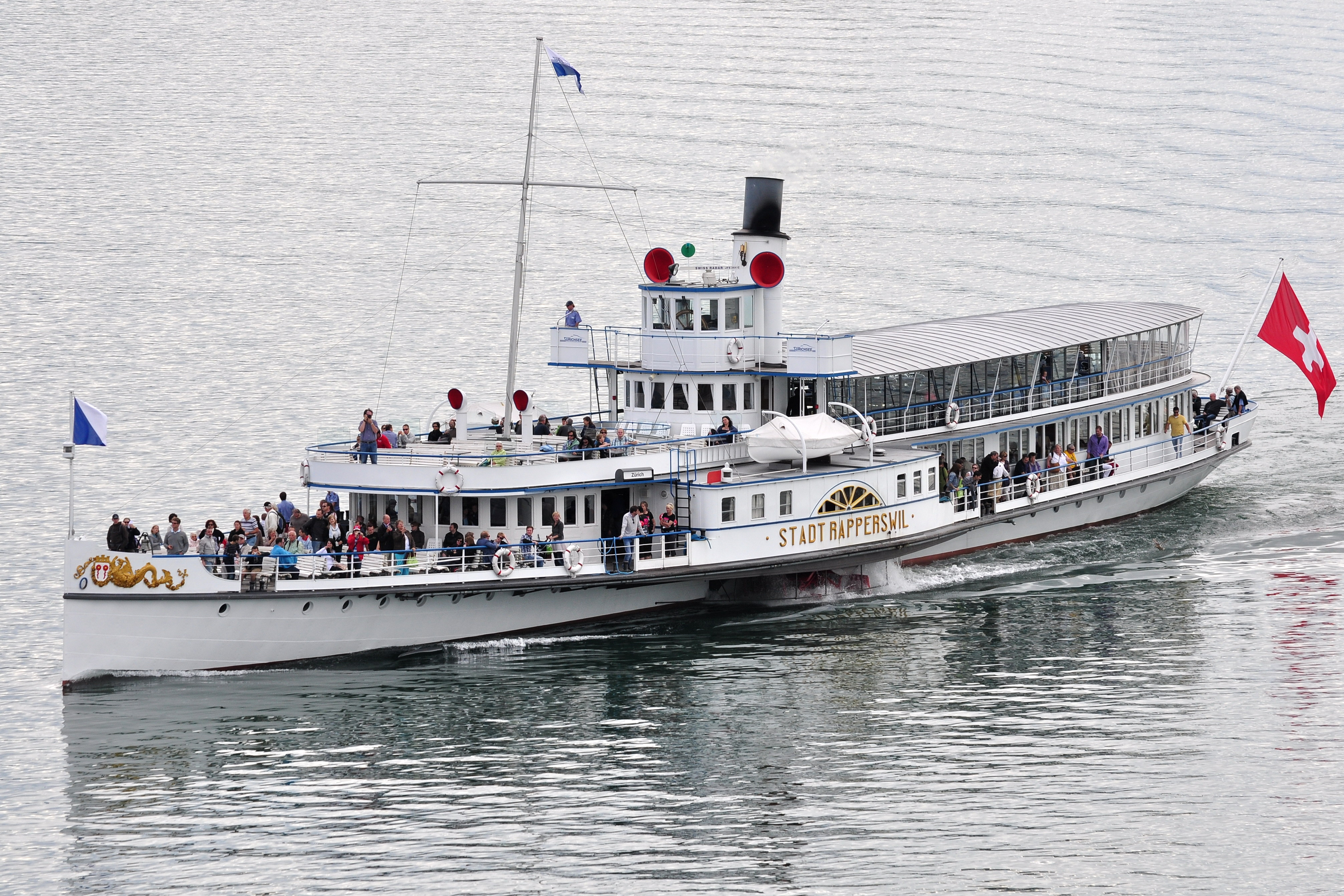
