= PS Helvetia =

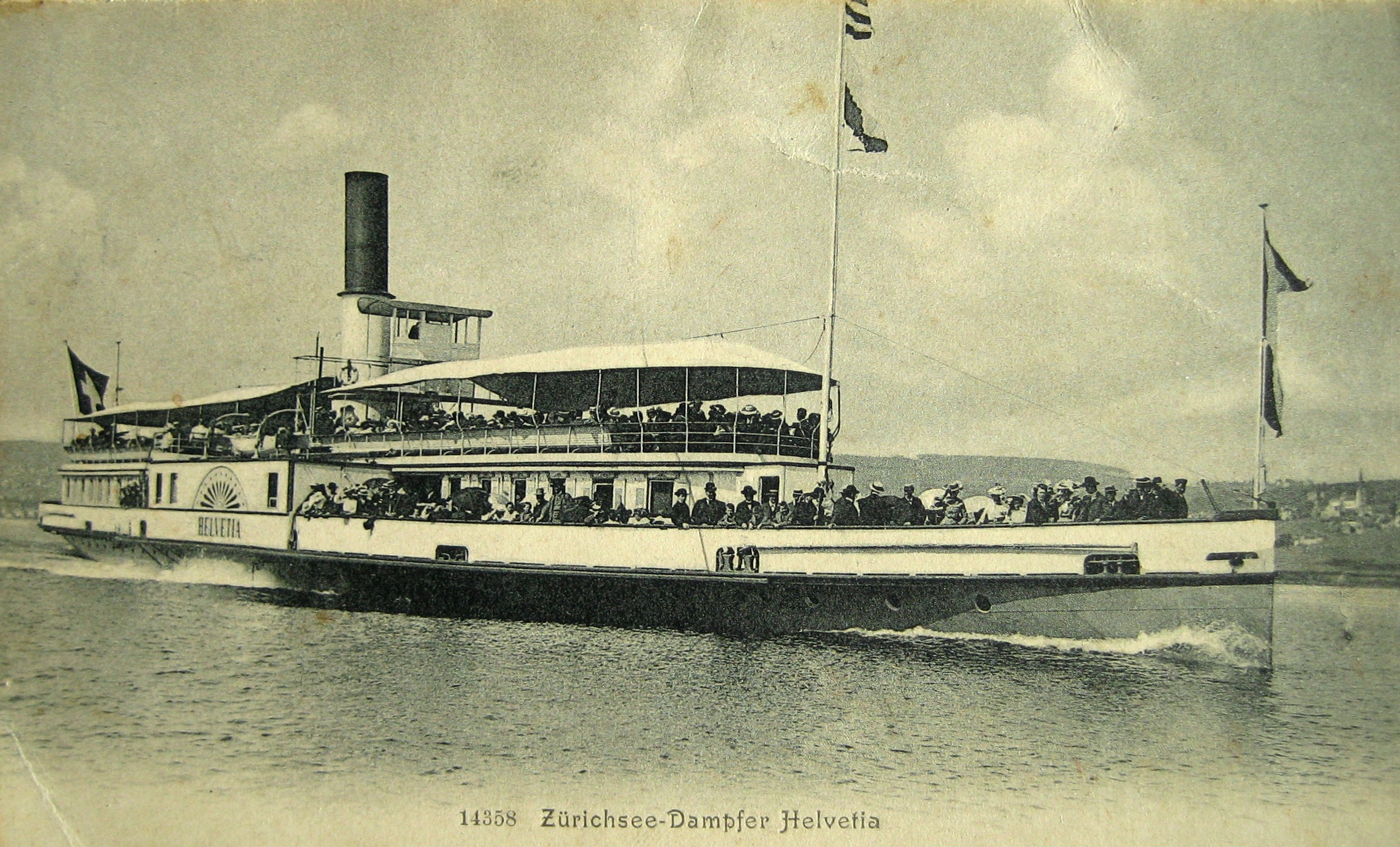
Helvetia in 1907

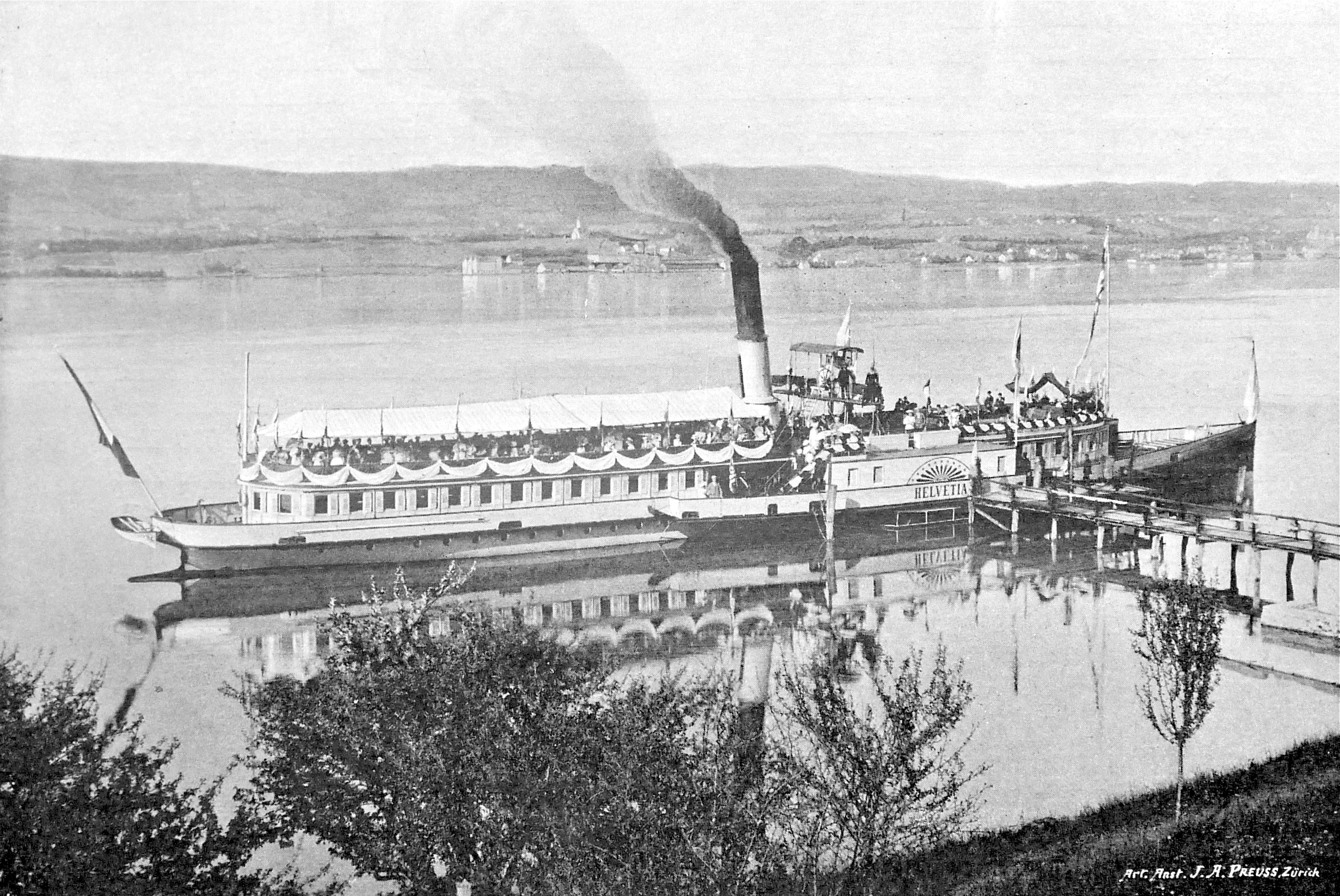
Helvetia in 1894

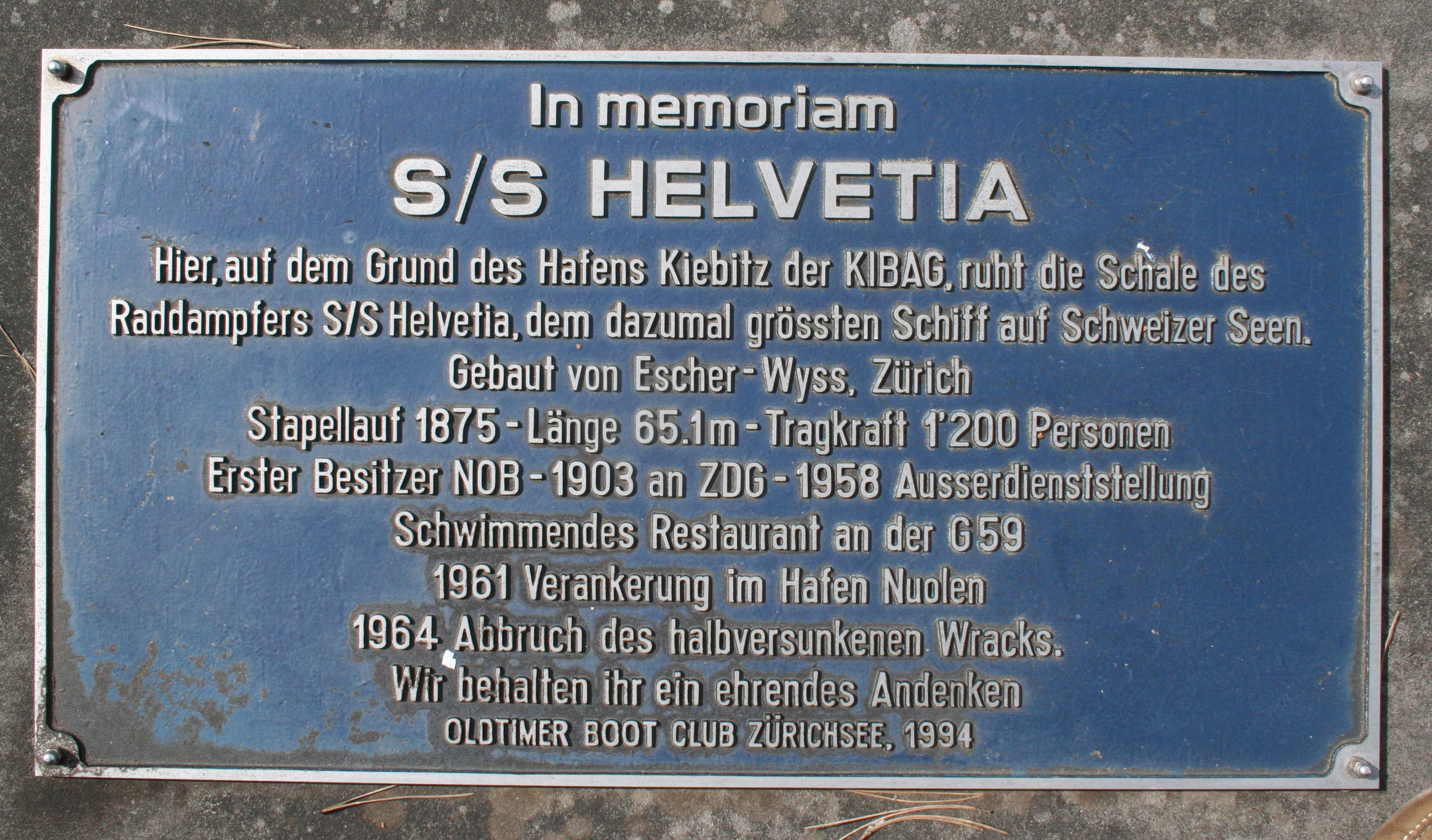
Plaque erected in memory of Helvetia

The PS Helvetia was a paddle steamer that operated on Lake Zürich in Switzerland between 1875 and 1958. She had a capacity of 1200 passengers.

The Helvetia was built in 1875 for the Swiss Northeastern Railway (NOB), and acquired by the Zürichsee-Schifffahrtsgesellschaft (ZSG) in 1903, when the NOB became part of the Swiss Federal Railways. Between 1909 and the 1950s, she operated alongside the later, and still extant, paddle steamers Stadt Zürich and Stadt Rapperswil as the backbone of the ZSG fleet. She last operated in 1958 and, after briefly serving as a restaurant ship, she was partially scrapped in 1964. The remains of her hull were scuttled at the harbour of Nuolen, where they remain.

The Helvetia was named after the national personification of Switzerland, and this name is now carried by the ZSG's motor vessel Helvetia.
