= Rüschlikon railway station =

Railway station in Switzerland

Rüschlikon
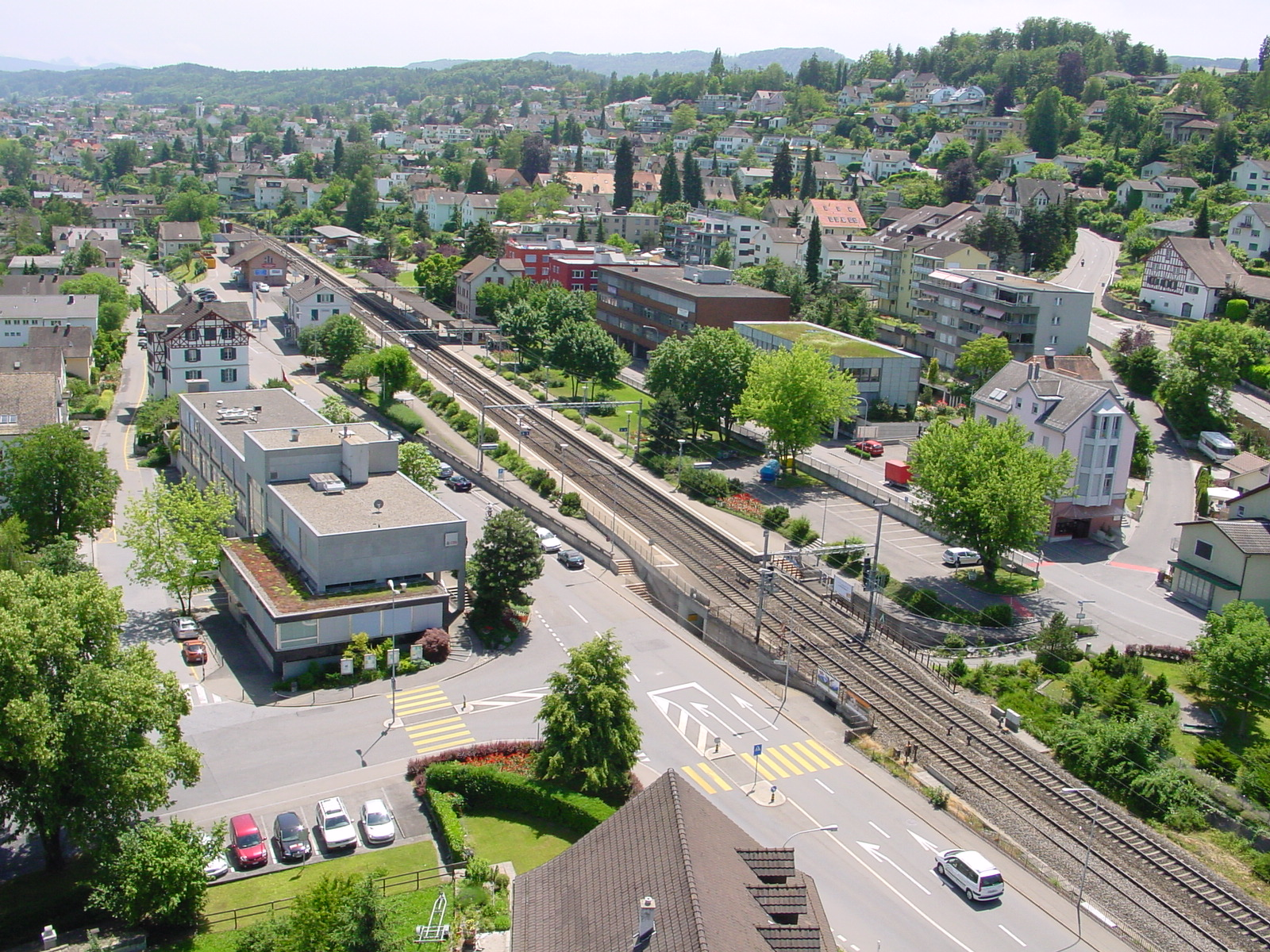
- Aerial view of the town and station of Rüschlikon

General information
- Location: Rüschlikon; Switzerland
- Coordinates: 47°19′28″N 8°32′53″E
- Elevation: 433 m (1,421 ft)
- Owner: Swiss Federal Railways
- Line: Lake Zurich left-bank line
- Platforms: 2 side platforms
- Tracks: 2
- Train operators: Swiss Federal Railways
- Connections: ZVV
- Ship: ZSG ship lines
- Bus: VBZ bus line 165

Other information
- Fare zone: 150 (ZVV)

Services
Preceding station	Zurich S-Bahn	Following station
Kilchberg towards Winterthur	S8	Thalwil towards Pfäffikon SZ
Kilchberg towards Thayngen or Weinfelden	S24	Thalwil towards Zug
Kilchberg towards Pfäffikon ZH	SN8 Limited service	Thalwil towards Lachen
Location
- Location within Switzerland Location within Canton of Zürich

Rüschlikon railway station is a railway station in Switzerland, situated near to the banks of Lake Zurich in the municipality of Rüschlikon. The station is located on the Lake Zurich left bank line, which originally formed part of the Zurich to Lucerne main line, although most main line trains now use the alternative Zimmerberg Base Tunnel routing. The station lies within fare zone 150 of the Zürcher Verkehrsverbund (ZVV).

== Services ==
=== Rail ===
Rüschlikon railway station is served by two lines of the Zurich S-Bahn: the S8 which runs between Winterthur and Pfäffikon, and the S24, which operates between Zug and Thayngen/Weinfelden. Both lines run via Zurich. As of the December 2023 timetable change, the following services call at Rüschlikon:

- Zurich S-Bahn
  - S8: half-hourly service between Pfäffikon SZ and Winterthur, via Zürich HB
  - S24: half-hourly service between Zug and Winterthur via Zürich HB, hourly service from Winterthur to Thayngen and Weinfelden

During weekends (Friday and Saturday nights), there is also a nighttime S-Bahn service (SN8) offered by ZVV.

- Nighttime S-Bahn (only during weekends):
  - SN8: hourly service between Pfäffikon ZH and Lachen (via Zürich HB)

=== Bus and boat ===
There is a nearby bus stop ("Rüschlikon, Bahnhof") served by VBZ bus route 165.

There is also a nearby landing stage of Zürichsee-Schifffahrtsgesellschaft (ZSG), from whre ships run either in direction to Zurich Bürkliplatz or Rapperswil/Schmerikon, serving the terminals of several lakeside towns and Ufenau island en route.

== See also ==
- Rail transport in Switzerland
