= Zurich Wollishofen railway station =

Railway station in the Wollishofen quarter of the Swiss city of Zürich

Zürich Wollishofen
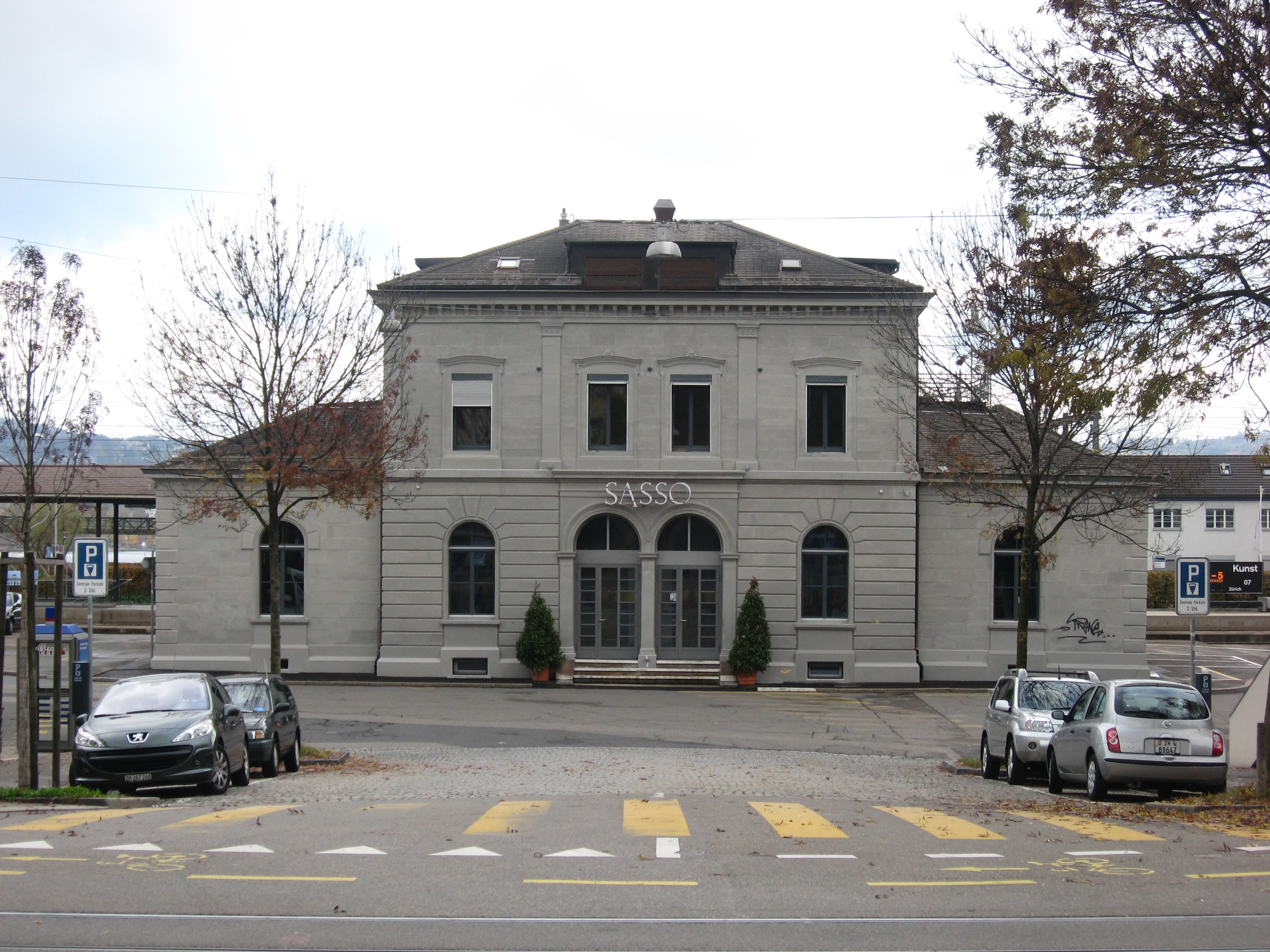
- Wollishofen station building, now used as a bar and restaurant

General information
- Location: Wollishofen; Switzerland
- Coordinates: 47°20′51″N 8°32′01″E
- Elevation: 409 m (1,342 ft)
- Owner: Swiss Federal Railways
- Line: Lake Zürich left-bank line
- Platforms: 1
- Tracks: 2
- Train operators: Swiss Federal Railways
- Connections: ZVV: Bhf. Wollishofen
- Ship: ZSG boat cruises
- Tram: VBZ tram 7
- Bus: VBZ bus lines 70 161 165 184 185
- Airport: Direct line S24 to/from Zürich Flughafen in 0:28h

Other information
- Fare zone: ZVV 110

Passengers
- 2018: 3800 per weekday

Services
Preceding station	Zurich S-Bahn	Following station
Zürich Enge towards Winterthur	S8	Kilchberg towards Pfäffikon SZ
Zürich Enge towards Thayngen or Weinfelden	S24	Kilchberg towards Zug
Zürich Enge towards Pfäffikon ZH	SN8 Limited service	Kilchberg towards Lachen
Location
- Location within Switzerland Location within Canton of Zürich

Zürich Wollishofen railway station (German: Bahnhof Zürich Wollishofen) is a railway station in the Wollishofen quarter of the Swiss city of Zurich. It is located within fare zone 110 of the Zürcher Verkehrsverbund (ZVV). The station is situated close to the western shore of Lake Zurich, and adjacent to the shipyard and pier of the Zürichsee-Schifffahrtsgesellschaft, who operate the principal passenger boat services on the lake.

The station is located on the Lake Zürich left bank line, which originally formed part of the Zürich to Lucerne main line, although most main line trains now use the alternative Zimmerberg Base Tunnel routing since it opened in 2003.

Wollishofen station is within walking distance to the Rote Fabrik, a cultural centre used as a music venue.

== Services ==
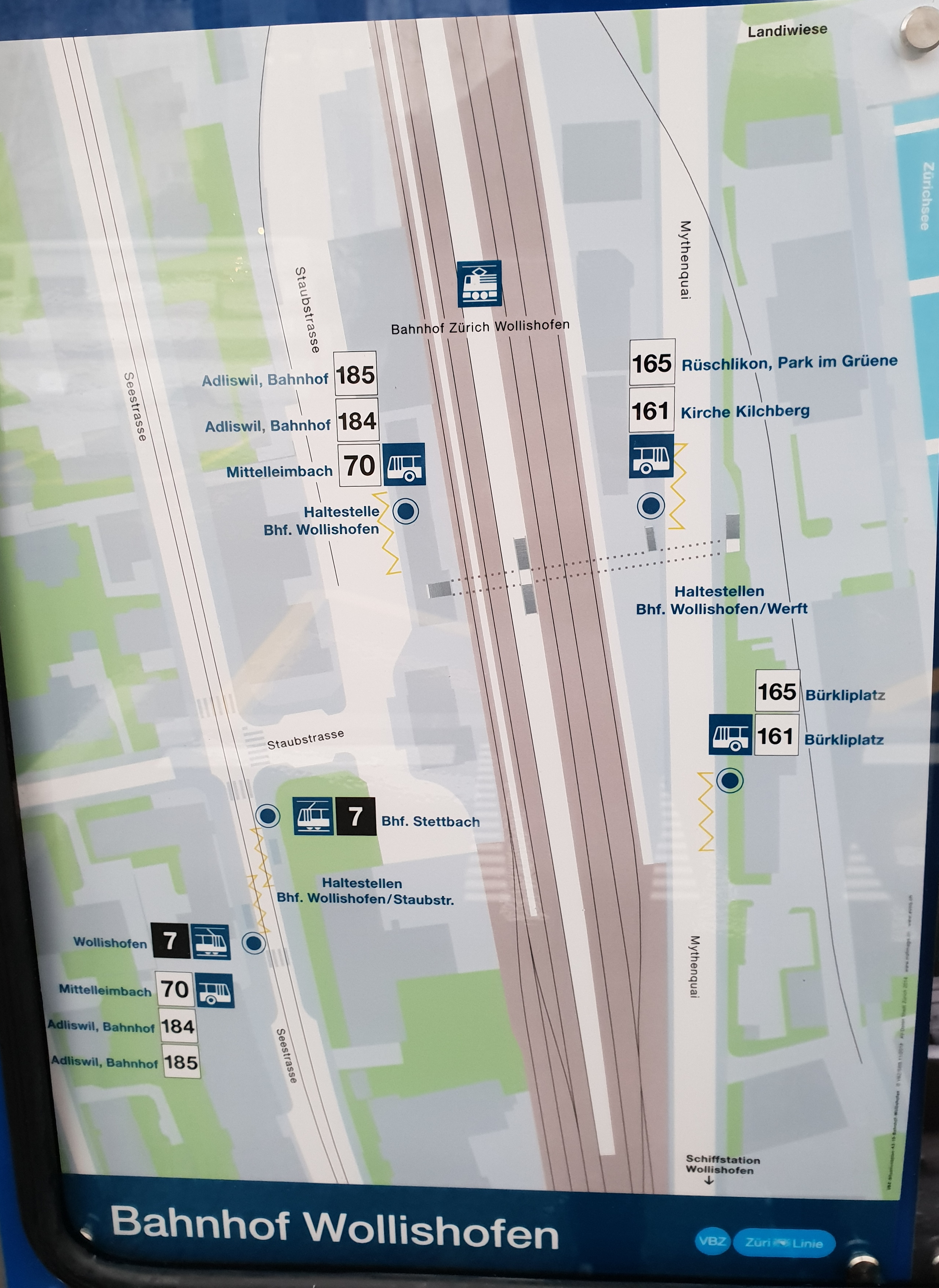
Locations of tram and bus stops

=== Train ===
Wollishofen station is served by lines S8 and S24 of the Zürich S-Bahn.

- S8: half-hourly service between Winterthur and Pfäffikon SZ.
- S24: half-hourly service between Winterthur and Zug; trains continue from Winterthur to either Thayngen or Weinfelden.

During weekends, there is a nighttime S-Bahn service (SN8) offered by ZVV:

- SN8: hourly service between Pfäffikon ZH and Lachen via Zürich HB.

=== Other modes of transport ===
There is a tram and bus stop, called Bahnhof Wollishofen, west of the reception building. Another nearby stop is Bhf. Wollishofen/Werft, situated to the east of the station, is a bus stop. Zürich tram route 7 and VBZ bus routes 70, 184 and 185 stop at Bahnhof Wollishofen, while Bhf. Wollishofen/Werft is served by VBZ bus lines 161 and 165. The pier of Zürichsee-Schifffahrtsgesellschaft (ZSG), Wollishofen ZSG, is located southeast to the railway station.

Summary of tram and bus services:

- Bahnhof Wollishofen to the west of the reception building, VBZ tram line 7 and VBZ bus routes 70, 184 and 185.
- Bhf. Wollishofen/Werft to the east, VBZ bus routes 161 and 165.

== History ==
The current station building was first built between 1863 and 1864 in the city of Zug, about 20 kilometres (12 miles) to the south. Because Zug railway station was completely renewed later, the station building was dismantled and rebuilt in Wollishofen in 1897.

== Gallery ==
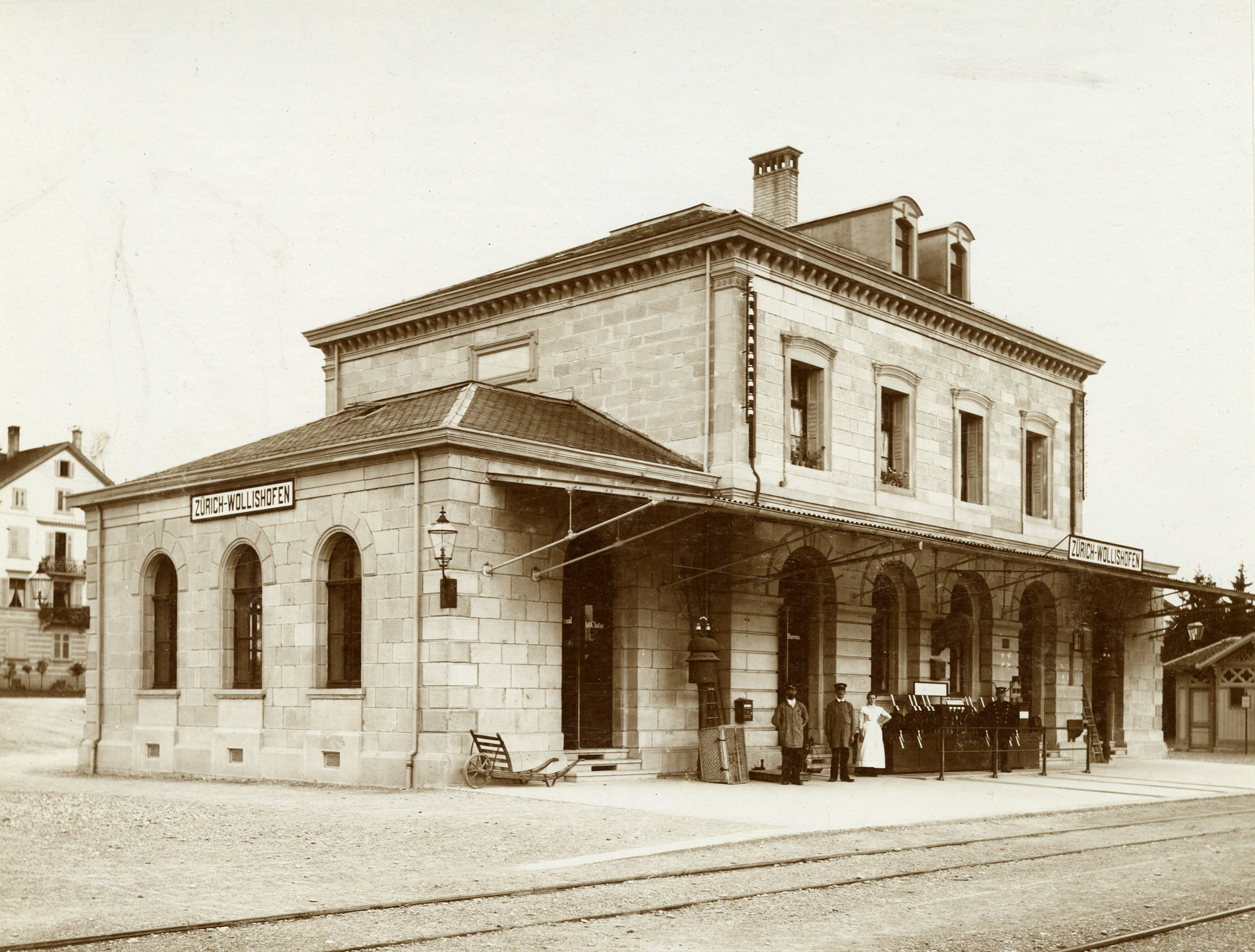
Reception building (ca. 1900)

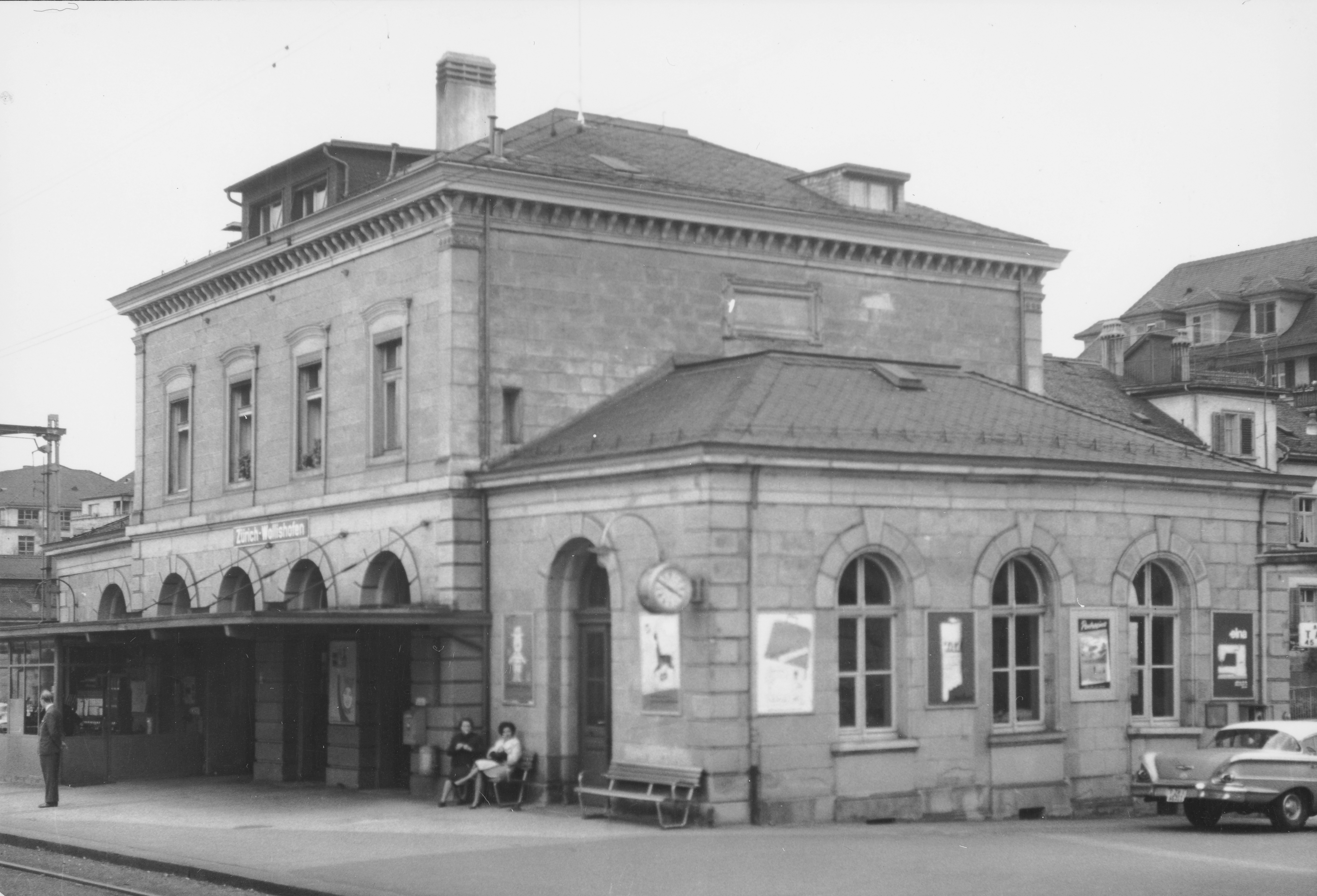
Reception building and tracks (1963)

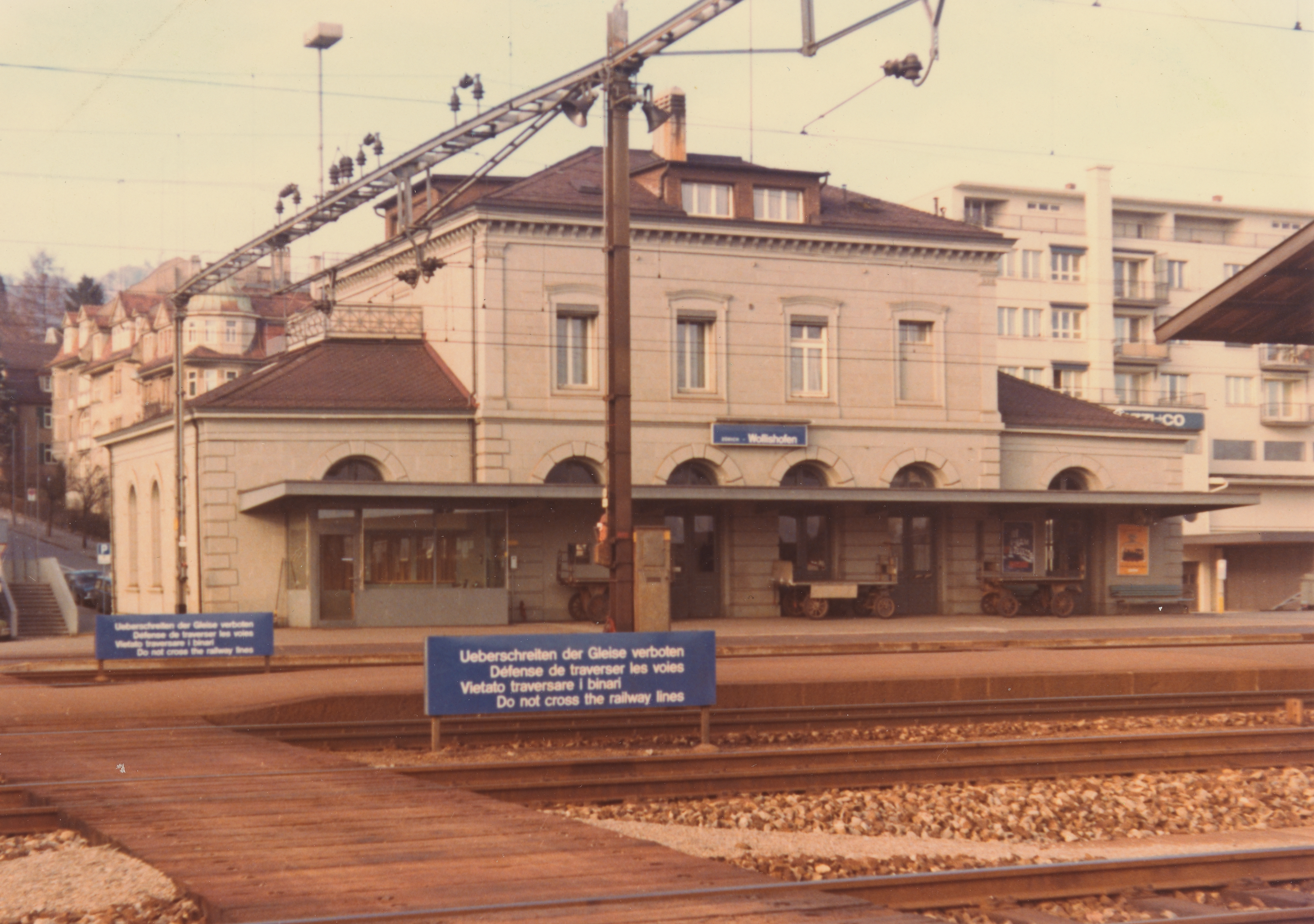
Reception building and tracks (1980)

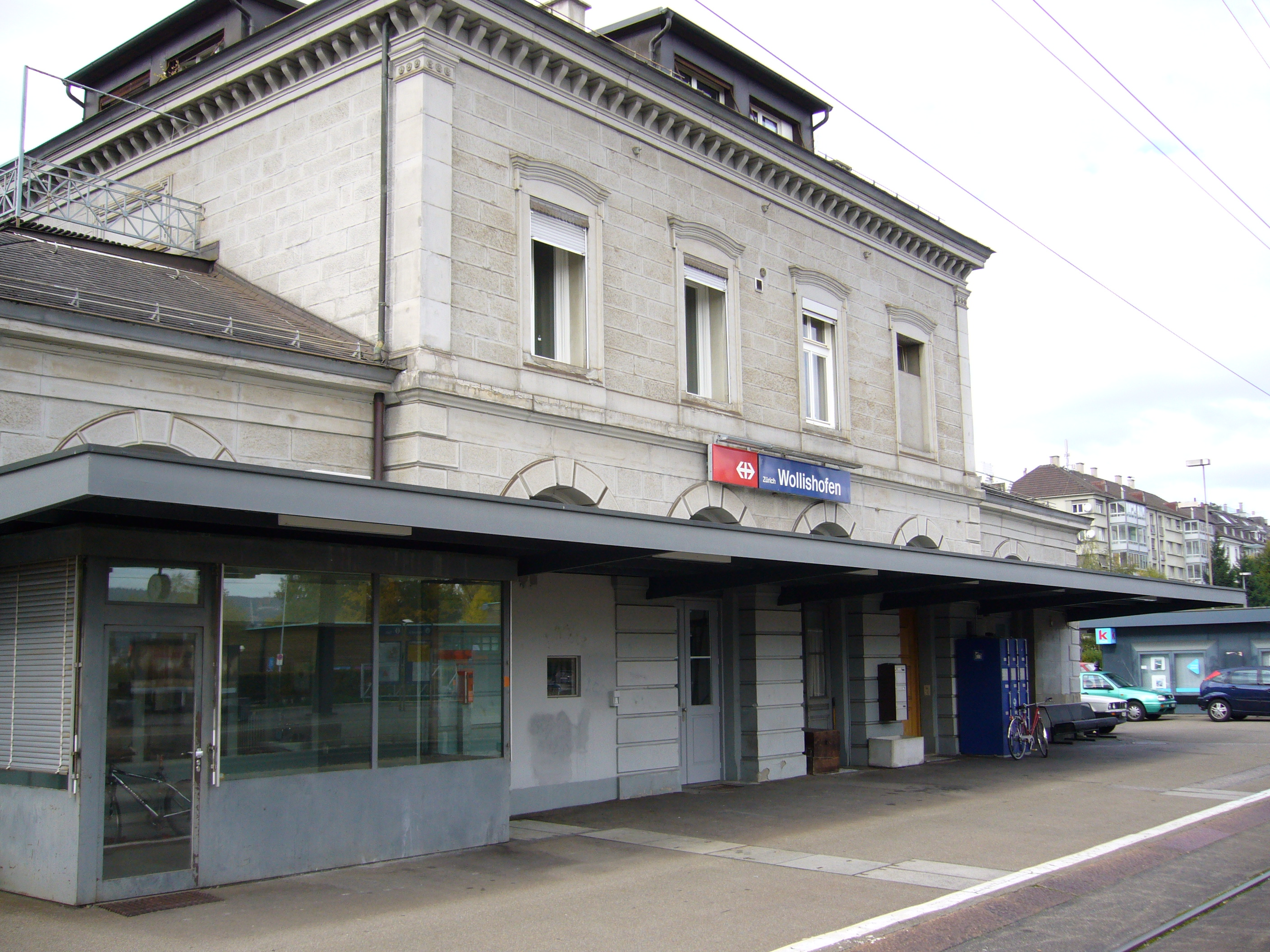
Reception building and tracks (2005)

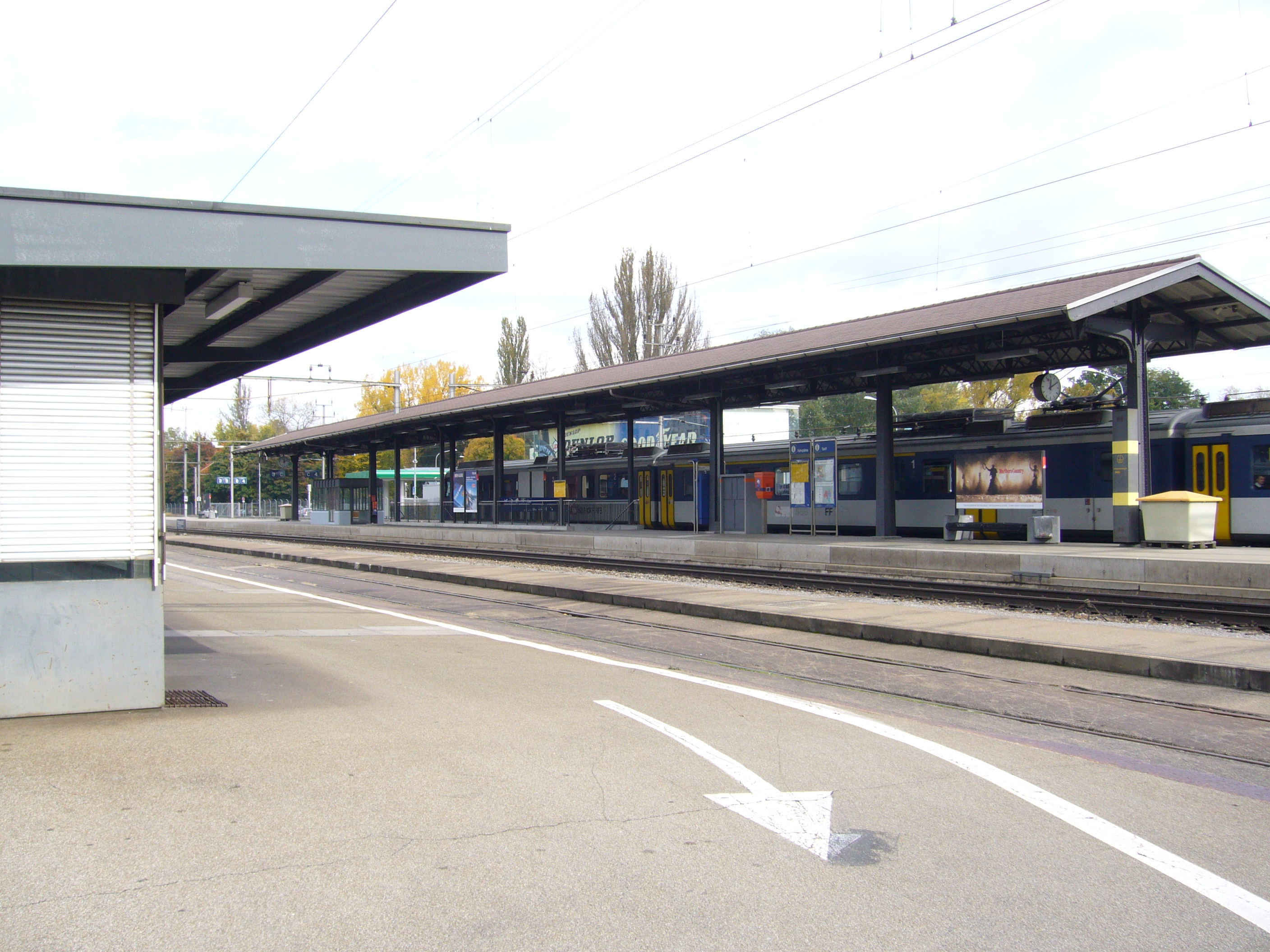
platform with tracks (Gleis) 3 and 4 (2005)

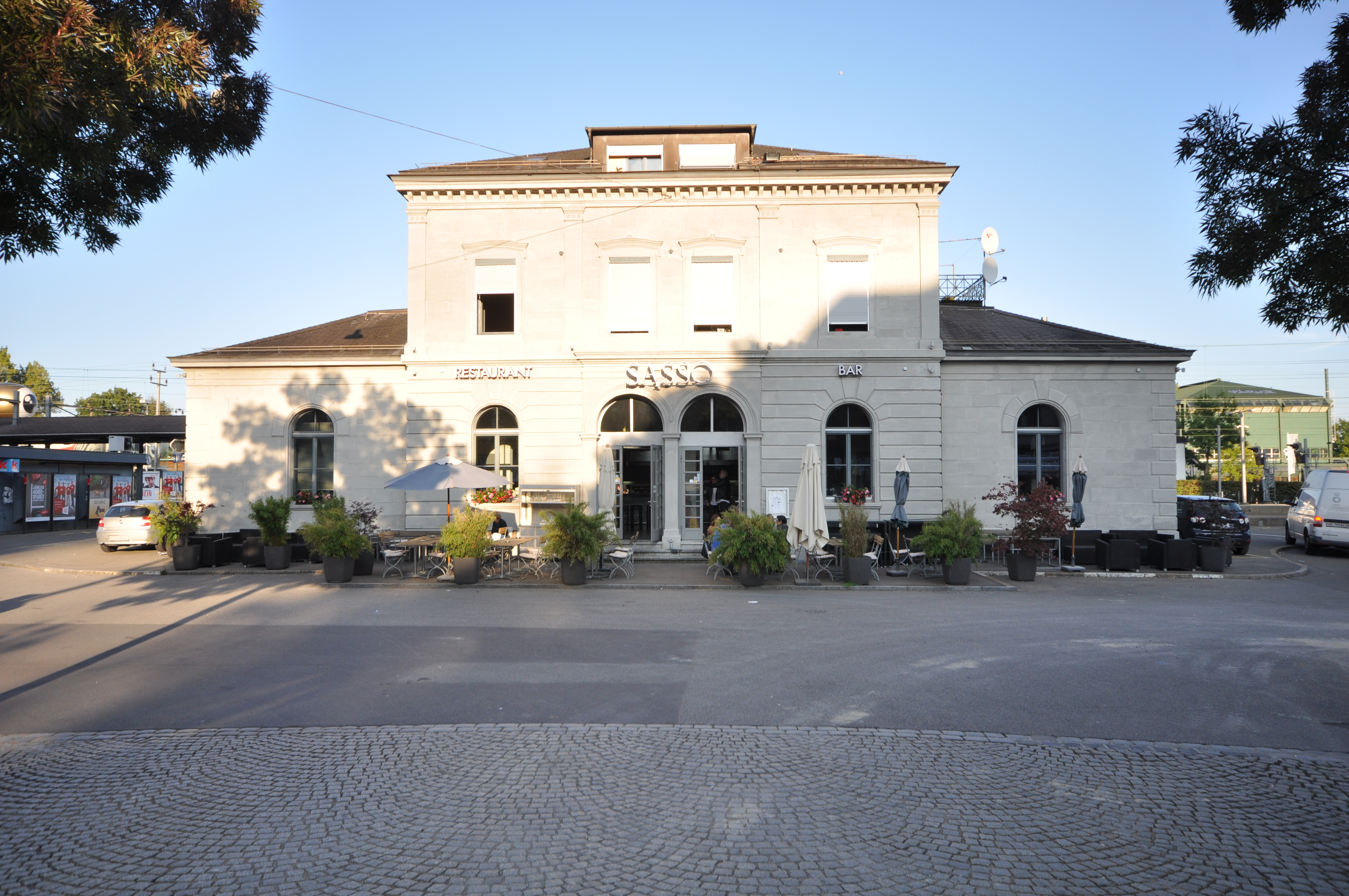
Reception building (2014)

== See also ==
- History of rail transport in Switzerland
- List of railway stations in Zurich
- Public transport in Zurich
- Rail transport in Switzerland
