= Zurich Wiedikon railway station =

Urban railway station in western Zürich, Switzerland

Zürich Wiedikon
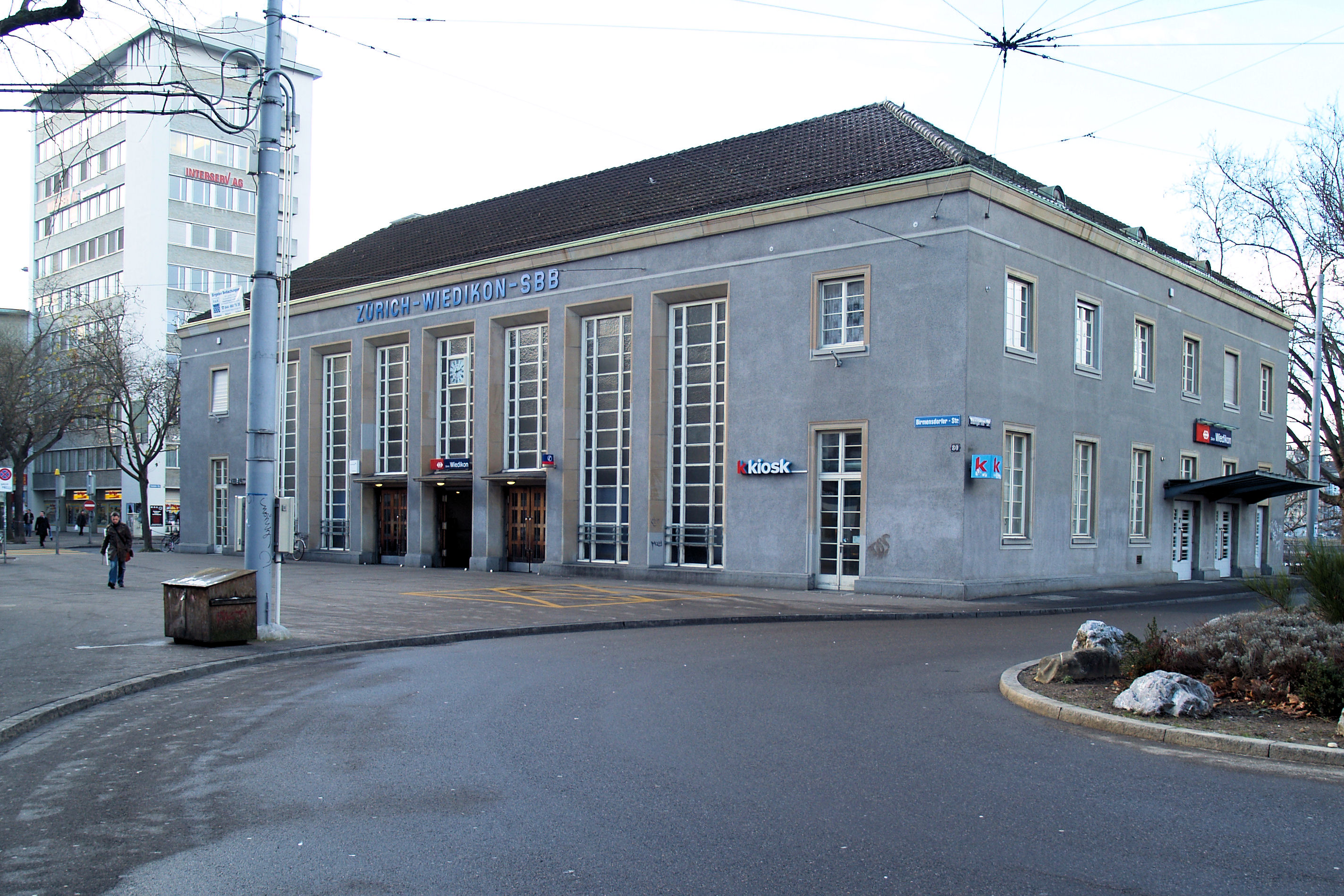
- The station building from the street in 2008

General information
- Location: Wiedikon; Switzerland
- Coordinates: 47°22′17″N 8°31′24″E
- Elevation: 405 m (1,329 ft)
- Owner: Swiss Federal Railways
- Line: Lake Zürich left-bank line
- Platforms: 3
- Tracks: 3
- Train operators: Swiss Federal Railways
- Connections: ZVV: Bhf. Wiedikon
- Tram: VBZ trams 2 3 9 14
- Trolleybus: VBZ trolleybus 32
- Bus: VBZ bus lines 67 76; PostAuto bus lines 215 235 236 245 350

Construction
- Architect: Hermann Herter (1927)

Other information
- Fare zone: ZVV 110

History
- Opened: 1875
- Rebuilt: 1925–1927

Passengers
- 2025: 12,700 per day (SBB)
- Rank: 64 out of 1,095

Services
Preceding station	Zurich S-Bahn	Following station
Zürich HB towards Zurich Airport	S2	Zürich Enge towards Ziegelbrücke
Zürich HB towards Winterthur	S8	Zürich Enge towards Pfäffikon SZ
Zürich HB towards Thayngen or Weinfelden	S24	Zürich Enge towards Zug
Zürich HB towards Pfäffikon ZH	SN8 Limited service	Zürich Enge towards Lachen
Location
- Location within Switzerland Location within Canton of Zürich

Zürich Wiedikon railway station (German: Bahnhof Zürich Wiedikon) is a railway station on the Zurich S-Bahn system in Wiedikon in the western part of the Swiss city of Zurich. The station is located within fare zone 110 of the Zürcher Verkehrsverbund (ZVV). and served by S-Bahn trains on the Lake Zürich left bank line approaching the city from the south and south-east directions. InterCity and InterRegio trains and the accelerated S25 service bypass the station through the Zimmerberg Base Tunnel since 2003.

It is the only railway station in Switzerland where the ticket office building is located on a bridge above the tracks – in German, this is known as Reiterbahnhof.

== History ==
The first Wiedikon station opened in 1875 with the opening of the Lake Zürich left bank line. The line's original routing through the area differed from the current alignment and was largely at street level, with many level crossings, and passed immediately to the east of the existing station.

The current station was built between 1925 and 1927, when the line was rerouted to the west, using a lower level alignment with more tunneling. The architect was Hermann Herter.

== Operation ==
The railways approach the station from both north and south are below ground level, with a cutting to the north and the 848 m (2,782 ft) Ulmberg tunnel is to the south. The connecting line to the Giesshübel station on the Sihltal Zürich Uetliberg Bahn diverges at the southern end of the station, also in tunnel. The latter is not normally used for passenger services unless trains are diverted.

The station has three tracks and three platforms. All the platforms can be used by trains in both directions on the Lake Zurich line, but only the westernmost is accessible to trains on the Giesshübel connector.

== Services ==
=== Train ===
The station is served by lines S2, S8, and S24 of Zürich S-Bahn:

- S2: half-hourly service between Zürich Airport and Ziegelbrücke (via Zürich HB).
- S8: half-hourly service between Winterthur and Pfäffikon SZ via Zürich HB.
- S24: half-hourly service between Winterthur and Zug (via Zürich HB); continues from Winterthur alternately to Thayngen or Weinfelden.

During weekends, there is a nighttime S-Bahn service (SN8) offered by ZVV:

- SN8: hourly service between Pfäffikon ZH and Lachen via Zürich HB.

=== Tram/Bus ===
There are two tram/bus stops near Wiedikon railway station. Bahnhof Wiedikon is a tram and bus stop in front of the reception building at the southern end of the railway station. The northern access to the platforms is close to tram and bus stop Kalkbreite/Bhf. Wiedikon. Zürich tram routes 9 and 14 stop at Bahnhof Wiedikon, which is also the terminus of municipal bus routes 67 and 76, and of regional bus routes 215, 235, 236, 245 and 350. Tram routes 2 and 3, and trolleybus route 32 stop at Kalkbreite/Bhf. Wiedikon.

Summary of tram and bus services:

- Bahnhof Wiedikon to the south next to the reception building, VBZ tram lines 9 and 14, VBZ bus lines 67 and 76, PostAuto bus lines 215, 235, 236, 245, and 350;
- Kalkbreite/Bhf. Wiedikon via northern access to the platforms, VBZ tram lines 2 and 3 and VBZ trolleybus line 32;

== Gallery ==
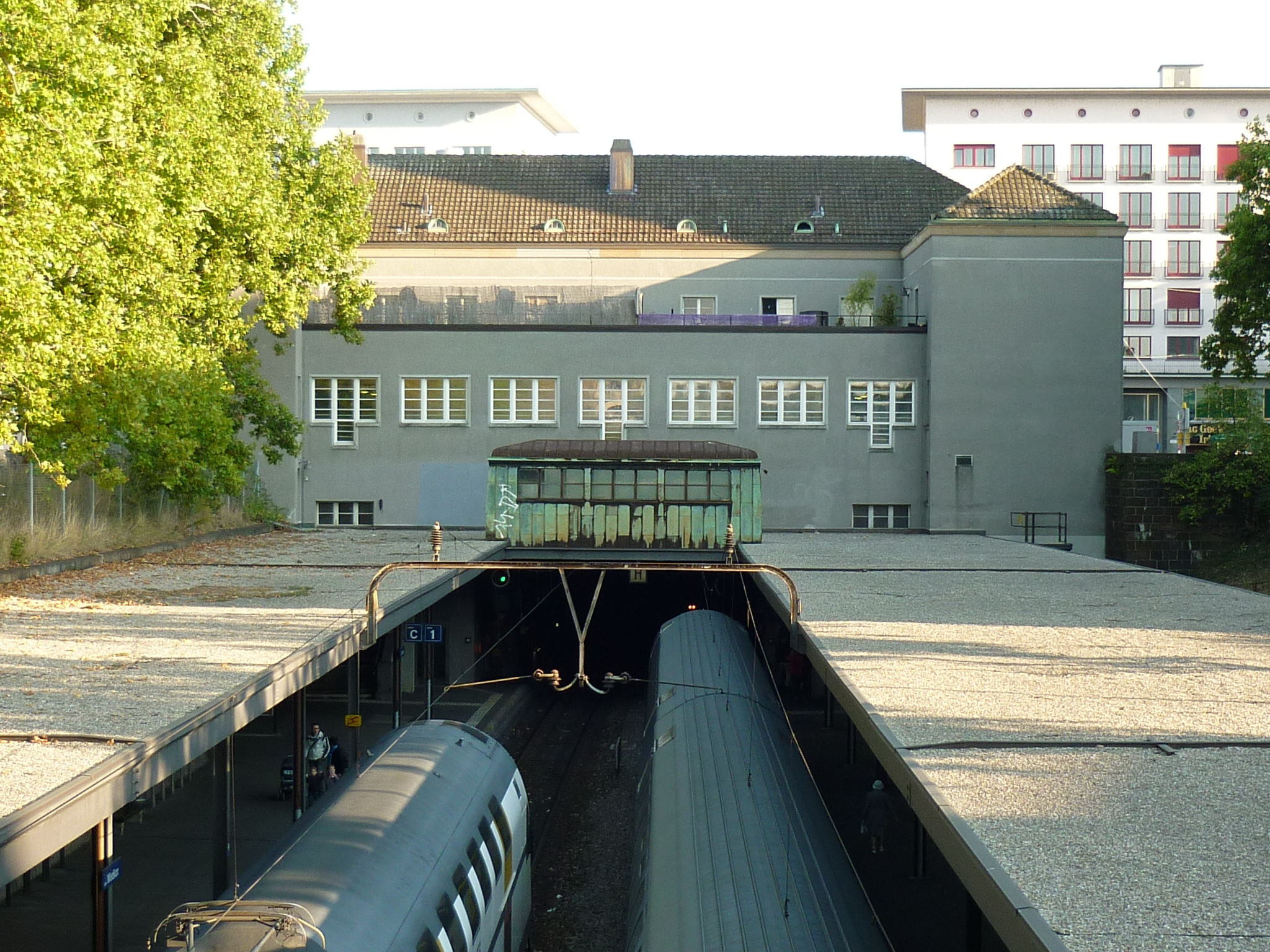
The station platforms

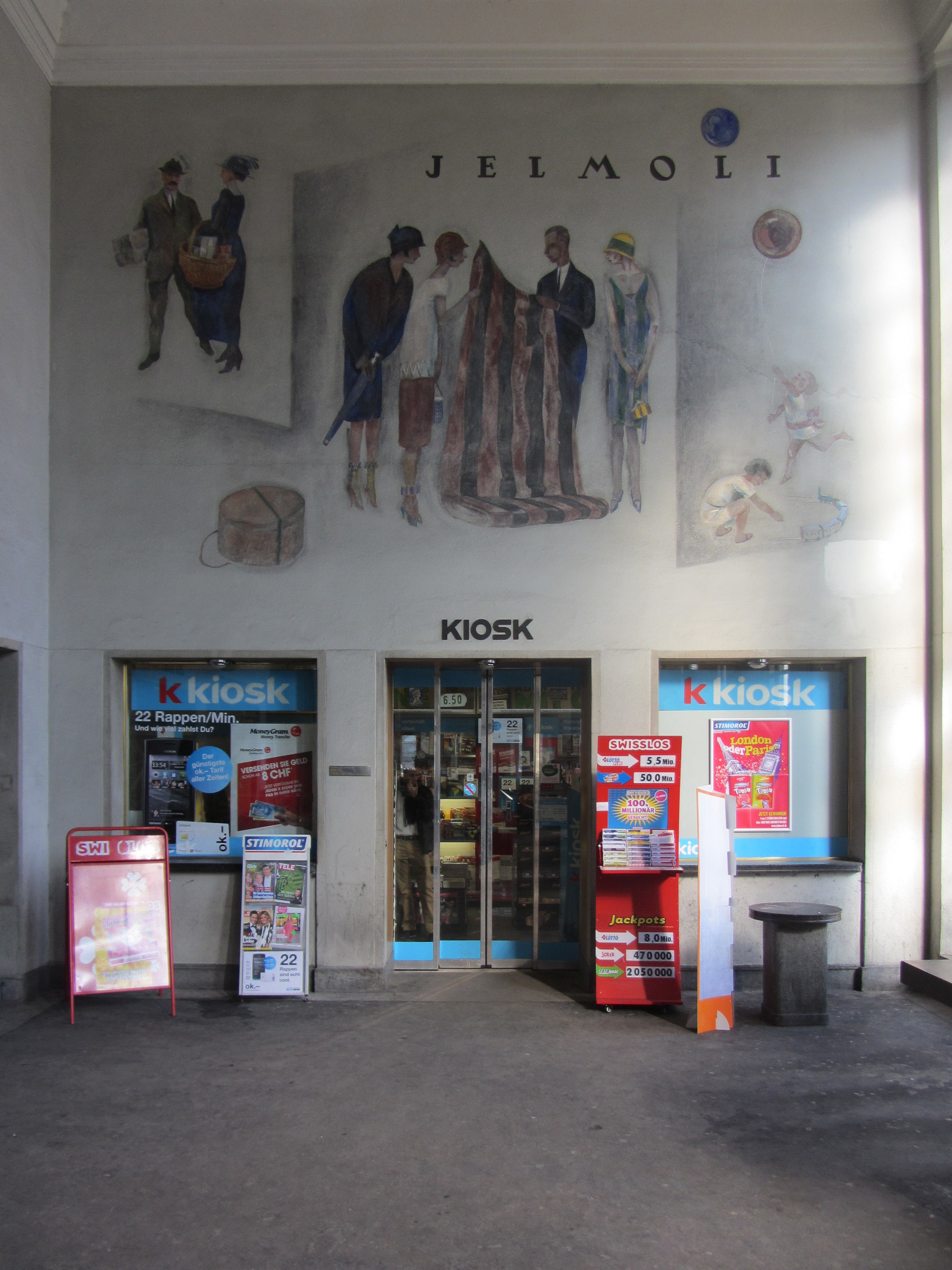
The station interior

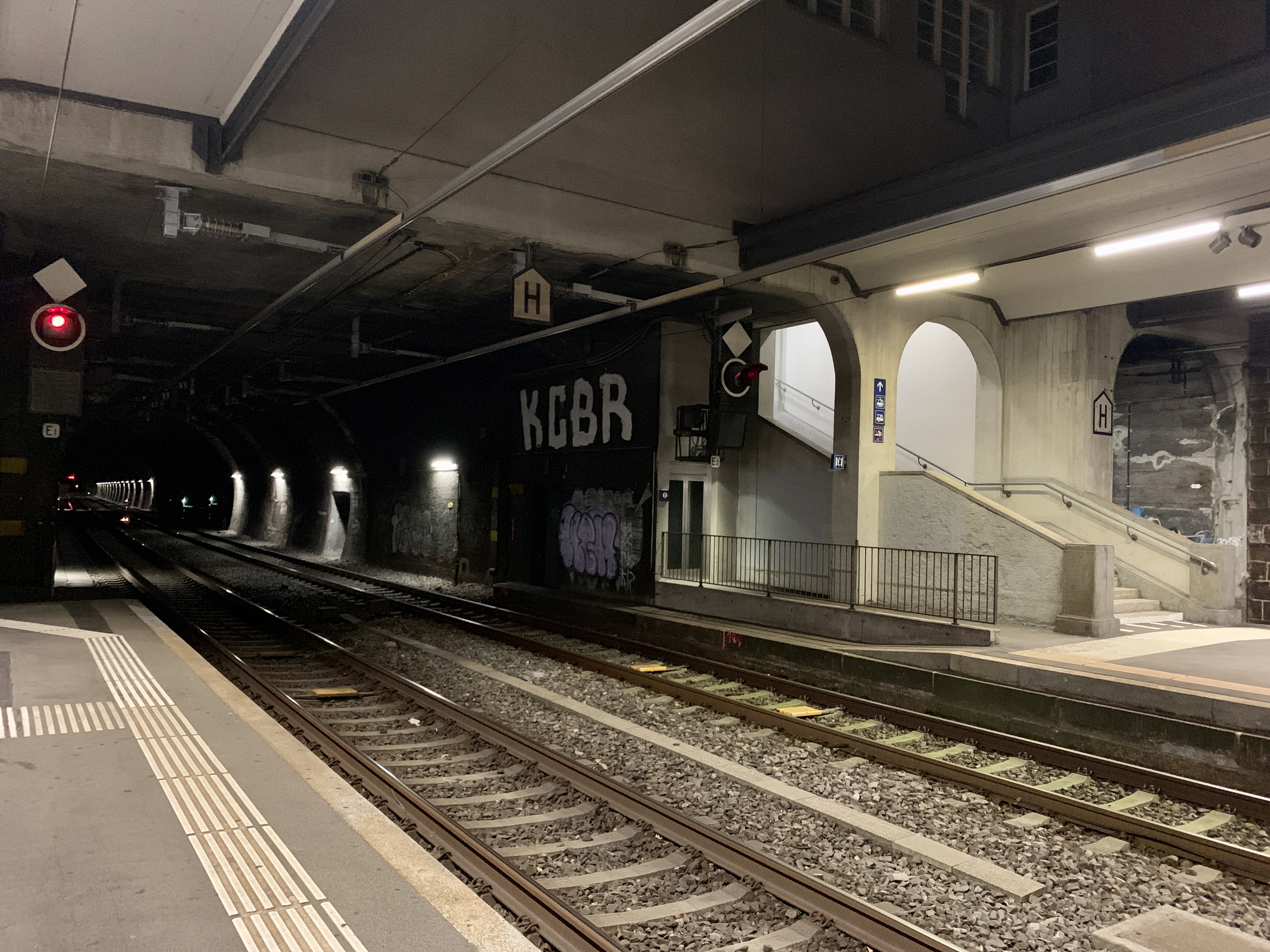
Southern end of platforms, entrance to Ulmberg tunnel

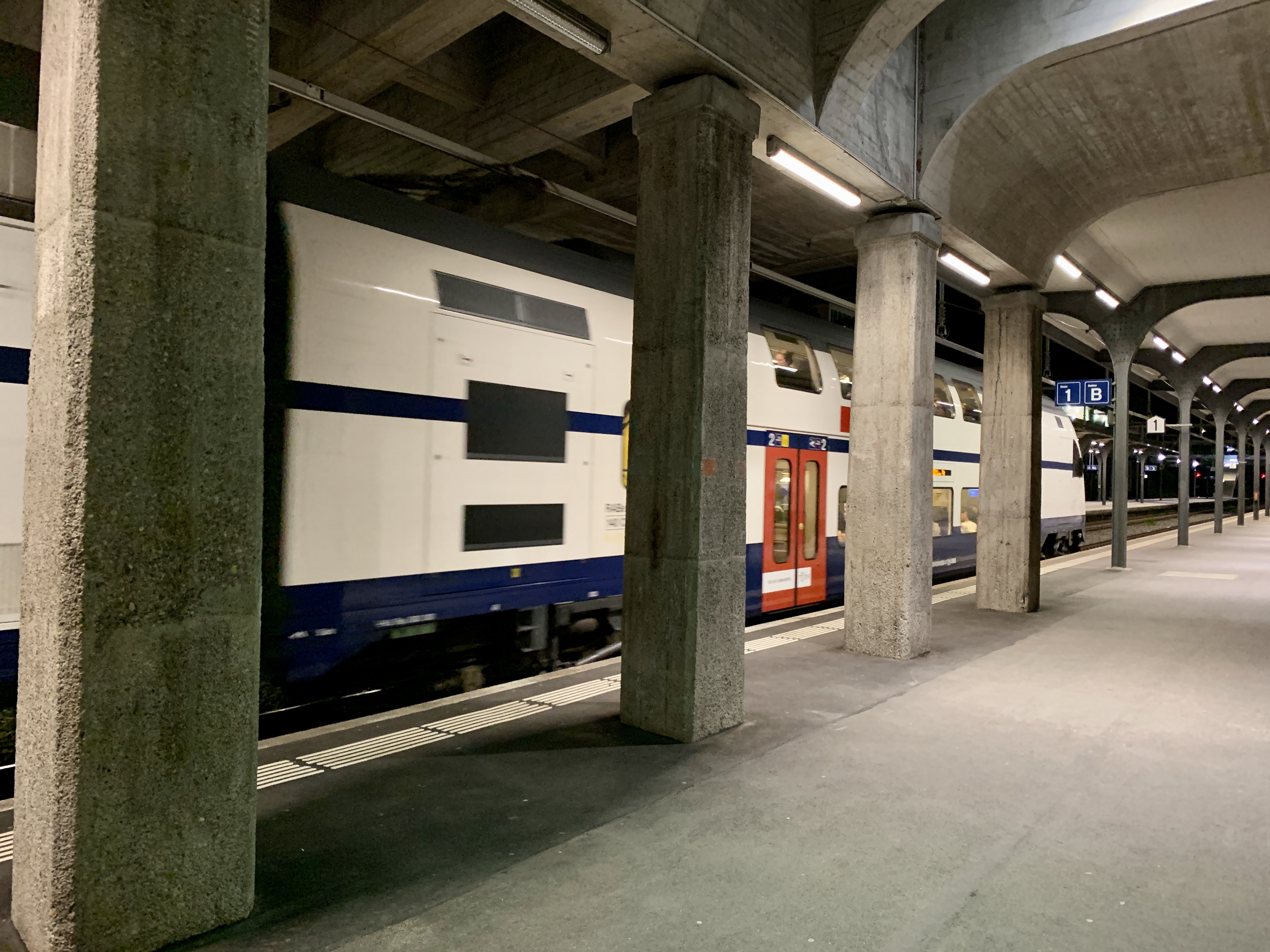
Station's platform

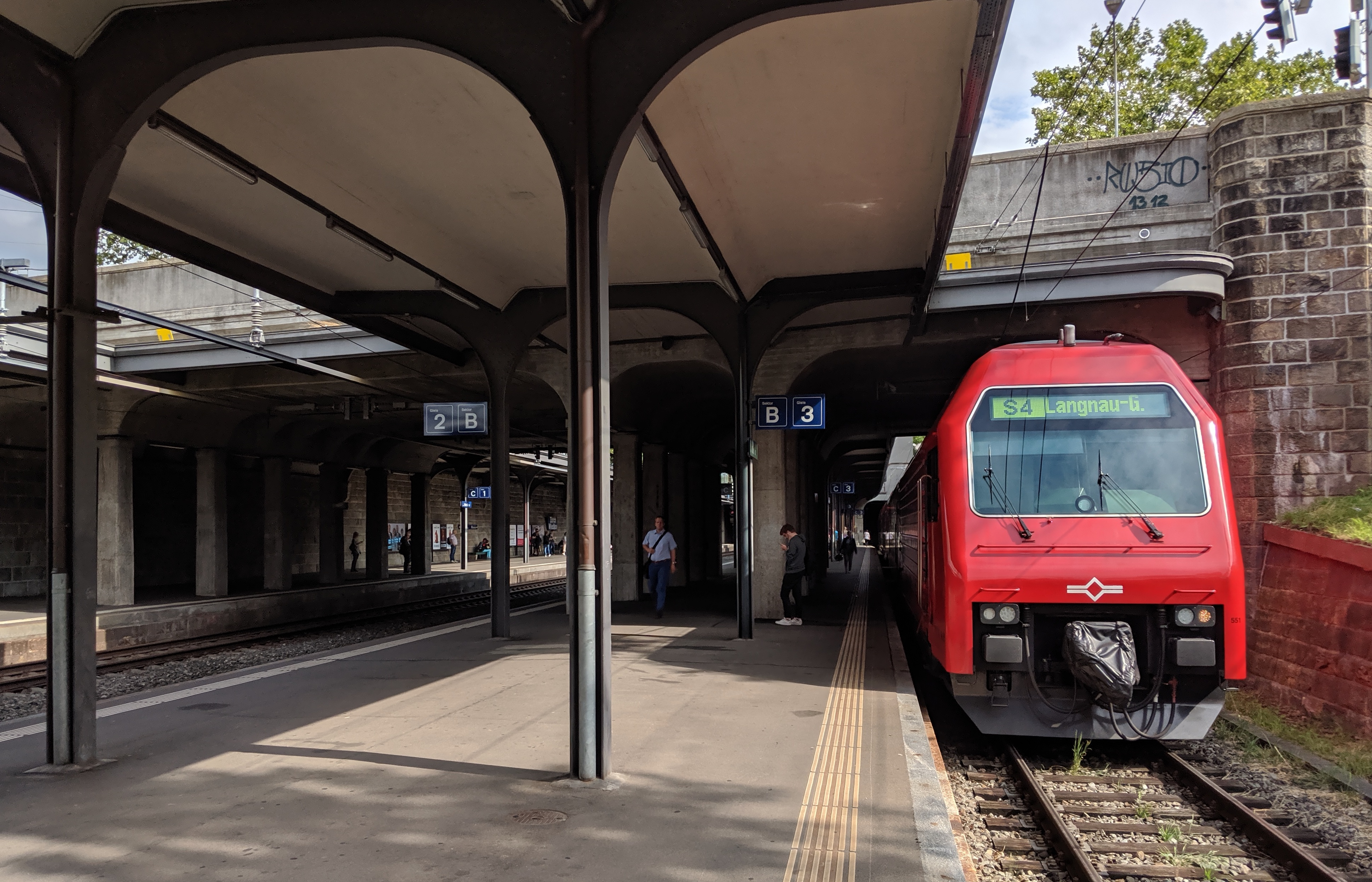
Diverted S4 service of SZU at Wiedikon station (using the connector to Zürich Giesshübel railway station)

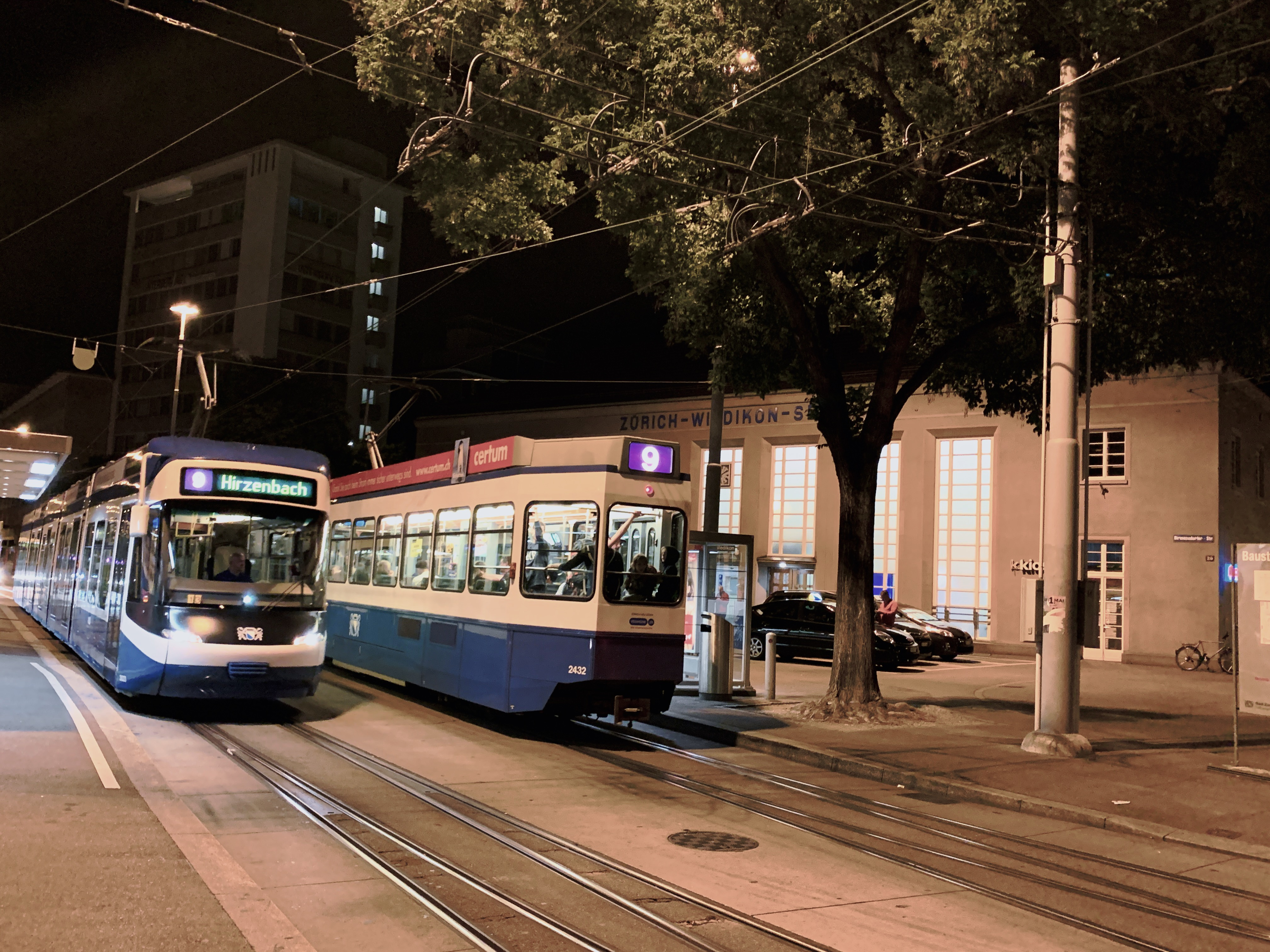
Bahnhof Wiedikon tram stop

== See also ==
- List of railway stations in Zurich
- Public transport in Zurich
- Rail transport in Switzerland
