= Kilchberg railway station =

Railway station in Switzerland

Kilchberg
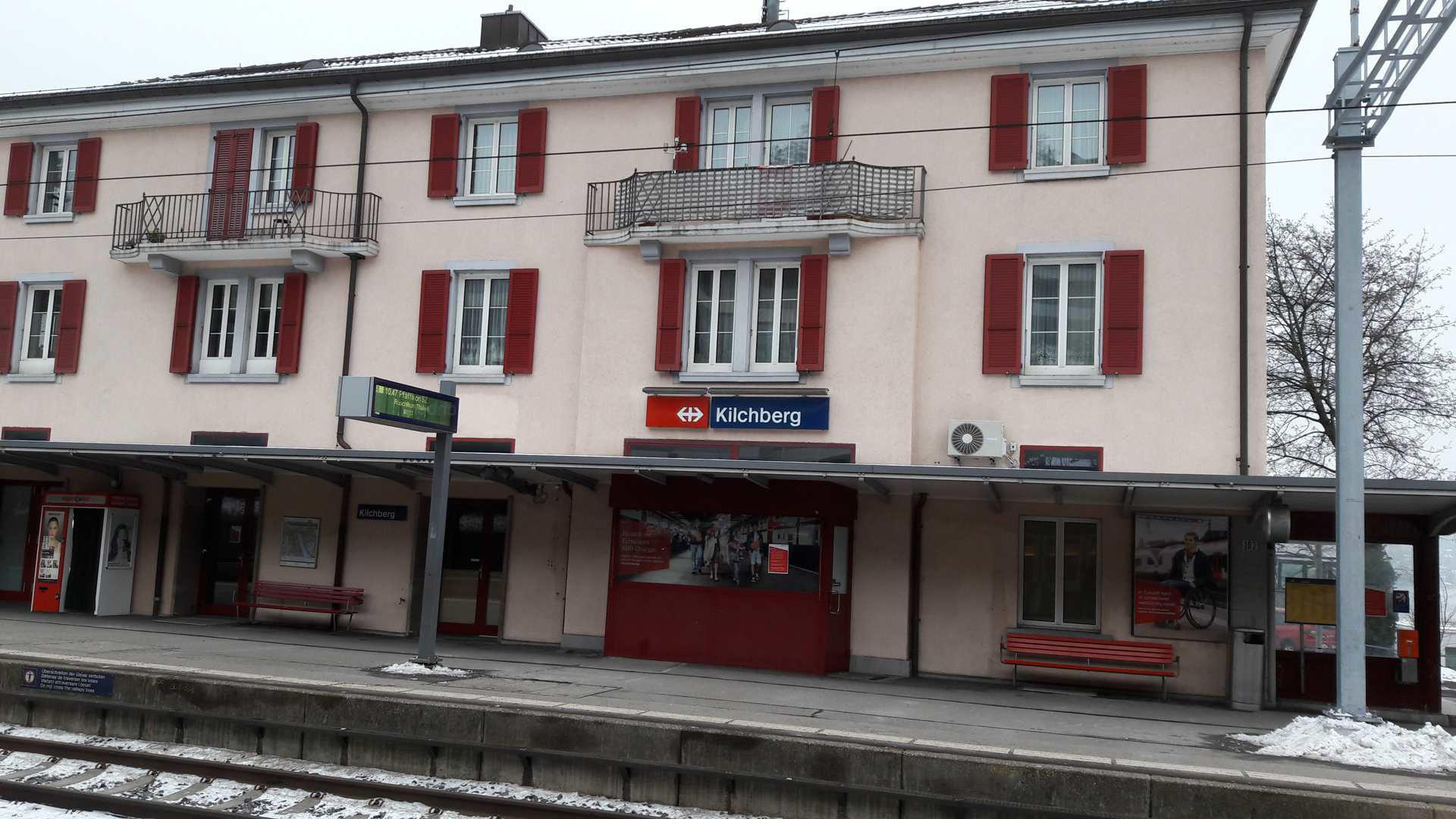
- The station building in 2018

General information
- Location: Kilchberg; Switzerland
- Coordinates: 47°19′28″N 8°32′53″E
- Elevation: 424 m (1,391 ft)
- Owner: Swiss Federal Railways
- Line: Lake Zurich left-bank line
- Platforms: 2 side platforms
- Tracks: 2
- Train operators: Swiss Federal Railways
- Connections: ZVV
- Ship: ZSG ship lines
- Bus: VBZ bus lines 162 163

Other information
- Fare zone: ZVV 150

Services
Preceding station	Zurich S-Bahn	Following station
Zürich Wollishofen towards Winterthur	S8	Rüschlikon towards Pfäffikon SZ
Zürich Wollishofen towards Thayngen or Weinfelden	S24	Rüschlikon towards Zug
Zürich Wollishofen towards Pfäffikon ZH	SN8 Limited service	Rüschlikon towards Lachen
Location
- Location within Switzerland Location within Canton of Zürich

Kilchberg railway station is a railway station in Switzerland, situated near to the banks of Lake Zurich in the municipality of Kilchberg, within fare zone 150 of the Zürcher Verkehrsverbund (ZVV). The station is located on the Lake Zurich left bank line, which originally formed part of the Zürich to Lucerne main line, although most main line trains now use the alternative Zimmerberg Base Tunnel routing. It is served by lines S8 and S24 of the Zurich S-Bahn.

== Services ==
=== Rail ===
As of the December 2023 timetable change, the following services call at Kilchberg (the S2 service passes through):

- S8: half-hourly service between Winterthur and Pfäffikon SZ.
- S24: half-hourly service between Winterthur and Zug; trains continue from Winterthur to either Thayngen or Weinfelden.

During weekends, there is a nighttime S-Bahn service (SN8) offered by ZVV:

- SN8: hourly service between Pfäffikon ZH and Lachen via Zürich HB.

=== Bus and boat ===
There is a bus stop next to the station building, which served by VBZ bus routes 162 and 163.

There is also a nearby landing stage of Zürichsee-Schifffahrtsgesellschaft (ZSG), from whre ships run either in direction to Zurich Bürkliplatz or Rapperswil/Schmerikon, serving the terminals of several lakeside towns and Ufenau island en route.

== See also ==
- Rail transport in Switzerland
