= Thalwil railway station =

Railway station in Switzerland

Thalwil
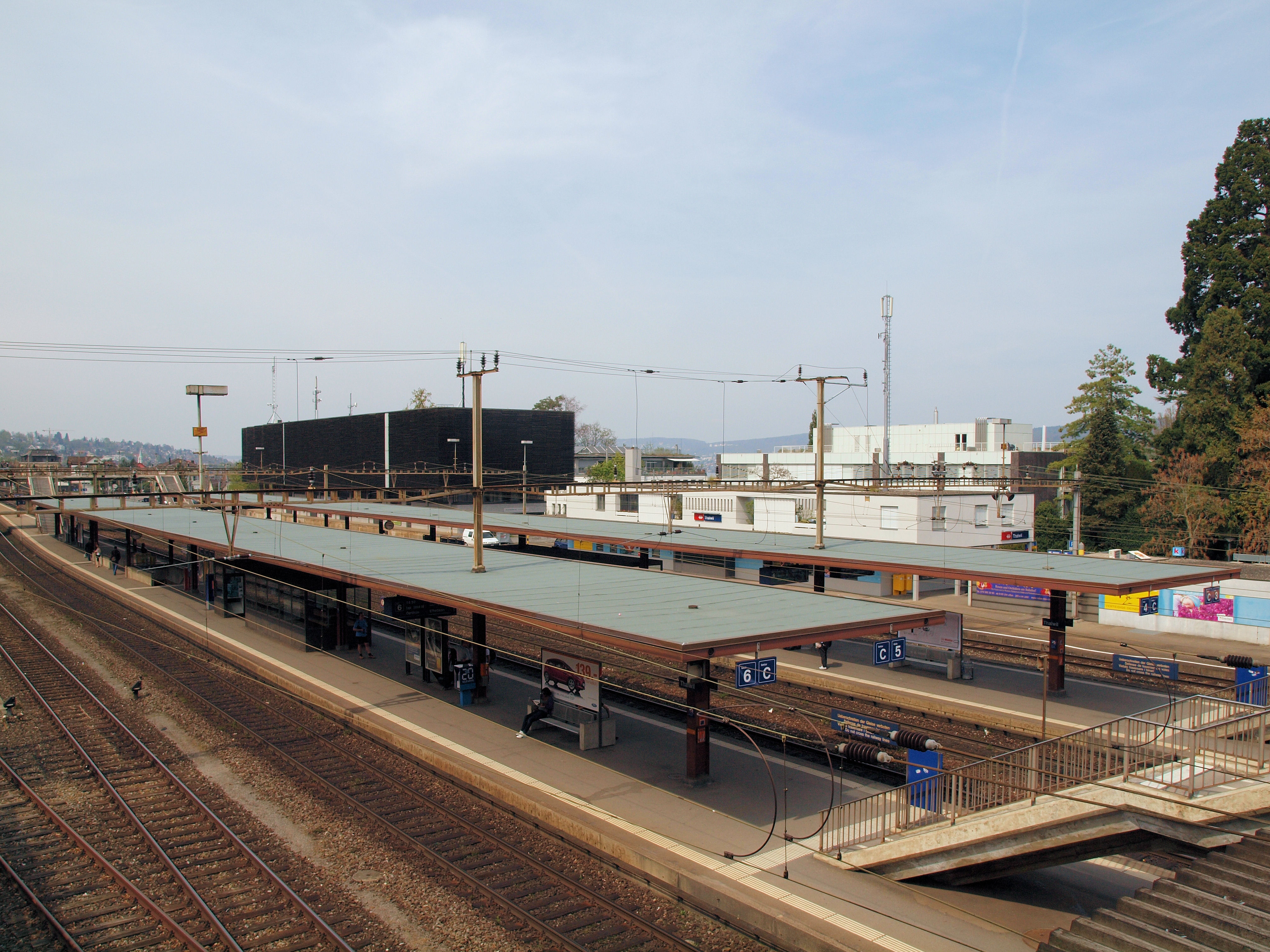
- The station in 2010

General information
- Location: Thalwil; Switzerland
- Coordinates: 47°17′45″N 8°33′53″E
- Elevation: 435 m (1,427 ft)
- Owner: Swiss Federal Railways
- Lines: Lake Zurich left-bank line; Thalwil–Arth-Goldau line
- Distance: 12.1 km (7.5 mi) from Zürich HB
- Platforms: 2 island platforms, 1 side platform
- Tracks: 7
- Train operators: Südostbahn; Swiss Federal Railways
- Connections: ZVV
- Ship: ZSG ship lines
- Bus: PostAuto bus line 240; Zimmerbergbus routes 140 142 145 156

Other information
- Fare zone: 150 (ZVV)

Passengers
- 2025: 17,700 per day (SBB, SOB)
- Rank: 45 out of 1,095 (Note: Tied with Interlaken Ost railway station.)

Services
Preceding station	SBB CFF FFS	Following station
Zürich HB towards Konstanz	IR 75	Baar towards Lucerne
Preceding station	Südostbahn	Following station
Zürich HB towards Bern	IR 35 Aare Linth	Wädenswil towards Chur
Preceding station	Zurich S-Bahn	Following station
Zürich Enge towards Zurich Airport	S2	Horgen towards Ziegelbrücke
Rüschlikon towards Winterthur	S8	Oberrieden towards Pfäffikon SZ
Rüschlikon towards Thayngen or Weinfelden	S24	Oberrieden Dorf towards Zug
Rüschlikon towards Pfäffikon ZH	SN8 Limited service	Oberrieden towards Lachen
Location
- Location within Switzerland Location within Canton of Zürich

Thalwil railway station (German: Bahnhof Thalwil) is a railway station in the municipality of Thalwil in the Swiss canton of Zurich. The station is located within fare zone 150 of the Zürcher Verkehrsverbund (ZVV).

Thalwil is a junction station, situated on the Lake Zurich left bank (Zurich to Chur) main line and the Thalwil–Arth-Goldau railway, part of the Zurich to Lucerne line. To the Zurich side of the station, the Zimmerberg Base Tunnel diverges from the original lakeside line, whilst on the Lucerne side is the junction point where the Zurich to Chur and Zurich to Lucerne lines diverge. Thus all trains on both lines must pass through the station.

== Services ==
=== Rail ===
Thalwil railway station is served by two hourly long-distance InterRegio (IR) services, one between Bern and Chur, and one between Lucerne and Konstanz (Germany), both via Zurich. The station is also served by regional trains of the Zurich S-Bahn, lines S2, S8, and S24. EuroCity (EC) and InterCity (IC) trains do not call at Thalwil.

As of the December 2020 timetable change, the following services stop at Thalwil:

- InterRegio:
  - hourly service between Bern and Chur.
  - hourly service between Lucerne and Konstanz.
- Zurich S-Bahn:
  - S2: half-hourly service between Zürich Airport and Ziegelbrücke.
  - S8/S24: service every fifteen minutes to Winterthur and Pfäffikon SZ, every half-hour to Zug, and every hour to Thayngen or Weinfelden.

During weekends (Friday and Saturday nights), there is also a nighttime S-Bahn service (SN8) offered by ZVV.

- Nighttime S-Bahn (only during weekends):
  - SN8: hourly service between Pfäffikon ZH and Lachen (via Zürich HB)

=== Bus ===
Thalwil railway station is served by buses of Zimmerbergbus, and PostAuto. While PostAuto buses depart from a bus station next to the railway station building, Zimmerbergbuses serve bus stops above the railway station, which can be reached via the bridge from all platforms.

=== Boat ===
The Zürichsee-Schifffahrtsgesellschaft (ZSG) call at a pier on the lakeside a short walking distance east to the railway station. The ships run either in direction to Zurich Bürkliplatz or Rapperswil/Schmerikon, serving the terminals of several lakeside towns and Ufenau island en route.

== Gallery ==
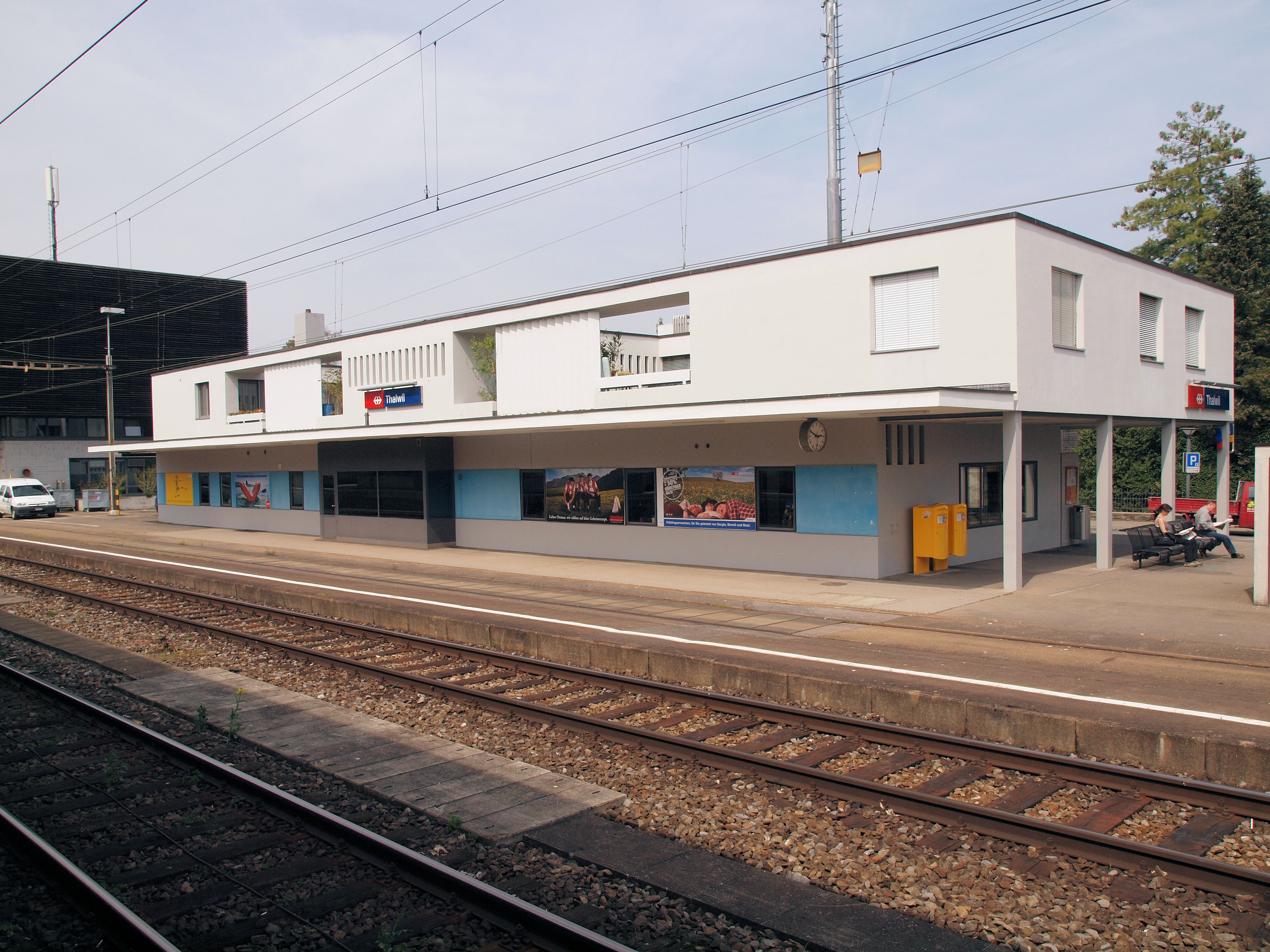
The station building

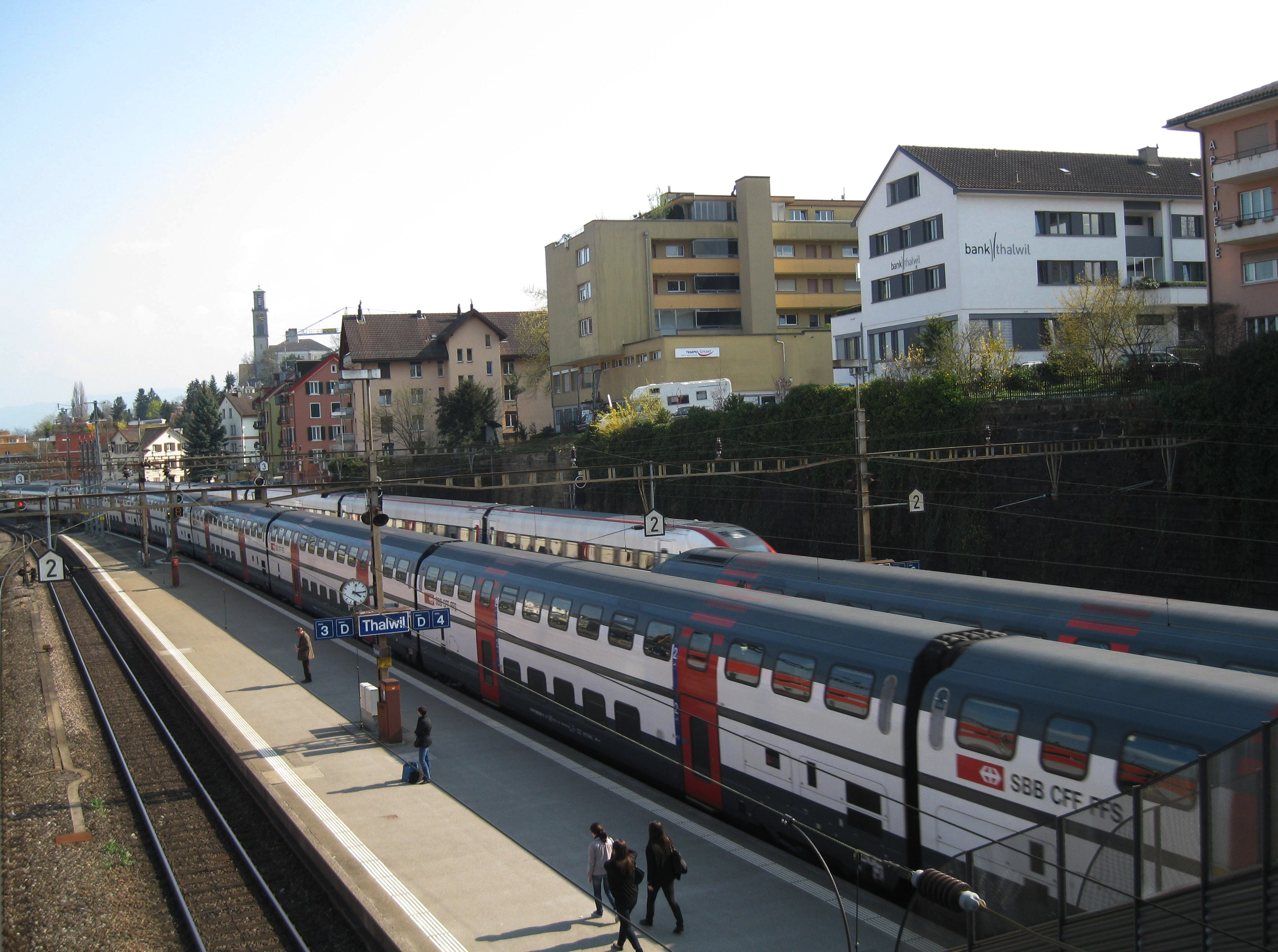
Platforms busy with trains

== See also ==
- Rail transport in Switzerland
