= Zurich Enge railway station =

Train station in Zürich, Switzerland

Zürich Enge
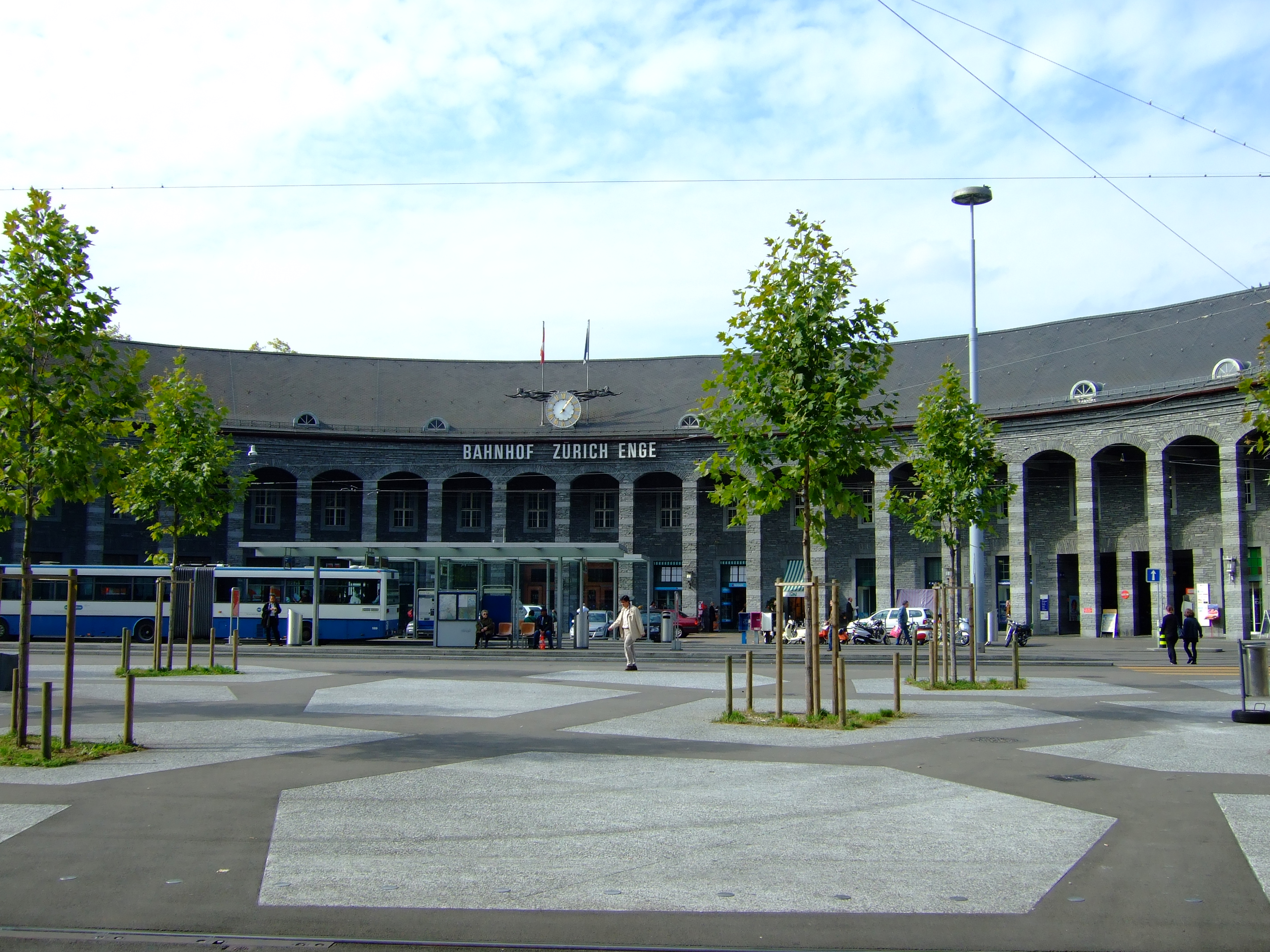
- The east facade of the station building in 2008, as seen from the redesigned Tessinerplatz

General information
- Location: Zurich; Switzerland
- Coordinates: 47°21′51″N 8°31′51″E
- Elevation: 409 m (1,342 ft)
- Owner: Swiss Federal Railways
- Line: Lake Zürich left-bank line
- Platforms: 2
- Tracks: 2
- Train operators: Swiss Federal Railways
- Connections: ZVV: Bhf. Enge
- Tram: VBZ trams 5 7 8 13
- Bus: VBZ bus line 66; PostAuto bus lines 200 210; Aargau Verkehr bus lines 444 445
- Airport: Direct lines to/from Zürich Flughafen with S2 in 0:18h and with S24 in 0:23h

Construction
- Architect: Otto Pfister and Werner Pfister (1927)

Other information
- Fare zone: ZVV 110

History
- Opened: 1875 (different location)
- Rebuilt: 1925–1927
- Former names: Bahnstation Enge

Passengers
- 2025: 15,300 per day (SBB)
- Rank: 57 out of 1,095 (Note: Tied with Rotkreuz railway station.)

Services
Preceding station	Zurich S-Bahn	Following station
Zürich Wiedikon towards Zurich Airport	S2	Thalwil towards Ziegelbrücke
Zürich Wiedikon towards Winterthur	S8	Zürich Wollishofen towards Pfäffikon SZ
Zürich Wiedikon towards Thayngen or Weinfelden	S24	Zürich Wollishofen towards Zug
Zürich Wiedikon towards Pfäffikon ZH	SN8 Limited service	Zürich Wollishofen towards Lachen
Location
- Location within Switzerland Location within Canton of Zurich

Zürich Enge railway station (German: Bahnhof Zürich Enge) is a railway station on the Zurich S-Bahn system in the southwestern part, in the Enge quarter, of the Swiss city of Zurich, within fare zone 110 of the Zürcher Verkehrsverbund (ZVV). The station is located on the Lake Zürich left bank line, although since 2003 it is bypassed by the alternative Zimmerberg Base Tunnel routing.

Although now largely confined to serving suburban trains (S-Bahn), the station has a particularly imposing semicircular facade. It is inscribed on the Swiss Inventory of Cultural Property of National Significance.

== History ==
The first Enge station opened in 1875 with the opening of the Lake Zürich left bank line. The line's original routing through the area differed from the current alignment and was largely at street level, with many level crossings. The first station was located about 200 metres (660 ft) to the south-east of the current station, close the site of the crossing of Alfred-Escher-Strasse and General-Wille-Strasse.

The current station was built between 1925 and 1927, when the line was rerouted to the west, using a lower level alignment with more tunneling. The station building is constructed of granite from the Ticino, which is noted in the naming of the front square as Tessinerplatz. The architects were the brothers Otto Pfister and Werner Pfister, who modelled the station frontage on that of Stuttgart Hauptbahnhof.

Currently, Enge station has two tracks. Originally, the station had three tracks, which carried all the traffic on both the Lake Zurich left bank line and the Zürich to Lucerne main line. These tracks were served by a side platform to the east and an island platform between the two westernmost tracks. With the opening of the alternative Zimmerberg Base Tunnel routing in 2002, most long-distance trains no longer pass through or stop at Enge station. As a consequence, the westernmost track was removed and the island platform converted to a side platform.

== Operation ==
The rail approaches to the station from both north and south are by tunnel, with the tunnel mouths at the end of the platforms. The 848 m (2,782 ft) long Ulmberg Tunnel, leading to Wiedikon, is to the north, whilst the 903 m (2,963 ft) long Enge Tunnel, leading towards Wollishofen, is to the south.

== Services ==
=== Train ===
The station is served by lines S2, S8, and S24 of the Zürich S-Bahn:

- S2: half-hourly service between Zürich Airport and Ziegelbrücke.
- S8: half-hourly service between Winterthur and Pfäffikon SZ.
- S24: half-hourly service between Winterthur and Zug; trains continue from Winterthur to either Thayngen or Weinfelden.

During weekends, there is a nighttime S-Bahn service (SN8) offered by ZVV:

- SN8: hourly service between Pfäffikon ZH and Lachen via Zürich HB.

=== Tram/Bus ===
There is a tram stop, called Bahnhof Enge, right in front of the reception building at Tessinerplatz. Another nearby stop is Bhf. Enge/Bederstrasse, where connections to both trams and buses exist. Zürich tram routes 5, 6 and 7 stop at Bahnhof Enge (Tessinerplatz), while Bhf. Enge/Bederstrasse is served by tram lines 5, 13 and 17, and bus routes 66, 200, 210, 444 and 445.

Summary of tram and bus services:

- Bahnhof Enge to the east next to the reception building at Tessinerplatz, VBZ tram lines 7 and 8
- Bhf. Enge/Bederstrasse via northern access to the platforms, VBZ tram lines 5 and 13, VBZ bus route 66, PostAuto bus lines 200 and 210, and Aargau Verkehr bus lines 444 and 445

== Gallery ==
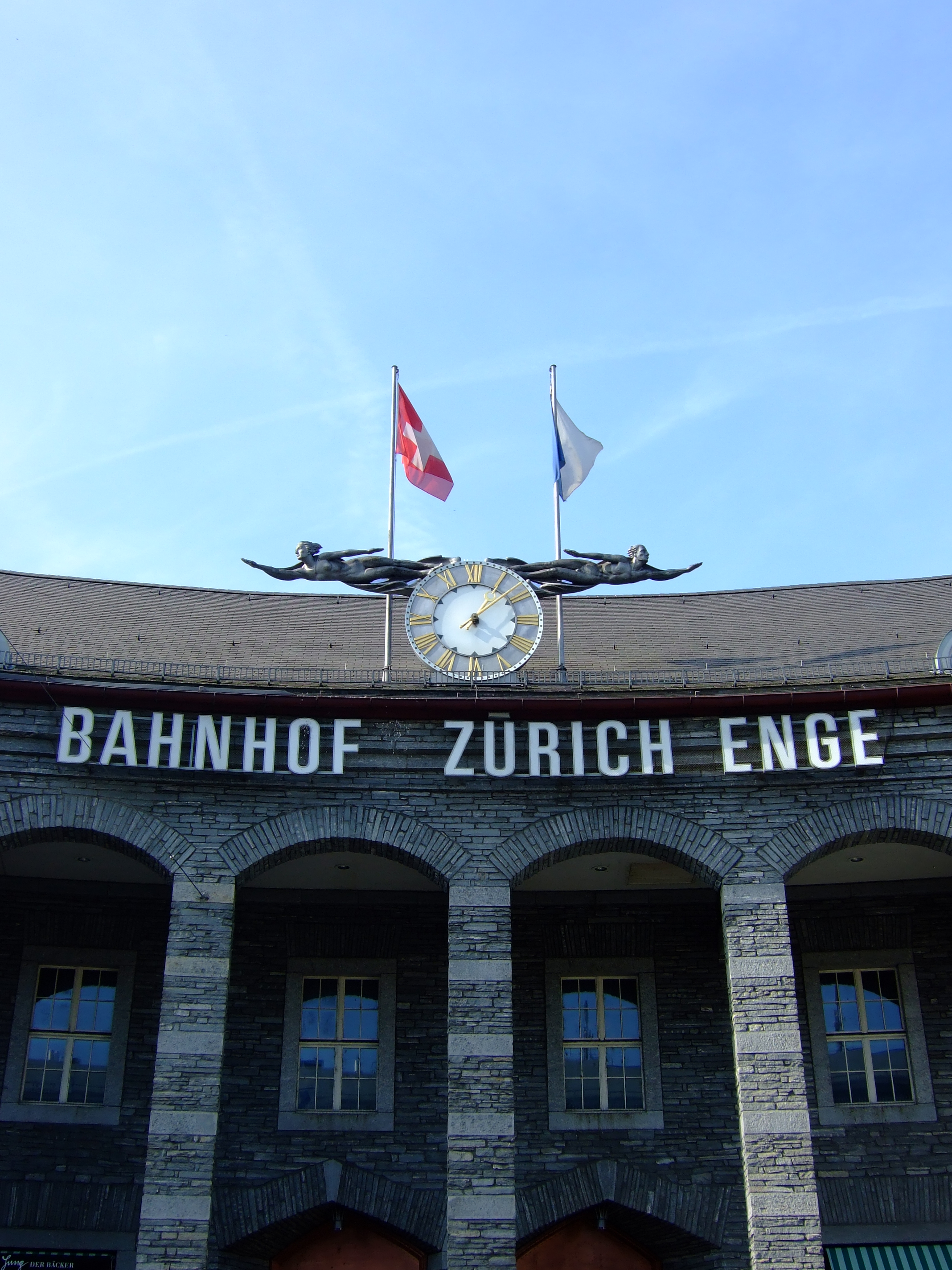
Clock at the station front

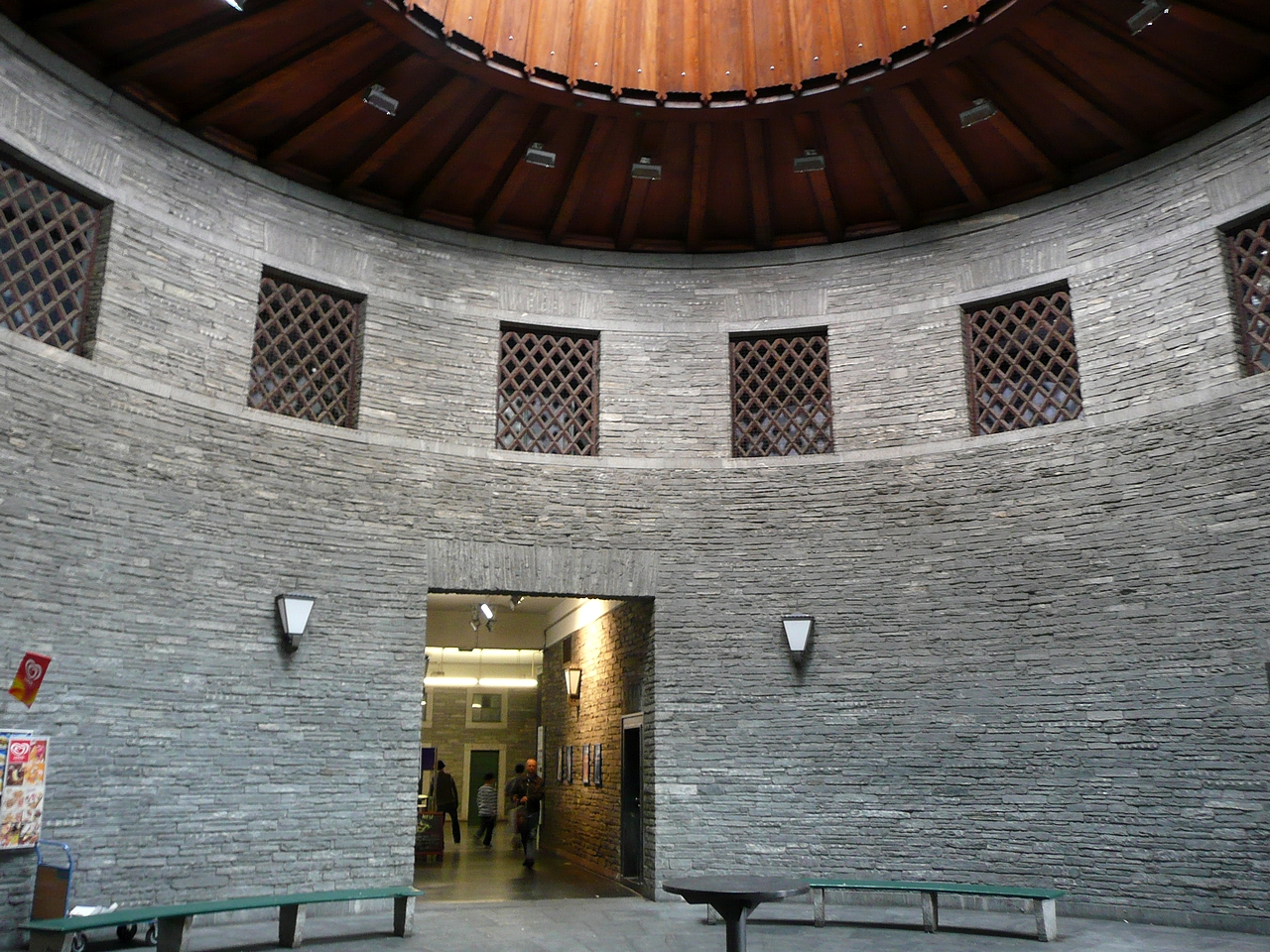
The station interior

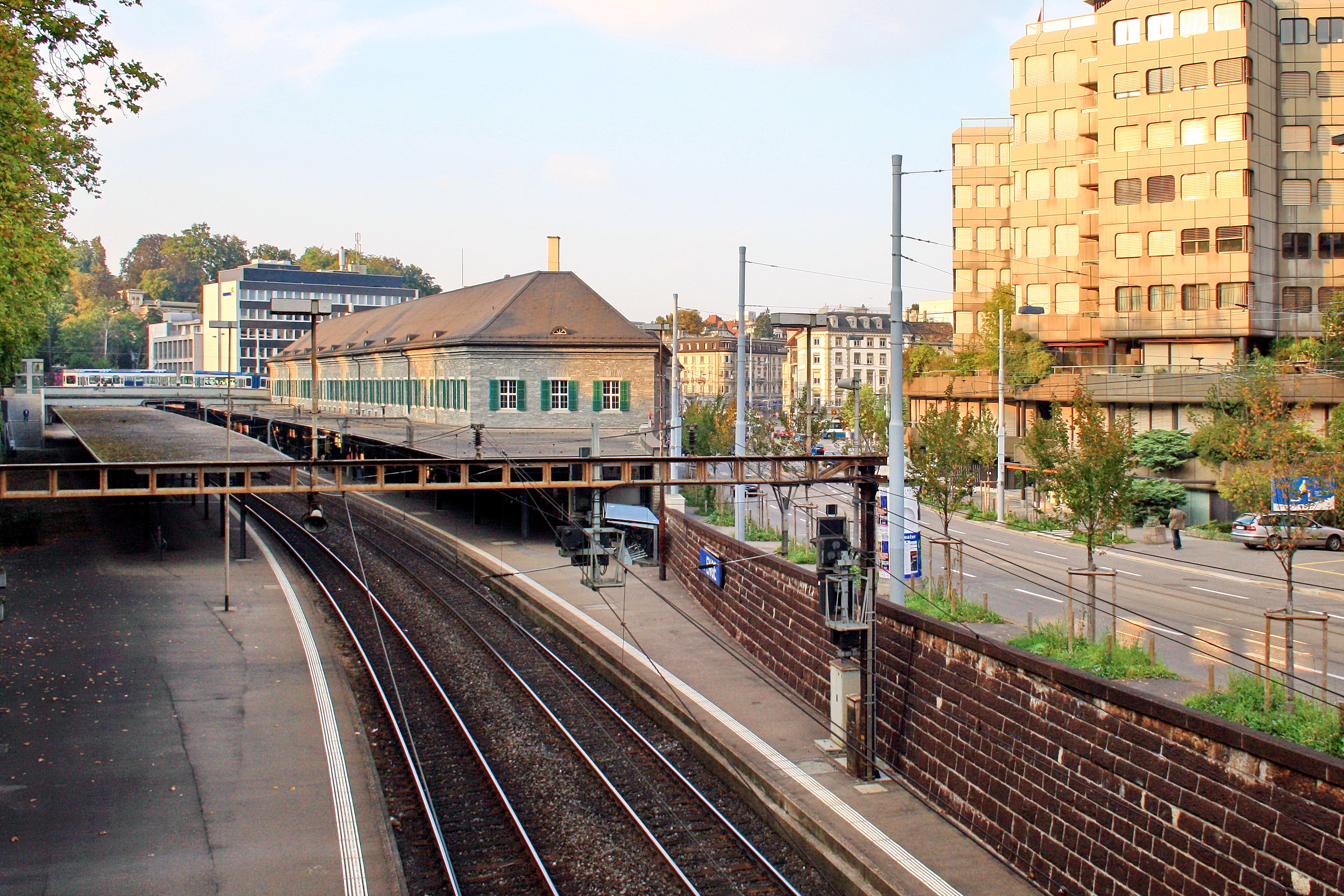
The station platforms (bed of former track 3 to the left)

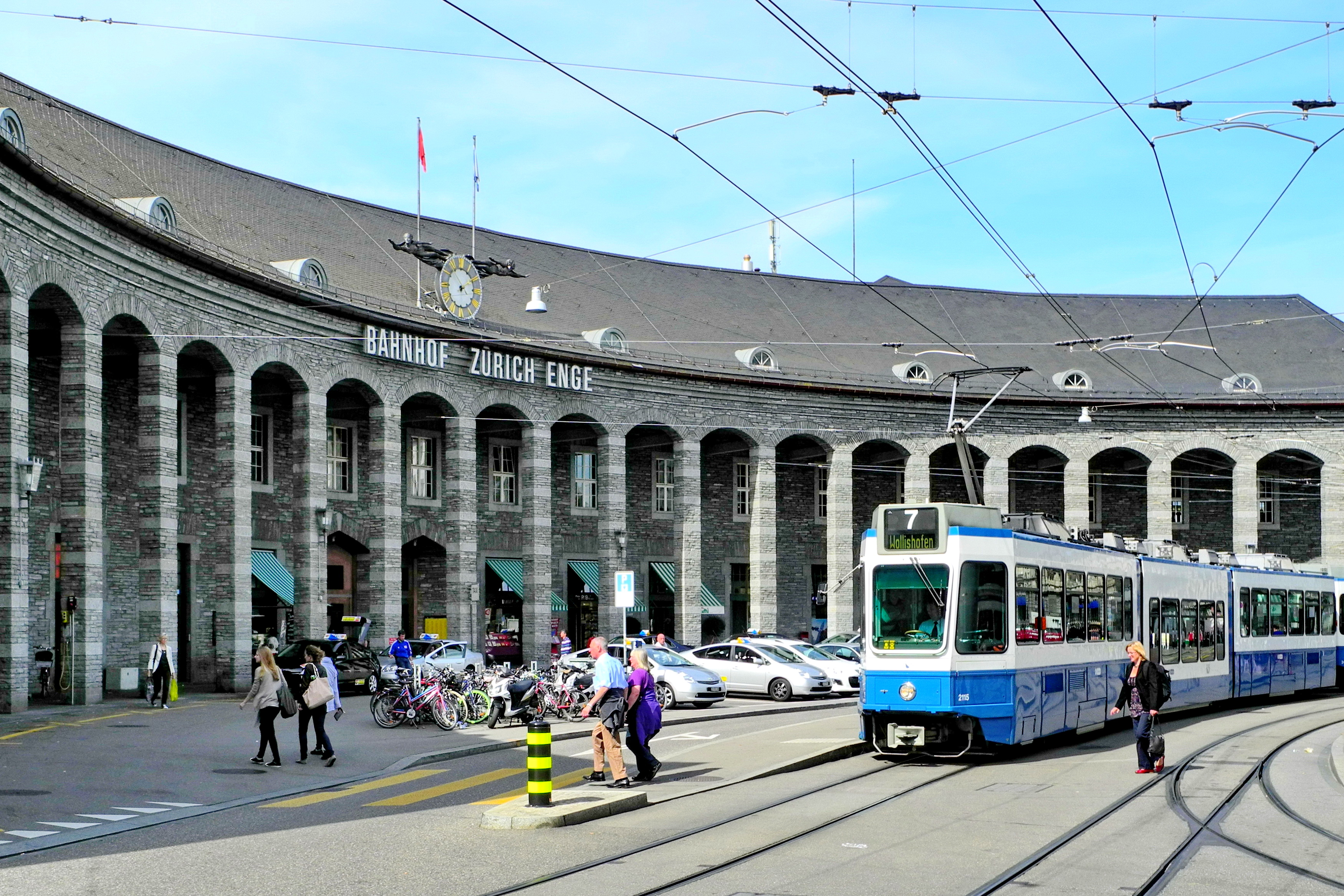
Bahnhof Enge tram stop at Tessinerplatz

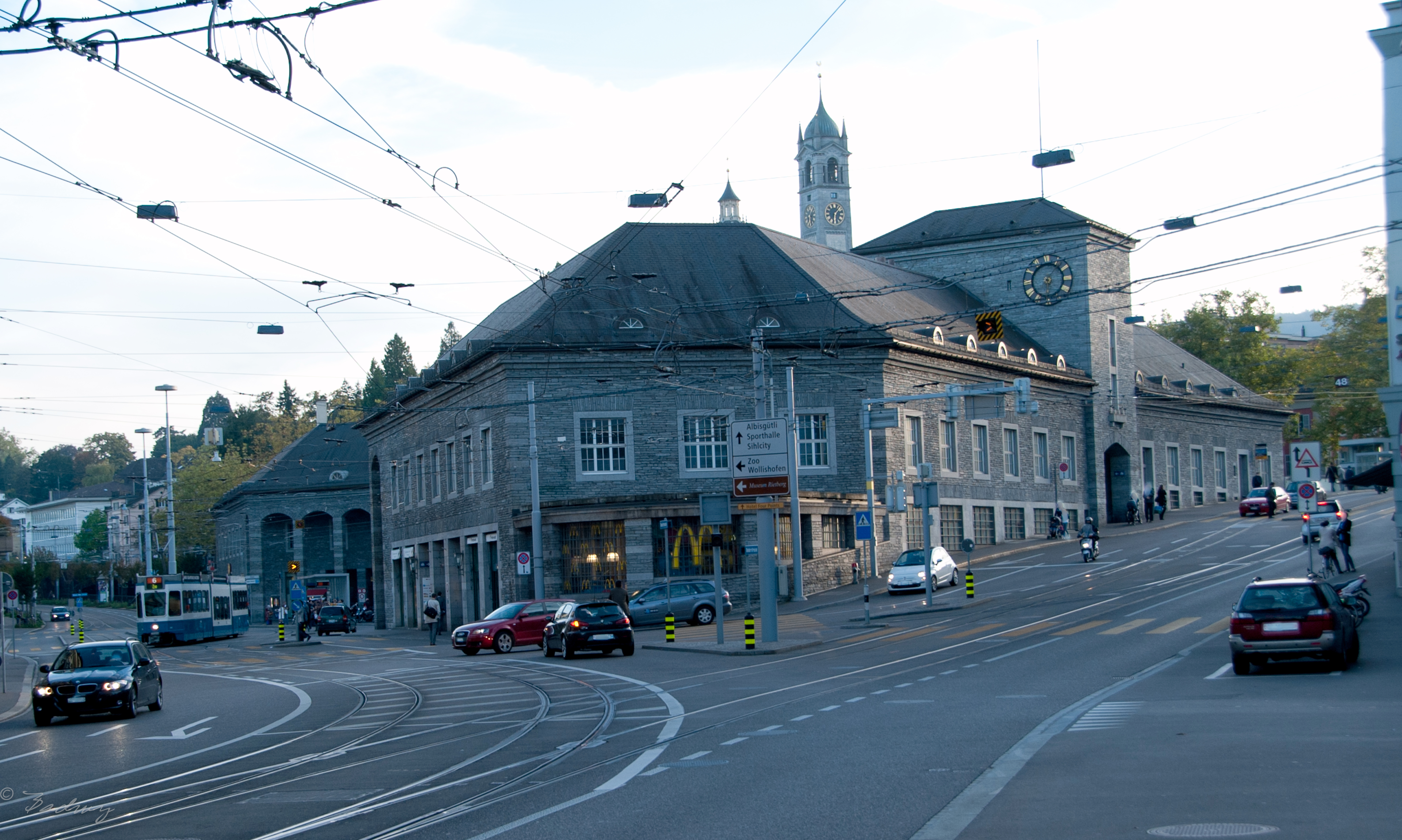
Station building with Bahnhof Enge tram stop (left) and Bhf. Enge/Bederstrasse tram/bus stop (right)

== See also ==
- List of railway stations in Zurich
- Public transport in Zurich
- Rail transport in Switzerland
