= SN8 =

- overnight service of line S8 (ZVV)
- one of high-altitude prototypes of SpaceX Starship. It was destroyed during a test fight
