= Zimmerberg (disambiguation) =

Zimmerberg may refer to:

- Zimmerberg, a mountain and a region located in the district of Horgen in the canton of Zurich, Switzerland
- Zimmerberg Base Tunnel, a railway tunnel in Switzerland
- Zimmerberg bus line, a bus line network in the canton of Zürich in Switzerland
