= S24 (ZVV) =

Railway service in Switzerland

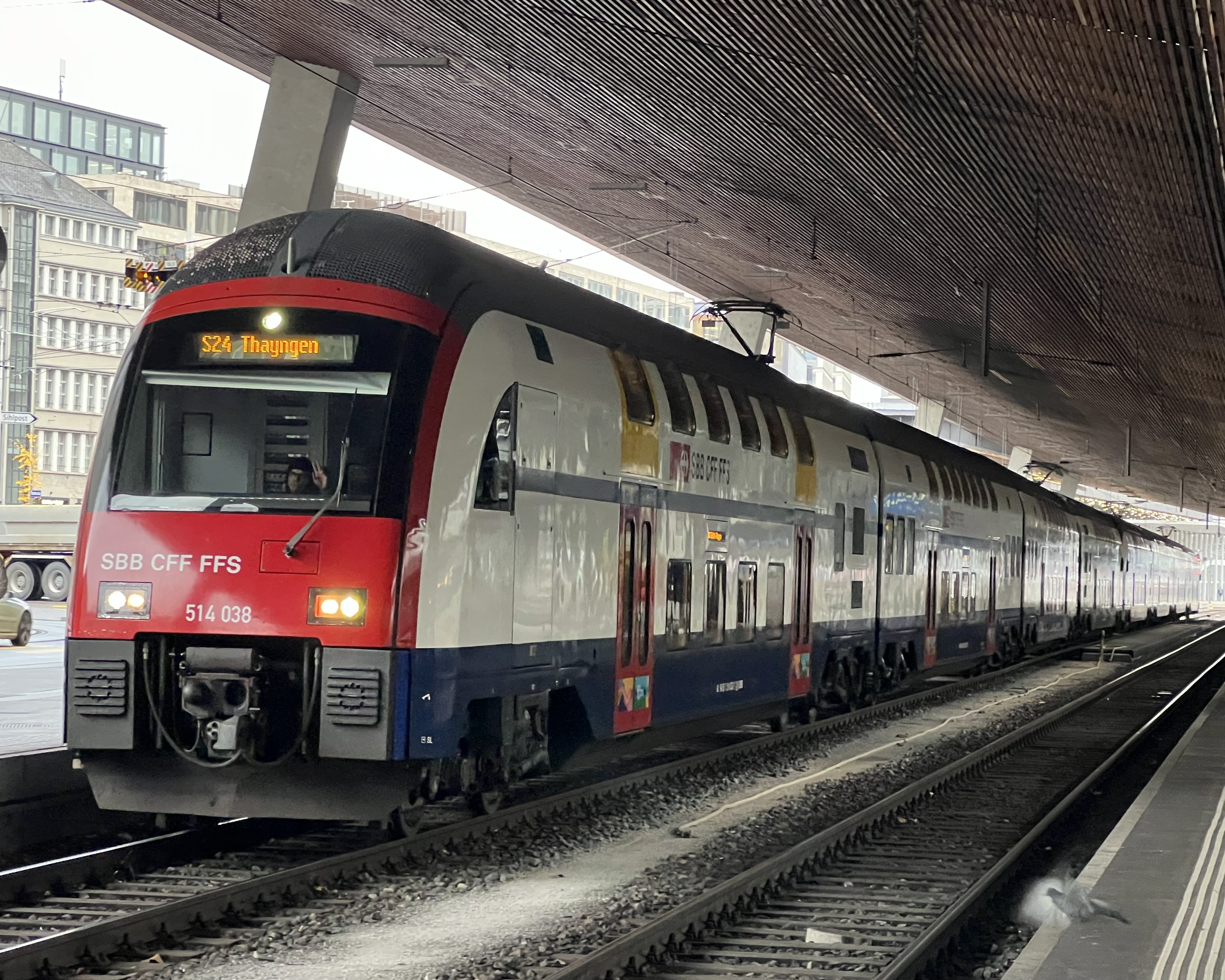
- An S24 train in the Zürich Hauptbahnhof

Overview
- Status: Operational
- Locale: Zürich, Switzerland
- Termini: Thayngen/Weinfelden; Zug
- Stations: 33
- Website: ZVV (in English)

Service
- Type: S-Bahn
- System: Zürich S-Bahn
- Operator: Zürcher Verkehrsverbund (ZVV)

Technical
- Track gauge: 1,435 mm (4 ft 8 1/2 in)

Zürich S-Bahn network as of December 2018

The S24 is a regional railway line of the Zurich S-Bahn of the Zürcher Verkehrsverbund (ZVV), Zurich transportation network. The line was significantly extended in June 2014, and again in December 2015, and has subsumed the former S21 line, initially numbered S1, which previously provided service in parts of its extended route.

At Zürich HB, trains of the S24 service usually depart from ground-level tracks (Gleis) 3 or 4. As of 2025, it is one of the only S-Bahn service that reverses direction of travel in one of the surface-level terminal tracks instead of passing through one of the station's underground platforms.

== Route ==
- S24 Thayngen/Weinfelden–Winterthur–Zürich Flughafen –Wipkingen–Zürich HB–Thalwil–Zug
  Services stop in Kemptthal until 9:20 PM; the lines to Thayngen and Weinfelden are operated alternately at hourly intervals; stops between Neuhausen and Winterthur only in Andelfingen.

The line runs from Zug to Thayngen and Weinfelden via Thalwil, Zürich Hauptbahnhof, Zürich Flughafen and Winterthur. The service is accelerated between Neuhausen and Winterthur as well as between Baar and Zug where only the most important stops are served. The following stations are served:

== Stations ==
=== Stations served by trains on the S24 Weinfelden branch ===
- Weinfelden (TG)
- Märstetten
- Müllheim-Wigoltingen
- Hüttlingen-Mettendorf
- Felben-Wellhausen
- Frauenfeld
- Islikon
- Rickenbach-Attikon
- Wiesendangen (ZH)
- Oberwinterthur
- Winterthur

=== Stations served by trains on the S24 Thayngen branch ===
- Thayngen
- Herblingen
- Schaffhausen
- Neuhausen
- Andelfingen
- Winterthur

=== Stations served by all S24 trains ===
- Winterthur
- Kemptthal
- Effretikon
- Bassersdorf
- Zürich Flughafen
- Zürich Oerlikon
- Zürich Wipkingen
- Zürich Hauptbahnhof (reverse of direction of travel)
- Zürich Wiedikon
- Zürich Enge
- Zürich Wollishofen
- Kilchberg
- Rüschlikon
- Thalwil
- Oberrieden Dorf
- Horgen Oberdorf
- Baar
- Zug

== Rolling stock ==
Most trips are operated using Re 450 locomotives, with three double-decker passenger cars per locomotive. Sometimes RABe 514 electric multiple units are used instead. Up to three such sets of four cars compose one S24 train. Each set sometimes terminates at a different destination.

== Scheduling ==
Trains normally operate every half-hour between Winterthur and Zug, with alternate trains starting from Thayngen and Weinfelden. The trip between Thayngen and Zug takes 1 hour 53 minutes. It takes 1 hour 47 minutes for the alternate train between Weinfelden and Zug.

== History ==
Before June 2014, S24 referred to a shorter line, running only between Zürich Hauptbahnhof and Horgen Oberdorf. This overlapped with the former S21 service, which connected Thalwil and Zug. Prior to 2012, the S21 also served Sihlbrugg station, situated between Baar and Horgen, which permanently closed that year. The former S21 was originally designated S1 until the opening of the Stadtbahn Zug in December 2004. Because the latter also includes an S1 service, the S1 of ZVV changed its number to S21.

In 2014, the route of the S24 was extended at its southern end to Zug in replacement of the former S21, which was then discontinued (not to be confused with the current S21, which was introduced later and uses a different route). At its northern end, the S24 was extended to Zürich Oerlikon in order to provide service to Zürich Wipkingen station, which lost its previous service by lines S2, S8 and S14 when they were diverted to use the Weinberg Tunnel. In late 2015, the S24 was further extended from Zürich Oerlikon to Zürich Flughafen, Winterthur, Schaffhausen and Thayngen, in order to replace service by the S16 which was curtailed to Zürich Airport.

In December 2021, the stop in Kemptthal was swapped from the S7 to the S24, to improve stability and punctuality in the very busy Winterthur-Effretikon part. In the evenings from 9:20 p.m., when the S24 only runs on the Zug–Effretikon section, the S7 keeps stopping in Kemptthal.

Between 10 December 2023 and 14 December 2024, the entire section between Zürich HB and Zürich Wipkingen was out of service due to construction work. During this time, trains of S24 service operated only between Wipkingen and Thayngen/Weinfelden and between Zürich HB and Zug.

== See also ==
- Rail transport in Switzerland
- List of railway stations in Zurich
- Public transport in Zurich
- ZVV fare zones
