= S8 (ZVV) =

Railway service in Switzerland

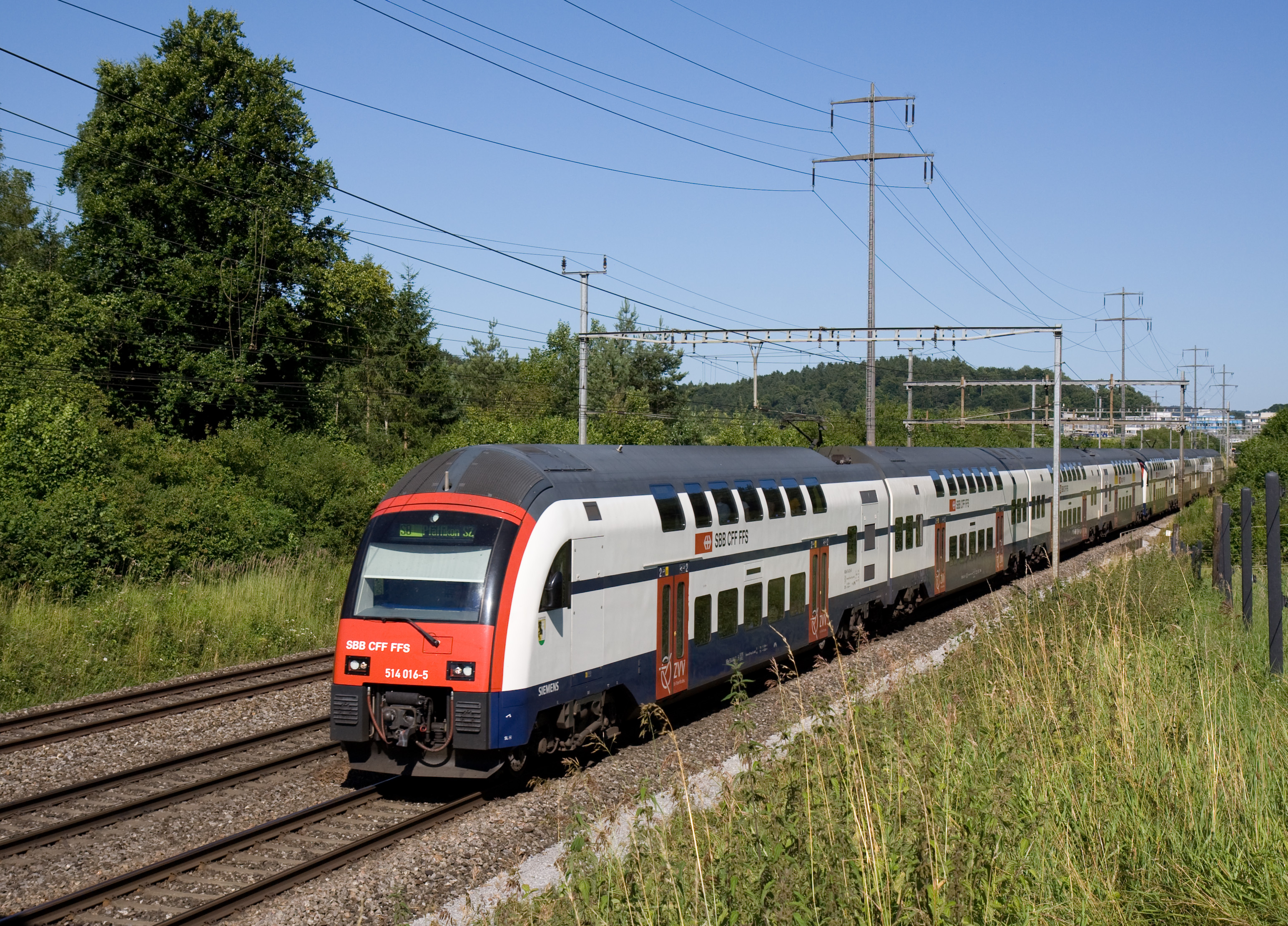
- S8 service near Effretikon.

Overview
- Status: Operational
- Locale: Zürich, Switzerland
- Termini: Winterthur; Pfäffikon (SZ)
- Stations: 21
- Website: ZVV (in English)

Service
- Type: S-Bahn
- System: Zürich S-Bahn
- Operator(s): Zürcher Verkehrsverbund (ZVV)
- Rolling stock: RABe 514 class

Technical
- Track gauge: 1,435 mm (4 ft 8 1/2 in)

The S8 is a regional railway line of the S-Bahn Zürich on the Zürcher Verkehrsverbund (ZVV), Zürich transportation network, and is one of the network's lines connecting the cantons of Zürich and Schwyz.

Zürich S-Bahn network as of December 2018

At Zürich HB, trains of the S8 service usually depart from underground tracks (Gleis) 31–34 (Löwenstrasse station).

== Route ==
- S8 Winterthur–Wallisellen–Oerlikon–Zürich HB–Thalwil–Pfäffikon SZ (–Ziegelbrücke)
  Operates non stop between Winterthur and Effretikon; first and last services extended to Ziegelbrücke.

The line runs from Winterthur via Oerlikon and the Weinberg Tunnel to Zürich Hauptbahnhof and continues on the left shore of Lake Zurich (over the Lake Zürich left-bank railway line) to Pfäffikon (SZ).

The line's overnight service (SN8), operating on weekends after midnight, runs between Zürich HB and Lachen (SZ).

== Stations ==
- Winterthur
- Effretikon
- Dietlikon
- Wallisellen
- Zurich Oerlikon
- Zurich Hauptbahnhof
- Zurich Wiedikon
- Zurich Enge
- Zurich Wollishofen
- Kilchberg
- Rüschlikon
- Thalwil
- Oberrieden
- Horgen
- Au ZH
- Wädenswil
- Richterswil
- Bäch
- Freienbach SBB
- Pfäffikon (SZ)

== Rolling stock ==
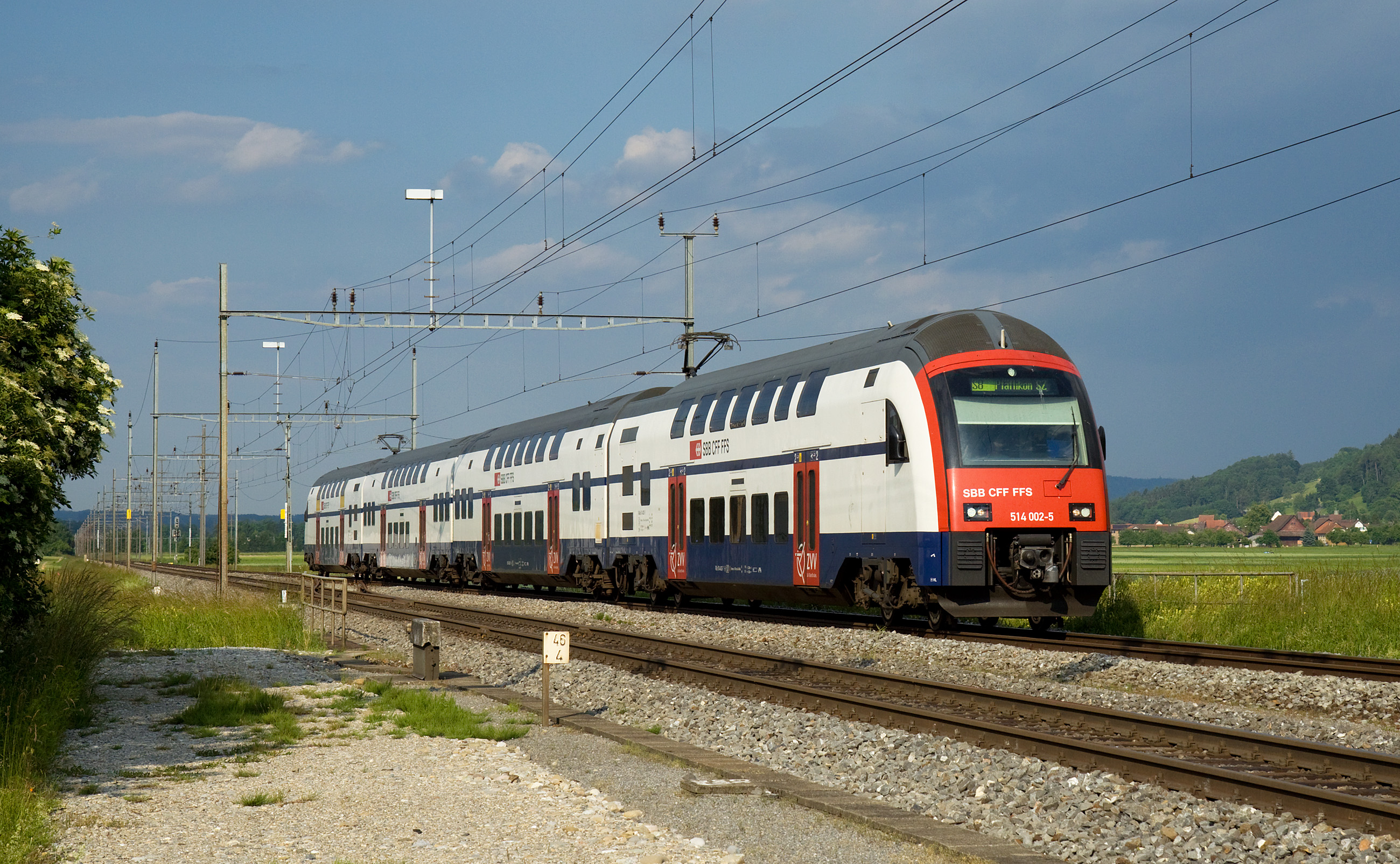
RABe 514 EMU as S8 service near Felben-Wellhausen

As of the December 2022 timetable change, most services are operated with RABe 514 class trains.

== Scheduling ==
The train frequency on the S8 is usually one train every 30 minutes and the trip takes 68 minutes.

== History ==
Originally, the S8 operated between Zürich Oerlikon and Zürich Hauptbahnhof (Zurich main station) via Zürich Wipkingen (through the Wipkingen Tunnel). The S8 reversed directions at Zurich main station. With the opening of the Weinberg Tunnel on 15 June 2014 and simultaneous timetable change, the route was changed to its current state.

== See also ==
- Rail transport in Switzerland
- List of railway stations in Zurich
- Public transport in Zurich
- ZVV fare zones
