= Thayngen railway station =

Railway station in Switzerland

Thayngen
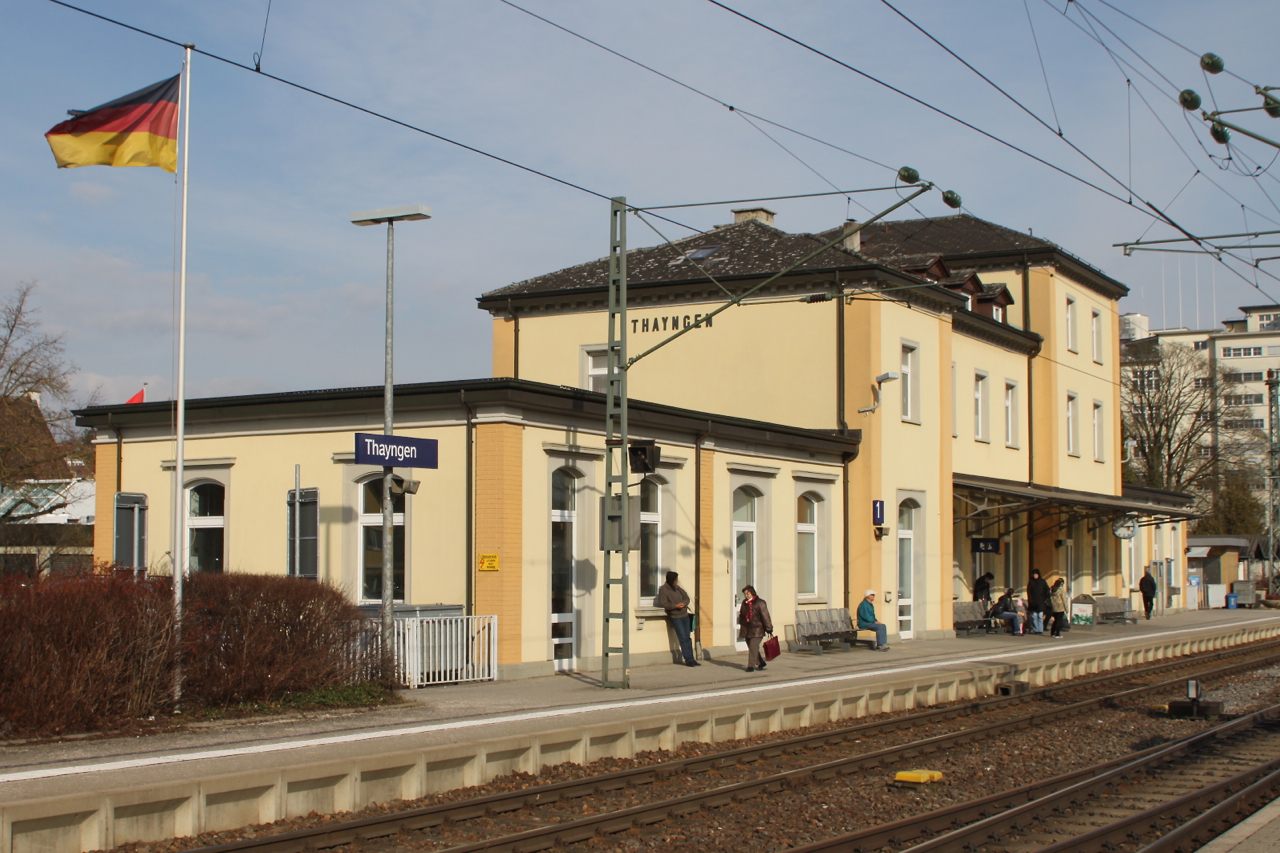
- The station in 2010

General information
- Location: Bahnhofstrasse; Thayngen, Schaffhausen; Switzerland
- Coordinates: 47°44′44″N 8°42′12″E
- Elevation: 440 m (1,440 ft)
- Owner: Bundeseisenbahnvermögen (since 1994); Grand Duchy of Baden State Railway (1863-1920), Deutsche Reichsbahn (1920-1949), Deutsche Bundesbahn (1949-1993)
- Lines: High Rhine Railway (KBS 730)
- Distance: 373.0 km (231.8 mi) from Mannheim Hauptbahnhof
- Platforms: 1 island platform; 1 side platform
- Tracks: 3
- Train operators: SBB GmbH; Swiss Federal Railways
- Connections
- Bus: vbsh 24
- Airport: Direct line to/from Zürich Flughafen with S24 in 0:59h or with other connections and changes

Other information
- Fare zone: 820 (Tarifverbund Ostwind)

History
- Opened: 1863

Services
Preceding station	Schaffhausen S-Bahn	Following station
Herblingen towards Schaffhausen	S62	Bietingen towards Singen (Hohentwiel)
Preceding station	Zurich S-Bahn	Following station
Herblingen towards Zug	S24	Terminus
Location
- Location within Switzerland Location within Canton of Schaffhausen

Thayngen railway station (German: Bahnhof Thayngen) is a railway station in the Swiss canton of Schaffhausen and municipality of Thayngen. Although the station is in Switzerland, it is located on the Deutsche Bahn's High Rhine Railway that links Basel to Singen.

Thayngen station is served by SBB GmbH/THURBO (until 2022 Deutsche Bahn) regional trains between Schaffhausen and Singen (Hohentwiel) and Zurich S-Bahn line S24 trains Between Zug and Thayngen (via Zurich).

== Customs ==
Thanyngen is, for customs purposes, a border station for passengers arriving from Germany. Customs checks may be performed in the station or on board trains by Swiss officials. Systematic passport controls were abolished when Switzerland joined the Schengen Area in 2008.

== Services ==
As of the December 2022 timetable change, the following S-Bahn services stop at Thayngen station:

- Schaffhausen S-Bahn S62: half-hourly service between Schaffhausen and Singen (Hohentwiel) (some trains continue to Radolfzell).
- Zurich S-Bahn S24: hourly service to Zug.

== See also ==
- Bodensee S-Bahn
- Rail transport in Switzerland
