= Zimmerberg Base Tunnel =

Railway tunnel in northeastern Switzerland

- Interactive map of Zimmerberg Base Tunnel

Overview
- Line: Gotthard Line
- Location: Zürich, Switzerland
- Coordinates: 47.3277°N 8.5312°E
- Status: Active since 2003
- System: Swiss Federal Railways (SBB CFF FFS)
- Start: Zürich
- End: Thalwil

Operation
- Opened: April 2003
- Owner: SBB Infrastructure
- Operator: SBB CFF FFS
- Traffic: Railway
- Character: Passenger and freight

Technical
- Length: 9.4 km (5.8 mi)
- No. of tracks: 2
- Track gauge: 1,435 mm (4 ft 8 1/2 in) (standard gauge)
- Electrified: 15 kV 16.7 Hz
- Operating speed: 160 km/h (99 mph)

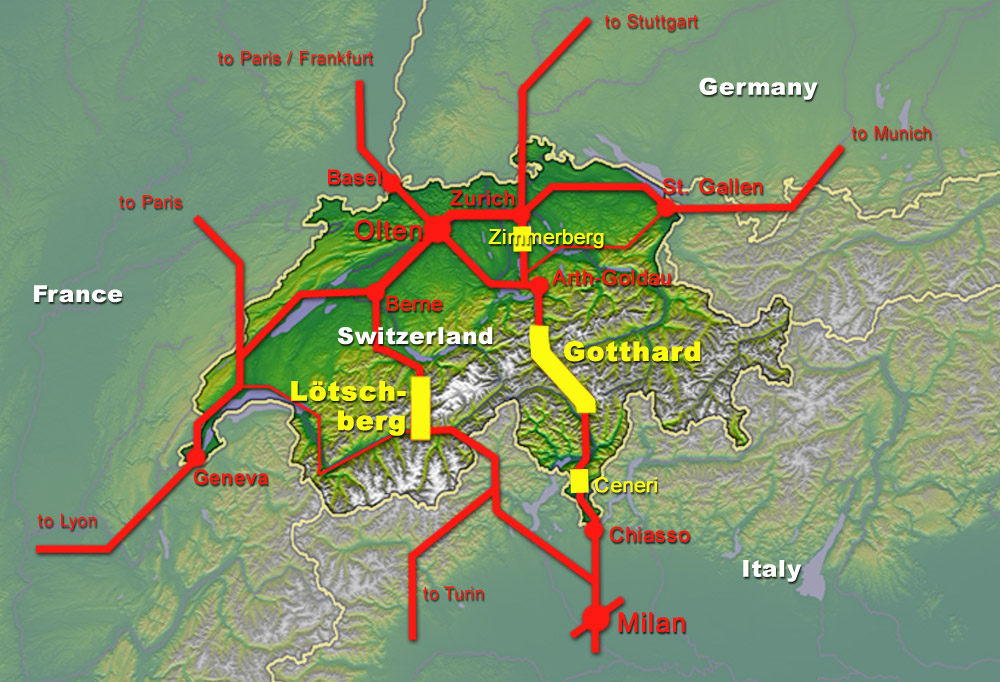
The NRLA project (Gotthard Base Tunnel and Zimmerberg Base Tunnel) is the centerpiece of the Central European rail network.

The Zimmerberg Base Tunnel (ZBT) is a railway tunnel under the Zimmerberg mountains in Switzerland. Phase I of the tunnel was opened to traffic during April 2003.

The ZBT has been divided into two phases of work; as of 2024, only Phase I is operational while Phase II remains in the planning and preparation stages. Zimmerberg I is about 10 km long; it links Zürich with Thalwil, bypassing a section of the Lake Zürich left-bank railway line, which allows rail traffic to traverse the mountains more efficiently.

== Phase I ==
During the 1990s, Switzerland embarked upon a major programme of modernization and improvements across its railway infrastructure. The NRLA initiative sought to provide better alternatives to the steep mountain railways across Gotthard, Ceneri and Lötschberg through the construction of a number of base-level tunnels that enabled trains to more rapidly and efficiently traverse the Swiss Alps. The Zimmerberg Base Tunnel (ZBT) was one such tunnel constructed under the initiative.

Phase I of the Zimmerberg Base Tunnel is a major feature of the route between Zürich and Thalwil. The tunnel was the longest double-track tunnel to have been constructed by Switzerland in over 100 years, a milestone in Swiss railway infrastructure. The tunnel was designed to accommodate high speed transit, with trains traversing at peak speeds of up to 200 km/h. The projected cost of the 10.7 km Phase I section was reportedly 820 million Swiss francs. Construction of the tunnel commenced in September 1997.

The local geography and location of the tunnel posed some challenges to the construction effort, such as the need to avoid impacting nearby urban development, as well as little cover being available at key areas. Boring operations through the rock incorporated both the use of a tunnel boring machine and conventional techniques, such as blasting, soil injection, and pipe arches amongst other auxiliary construction measures intended to reduce the risk of excessive settlement. Approximately 315 meters of the tunnel's length features a continuous grouted ceiling, which was done to reduce deformation and permeability as well as a potential loss of cover. This was created by injecting a precise mixture of cement and slurry via pressurized grouting pipes across 120,000 valves; areas were tested for potential weaknesses and promptly re-grouted where appropriate.

From an early stage of the project, the tunnel's opening was projected for June 2003. This target was met on time.

== Phase II ==
The proposed Phase II of the Zimmerberg Base Tunnel is one element of the wider Rail 2030 programme, which has an overall projected budget of 21 billion Swiss francs. However, during 2010, it was reported that further work on the project had been put on hold indefinitely. At the time, work was underway on multiple other base tunnels, including the Ceneri Base Tunnel and the Gotthard Base Tunnel.

If it is built as per the original plans, Phase II of the tunnel will bring its length to about 20 km, and will link Zürich with Zug. Even following its completion, it is planned to retain the intermediate exit to Thalwil, which would still be used by passenger and freight trains going to Chur as well as by international trains to Austria. Until Phase II is completed, capacity and speeds both remain heavily constrained by traditional routes; the Swiss Federal parliament has voted to include the work in its long term expansion plan for 2030–2035.

== See also ==
- Lötschberg Base Tunnel
- List of longest tunnels
- Treno Alta Velocità
