= Zimmerberg Tunnel =

Railway tunnel in Switzerland

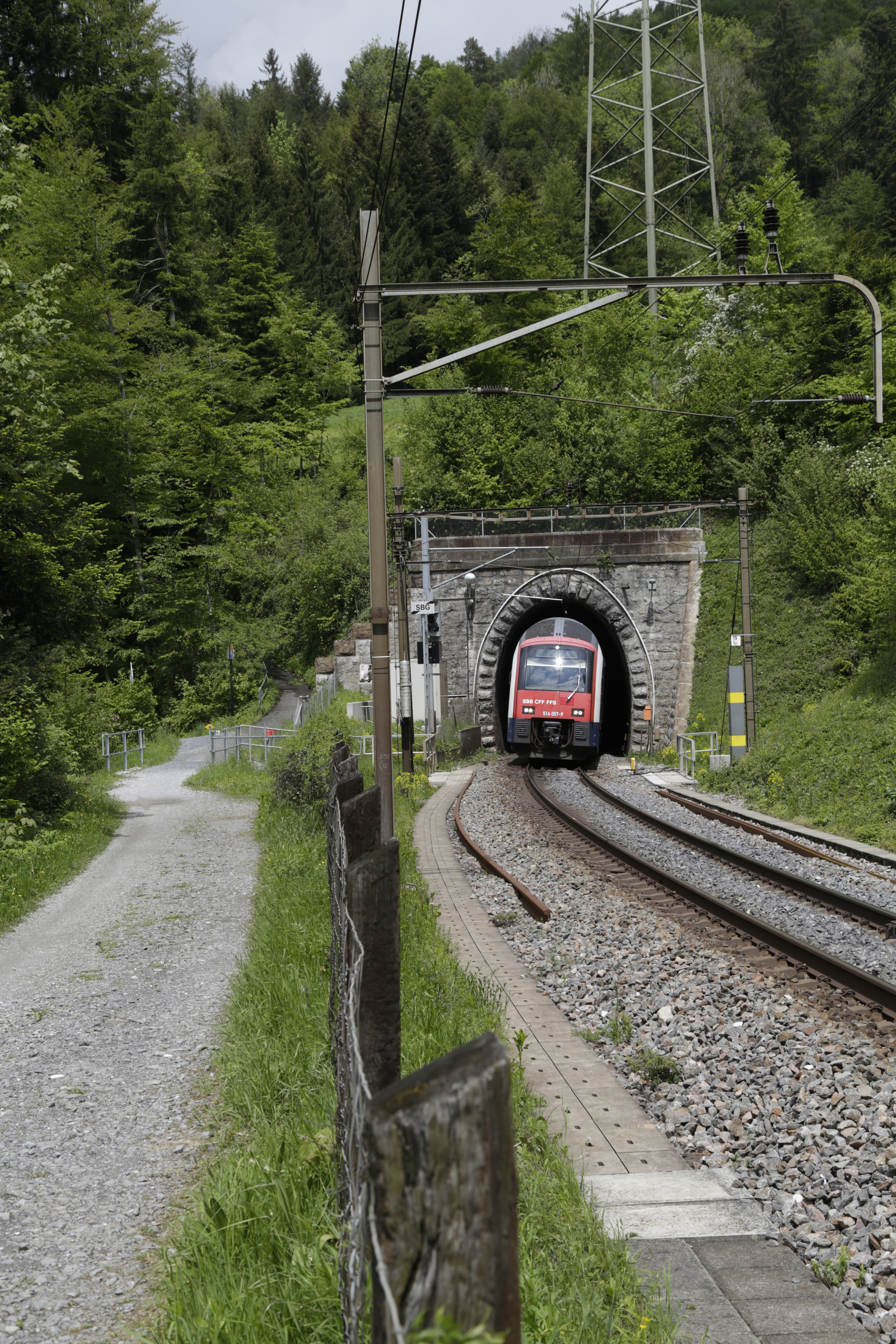
- Tunnel portal (Sihlbrugg end)
- Interactive map of Zimmerberg Tunnel

Overview
- Official name: German: Zimmerbergtunnel
- Other name: German: Horgerbergtunnel
- Line: Thalwil–Arth-Goldau railway
- Location: Zürich, Switzerland
- Coordinates: 47.2503°N 8.5853°E
- Status: Active
- System: Swiss Federal Railways (SBB CFF FFS)
- Crosses: Zimmerberg
- Start: Horgen Oberdorf
- End: Sihlbrugg

Operation
- Constructed: September 1894 – August 1896
- Opened: June 1, 1897
- Owner: SBB CFF FFS
- Operator: SBB CFF FFS
- Traffic: Train
- Character: Passenger and freight

Technical
- Length: 1,984 metres (6,509 ft) (Note: The length given for this tunnel varies by source between 1,984 metres (6,509 ft) and 1,986 metres (6,516 ft). This article uses the length given by SBB CFF FFS.)
- No. of tracks: Single
- Track gauge: 1,435 mm (4 ft 8 1/2 in)
- Electrified: 15 kV/16.7 Hz AC
- Grade: 13‰

The Zimmerberg Tunnel is a 1,984-metre (6,509 ft)-long railway tunnel under the Zimmerberg mountain in the Canton of Zurich, Switzerland which opened in 1897.

== History ==
Construction began in September 1894 from the Horgen portal. Breakthrough was achieved on 15 March 1896, and construction finished in August 1896. The tunnel was opened to traffic on 1 June 1897 along with the rest of the Thalwil–Zug railway line. On 5 February 1923, electrification of the railway line, including the tunnel, was completed.

== Operations ==
Together with the Albis Tunnel, the tunnel forms the railway passage through the Zimmerberg and Albis on the Thalwil–Arth-Goldau railway line which is an important feeder to the Gotthard railway.

The segment leading through the two tunnels constitutes a single-track section on the Thalwil–Arth-Goldau railway.

The proposed phase II of the Zimmerberg Base Tunnel aims to resolve the bottleneck formed by the single-track sections and to allow for faster traffic on the Thalwil–Arth-Goldau railway.
