= Lusser =

Lusser is a German surname. Notable people with the surname include:

- Franz Vital Lusser (1849–1927), Swiss civil engineer
- Robert Lusser (1899–1969), German aerospace engineer
