= Albis Tunnel =

Railway tunnel in Switzerland

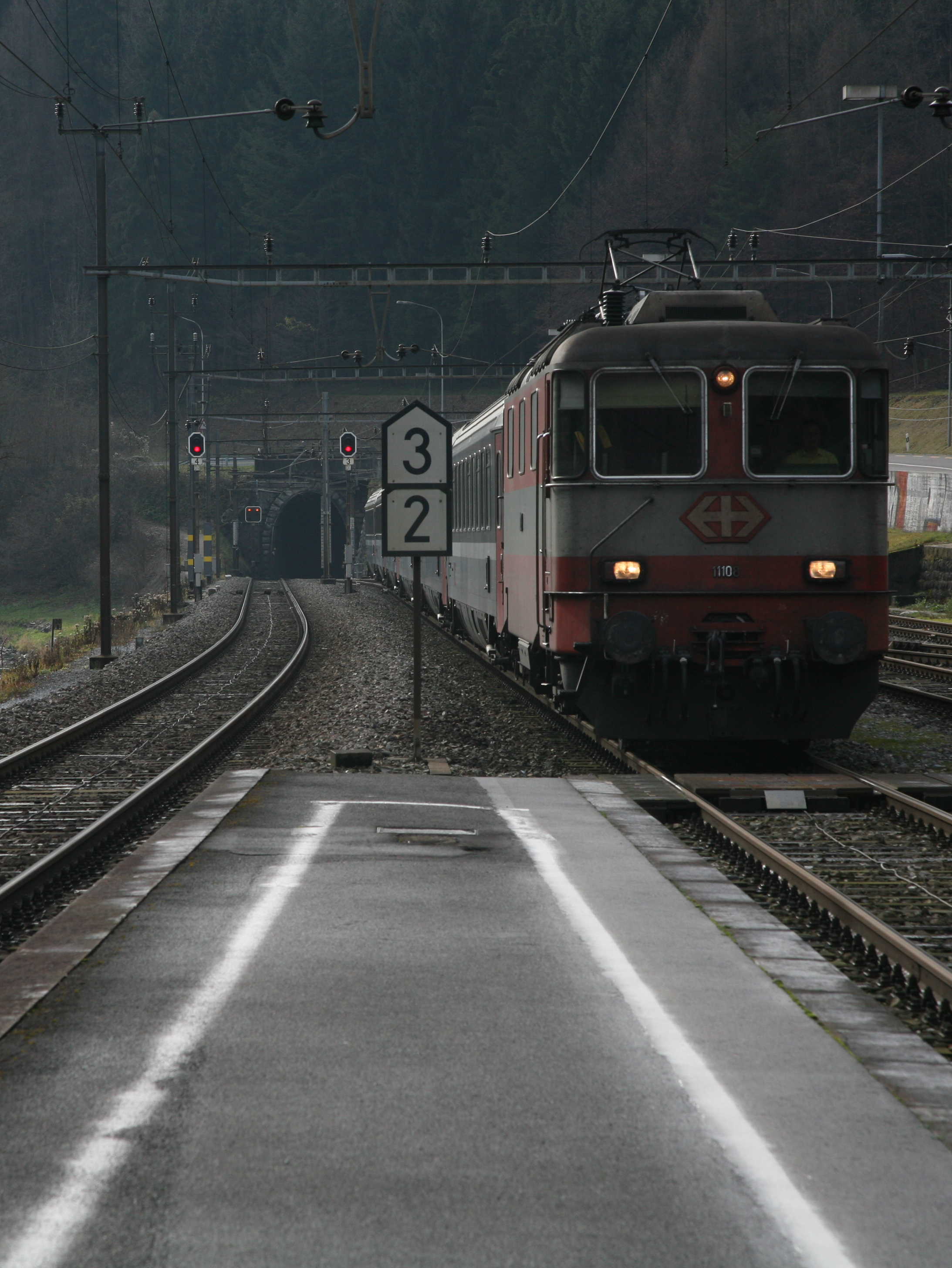
- "Swiss-Express" train leaving the Albis Tunnel as seen from Sihlbrugg railway station
- Interactive map of Albis Tunnel

Overview
- Official name: German: Albistunnel
- Line: Thalwil–Arth-Goldau railway
- Location: Zurich and Zug, Switzerland
- Coordinates: 47.2243°N 8.5589°E
- Status: Active
- System: Swiss Federal Railways (SBB)
- Crosses: Albis
- Start: Near Sihlbrugg railway station 47.2352°N 8.5746°E
- End: Litti near Baar; 47.2136°N 8.5435°E

Operation
- Constructed: December 1891 – August 1894
- Opened: June 1, 1897
- Owner: SBB
- Operator: SBB
- Traffic: Train
- Character: Passenger and freight

Technical
- Design engineer: Franz Vital Lusser
- Length: 3,360 m (11,020 ft) (Note: The length given for this tunnel varies by source between 3358 m, 3359 m, and 3360 m. This article uses the length given by SBB.)
- No. of tracks: Single
- Track gauge: 1,435 mm (4 ft 8 1/2 in)
- Electrified: 15 kV/16.7 Hz AC
- Grade: 12‰

The Albis Tunnel is a railway tunnel in the Canton of Zug and the Canton of Zurich, Switzerland which opened in 1897. It crosses the Albis and connects Sihlbrugg railway station to Litti near Baar. At a length of 3,360 metres (11,020 ft), it was the second longest railway tunnel of Switzerland at the time of its opening. As it is only single-track, it has been described as a bottleneck of railway traffic.

== History ==
=== Planning ===
In the context of the construction of the Gotthard railway and the Lake Zurich left-bank railway line by the Swiss Northeastern Railway (NOB) in the 1870s, there was a desire to connect the two lines with a branch running from Thalwil to Zug, which would later become the Thalwil–Arth-Goldau railway line. Originally the line was planned to only cross the Zimmerberg range through the Zimmerberg Tunnel and then follow the Sihl valley in the open to Walterswil near Baar, leading to Zug. However, due to the NOB railway crisis, construction of NOB lines were put on hold. Only in 1890, after the Federal Assembly had made the definite decision to construct a line Thalwil–Baar–Zug, the NOB returned to planning the connecting branch, and selected a tunnel through the Albis as the better option against the proposed open line through Walterswil. Since both the Sihltal railway line and a proposed (but later failed) line coming from St. Gallen were planning to connect to Zug through the same tunnel, there were demands to build the Albis tunnel as double-track, which was opposed by the NOB and ultimately rejected by the Federal Council in favour of a certain and timely execution.

=== Construction ===
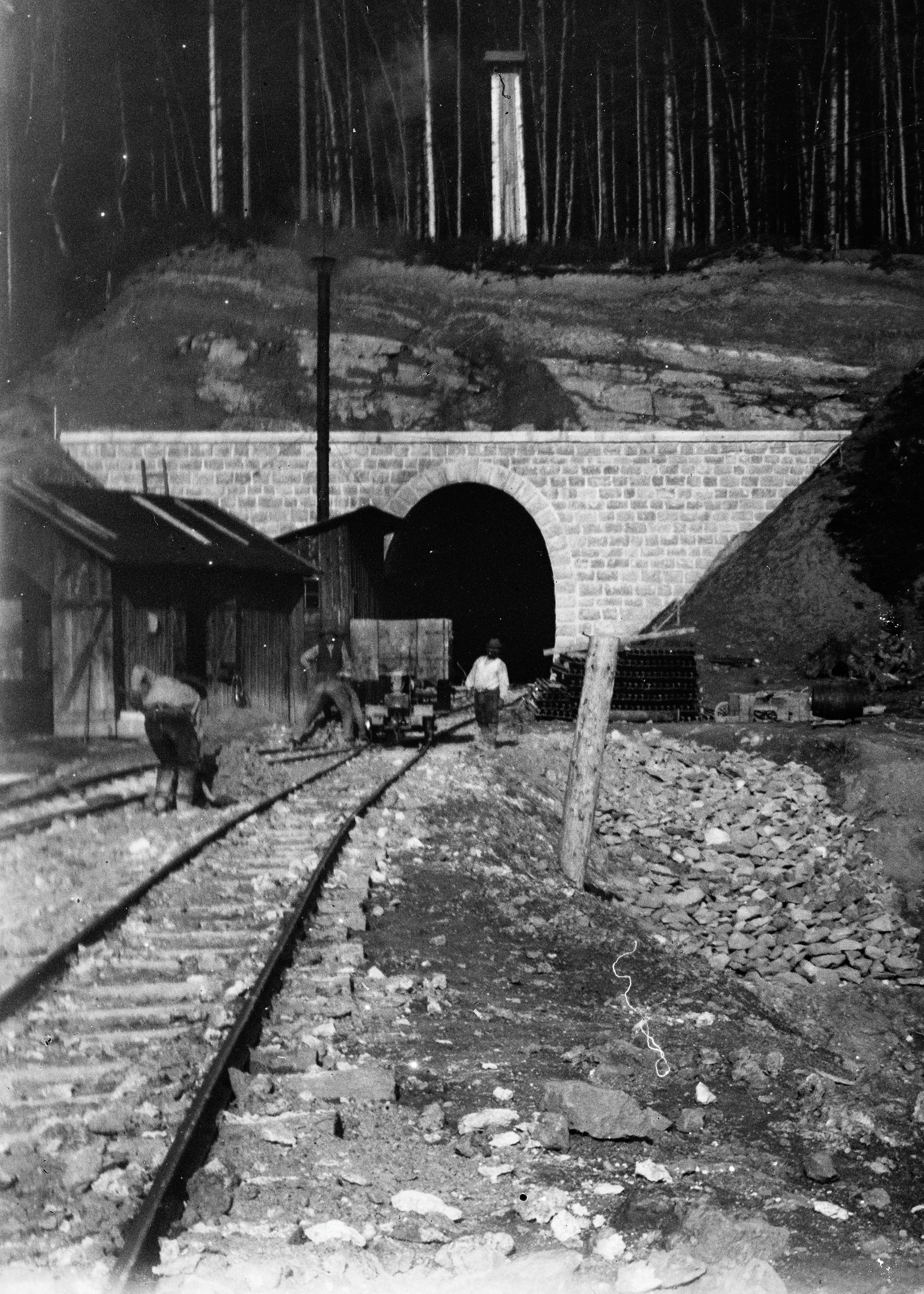
Construction at the southern portal (1893)

From December 1891 to February 1892, the NOB began the construction of the tunnel under piecework, and around the same time, published the second invitation to tender for an "Albis Tunnel of 3400 m of length" with a proposed tender of roughly 3.5 million Swiss Franc. In early 1892, the contract was given to the company Franz Lusser & Cie., which resumed work on the tunnel in April of the same year. Engineer Franz Vital Lusser had founded this company and amassed enough money for the security deposit required by the contract, which he had failed to procure when the NOB published the first invitation to tender in 1891. As an engineer, he had already been involved with the construction of the Gotthard Tunnel under Louis Favre.

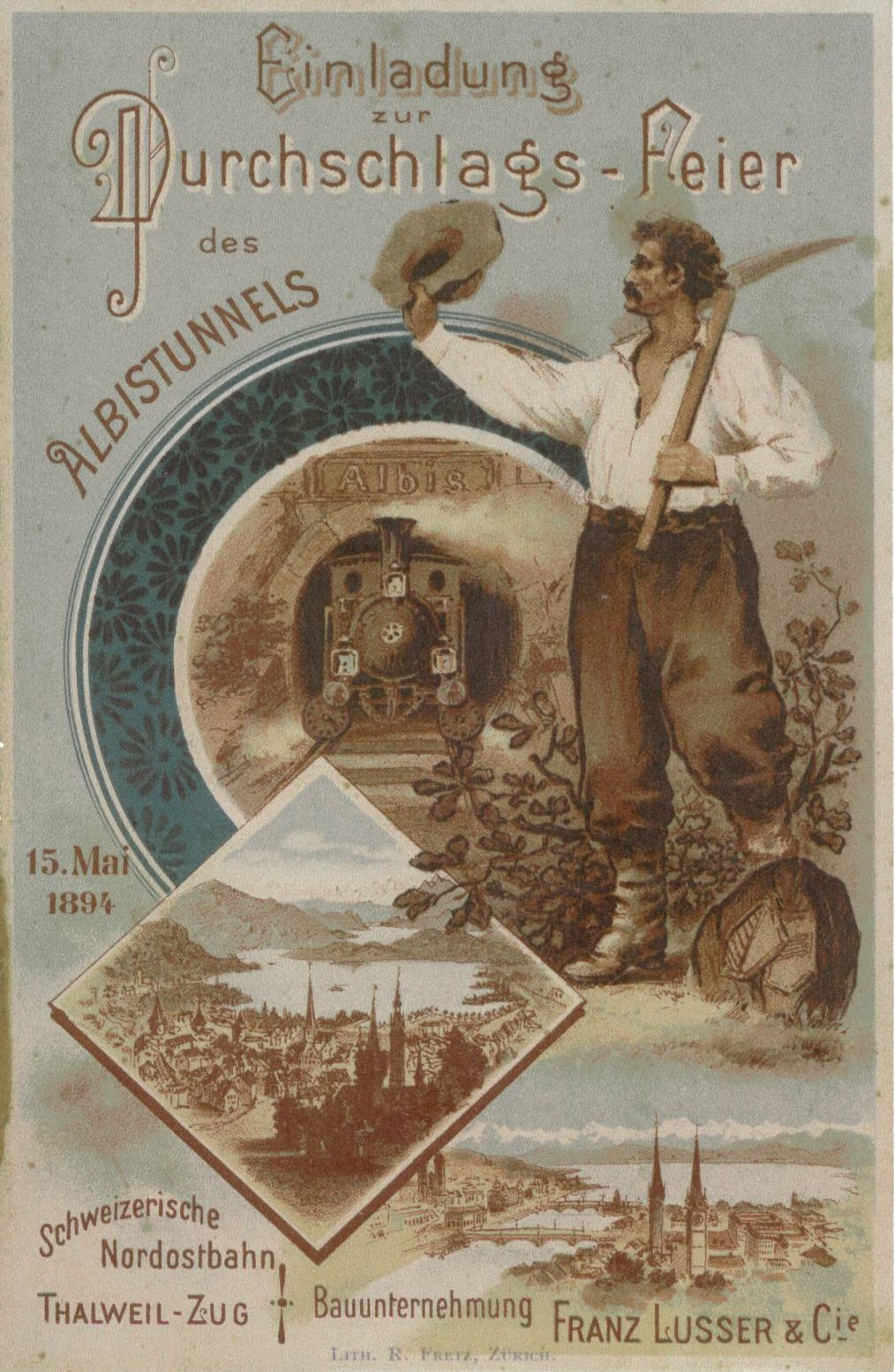
Invitation card to the breakthrough ceremony of the Albis Tunnel on 15 May 1894

Under him, the construction of the tunnel, executed from both ends, was able to progress at an average rate of 3 metres per day. Breakthrough of the pilot tunnel was achieved on 8 May 1894 with an "official breakthrough" celebrated on 15 May 1894. At convergence of the two sections built from either site, there was a deviation of 4–5 centimetres. Construction of the walling was finished in August of the same year. Overall, the construction of the Albis Tunnel finished one year earlier than planned, despite it originally being estimated to be the most time-consuming part of the Thalwil-Zug line.

The tunnel opened to traffic along with the rest of the Thalwil–Zug line on 1 June 1897 and at that time, at a length of 3,360 m (11,020 ft), it was the second longest tunnel of Switzerland.

== Operations ==
The Albis Tunnel constitutes a single-track section on the Thalwil-Zug relation used by both local and inter-regional trains. It has been described as a bottleneck of Swiss railway traffic as it prevents an expansion of traffic capacity. This impacts routes leading into Central Switzerland, such as routes to Lucerne, as well as routes to Ticino in southern Switzerland. Although proposals for the construction of a second tunnel parallel to the Albis Tunnels had been made, they were dropped in favour of the planned Phase 2 of the Zimmerberg Base Tunnel (ZBT2), part of the Swiss railroad project STEP 2035, which would connect to the existing Phase 1 (ZBT1) in Thalwil and lead directly to Baar.
