= Oberrieden railway station =

Railway station in Switzerland

Oberrieden
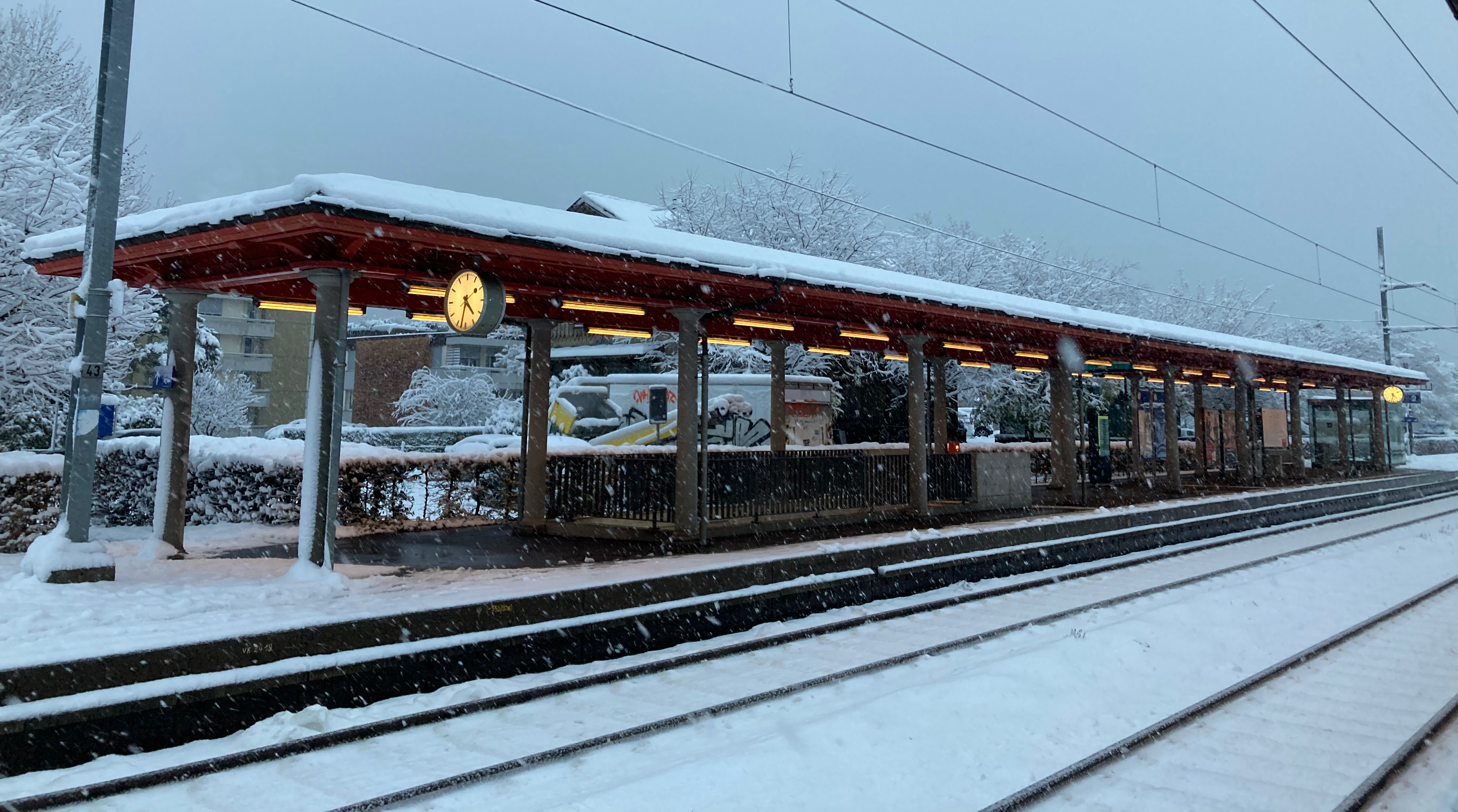
- The northbound platform in the winter

General information
- Location: Oberrieden; Switzerland
- Coordinates: 47°16′47″N 8°34′42″E
- Elevation: 424 m (1,391 ft)
- Owner: Swiss Federal Railways
- Line: Lake Zurich left-bank line
- Platforms: 2 side platforms
- Tracks: 2
- Train operators: Swiss Federal Railways
- Connections: ZVV
- Ship: ZSG passenger ships
- Bus: Zimmerbergbus bus route 146

Other information
- Fare zone: 150 (ZVV)

Services
Preceding station	Zurich S-Bahn	Following station
Thalwil towards Winterthur	S8	Horgen towards Pfäffikon SZ
Thalwil towards Pfäffikon ZH	SN8 Limited service	Horgen towards Lachen
Location
- Location within Switzerland Location within Canton of Zürich

Oberrieden railway station is a railway station in Switzerland, on the banks of Lake Zurich in the town of Oberrieden. The station is on the Lake Zurich left bank railway line, within fare zone 150 of the Zürcher Verkehrsverbund.(ZVV)

Oberrieden station should not be confused with the nearby, but higher level, Oberrieden Dorf railway station, which is on the Thalwil–Arth-Goldau railway. The two stations are approximately 400 metres (1,300 ft) apart on foot.

== Layout ==
The station has two side platforms for the two tracks passing through. The principal station building is to the west of the tracks, whilst on the opposite side of the tracks is the goods shed, dating from 1874 and a class B regional property in the Swiss Inventory of Cultural Property of National and Regional Significance.

== Services ==
Oberrieden railway station is served by line S8 of the Zurich S-Bahn, which operates between Winterthur and Pfäffikon, via Zurich. As of the December 2023 timetable change, the following services call at Oberrieden:

- Zurich S-Bahn S8: half-hourly service between Pfäffikon SZ and Winterthur, via Zürich HB

During weekends (Friday and Saturday nights), there is also a nighttime S-Bahn service (SN8) offered by ZVV.

- Nighttime S-Bahn (only during weekends):
  - SN8: hourly service between Pfäffikon ZH and Lachen (via Zürich HB)

In addition, the station is served by buses of Zimmerbergbus, which operate from a bus station next to the railway station. The Zürichsee-Schifffahrtsgesellschaft (ZSG) call at a pier on the lakeside a short distance southeast to the railway station. The ships run either in direction to Zurich Bürkliplatz or Rapperswil/Schmerikon, serving the terminals of several lakeside towns and Ufenau island en route.

== See also ==
- Rail transport in Switzerland
