= Oberrieden Dorf railway station =

Railway station in Switzerland

Oberrieden Dorf
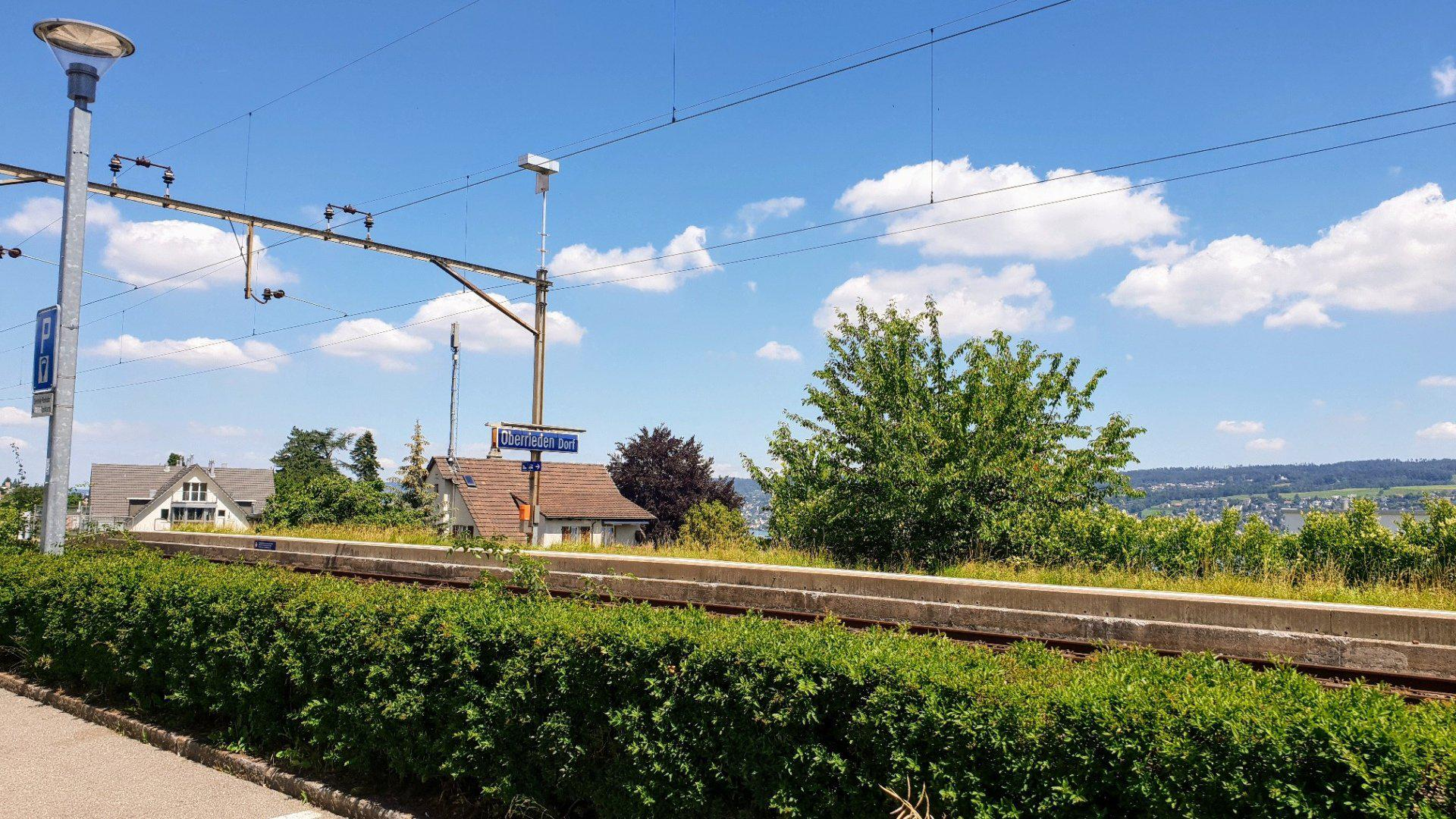
- The station platform in 2018

General information
- Location: Oberrieden, Canton of Zurich; Switzerland
- Coordinates: 47°16′36″N 8°34′40″E
- Elevation: 460 m (1,510 ft)
- Owner: Swiss Federal Railways
- Line: Thalwil–Arth-Goldau line
- Distance: 14.5 km (9.0 mi) from Zürich HB
- Platforms: 2 side platforms
- Tracks: 2
- Train operators: Swiss Federal Railways
- Connections: Zimmerbergbus bus route 145

Other information
- Fare zone: 150 (ZVV)

Passengers
- 2018: 1,800 per weekday

Services
Preceding station	Zurich S-Bahn	Following station
Horgen Oberdorf towards Zug	S24	Thalwil towards Thayngen or Weinfelden
Location
- Location within Switzerland Location within Canton of Zürich

Oberrieden Dorf railway station (German: Bahnhof Oberrieden Dorf is a railway station in Switzerland, in the upper part of the town of Oberrieden. The station is located on the Thalwil–Arth-Goldau railway, within fare zone 150 of the Zürcher Verkehrsverbund (ZVV).

Oberrieden Dorf station should not be confused with the nearby, but lower level, Oberrieden railway station, which is on the Lake Zurich left bank railway line. The two stations are approximately 400 metres (1,300 ft) apart on foot.

== Services ==
Oberrieden Dorf railway station is served by the S24 line of the Zurich S-Bahn, which runs between Zug and Thayngen/Weinfelden, via Zurich and Winterthur. As of the December 2020 timetable change, the following services stop at Oberrieden Dorf:

- Zurich S-Bahn S24: half-hourly service between Zug and Winterthur; trains continue from Winterthur to either Thayngen or Weinfelden.

== See also ==
- Rail transport in Switzerland
