= Au railway station =

Au railway station, or Au station, may refer to:

- Au SG railway station, in the Swiss canton of St. Gallen
- Au ZH railway station, in the Swiss canton of Zürich
- Au (Sieg) railway station, in the German state of North Rhine-Westphalia
