= Jacob Wipf =

American politician (1834–1910)

Jacob Wipf (1834 – 1910) was a member of the Wisconsin State Assembly.

== Biography ==
Wipf was born on December 15, 1834, in Horgen, Switzerland. During the American Civil War, he served with the 44th Wisconsin Volunteer Infantry Regiment of the Union Army, achieving the rank of sergeant. Events he took part in include the Battle of Nashville.

== Political career ==
Wipf was a member of the Assembly during the 1889 and 1893 sessions. Additionally, he chaired the town board (similar to a city council) and was Town Treasurer of Iola, Wisconsin. He was a Republican. He died on 14 October 1910 in Iola.
