= Au ZH railway station =

Railway station in the canton of Zürich, Switzerland

Au ZH
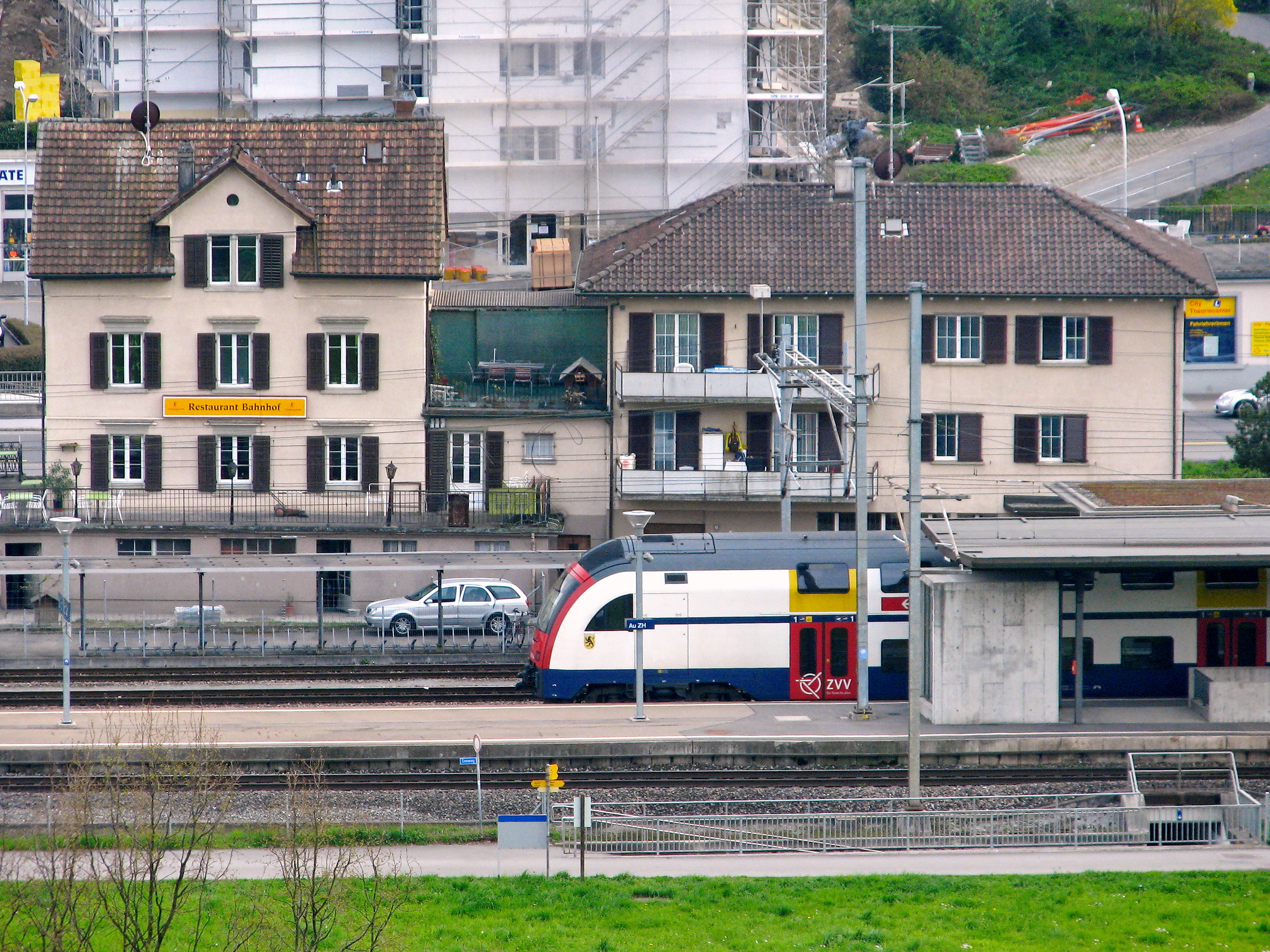
- The station in 2010

General information
- Location: Wädenswil; Switzerland
- Coordinates: 47°14′49″N 8°38′37″E
- Elevation: 410 m (1,350 ft)
- Owner: Swiss Federal Railways
- Line: Lake Zurich left-bank line
- Platforms: 1 island platform
- Tracks: 4
- Train operators: Swiss Federal Railways
- Connections: Zimmerbergbus bus routes

Other information
- Fare zone: 152 (ZVV)

History
- Opened: 1875
- Former names: Au (ZH), Au (Zürich)

Services
Preceding station	Zurich S-Bahn	Following station
Horgen towards Winterthur	S8	Wädenswil towards Pfäffikon SZ
Horgen towards Pfäffikon ZH	SN8 Limited service	Wädenswil towards Lachen
Location
- Location within Switzerland Location within Canton of Zürich

Au ZH railway station (German: Bahnhof Au ZH) is a railway station in Switzerland, situated in the village of Au in the municipality of Wädenswil in the canton of Zurich (abbreviated to ZH), near the Au Peninsula. The station is located on the Lake Zurich left bank railway line, within fare zone 152 of the Zürcher Verkehrsverbund (ZVV).

As conventions change, the station's name "Au ZH" was previously written "Au (ZH)" or "Au (Zürich)".

== Services ==
Au ZH railway station is served by line S8 of the Zurich S-Bahn, which operates between Winterthur and Pfäffikon, via Zurich. Other S-Bahn services and long distance trains pass through. As of the December 2023 timetable change, the following services call at Au ZH:

- Zurich S-Bahn S8: half-hourly service between Pfäffikon SZ and Winterthur via Zürich HB

During weekends (Friday and Saturday nights), there is also a nighttime S-Bahn service (SN8) offered by ZVV.

- Nighttime S-Bahn (only during weekends):
  - SN8: hourly service between Pfäffikon ZH and Lachen (via Zürich HB)

The station is also served by bus routes of Zimmerbergbus.

== See also ==
- Rail transport in Switzerland
