= Oberrieden =

- Municipality
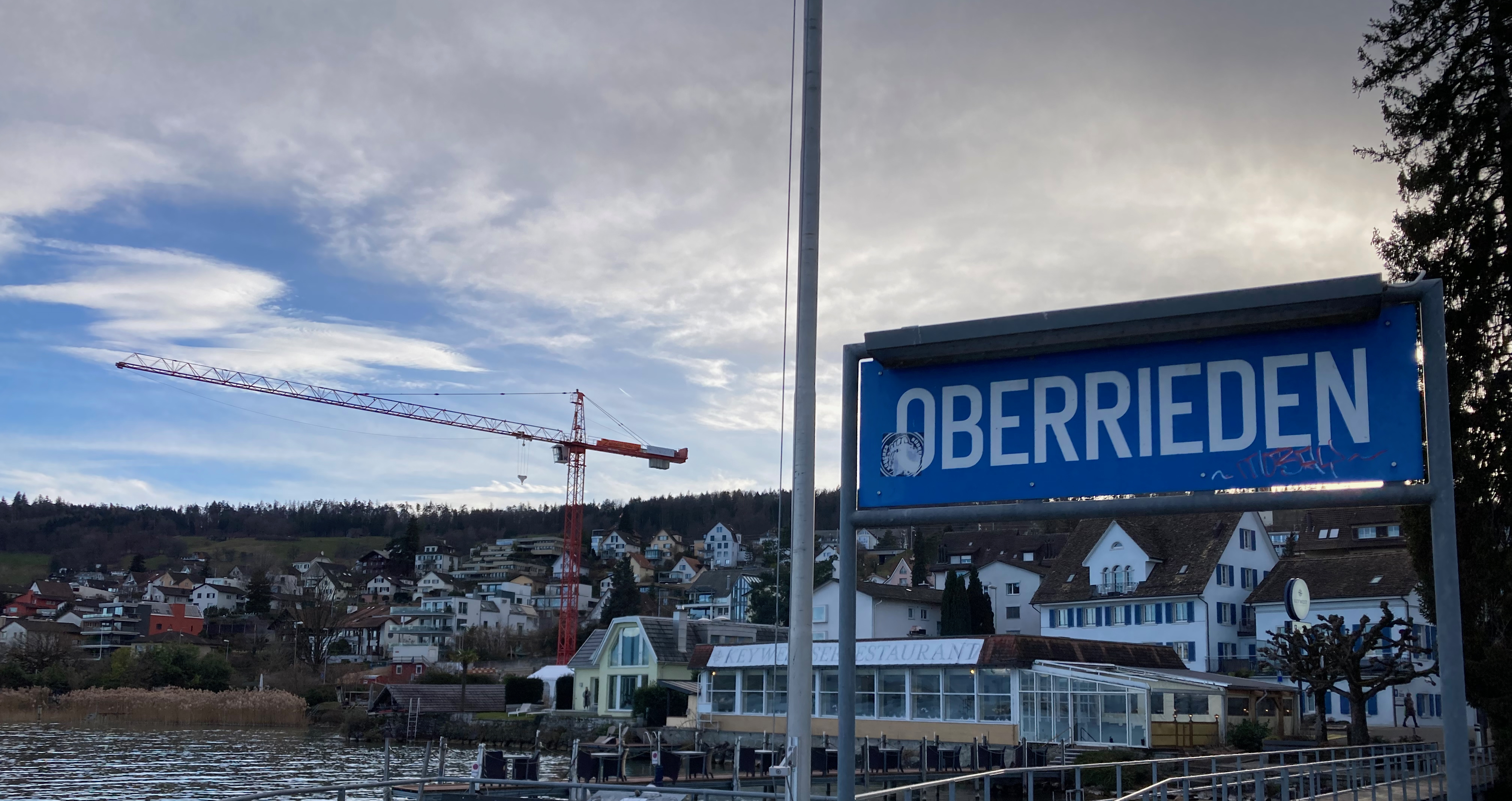
- Oberrieden seen from its ferry pier

- Flag Coat of arms
- Location of Oberrieden
- Location within Switzerland Location within Canton of Zurich
- Coordinates: 47°17′N 8°35′E
- Country: Switzerland
- Canton: Zurich
- District: Horgen

Area
  - Total: 2.76 km^{2} (1.07 sq mi)
- Elevation: 460 m (1,510 ft)

Population (Dec 2015)
  - Total: 5,027
  - Density: 1,820/km^{2} (4,720/sq mi)
- Time zone: UTC+01:00 (CET)
  - Summer (DST): UTC+02:00 (CEST)
- Postal code: 8942
- SFOS number: 137
- ISO 3166 code: CH-ZH
- Surrounded by: Herrliberg, Horgen, Meilen, Thalwil
- Website: www.oberrieden.ch

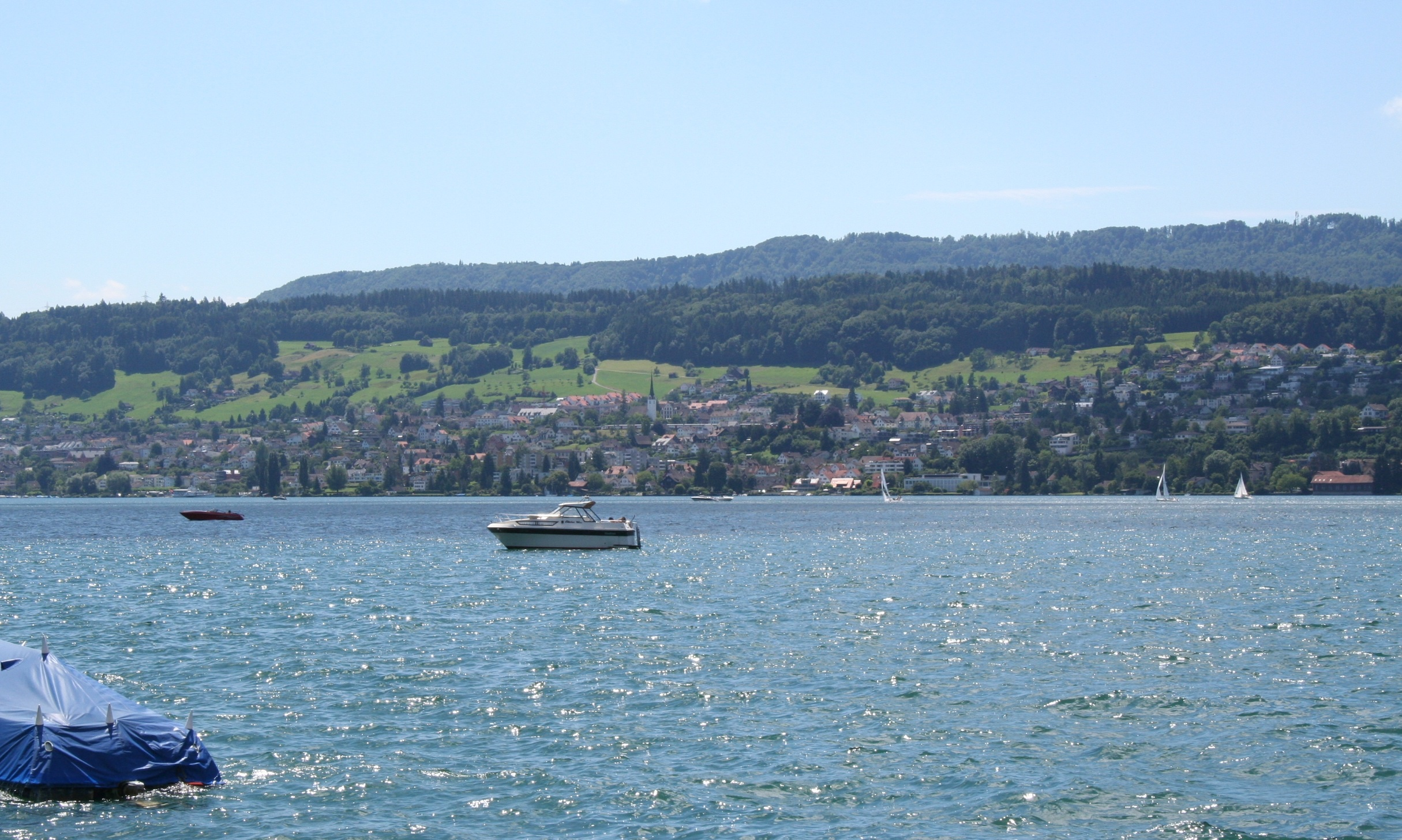
Oberrieden from across Lake Zurich

Oberrieden is a municipality in the district of Horgen in the canton of Zurich in Switzerland. It is one of the towns along the south shore of Lake Zurich.

== History ==
Oberrieden is first mentioned between 1133 and 1167 as Obrendrieden.

Aerial view (1955)

== Geography ==
Oberrieden has an area of 2.8 km^{2} (1.1 sq mi). Of this area, 15.1% is used for agricultural purposes, while 42.8% is forested. Of the rest of the land, 40.6% is settled (buildings or roads) and the remainder (1.4%) is non-productive (rivers, glaciers or mountains). In 1996 housing and buildings made up 27.2% of the total area, while transportation infrastructure made up the rest (13.8%). Of the total unproductive area, water (streams and lakes) made up 0.7% of the area. As of 2007 42.1% of the total municipal area was undergoing some type of construction.

The municipality is located on the left side of Zurich Lake. It stretches from the Sihl to Zurich Lake.

== Demographics ==
Oberrieden has a population (as of 31 December 2020) of 5,122. As of 2007, 15.4% of the population was made up of foreign nationals. As of 2008 the gender distribution of the population was 47.5% male and 52.5% female. Over the last 10 years the population has grown at a rate of 11.6%. Most of the population (as of 2000) speaks German (89.8%), with English being second most common ( 2.5%) and Italian being third ( 2.0%).

In the 2007 election the most popular party was the SVP which received 31.7% of the vote. The next three most popular parties were the FDP (20%), the SPS (16.4%) and the CSP (11.7%).

The age distribution of the population (as of 2000) is children and teenagers (0–19 years old) make up 20.1% of the population, while adults (20–64 years old) make up 62.4% and seniors (over 64 years old) make up 17.5%. In Oberrieden about 88% of the population (between age 25–64) have completed either non-mandatory upper secondary education or additional higher education (either university or a Fachhochschule). There are 2133 households in Oberrieden.

Oberrieden has an unemployment rate of 2%. As of 2005, there were 50 people employed in the primary economic sector and about 6 businesses involved in this sector. 69 people are employed in the secondary sector and there are 19 businesses in this sector. 569 people are employed in the tertiary sector, with 138 businesses in this sector. As of 2007 69.2% of the working population were employed full-time, and 30.8% were employed part-time.

As of 2008 there were 1460 Catholics and 2135 Protestants in Oberrieden. In the 2000 census, religion was broken down into several smaller categories. From the census, 50.2% were some type of Protestant, with 47.7% belonging to the Swiss Reformed Church and 2.6% belonging to other Protestant churches. 28.9% of the population were Catholic. Of the rest of the population, 0% were Muslim, 3% belonged to another religion (not listed), 3.2% did not give a religion, and 14.3% were atheist or agnostic.

The historical population is given in the following table:

year	population
1634	246
1750	690
1850	832
1900	1,224
1950	1,987
2000	4,583
2010	4,936
2020	5,118

== Transportation ==
Oberrieden is served by two railway stations on the Zurich S-Bahn that are on different lines but only some 400 metres (1,300 ft) apart. Oberrieden is on line S8, whilst Oberrieden Dorf is on line S24.

The Zimmerberg bus line (Zimmerbergbus), provided by the Sihltal Zürich Uetliberg Bahn (SZU), connects the Zimmerberg region and parts of the Sihl valley.

In the summer there are regular boats to Zurich as well as along the lake to Rapperswil, run by the Zürichsee-Schifffahrtsgesellschaft.
