= Zürichsee-Fähre Horgen–Meilen =

Ferry company in Zurich, Switzerland

Coordinates: 47.2678°N 8.6384°E

Zürichsee-Fähre Horgen-Meilen AG

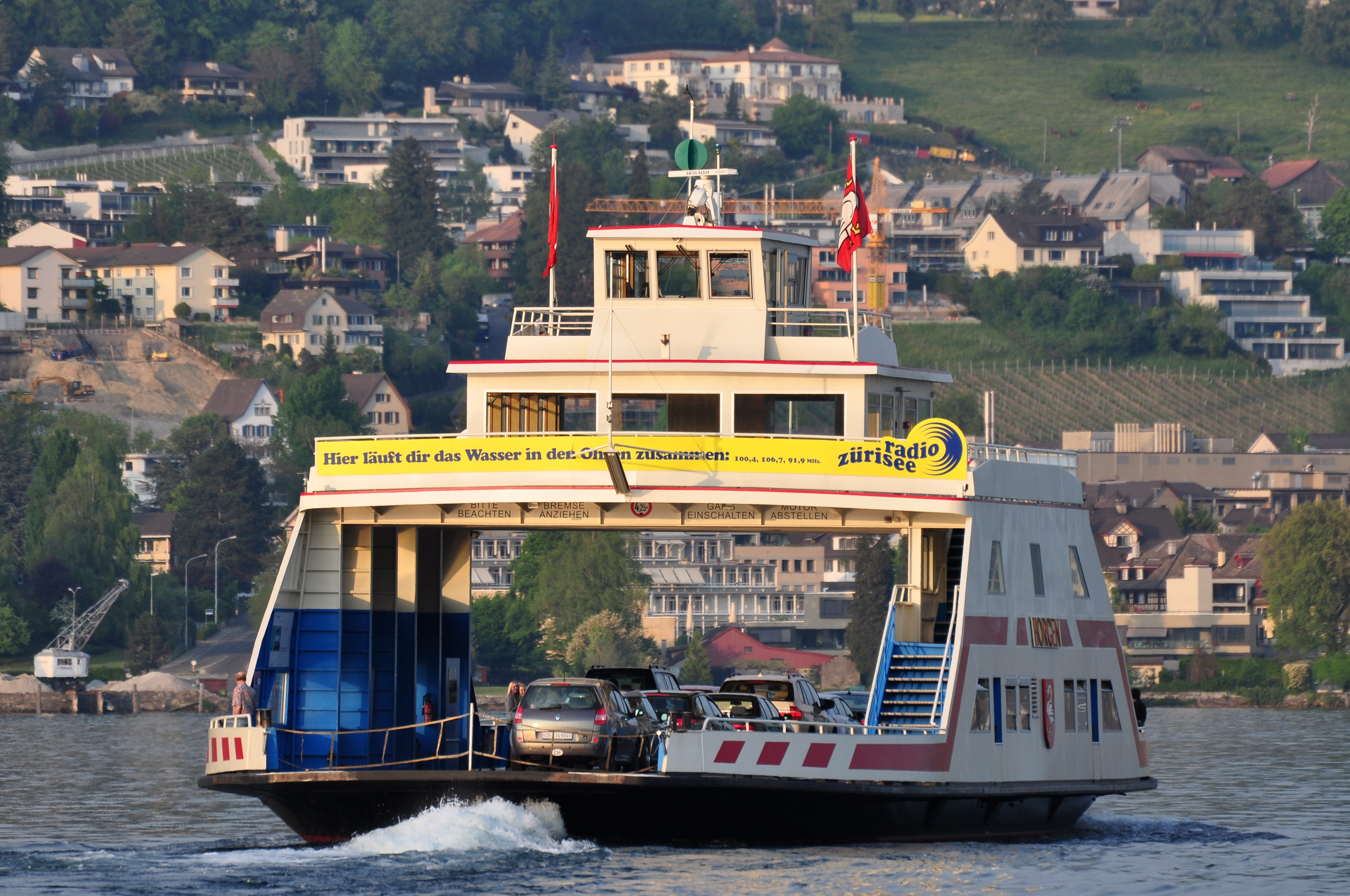
- Company type: Joint-stock company
- Industry: Transport
- Founded: 1932
- Headquarters: Meilen, Switzerland
- Area served: Lake Zurich
- Net income: 784,160.36 Swiss franc (2017)
- Total assets: 19,434,323 Swiss franc (2017)
- Website: http://www.faehre.ch/

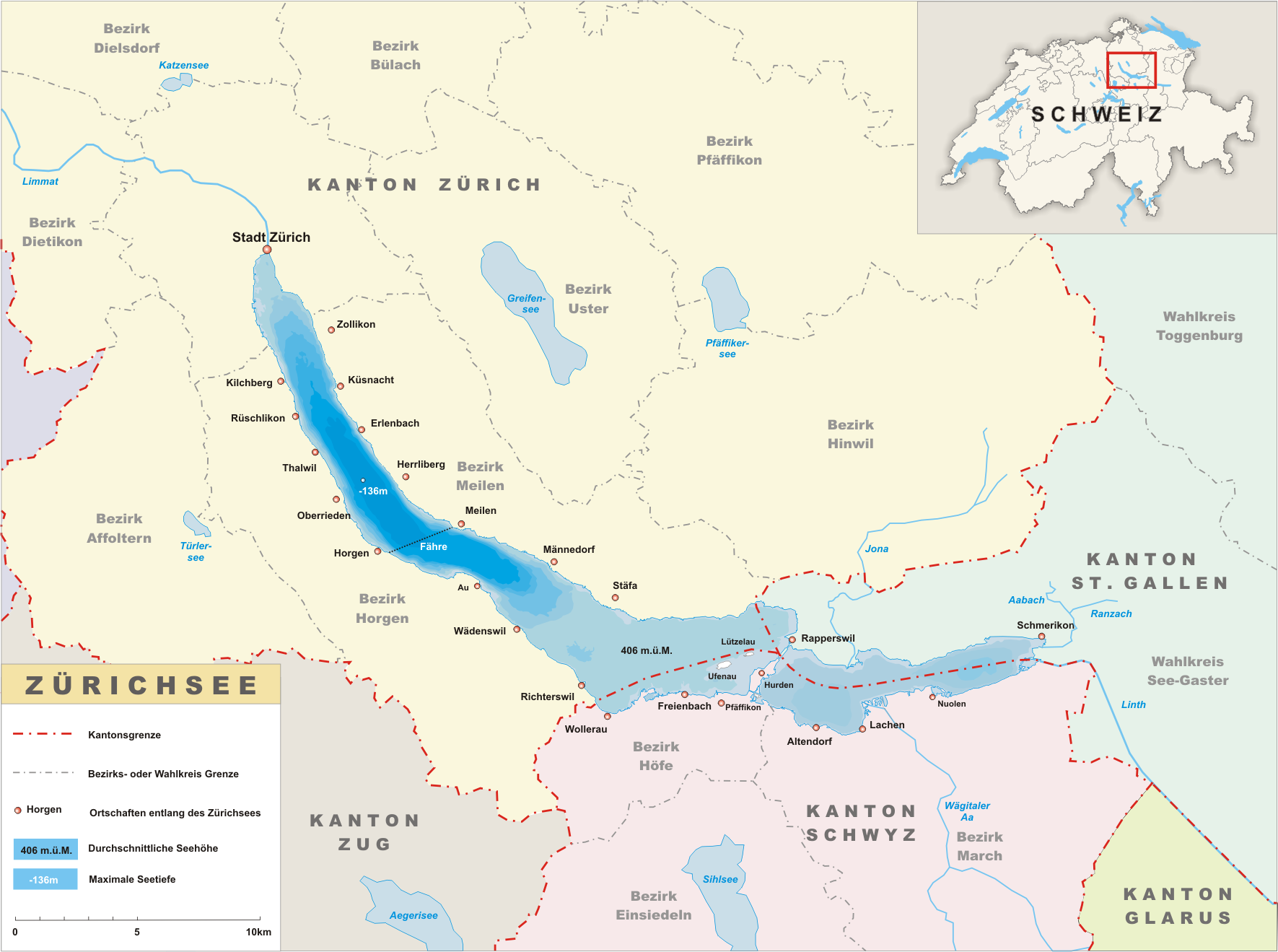
Map of Lake Zurich showing the ferry route

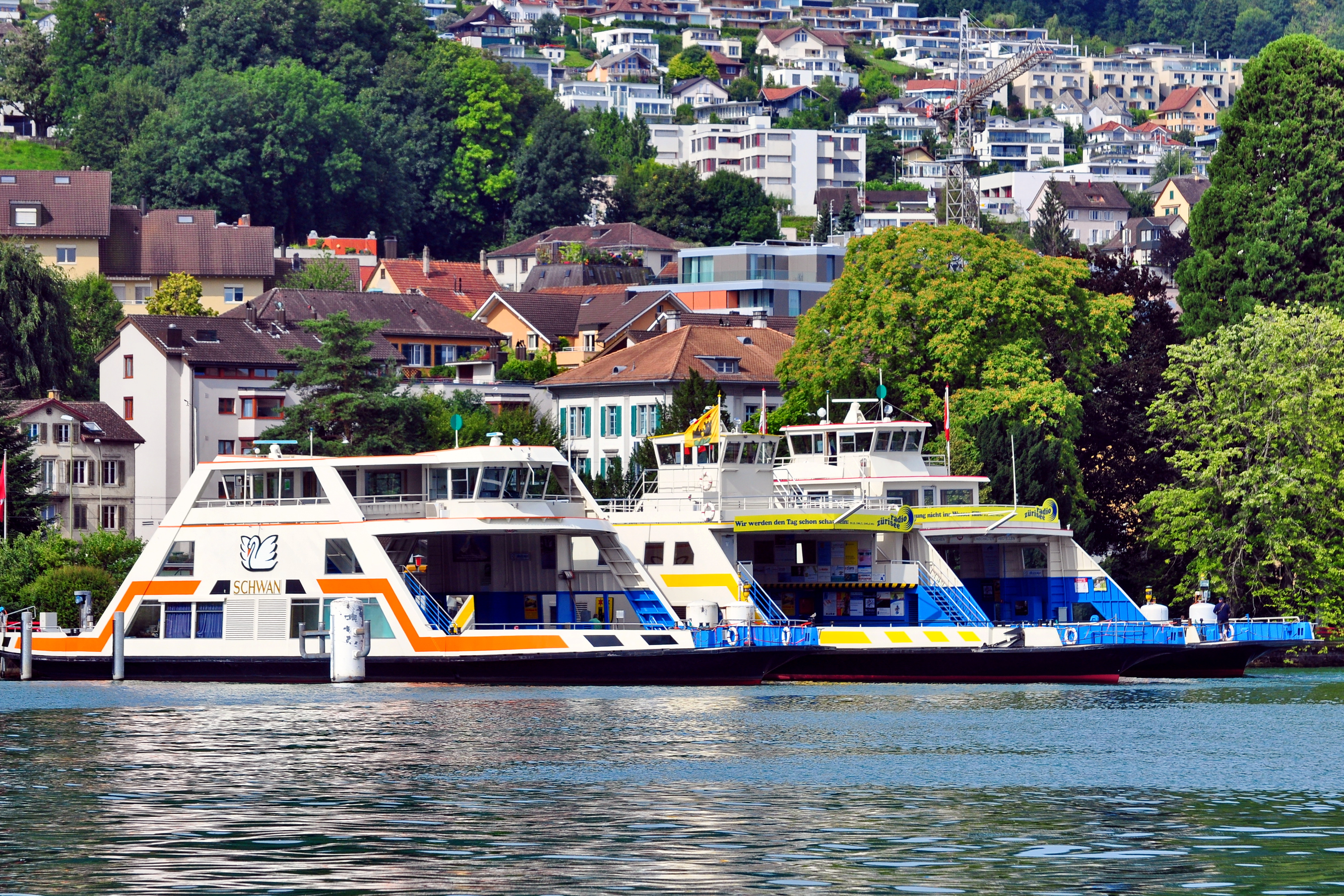
The Horgen ferry terminal, with Schwan, Meilen and Horgen alongside.

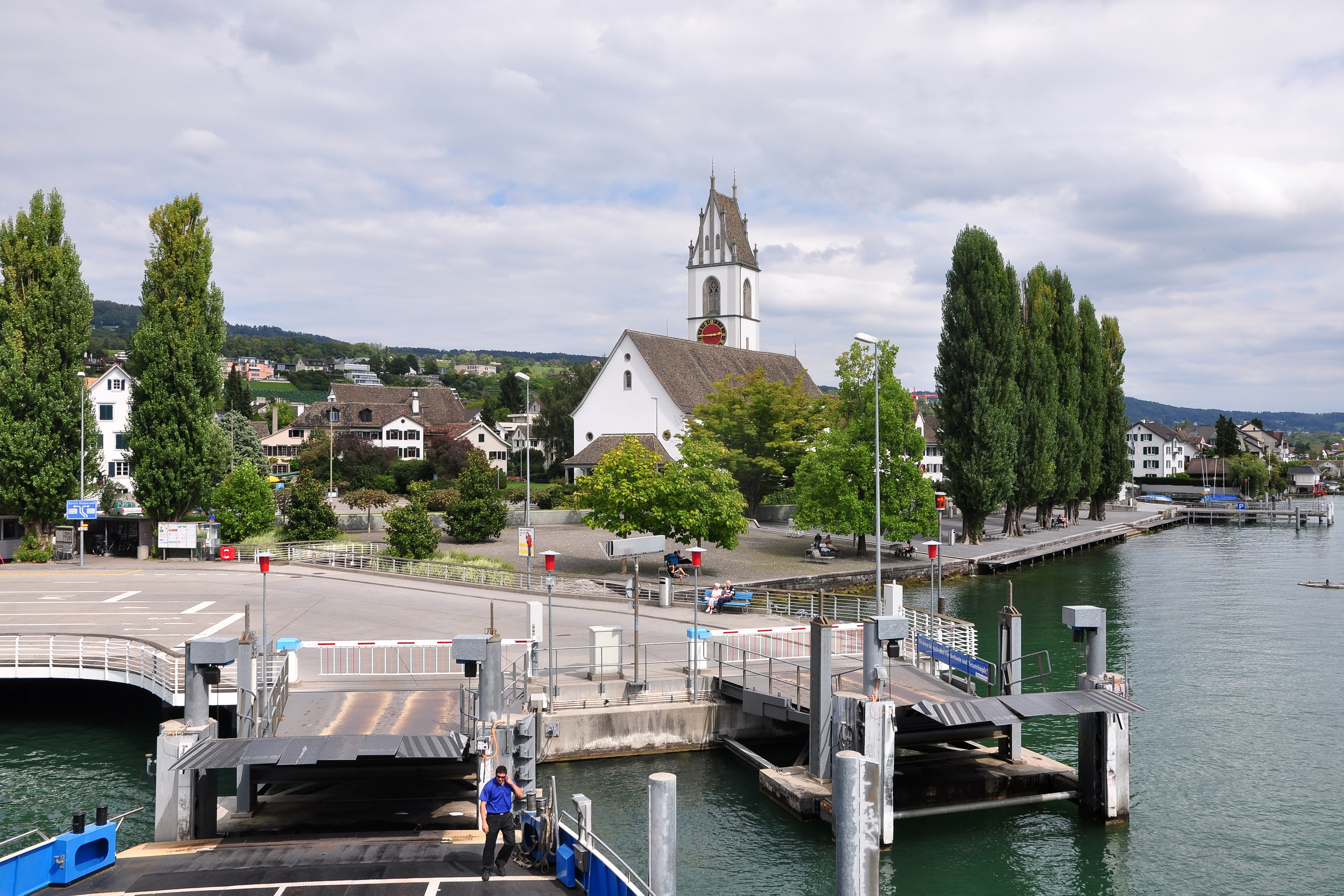
The Meilen ferry terminal, as seen from a ferry just about to depart.

The Zürichsee-Fähre Horgen–Meilen, or Horgen–Meilen car ferry, is a Swiss car ferry that operates across Lake Zurich (Zürichsee) between the lakeside towns of Horgen and Meilen. The ferry route is situated 12 kilometres (7.5 mi) south of the city of Zurich and about 17 kilometres (11 mi) northwest of Rapperswil-Jona and the Seedamm causeway. The ferry avoids a round trip by road of some 30 kilometres (19 mi) by road via Zurich and 40 kilometres (25 mi) via Rapperswil-Jona. Besides cars, the ferry also carries people and bicycles.

== History ==
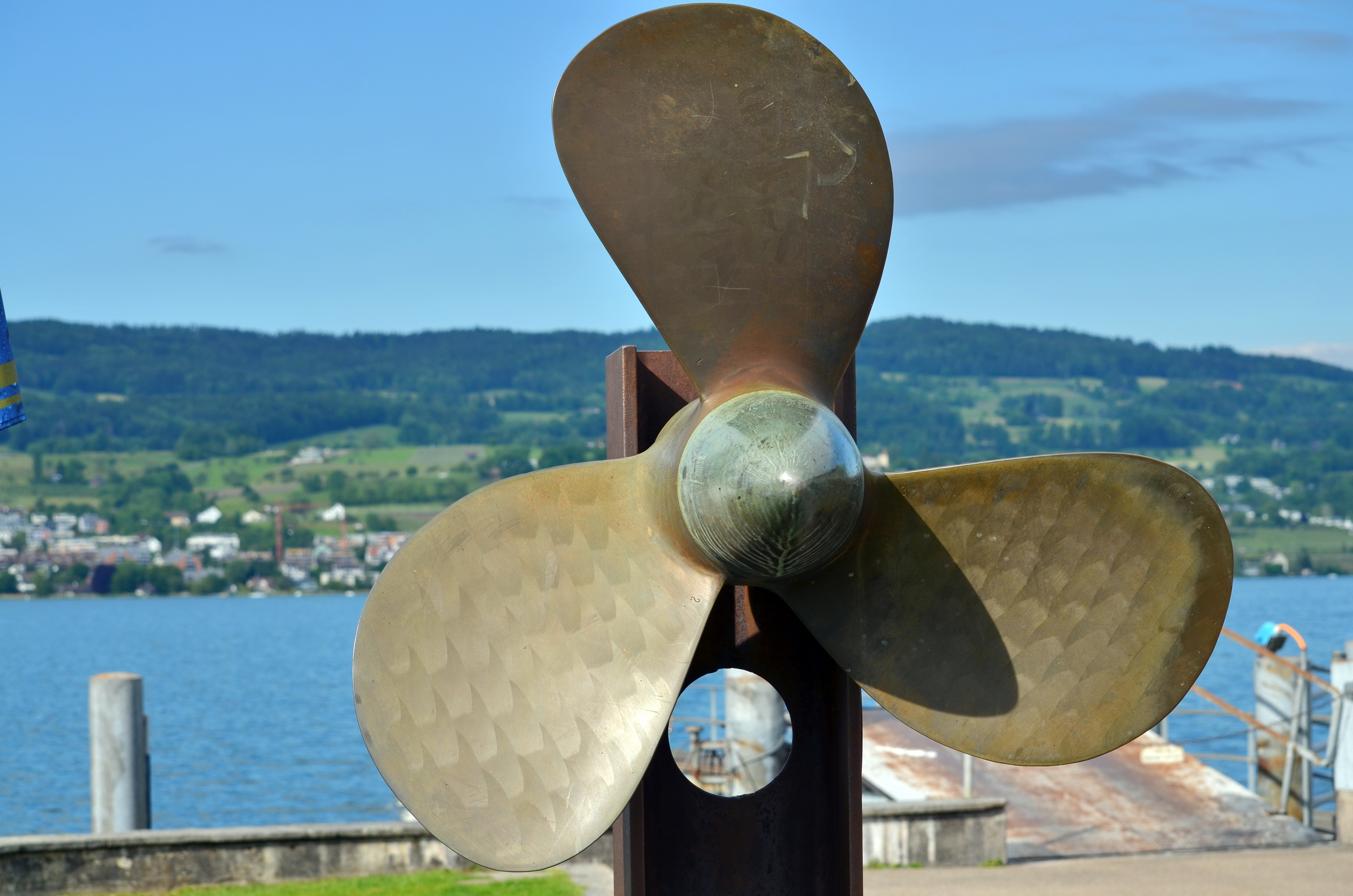
The propeller of the 1933-built Schwan, displayed at the Horgen ferry terminal.

The company was founded in 1932, with operation commencing in November 1933. Initially the service was run with the single ferry Schwan (lit. 'Swan'), built for the opening, and providing a half-hourly service. Service was suspended between 1942 and 1946, as a consequence of World War II. From 1946, the ferry was reintroduced with an hourly service.

Over time, demand rose so that a continuous shuttle operation had to be introduced. In 1968 a replacement vessel, also known as Schwan, was launched and took over the service, providing a half-hourly service. The propeller of the 1933-built Schwan is displayed at the Horgen ferry terminal. In 1973 a new approach to the Horgen ferry terminal was constructed, with a bridge over the lakeside railway line, allowing the previously used level crossing to be closed.

Over the following years, four further ferries were constructed, allowing a more frequent service to be provided. These were the Meilen (1979), the Horgen (1991), the Zürisee (1999) and the Burg (2003). Also in 1999, the second Schwan was rebuilt. In 2017 a further new ferry was built, named Meilen, in order to replace the 1979-built vessel of the same name. The earlier vessel was dismantled the following year, although its wheelhouse and Voith Schneider propeller were retained to form part of an exhibition on ferries at the Swiss Museum of Transport in Lucerne.

== Operation ==
On the Horgen side of the lake, the ferries operate from a ferry terminal with its own road-bridge across the lakeside railway line, and some 600 metres (2,000 ft) on foot along the lakeside promenade from Horgen railway station. On the Meilen side of the lake, the ferries operate from a ferry terminal on Seestrasse, a similar distance from Meilen railway station.

Ferries operate from early morning to late evening. Ferries operate every 10 minutes throughout the day, with frequencies increasing to every 6 or 7 minutes in peak periods. The crossing time is 10 minutes.

In 2011, 69,950 ferry crossings were operated, carrying in total 2,192,175 people, 1,226,540 cars, and 99,470 trucks. By 2019 these figures had changed slightly, with 68,646 crossings, 2,033,215 people carried, and 1,336,330 vehicles carried.

== Fare ==
The fare (single trip) is SFr 2.50 per person/bicycle, SFr 7.00 per motorcycle, SFr 11.00 per car, SFr 42.00 per truck/bus. ZVV tickets are valid (fare zones 141 and 151).

== Fleet ==
=== Current fleet ===
The ferry service is operated with a fleet of five motor ferries:

| Name | Length | Width | Cars | Passengers | Builder | Built | Rebuilt | Image |
|---|---|---|---|---|---|---|---|---|
| Schwan | 45.9 metres (151 ft) | 13 metres (43 ft) | 36 | 300 | Bodan-Werft GmbH | 1969 | 1999 | |
| Horgen | 49.5 metres (162 ft) | 13 metres (43 ft) | 40 | 300 | Bodan-Werft GmbH | 1991 | | |
| Zürisee | 55 metres (180 ft) | 13 metres (43 ft) | 44 | 300 | Bodan-Werft GmbH | 1999 | | |
| Burg | 55 metres (180 ft) | 13 metres (43 ft) | 44 | 300 | Bodan-Werft GmbH | 2003 | | |
| Meilen | 60 metres (200 ft) | 13.5 metres (44 ft) | 48 | 300 | ÖSWAG, Linz | 2017 | | |

=== Former fleet ===
The ferry service has previously operated two other ferries:

| Name | Length | Width | Cars | Passengers | Builder | Built | Withdrawn | Image |
|---|---|---|---|---|---|---|---|---|
| Schwan | | | | | | 1933 | 1969 | |
| Meilen | 48.5 metres (159 ft) | 12.2 metres (40 ft) | 40 | 300 | Bodan-Werft GmbH | 1979 | 2017 | |

== See also ==
- List of ferry operators
- Zürichsee-Schifffahrtsgesellschaft (ZSG), the main passenger ferry operator on Lake Zurich
- Transport in Switzerland
