= Horgen railway station =

Railway station in Switzerland

Horgen
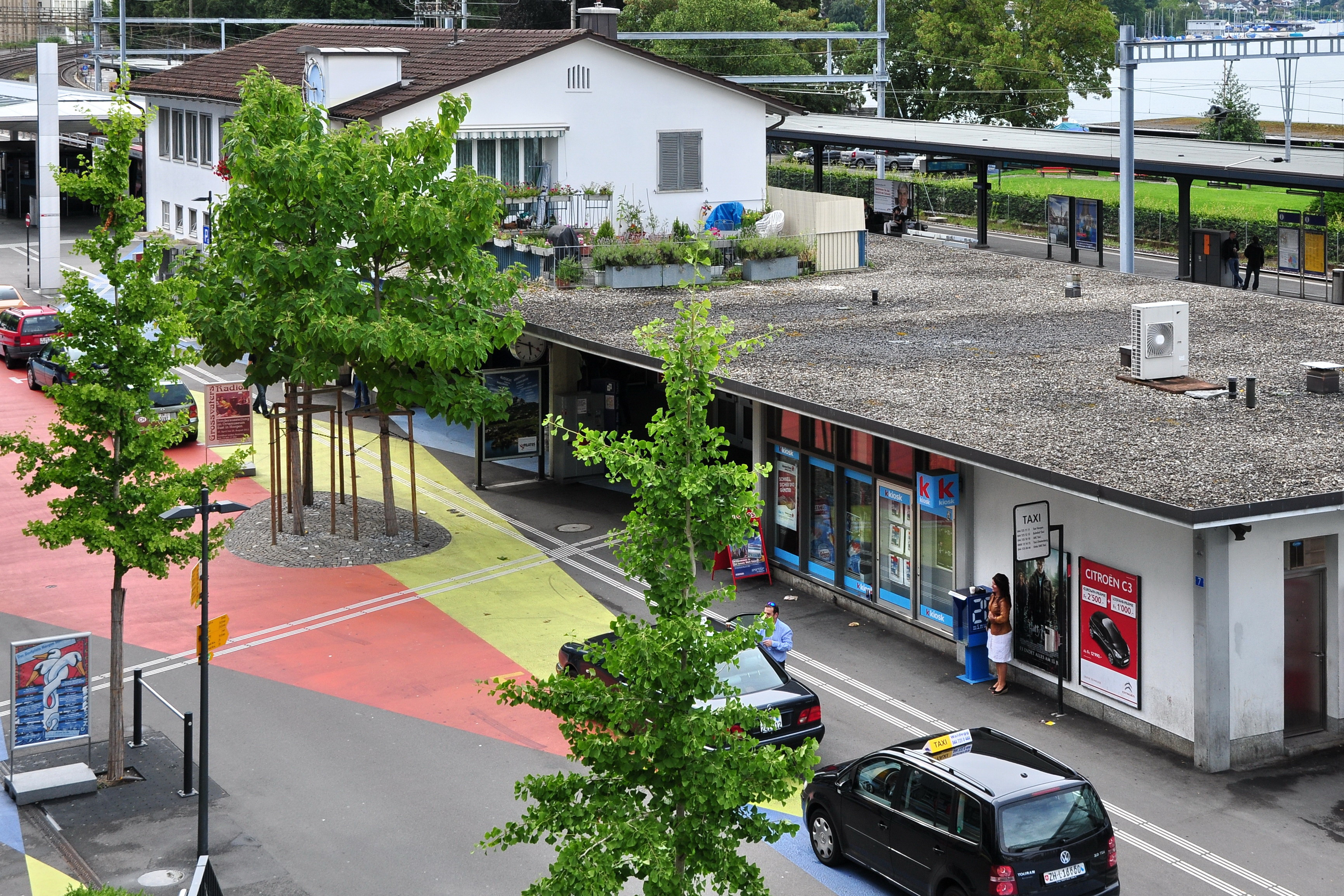
- The station in 2011

General information
- Location: Horgen; Switzerland
- Coordinates: 47°15′41″N 8°35′49″E
- Elevation: 409 m (1,342 ft)
- Owner: Swiss Federal Railways
- Line: Lake Zurich left-bank line
- Platforms: 1 island platform, 1 side platform
- Tracks: 3
- Train operators: Swiss Federal Railways
- Connections: ZVV
- Ship: ZSG passenger ships; Horgen–Meilen car ferry
- Bus: Zimmerbergbus bus routes

Other information
- Fare zone: 151 (ZVV)

Services
Preceding station	Zurich S-Bahn	Following station
Thalwil towards Zurich Airport	S2	Wädenswil towards Ziegelbrücke
Oberrieden towards Winterthur	S8	Au ZH towards Pfäffikon SZ
Oberrieden towards Pfäffikon ZH	SN8 Limited service	Au ZH towards Lachen
Location
- Location within Switzerland Location within Canton of Zürich

Horgen railway station is a railway station in Switzerland, situated on the banks of Lake Zurich in the town of Horgen. The station is located on the Lake Zurich left bank railway line, within fare zone 151 of the Zürcher Verkehrsverbund (ZVV).

Horgen station should not be confused with the nearby, but higher level, Horgen Oberdorf railway station, which is on the Thalwil–Arth-Goldau railway. The two stations are approximately 0.9 kilometres (0.56 mi) apart on foot.

== Services ==
=== Rail ===
Horgen railway station is served by two lines of the Zurich S-Bahn: the S2 service which operates between Zurich Airport and Ziegelbrücke, and the S8 service which runs between Winterthur and Pfäffikon. Both lines pass via Zurich. As of the December 2024 timetable change, the following services call at Horgen:

- Zurich S-Bahn:
  - S2: half-hourly service between Zürich Airport and Ziegelbrücke.
  - S8: half-hourly service between Pfäffikon SZ and Winterthur

During weekends (Friday and Saturday nights), there is also a nighttime S-Bahn service (SN8) offered by ZVV.

- Nighttime S-Bahn (only during weekends):
  - SN8: hourly service between Pfäffikon ZH and Lachen (via Zürich HB)

=== Bus ===
The railway station provides an integrated transfer facility with the buses of Zimmerbergbus, which operate from a bus station immediately adjacent to the railway station.

=== Boat and ferry ===
Ships of the Zürichsee-Schifffahrtsgesellschaft (ZSG) call at a pier on the lakeside immediately adjacent to the railway station. The ships run either in direction to Zurich Bürkliplatz or Rapperswil/Schmerikon, serving the terminals of several lakeside towns and Ufenau island en route. In addition, the Horgen–Meilen car ferry operates from a terminal some 600 metres (2,000 ft) to the south-east along the lakeside promenade. It links Horgen with the town of Meilen on the other side of the lake.

== Gallery ==
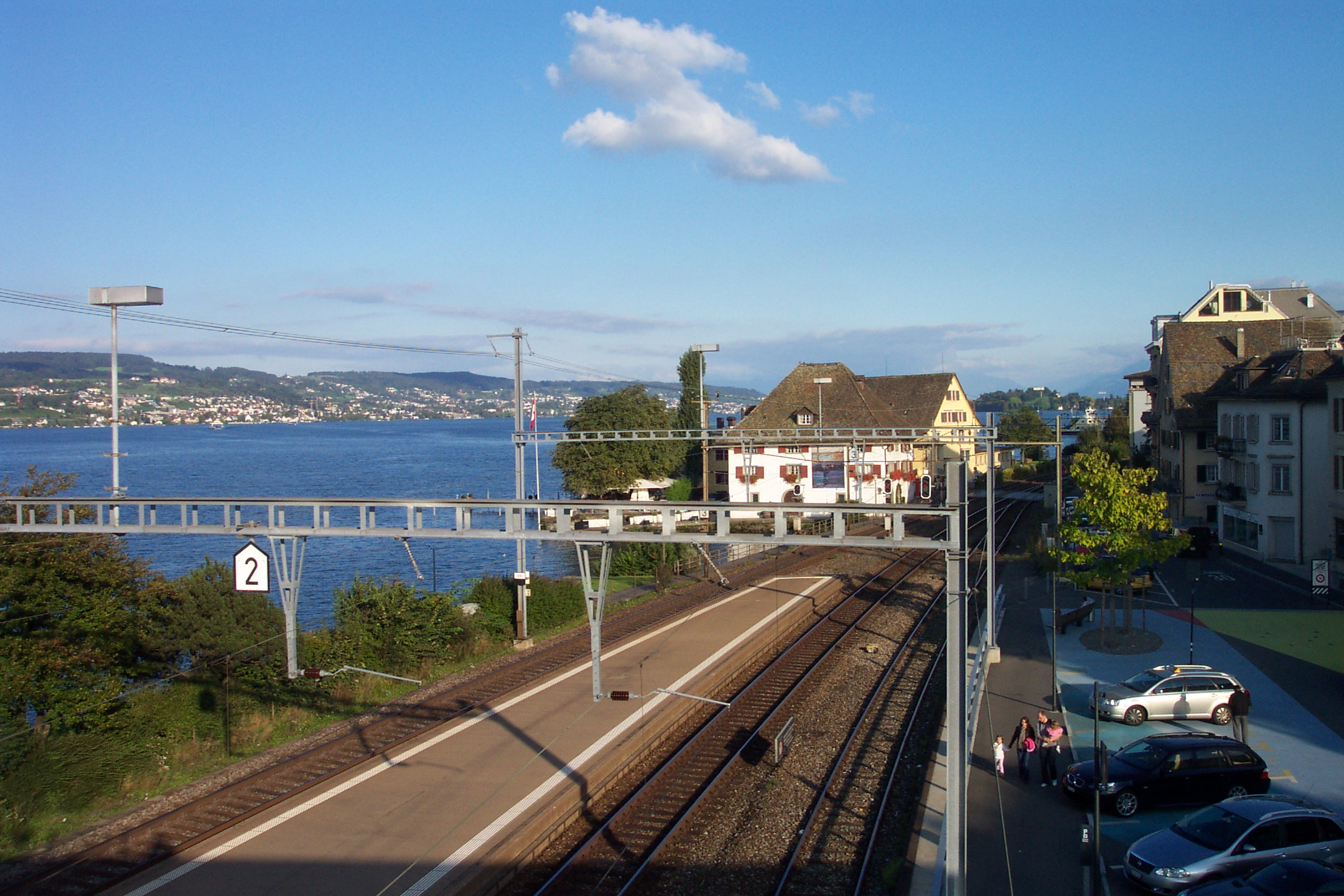
View from footbridge to south

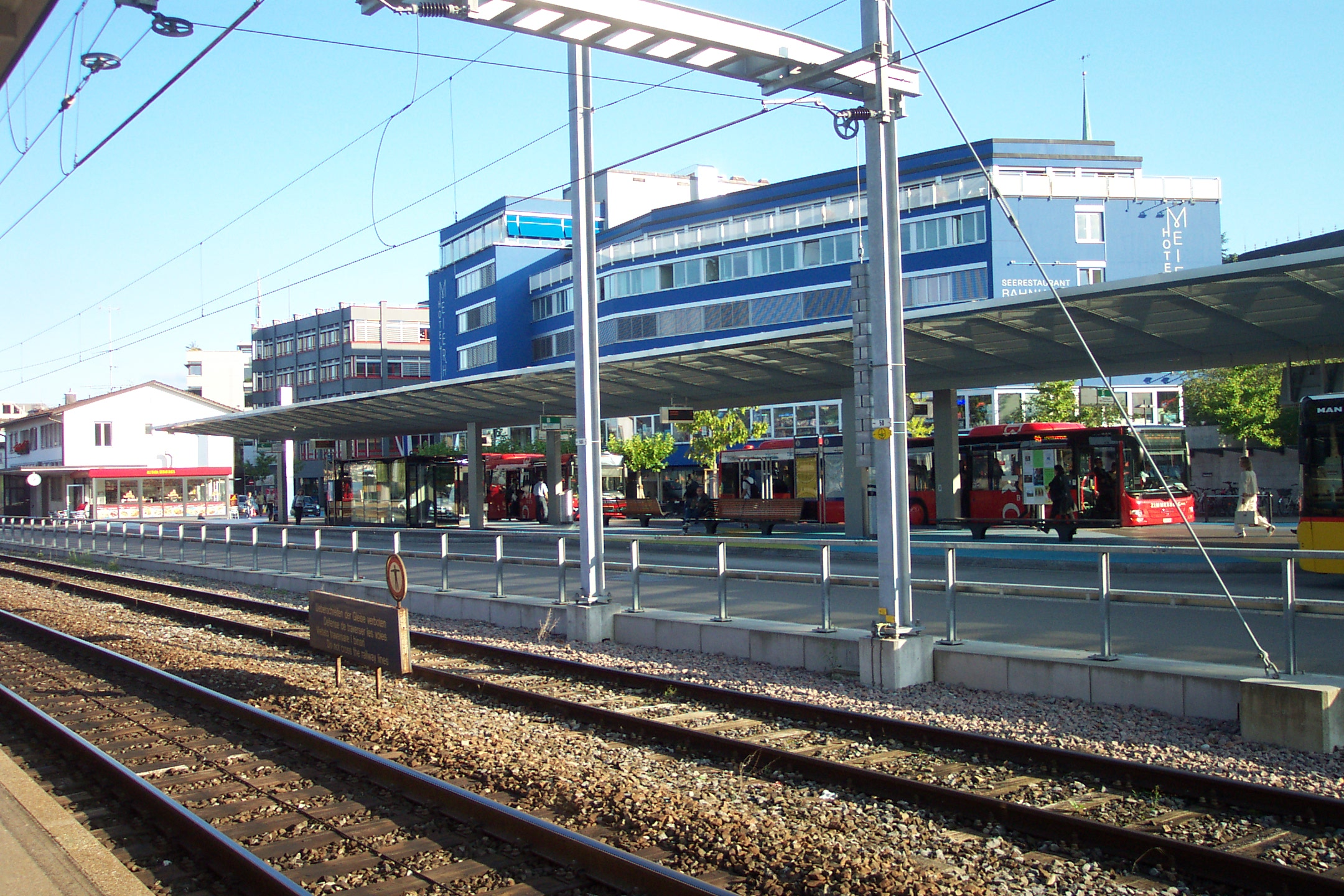
Bus station from rail platform

== See also ==
- Rail transport in Switzerland
