= Sihlbrugg railway station =

Railway Station in Horgen, Switzerland

Sihlbrugg
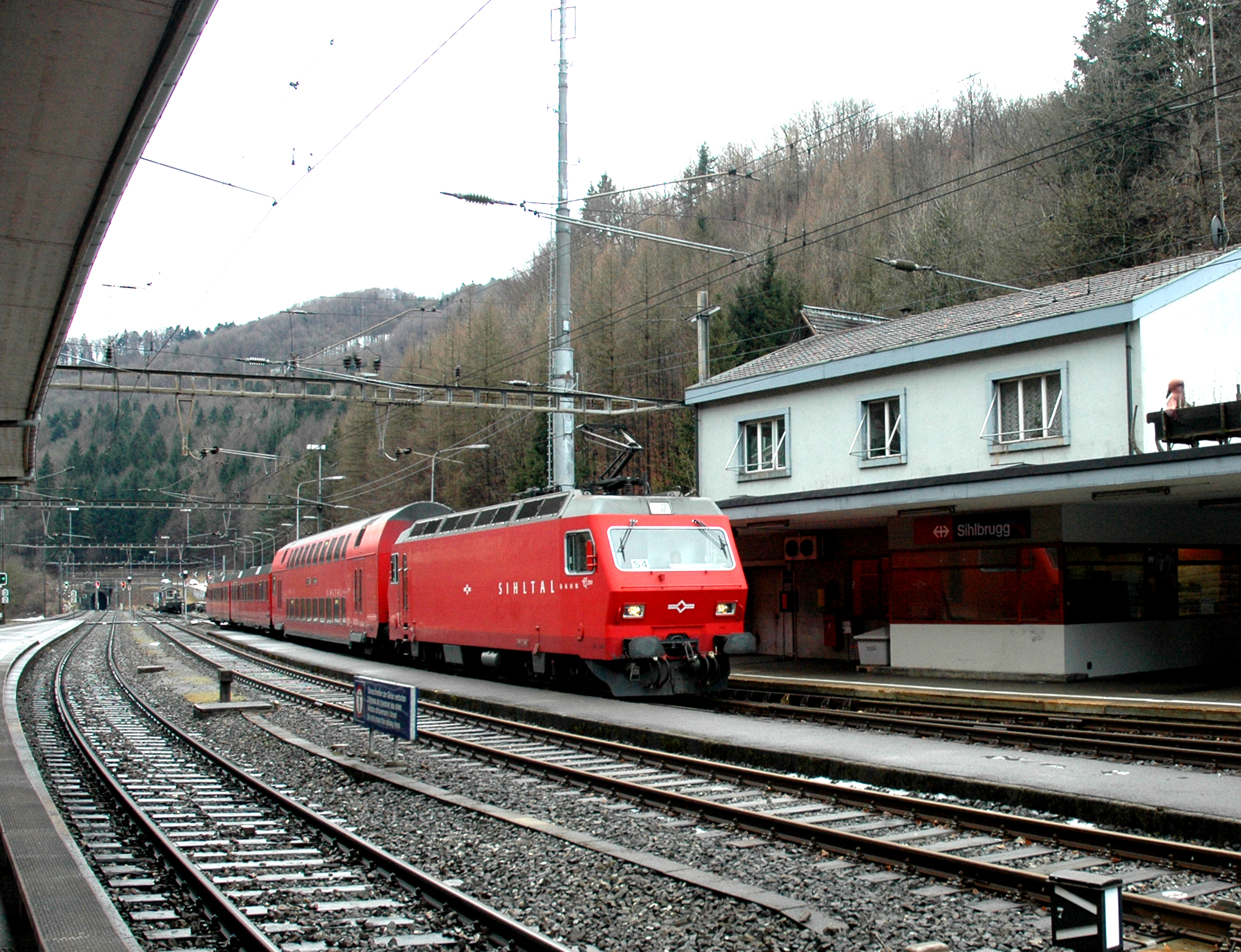
- A train of the Sihltal-Zürich-Uetliberg-Bahn (SZU) in Sihlbrugg station in 2006

General information
- Location: Sihltalstrasse; Horgen, Zürich; Switzerland
- Coordinates: 47.2385°N 8.5770°E
- Elevation: 514 m (1,686 ft)
- Operator: Swiss Federal Railways; Sihltal Zürich Uetliberg Bahn
- Lines: Thalwil–Arth-Goldau line Sihltal line
Location
- Location within Switzerland Location within Canton of Zürich

Sihlbrugg is a former railway station in the Swiss canton of Zurich. It was closed permanently in December 2012, and there are no passenger trains scheduled to stop at the station since then. Although named after the hamlet of Sihlbrugg, the station is actually located nearly 3 kilometres (1.9 mi) north of the village, in the municipality of Horgen.

The station was a junction point between the Swiss Federal Railways (SBB) Thalwil–Arth-Goldau railway, which connects Zug and Zürich Hauptbahnhof (Sihlbrugg is located between Horgen Oberdorf and Baar), and the Sihltal Zürich Uetliberg Bahn (SZU) line to Zürich via Sihlwald.

== History ==
Sihlbrugg railway station was the terminus of the Sihltal line of SZU (S4) from 1897 to 2006 (afterwards Sihlwald became the terminus).

Before December 2012, the Swiss Federal Railways (SBB) line carried both suburban and longer distance services, and the station used to be served by the former line S21 (later subsumed into line S24) of the Zurich S-Bahn.

In the summer months, the station is served occasionally by the Zürcher Museums-Bahn heritage railway.

== See also ==
- Ghost station
- Rail transport in Switzerland
