= Horgen Oberdorf railway station =

Railway station in Switzerland

Horgen Oberdorf
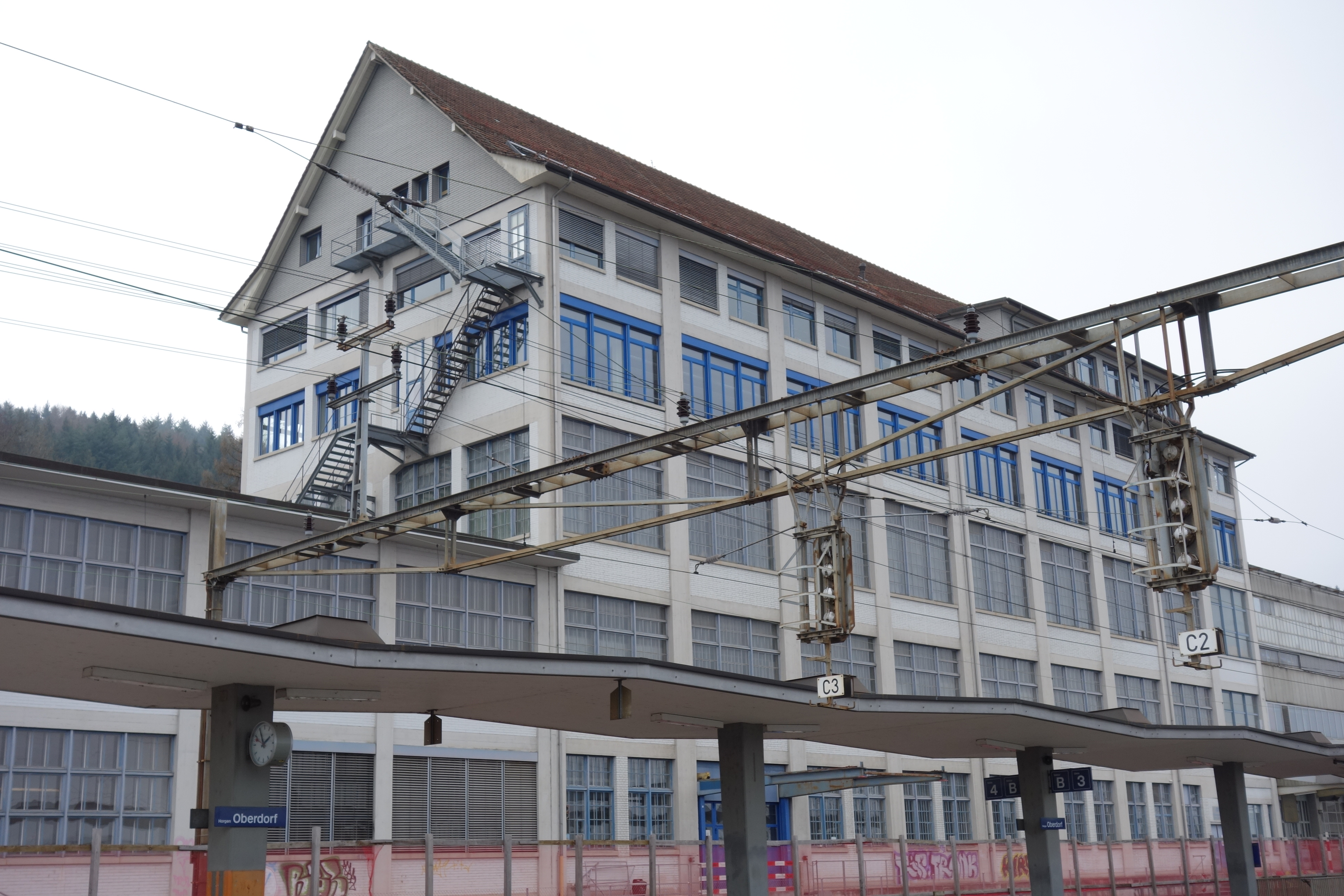
- The station platform in 2017; to the rear is the Schärer Schweiter Mettler AG building

General information
- Location: Horgen, Zürich; Switzerland
- Coordinates: 47°15′32″N 8°35′23″E
- Elevation: 483 m (1,585 ft)
- Owner: Swiss Federal Railways
- Line: Thalwil–Arth-Goldau line
- Distance: 16.8 km (10.4 mi) from Zürich HB
- Train operators: Swiss Federal Railways
- Connections: SZU bus lines

Other information
- Fare zone: 151 (ZVV)

Passengers
- 2018: 2,800 per weekday

Services
Preceding station	Zurich S-Bahn	Following station
Baar towards Zug	S24	Oberrieden Dorf towards Thayngen or Weinfelden
Location
- Location within Switzerland Location within Canton of Zürich

Horgen Oberdorf railway station (German: Horgen Oberdorf) is a railway station in Switzerland, situated in the town of Horgen. The station is located on the Thalwil–Arth-Goldau railway, within fare zone 151 of the Zürcher Verkehrsverbund (ZVV), and is served by the S24 line of the Zürich S-Bahn.

Horgen station should not be confused with the nearby, but lower level, Horgen railway station, which is on the Lake Zurich left bank railway line. The two stations are approximately 0.9 kilometres (0.56 mi) apart on foot.

== Services ==
As of the December 2020 timetable change, the following services stop at Horgen Oberdorf:

- Zurich S-Bahn S24: half-hourly service between Zug and Winterthur; trains continue from Winterthur to either Thayngen or Weinfelden.

== See also ==
- Rail transport in Switzerland
- Sihlbrugg railway station
