= Horgen =

Municipality in Zurich, Switzerland

- Municipality
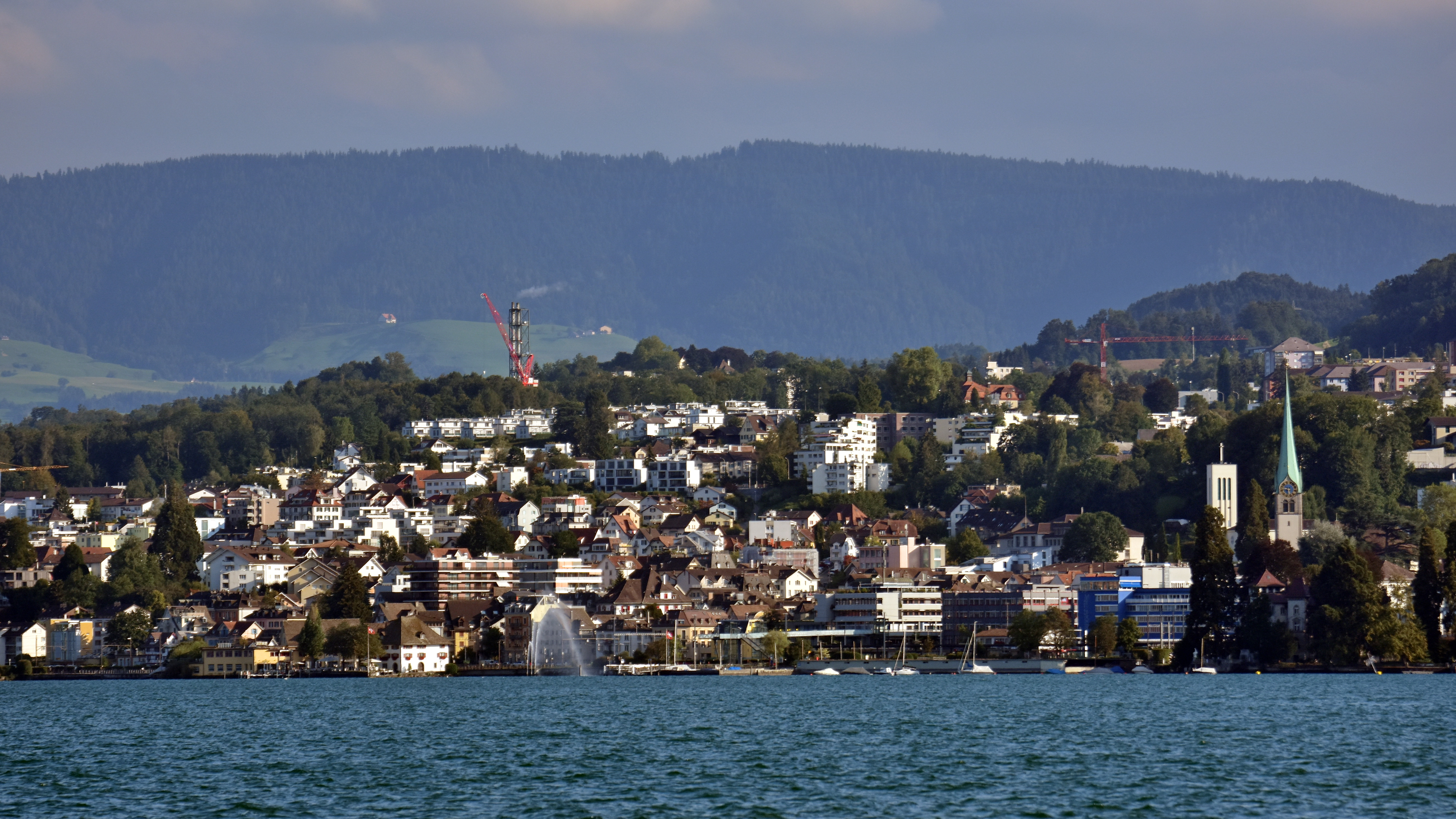

- Flag Coat of arms
- Location of Horgen
- Location within Switzerland Location within Canton of Zurich
- Coordinates: 47°15′39″N 8°35′51″E
- Country: Switzerland
- Canton: Zurich
- District: Horgen

Government
  - Mayor: Beat Nüesch FDP/PRD (as of 2022)

Area
  - Total: 30.84 km^{2} (11.91 sq mi)
- Elevation: 408 m (1,339 ft)

Population (December 2020)
  - Total: 23,090
  - Density: 748.7/km^{2} (1,939/sq mi)
- Time zone: UTC+01:00 (CET)
  - Summer (DST): UTC+02:00 (CEST)
- Postal code: 8810 Horgen 8815 Horgenberg 8816 Hirzel 8135 Sihlbrugg Station 8135 Sihlwald
- SFOS number: 295
- ISO 3166 code: CH-ZH
- Localities: Horgenberg, Sihlbrugg Station, Sihlwald, Hirzel
- Surrounded by: Wädenswil, Hausen am Albis, Langnau am Albis, Oberrieden, Thalwil
- Website: www.horgen.ch

Horgen (Swiss Standard German pronunciation: [ˈhɔrɡn̩]) is a municipality in the district of Horgen in the canton of Zürich in Switzerland.

It is one of the larger towns along the south bank of the Lake of Zurich.

On 1 January 2018 the former municipality of Hirzel merged into the municipality of Horgen.

== History ==
=== Prehistory ===
The oldest vestiges discovered to date come from the coastal station of Horgen-Dampfschiffsteg/Bootshabe. They were discovered during dredging of the channel in 1950, 1961 and 1973 (with additional surveys in 1973 and 1988). These excavations identified four levels of occupation, separated by lacustrine chalk sediments. The oldest level ends with a fire layer, while the next level contained a house dated by dendrochronology to 3713 BC. The ceramics of the oldest layer belong typologically to the middle Pfyn culture, while those of the upper layers belong to the late Pfyn period. Finds included clay crucibles for copper melting, weights, flint and stone tools (percussors, polishers, scrapers, millstones, axes), bone and antler tools, wooden objects (cups, axe handles, weaver's beaters), fragments of bark boxes, and red ochre. Dendrochronology attests to a distinct occupation phase between 2722 and 2695 BC (Corded Ware culture), from which some shards originate. A Bronze Age bronze hook and conical cup are also in the inventory.

Horgen is the type-site of the Horgen culture (a name created by Emil Vogt in 1934), specifically the station of Horgen-Scheller. First observations date from dredging for a shipyard in 1914, with further work in 1917, 1921, 1923 and 1972. Excavations took place between 1987 and 1990. The excavations distinguished four to seven levels of the Horgen culture, with lacustrine chalk sediments indicating periods of flooding. Dendrochronological analysis of the pile fields (felling in 3051–3049, 3045–3044, 3039 and 3037 BC) revealed that there were undoubtedly two neighboring settlements occupied likely in alternation. The upper layers were rich in varied remains, including ceramics, weights, stone axes, saw traces, wooden combs, a hatchet with a bent handle bound with twine, a human lower jaw, and remains of cereals and fruits.

A more recent occupation phase (piles felled between 2465 and 2459 BC) yielded Corded Ware ceramics. Isolated remains belong to the Pfyn culture and the Early Bronze Age. In 1987, a Late Bronze Age settlement (1087 to 1072 BC) was discovered about 100 m southeast of Horgen-Scheller. Two graves from the middle La Tène culture (second half of the 3rd century BC) were identified in 1840–1842 at Talacher. From the Roman period, only two coins and a tile fragment have been found. A necropolis from the Early Middle Ages was unearthed at Stockerstrasse in 1907.

=== Middle Ages ===
In the Middle Ages, a colonization movement occurred from the lake shore towards the higher sites of the Albis forest, of which the Fraumünster Abbey in Zurich was the owner by virtue of an imperial privilege of 952. A case of clearing is attested there by a deed of 1153. The late occupation explains the dispersed habitat at Horgenberg and the distribution of forest use rights between various communes and domains. The mayorie (manorial administration) of the Fraumünster (mentioned in 1369) played a role in the cultivation of the highlands. The Fraumünster also possessed mills in Horgen-Dorf (mentioned in 1263, later called Obermühle) and Käpfnach (before 1319, likely the predecessor of the Untermühle of Horgen-Dorf).

The opening of the Gotthard Pass route made Horgen an important transshipment point on the north-south axis and on the link between Lake Walen and Central Switzerland. Goods were unloaded from boats to be loaded onto pack animals and vice versa. A mule track (drivable from the 17th century) led to Zug via Hirzel and Sihlbrugg. The oldest transport regulations date from 1452; a customs post was created in 1528. Zurich built a Sust (warehouse) around 1558. In the 14th century, the locality formed one of the centers of the bailiwick of Horgen-Maschwanden with Maschwanden, then in the hands of the Habsburgs; it housed the seat after its acquisition by the city of Zurich (1406–1798).

The parish of Horgen included Hirzel until 1620 and Oberrieden until 1760. Its church appears in the mid-13th century as Fraumünster property, which sold the patronage rights to the Knights Hospitaller commandery of Klingnau in 1345. To end troubles arising from the Reformation, rights were transmitted to the Council of Zurich in 1543. The Romanesque church was enlarged during the Gothic period and in 1676, then demolished in 1780 and replaced by a Rococo style church by Johann Jakob Haltiner. Catholics have had a church since 1872 and a parish since 1874.

=== Early Modern Era ===
In the Late Middle Ages, several village communities formed; they associated to build a communal house (with an inn) in 1462. This group strengthened in the 16th century and constituted the commune of Horgen; the communities became fractions called Wachten (military districts). Jurisdictional conflicts were frequent between the commune and the fractions. The former handled the election of judges and consistory supervisors, fire police, and administration of the communal house, while the fractions dealt with field police and the use of forests and commons. The commune had a regulation drawn up in 1466 on the communal inn.

The fractions near the lake practiced crop rotation, while the temporary field method predominated in the areas of isolated farms. The example of the Reite (communal property of the Horgen-Dorf fraction) demonstrates the dynamism of pre-industrial agrarian systems: originally a sole, it was transformed into pasture in 1466. By 1545, the beneficiaries began to plough it again (division into six to ten lots called Rotten). In the 18th and 19th centuries, three years of ploughing alternated with seven years of pasture. From 1911, a system of auctioning leases was practiced. Among the commons, the Eggholz wood also appears in the 15th century. After a long quarrel, the Eggholz passed in 1923 to the political municipality.

Andreas Meyer, a Zurich silk manufacturer and future mayor, had the Bocken manor erected in 1681–1688. Craftsmanship and trade were so active that the locality obtained a market right in 1639. There was a tile factory, a lime kiln at Käpfnach (mentioned in 1400), a forge (before 1452), a dye works (1591) and tanneries. The chronicler Johannes Stumpf described the Horgen lignite deposit for the first time in 1548. Exploitation was intensified during the Franco-Prussian War and the two World Wars, then suspended in 1947 (a museum opened in 1989).

=== 19th and 20th Centuries ===
The textile home industry (putting-out system) was established primarily in the zones of isolated farms. Cotton spinning employed about 29% of the population in 1787; there were also 131 muslin looms. Factory production gradually replaced home work in the 19th century. Johann Jakob Staub founded one of the first companies using Jacquard looms in Switzerland in 1825. The silk industry, which was highly developed (ten factories in 1847, mechanical weaving from 1863), earned the locality the nickname "Little Lyon". The volume of silk exports overseas prompted the United States to open a consular agency in Horgen in 1878 (consulate from 1882 to 1898). The industry collapsed due to crises in the inter-war period.

The textile industry led to the manufacture of textile machines; an interest group ("Die 4 von Horgen"), founded in 1944, supports the marketing of this sector globally. Horgen has been the district capital since 1831. The communal parliament introduced in 1927 was abolished in 1938. The lake road (Zurich-Richterswil) and the road to Sihlbrugg were built in 1846. The opposition of Horgen boatmen to steam navigation on Lake Zurich (from 1835) delayed the development of the Haab landing stage (1839). The Aabach Hydraulic Plant Society, founded in 1883, supplied the industry with pressurized water (32 turbines, 200 HP total, and a fountain with a 60-meter jet near the Sust in 1901). Shortly after the inauguration of the left bank railway line in 1875, the terrain where the station was located slid into the lake. The A3 motorway route (1966) caused the disappearance of 12 hectares of forest at Horgener Egg.

== Geography ==
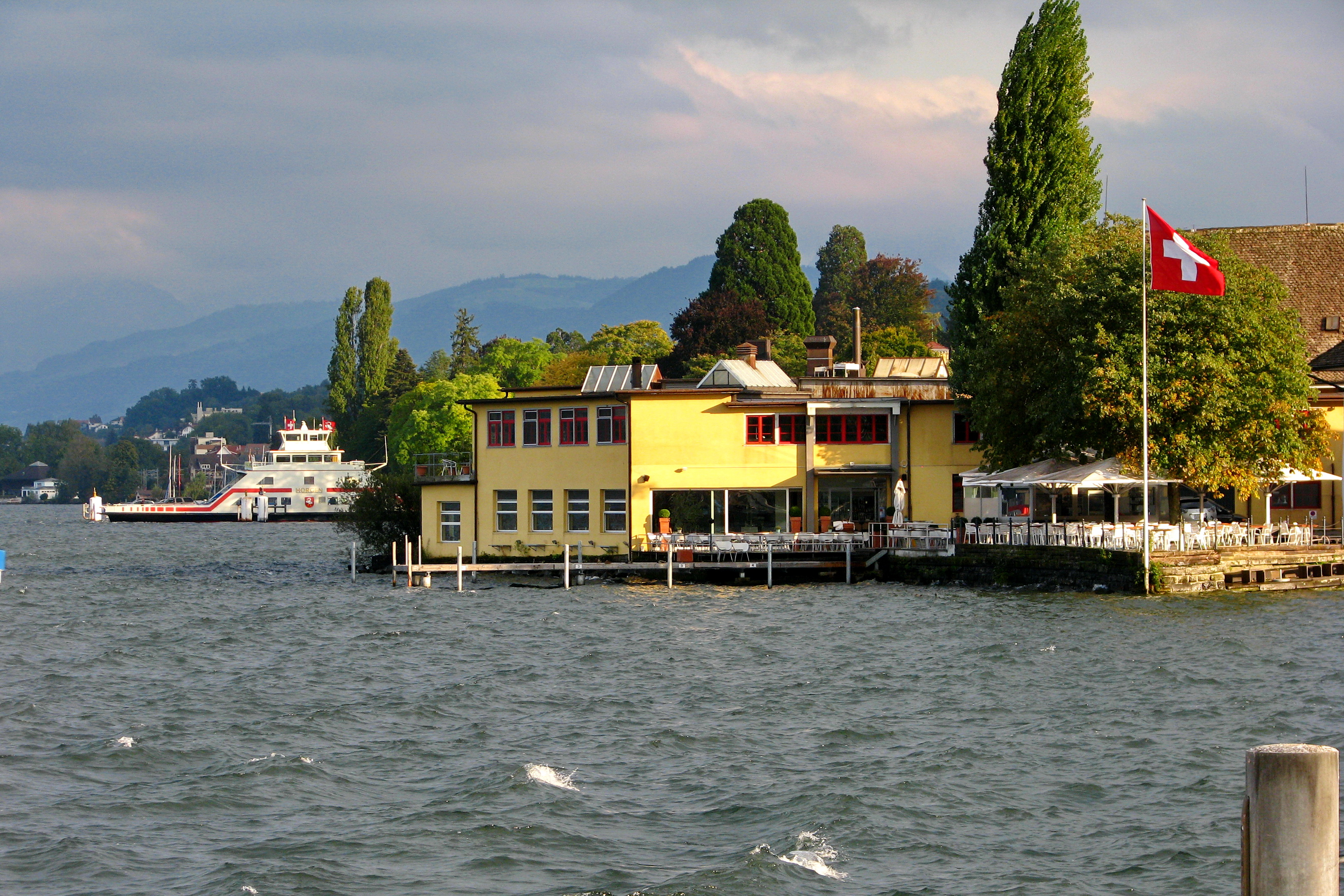
Horgen harbour

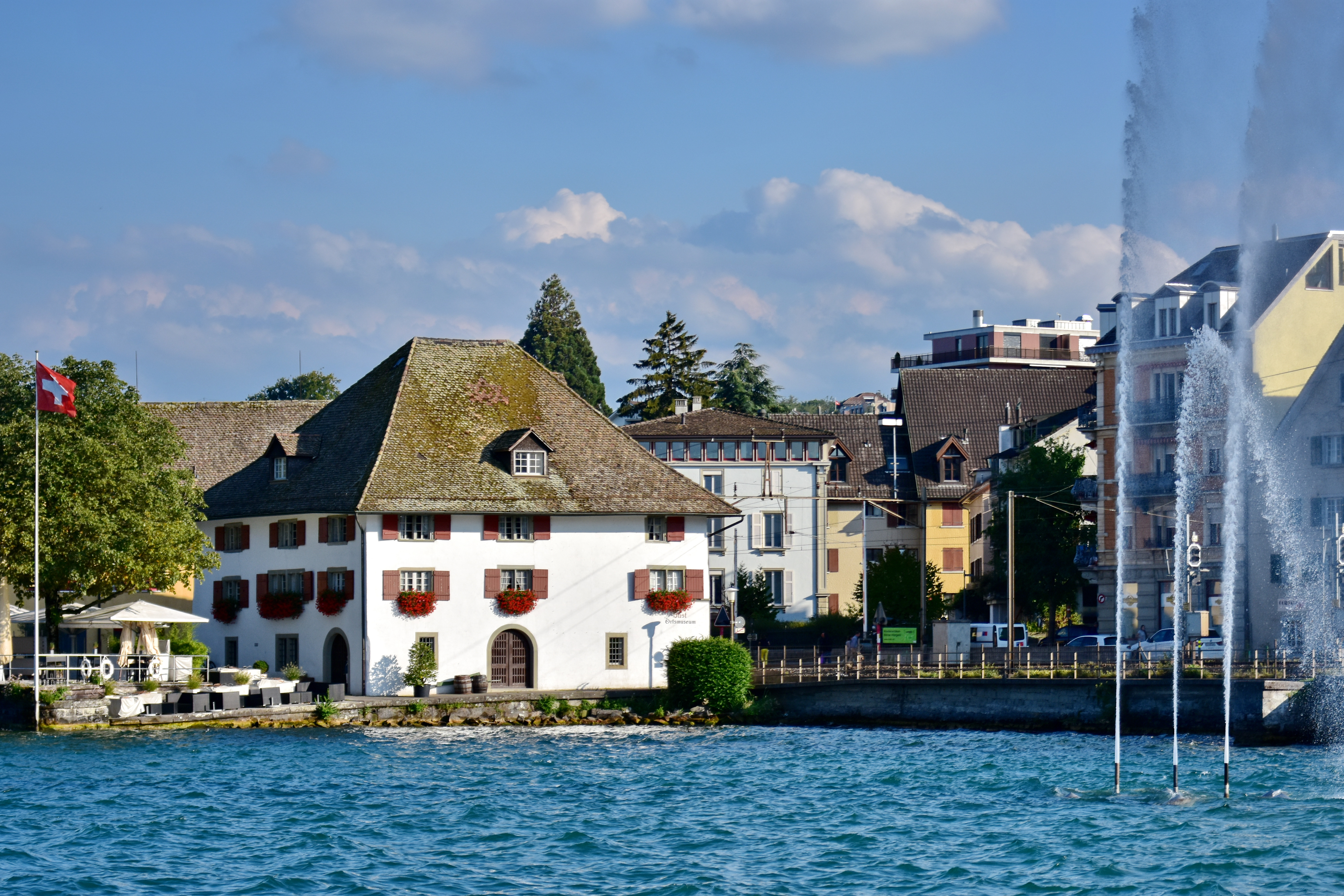
So-called Sust (warehouse) and museum in Horgen

Aerial view from 800 m by Walter Mittelholzer (1919)

Horgen has an area of 21.1 km^{2} (8.1 sq mi). Of this area, 27.7% is used for agricultural purposes, while 49.9% is forested. Of the rest of the land, 20.4% is settled (buildings or roads) and the remainder (2%) is non-productive (rivers, glaciers or mountains). In 1996 housing and buildings made up 12.5% of the total area, while transportation infrastructure made up the rest (7.9%). Of the total unproductive area, water (streams and lakes) made up 1.6% of the area. As of 2007, 16% of the total municipal area was undergoing some type of construction.

The large municipality stretches from the shores of Lake Zurich (elevation 408 m (1,339 ft)), near Wädenswil over the Zimmerberg-Plateau where the decentralized village of Horgenberg is found (elevation 660 m (2,170 ft)), though the Sihl Valley (Sihltal), to the peak of the Albis chain (elevation 915 m (3,002 ft)). It includes the villages of Horgen, Arn and Horgenberg.

Until 1773, Horgen included the now separate municipalities of Oberrieden and Hirzel. The Sihl forest (Sihlwald) became part of the city of Zürich in 1803. However the Horgen city council refused to acknowledge this until 1877.

== Demographics ==
Horgen has a population (as of 31 December 2020) of 23,090. As of 2007, 27.1% of the population was made up of foreign nationals. As of 2008 the gender distribution of the population was 49% male and 51% female. Over the last 10 years the population has grown at a rate of 10.7%. Most of the population (as of 2000) speaks German (79.9%), with Italian being second most common ( 5.7%) and Albanian being third ( 2.8%).

In the 2007 election the most popular party was the SVP which received 35.6% of the vote. The next three most popular parties were the SPS (18.9%), the FDP (15.8%) and the CSP (9.7%).

The age distribution of the population (as of 2000) is children and teenagers (0–19 years old) make up 20.7% of the population, while adults (20–64 years old) make up 64.1% and seniors (over 64 years old) make up 15.2%. In Horgen about 73% of the population (between age 25–64) have completed either non-mandatory upper secondary education or additional higher education (either university or a Fachhochschule). There are 7850 households in Horgen.

Horgen has an unemployment rate of 3.6% as of February 2025. As of 2005, there were 213 people employed in the primary economic sector and about 39 businesses involved in this sector. 2017 people are employed in the secondary sector and there are 167 businesses in this sector. 6892 people are employed in the tertiary sector, with 623 businesses in this sector. As of 2007 56.5% of the working population were employed full-time, and 43.5% were employed part-time.

As of 2008 there were 5924 Catholics and 6170 Protestants in Horgen. In the 2000 census, religion was broken down into several smaller categories. From the census, 39.3% were some type of Protestant, with 36.9% belonging to the Swiss Reformed Church and 2.4% belonging to other Protestant churches. 33.6% of the population were Catholic. Of the rest of the population, 7% were Muslim, 9.5% belonged to another religion (not listed), 4.2% did not give a religion, and 11.7% were atheist or agnostic.

The historical population is given in the following table:

year	population
1467	67 households
1634	1,175
1654	1,560
1780	2,837
1836	2,886
1850	4,844
1900	6,883
1930	9,320
1950	10,118
1970	15,691
2000	17,432
2010	18,935
2020	23,073

== Transportation ==
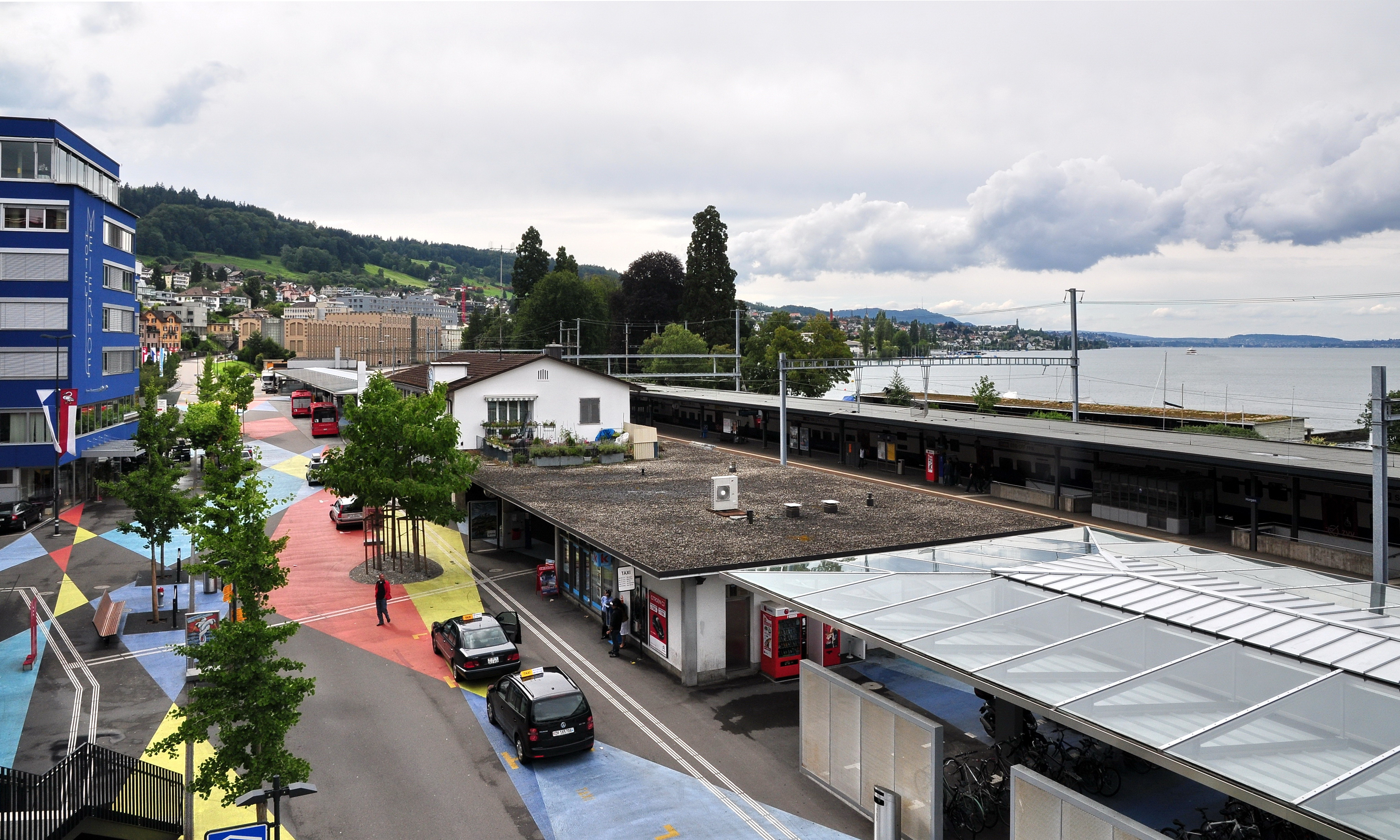
The bus and railway stations at Horgen

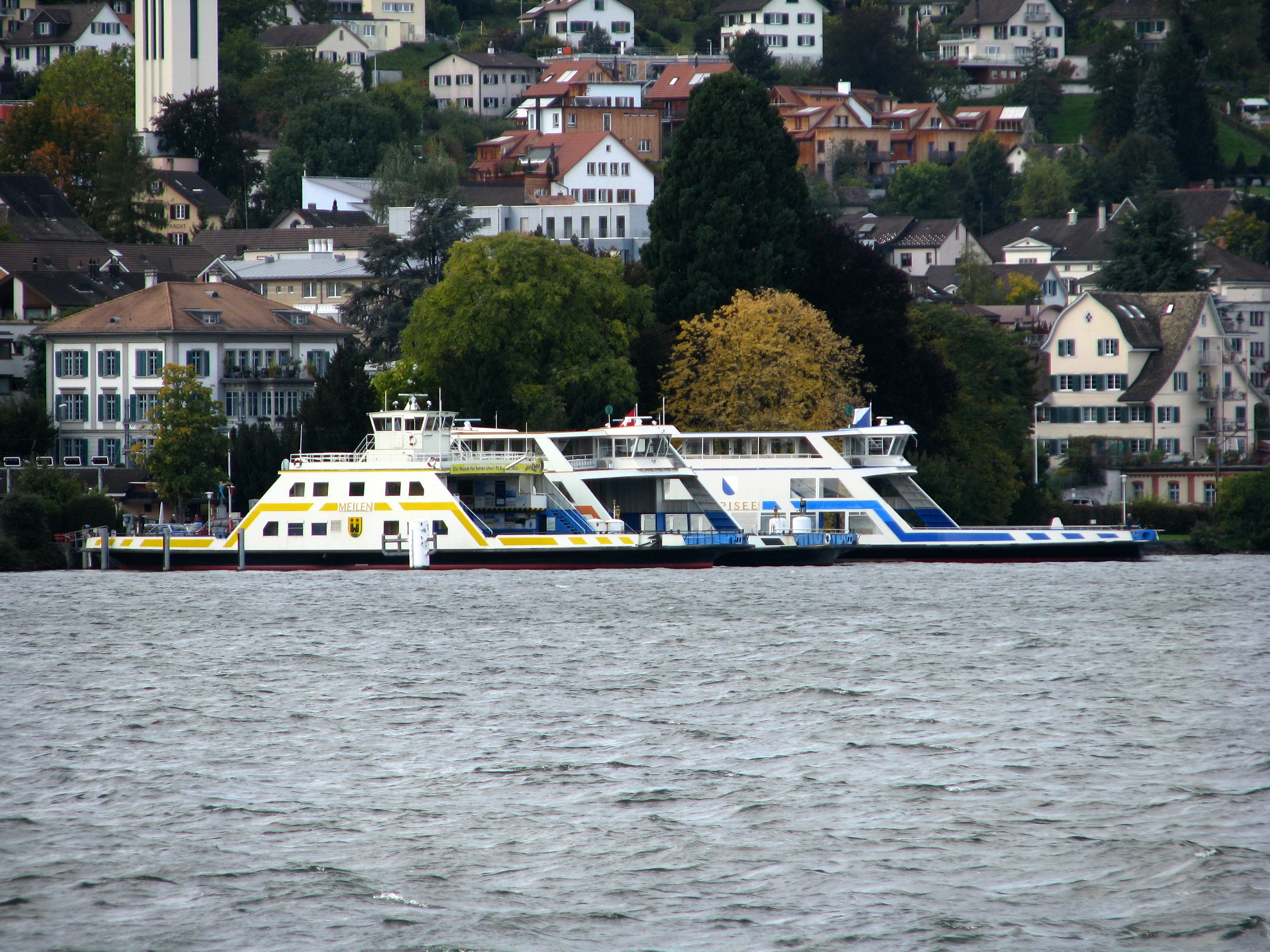
Ferry ships «Meilen», «Schwan» and «Zürisee» at Horgen

The A3 motorway passes through the municipality and has a junction in the south of the town.

The municipality of Horgen is served by three railway stations. Of these two are relatively close to each other in the lakeside part of the municipality, while the other is some distance away from the centre of the town in the Sihl Valley:

- Horgen is on the Lake Zurich left bank line and is served by Zurich S-Bahn lines S2 and S8. The station is in the town centre and adjacent to the lake.
- Horgen Oberdorf is on the Thalwil–Arth-Goldau line, and is served by the S24. Horgen Oberdorf station is some 0.9 kilometres (0.56 mi) uphill from Horgen station.
- Sihlwald is on the Sihltalbahn and is the terminus of the S4. Sihlwald station is in the Sihl Valley, about 4 kilometres (2.5 mi) north of the closed Sihlbrugg station. The Sihtalbahn continues to Sihlbrugg station, but this stretch of line no longer carries regular passenger service.

The Zimmerberg bus line (Zimmerbergbus), provided by the Sihltal Zürich Uetliberg Bahn (SZU), connects the Zimmerberg region and parts of the Sihl Valley.

In the summer there are regular boats to Zürich-Bürkliplatz as well as along the lake to Rapperswil, run by the Zürichsee-Schifffahrtsgesellschaft. The Horgen–Meilen car ferry connects Horgen and Meilen across the width of Lake Zurich, and one of the line's ships carries the name Horgen.

== Reformed Church ==
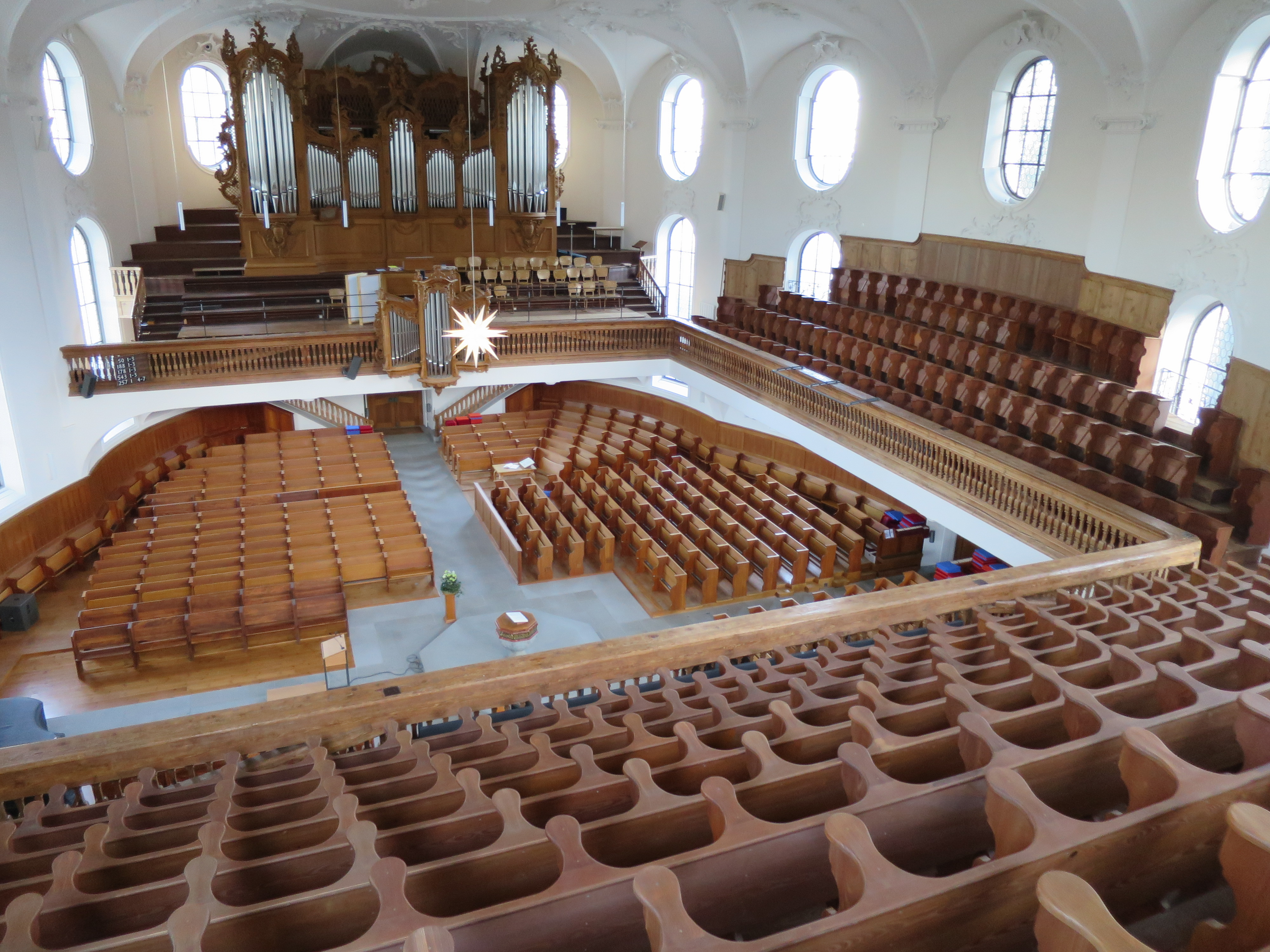
Reformed Church: transverse oval interior

The Horgen Reformed Church by architect Johann Jakob Haltiner, consecrated in 1782, is one of the most important Swiss buildings of Protestant church architecture: The transept became the main church while the nave was omitted, similar to the church of Wädenswil (1767). The transverse oval central church, a bold solution, is based on a circle with a diameter of 17 m. In the main axis, two circles abut each other in the floor plan, which are connected with arc segments of circles of twice the diameter. The determination of the room height can in turn be traced back to circles with a diameter of 17 meters. Haltiner consistently leads this curved floor plan into the roof. The stucco was made by Andreas Moosbrugger at the same time. In 1865 the church received its first stained glass paintings and in 1874 the two fresco paintings on both sides of the pulpit. The first organ from 1884 was replaced by the current one in 1961.

== Notable people ==
- Adele Duttweiler (1892–1990), wife of Gottlieb Duttweiler and philanthropist
- Ernst Sieber (1927–2018), pastor, social worker, writer and former politician who founded Sozialwerke Pfarrer Sieber
- Hoyte van Hoytema (born 1971), cinematographer
- Jacob Wipf, politician
- Steve Lee (1963–2010), musician, former singer of Gotthard
- Andy Schmid, Professional Handballer
