= Franz Vital Lusser =

Swiss civil engineer (1849–1927)

- Born: 28 April 1849; Altdorf, Uri, Switzerland
- Died: 19 September 1927 (aged 78); Zug, Switzerland
- Education: Engineering, ETH Zurich
- Occupations: Civil engineer, contractor
- Known for: Construction of the Albis Tunnel
- Board member of: Kreisdirektion V, Swiss Federal Railways
- Spouse: Rosa Antonia Cavadini (m. 1880)
- Children: 8
- Parent(s): Franz and Aloisia Lusser

Franz Vital Lusser (28 April 1849 – 19 September 1927) was a Swiss civil engineer and contractor who is best known for his involvement with the Gotthard Tunnel and for the construction of the Albis Tunnel.

== Early life and education ==
Lusser was born 28 April 1849 in Altdorf, Switzerland to Franz Lusser and Aloisia Lusser (née Christen). After graduating the schools of Altdorf and the gymnasium in Schwyz, Lusser began his studies of engineering at the Federal Polytechnic Institute of Zurich in 1867 and completed them in 1871.

== Career ==
Lusser's career began at the Building Departement of Zurich. In 1872, when the construction of the Gotthard Tunnel commenced, he joined the Gotthard Railway Company, where he worked under engineers such as Robert Gerwig, Wilhelm Hellwag, and Louis Favre. There, he assisted in the construction of the section Brunnen–Sisikon, and later led the construction of the railway section on the Melide causeway, as well as the construction of the Maroggia Tunnel.

From 1874 to 1881, Lusser directed the construction from the southern end of the Gotthard Tunnel as first engineer and foreman of the Louis Favre company. At the breakthrough of tunnel in 1880, he would hand a photograph of Favre, who had died a year prior, through the borehole to honour his legacy, with following words written on the back:

Qui est plus digne, de passer par le premier, que celui qui nous était patron, ami et père. – Viva il Gottardo!

Who is more worthy, to pass through first, than he who was to us patron, friend and father. – Long live Gotthard!

— 28 February 1880, Lusser

After the breakthrough of the Gotthard Tunnel, Lusser would move on to oversee the expansion of Chiasso railway station from 1881 to 1882. For the next 10 years, he went abroad, where he worked on the Belgrad–Vranje railway section in Serbia and the Lefke railway section in Turkey with the Anatolian Railway Company.

Lusser returned to Switzerland in 1892 to lead the construction of the Albis Tunnel on the Thalwil-Arth-Goldau railway. Although he had initially failed to gather enough funds for the required security deposit the first time the NOB published an invitation to tender, he was able to secure the contract the second time after founding the Franz Lusser & Cie company. Notably, he was able to complete it one year earlier than planned in 1894 and below budget, despite it being the second-longest tunnel of Switzerland at that time.

Afterwards, Lusser opened an engineering bureau in Zug where he would offer consultancy services. As a consultant, he was involved with the construction of multiple power plants, as well as with tunnels such as the Albula Tunnel in the Grisons and the Bohinj Tunnel, his last project abroad.

In 1910, the Federal Council elected Lusser as vice president for the Kreisdirektion V (directorate of the Gotthard railway) at the Swiss Federal Railways; he took office on 1 April of the same year. However, by 31 December 1910, he was forced to step down as he had suffered a stroke and was partially paralyzed as a result.

== Personal life ==
Lusser married Rosa Cavadini, the sister of his best work colleague, on 18 January 1880. Together, they had eight children. After having led a busy lifestyle on the move due to his work, the Lussers finally settled in Zug in 1906.

Lusser died in 1927 in Zug at the age of 78 as a result of a lung infection following an operation.
