= Zimmerbergbus =

Bus network in Horgen District, Switzerland

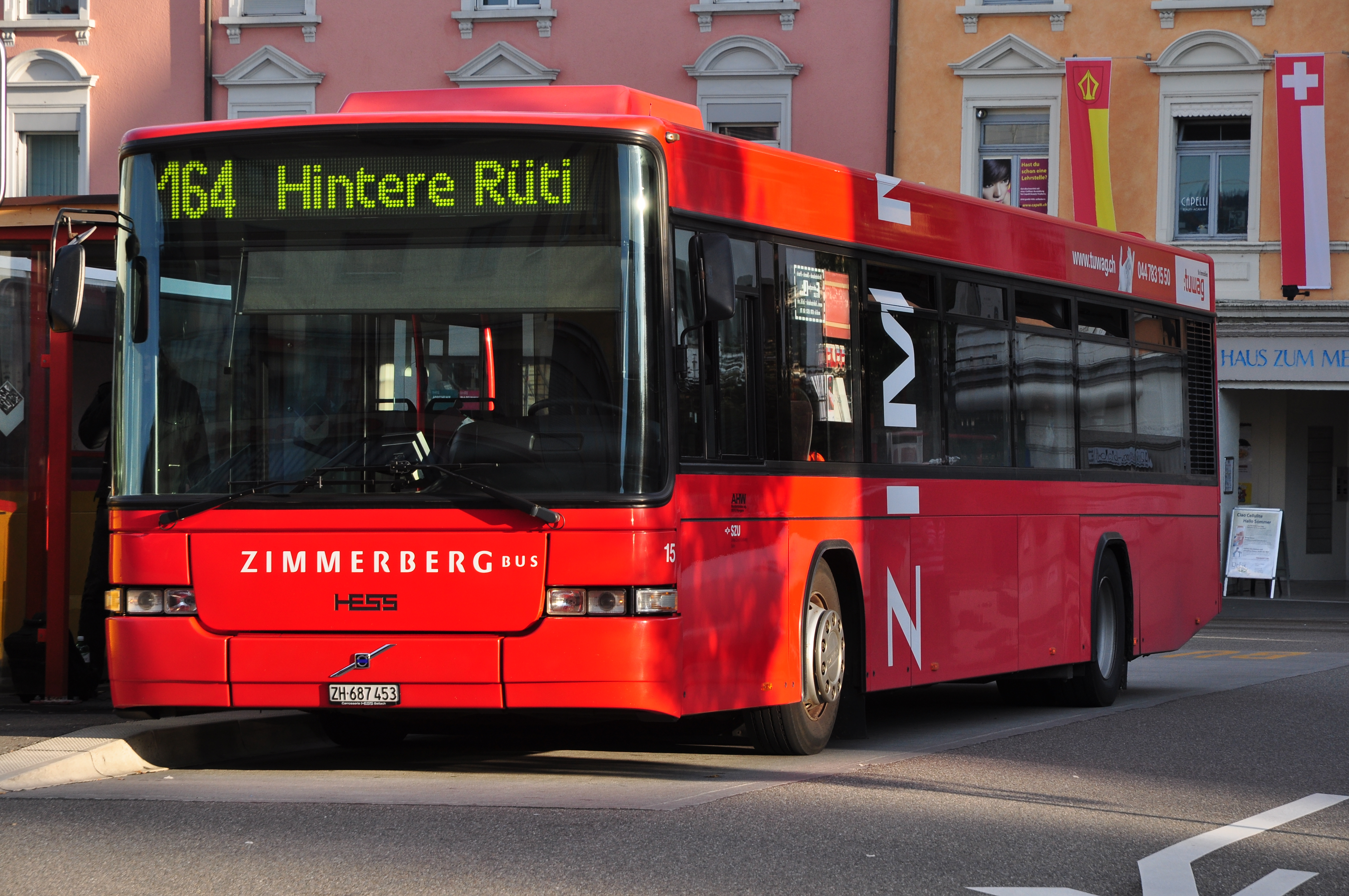
Zimmerbergbus in Wädenswil

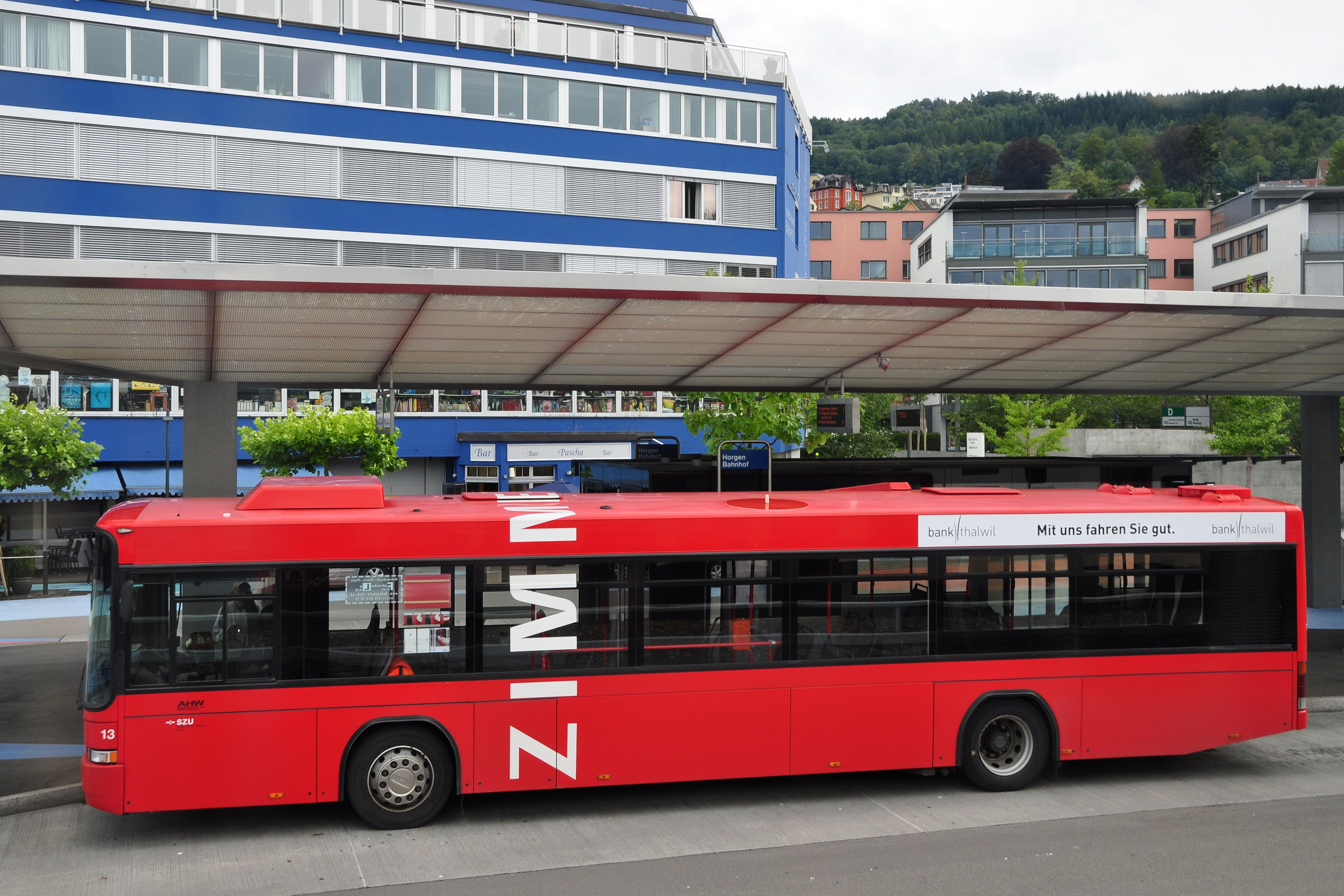
A bus at Horgen railway station.

The Zimmerbergbus is a bus network in the Horgen District in Switzerland, operated by the Sihltal Zürich Uetliberg Bahn (SZU) and its local partner firms. The network is named after the Zimmerberg. It has an annual ridership of 10 million.

== Network ==
Zimmerbergbus has 25 daytime lines and four night lines. These are operated by four companies: AHW Busbetriebe AG, Busbetriebe Bamert GmbH, Leuthold Transfer AG, and PostAuto Schweiz AG. Zimmerbergbus has an annual ridership of 10 million.

The Sihltal Zürich Uetliberg Bahn AG is one of eight "market-responsible companies" (German: marktverantwortliche Verkehrsunternehmen) of the Zürcher Verkehrsverbund (ZVV), which means it is responsible for the maintenance of bus stops and providing information for customers. The concession area of Zimmerbergbus includes the municipalities of Adliswil, Langnau am Albis, Thalwil, Oberrieden, Horgen, Wädenswil, and Richterswil. This constitutes all of Horgen District aside from Kilchberg and Rüschlikon, which are served by the Verkehrsbetriebe Zürich (VBZ).

In 2008, the network was 166.5 km (103.5 mi) long and had 201 stops. Ridership was 6.94 million people.

== See also ==
- Transport in Switzerland
- List of bus operating companies in Switzerland
