= Stadt Zürich =

Stadt Zürich may refer to:

- Zürich, a city in Switzerland
- Stadt Zürich (ship, 1855), a Swiss paddle steamer
- Stadt Zürich (ship, 1909), a Swiss paddle steamer
