= Carl Fierz-Landis =

Swiss financier (1852–1892)

- Born: Carl Fierz; 28 June 1852; Fluntern, Zurich, Switzerland
- Died: 23 March 1892 (aged 39); Nice, France
- Occupation: Financier
- Spouse: Hedwig Landis (m. 1875)
- Children: Maria Fierz
- Father: Heinrich Fierz

Carl Fierz-Landis (born Carl Fierz; 28 June 1852 – 23 March 1892) was a Swiss financier from Zurich. After his father's death in 1877, he left the family firm and worked as a financier for the buyback of the railways and founded banks in Switzerland and abroad. His conduct in the failed buyback of the Nordostbahn led to his resignation from the board of the Schweizerische Kreditanstalt in 1887. He gave Schwandegg Castle to the city of Zurich with a view to the establishment of the Swiss National Museum.

== Biography ==
Carl Fierz was born on 28 June 1852 in Fluntern, now part of the city of Zurich, the son of Heinrich Fierz. In 1875 he married Hedwig Landis, daughter of Johannes Landis, a physician. Their daughter Maria Fierz was born in Richterswil in 1878.

Fierz attended primary school in Zurich and private schools in Teufen and Grenchen. From about 1869 he worked in his father's business, and at the age of twenty he spent two years in Brazil. After his father's death in 1877 he left the firm.

Fierz then worked as a financier for the buyback (Rückkauf) of the railways and founded banks in Switzerland and abroad. His involvement was judged as a service to the fatherland, but also as speculation. His conduct in the failed buyback of the Nordostbahn led to his resignation from the board of directors (Verwaltungsrat) of the Schweizerische Kreditanstalt in 1887.

Fierz gave Schwandegg Castle (Schloss Schwandegg) to the city of Zurich with a view to the establishment of the Swiss National Museum (Landesmuseum). He died in Nice on 23 March 1892.

== Bibliography ==
- J. Hardmeier-Jenny (ed.), Blätter der Erinnerung an Carl Fierz-Landis, 1892
- Neue Zürcher Zeitung, 26, 29 and 30 March 1892
- G. von Schulthess-Rechberg, Worte der Erinnerung an Carl Fierz-Landis, 1892
