= Jura (1854 ship) =

Wooden, flush deck, paddle steamer,

Coordinates: 47°39′00″N 09°13′00″E

History

Switzerland Bavaria
- Name: Jura
- Owner: Lake Neuchâtel Steamboat Society (Société des Bateaux à vapeur du lac du Neuchâtel); Lindau Steamship Navigation Inspectorate; (Lindauer Dampfschiffahrtsinspektion)
- Builder: Escher-Wyss, Zürich
- In service: 7 November 1854
- Fate: sunk in 1864

General characteristics
- Class & type: Merchant ship
- Type: Paddle steamer
- Length: 46.3 metres (152 ft)
- Beam: 10.25 metres (33.6 ft)
- Draught: max. 0.9 metres (2 ft 11 in)
- Installed power: 45 hp (33 kW)
- Propulsion: Steam engine driving 2 paddle wheels
- Speed: 10 kn (19 km/h)
- Capacity: 400

The Jura was a wooden, flush deck, paddle steamer, originally built for service on Lake Neuchâtel, but which was sold after seven years to work on Lake Constance, and sank in 1864 after a collision with the Stadt Zürich.

== History ==
The Jura was built in 1854 by the Maschinen Fabrik Escher-Wyss in Zürich. On 7 September that same year the ship was placed in service by the Lake Neuchâtel Steamboat Society (Société des Bateaux à vapeur du lac du Neuchâtel) on Lake Neuchâtel.

In 1861, the ship was put up for sale and purchased by the Lindau Steamship Navigation Inspectorate (Lindauer Dampfschiffahrtsinspektion) as a replacement for the Ludwig which had sunk after a collision. For its transportation to Lake Constance, the ship was dismantled and moved on horse-drawn carts. The ship had a total length of 46.30 metres (151.9 ft); its length at the waterline being 41.30 metres (135.5 ft), and it had a beam of 10.25 metres (33.6 ft) draught of about 90 centimetres (35 in). The Jura was powered by a 45-horsepower steam engine, which gave it a top speed of 18.5 kilometres per hour (11.5 mph). It could carry up to 400 passengers.

== Sinking ==
On 12 February 1864, the Jura set sail on a routine service from Constance via Romanshorn to Lindau. Around 11 a.m., and despite having a fog lookout, signal horns and an attempt at taking avoiding action, it could not prevent a collision with the Stadt Zürich off Münsterlingen. The bow of the Stadt Zürich ripped the Jura's forecastle off. The person manning the fog lookout of the Bavarian ship was crushed and a ship's boy had his arm torn off. Within just four minutes, the Jura sank. The rest of the ship's crew and passengers were rescued by the Stadt Zürich.

Because the Stadt Zürich had sunk the Ludwig in a collision less than three years before, and, only a few months after sinking the Jura, had collided with the Stadt Lindau in Lindau Harbour, the ship was especially unpopular in Bavaria.

== Discovery of the wreck ==
In February 1953, Ludwig Hain was looking for a crashed World War II aircraft in the lake off Bottighofen when he chanced upon the wreck of the ship at a depth of about 39 metres (128 ft). After that, the wreck was forgotten until, in 1976, it was rediscovered by Hans Gerber. The ship, which has since become known by scuba divers as the "best known freshwater wreck in Europe" lies almost upright on its keel on the lake bed. The bow of the ship is covered in mud which was dumped at this spot after dredging work for the harbour at Kreuzlingen.

From the wreck of the Jura were salvaged the 47-kilogramme ship's bell, bottles, a manometer and the name of the ship.

== Recovery plans and industrial monument ==
A recovery of the ship would be attractive because the Jura is the oldest surviving steamship in the world. It would make available a ship of the late Biedermeier period, an era from which there are hardly any surviving technical monuments.

The Lake Constance Historical Navigation stiftung (Historische Schifffahrt Bodensee) with its headquarters in the Swiss village of Tägerwilen has plans to recover and restore the ship. The cost is estimated at around 3.5 million euros, because the ship's wooden hull and folding chimney are in a poor condition. Sports divers are partly to blame, as is the aforementioned dumping of mud on the wreck, damage as a result of regular shipping and fishing, and, of course, the passage of time.

On 7 December 2004, the governing council of the Canton of Thurgau declared the Jura as an "Underwater Industrial Monument", placed it under protection and empowered the Office of Archaeology in Frauenfeld to look into the possibility of a recovery operation or an archaeological investigation of the wreck. The ship was to be protected from further damage through a cooperation of the Office of Archaeology, the sports diving clubs of Austria, Germany and Switzerland and the Wasserschutzpolizei.

The restored or even reconstructed ship, together with the Hohentwiel built in 1913 and the steamship Gustav Prym built in 1916 would be used to show the development of shipping on Lake Constance. This fleet of classic ships will be enhanced by the Konstanz, built in 1928 and therefore the oldest European car ferry on an inland waters.

== Exhibitions ==
- 31 August 2016–present: Geschichten vom Seegrund. The Dampfschiff Jura. at the Kreuzlingen Maritime Museum.
