= Marta von Meyenburg =

Swiss social work educator (1882–1972)

- Born: 10 November 1882; Dresden, German Empire
- Died: 10 March 1972 (aged 89); Oberrieden, Zurich, Switzerland
- Occupation: School head
- Partner: Maria Fierz
- Parents: Viktor von Meyenburg (father); Konstanze von May (mother)
- Relatives: Hans Caspar Escher (great-grandfather)

Marta von Meyenburg (10 November 1882 – 10 March 1972) was a Swiss educator in social work. With her life partner Maria Fierz she founded the Women's School of Social Work (Soziale Frauenschule) in Zurich, and as its first head from 1921 to 1934 she built up the vocational training of women social workers. In 1914 she co-founded the Zurich Frauenzentrale. In 1945 the University of Zurich awarded her an honorary doctorate.

== Biography ==
Marta von Meyenburg was born on 10 November 1882 in Dresden, the daughter of the sculptor Viktor von Meyenburg and Konstanze née von May, daughter of Friedrich von May, a lawyer. She was a great-granddaughter of Hans Caspar Escher. She remained unmarried.

Von Meyenburg attended the Swiss nursing school (Schweizerische Pflegerinnenschule) in Zurich and then worked for the Zurich official guardianship office (Amtsvormundschaft). From 1910 she led welfare courses for women (Fürsorgekurse).

Together with her life partner Maria Fierz, von Meyenburg founded the Women's School of Social Work in Zurich. As its first head (Schulleiterin) from 1921 to 1934 she built up the vocational training of women social workers (Sozialarbeiterinnen) and promoted the professionalization of women's welfare work.

In 1914 von Meyenburg was a co-founder of the Frauenzentrale of Zurich, and she sat on its board until 1947. From 1934 to 1957 she was a member of the board of the Swiss nursing school in Zurich. In the civilian women's auxiliary service (ziviler Frauenhilfsdienst, FHD) she worked for the spiritual national defense (Geistige Landesverteidigung). In 1945 she received an honorary doctorate from the University of Zurich. She died in Oberrieden on 10 March 1972.

== Works ==
- "Erlebte Wandlungen in sozialer Frauenarbeit", in Carla Büttiker, Frauen der Tat 1850–1950, 1951, 106–126 (Schweizerischer Frauenkalender, 1951)

== Bibliography ==
- Neue Zürcher Zeitung, 15 March 1972 (obituary)
- Schweizer Frauenblatt, 30 March 1972 (obituary)
