= Maria Fierz =

Swiss social worker (1878–1956)

- Born: 27 March 1878; Richterswil, Zurich, Switzerland
- Died: 13 September 1956 (aged 78); Oberrieden, Zurich, Switzerland
- Occupation: Social worker
- Partner: Marta von Meyenburg
- Parents: Carl Fierz-Landis (father); Hedwig Landis (mother)
- Relatives: Heinrich Fierz (grandfather)

Maria Fierz (27 March 1878 – 13 September 1956) was a Swiss social worker and women's rights activist from Zurich. She promoted the professionalization of social work, presided over the Zurich women's liaison center (Frauenzentrale) from 1917 to 1944 and, with Marta von Meyenburg, initiated the Women's School of Social Work in Zurich, which opened in 1921. In 1933 she called on women's organizations to unite in the working group Woman and Democracy, which she presided over.

== Biography ==
Maria Fierz was born on 27 March 1878 in Richterswil, the daughter of Carl Fierz-Landis and Hedwig Landis. Through her father she was a granddaughter of Heinrich Fierz. She remained unmarried and grew up in Zurich. Because her family refused her permission to study, she trained as a social worker in London from 1901 to 1903. She then worked in Zurich for the women's charitable association (Gemeinnütziger Frauenverein) and did an internship with the city's poor relief office for residents (Einwohnerarmenpflege).

In 1908 Fierz and Mentona Moser ran the first welfare course for women (Fürsorgekurs). From then on she promoted the professionalization of social work. In 1917 she took over the leadership of the Frauenzentrale in Zurich, and as its president until 1944 she was very active in coordinating women's relief work and in efforts to improve women's vocational training and working conditions. After the general strike of 1918 she also founded the women's groups (Frauengruppen) of Zurich, intending to help overcome class antagonism.

With her life partner Marta von Meyenburg, Fierz initiated the founding of the Women's School of Social Work (Soziale Frauenschule), which opened in Zurich in 1921; she sat on its board until 1948. In 1928 she was elected to the poor relief commission (Kommission für Armenpflege) of the city of Zurich.

Alarmed by the Frontenfrühling (the "spring of the Fronts"), Fierz called on women's organizations in 1933 to unite in the working group Woman and Democracy (Arbeitsgemeinschaft Frau und Demokratie). As its president she organized conferences and lectures to counter anti-democratic tendencies. From 1935 to 1940 she also sat on the board of the Federation of Swiss Women's Associations (Bund Schweizerischer Frauenvereine).

Although her public work centered on social issues, Fierz always campaigned for women's political equality as well. She was a committed pacifist and was close to religious socialism. She died in Oberrieden on 13 September 1956.

== Bibliography ==
- Neue Zürcher Zeitung, 18 September 1956 (obituary)
- Schweizer Frauenblatt, 21 and 28 September 1956
- Marta von Meyenburg, Aus dem Leben von Maria Fierz, 1878–1956, 1957 (compiled at the request of the deceased)
