= Viktor von Meyenburg =

Swiss sculptor (1834–1893)

- Born: 25 September 1834; Schaffhausen, Switzerland
- Died: 16 February 1893 (aged 58); Dresden, German Empire
- Occupation: Sculptor
- Spouse: Konstanze von May (m. 1866)
- Children: Marta von Meyenburg
- Father: Franz Anselm von Meyenburg

Viktor von Meyenburg (25 September 1834 – 16 February 1893) was a Swiss sculptor from Schaffhausen. After training in Munich and Berlin and a stay in Rome, he lived in Zurich from 1862 and in Dresden from 1869 until his death. He was committed to the realistically tempered classicism of his teachers. Besides numerous busts, his works include the figure Theseus, a gift to the Schaffhausen art society, the sandstone figure Hadlaub in Zurich, destroyed in 1990, and decorative work on the Polytechnikum and the Landesmuseum in Zurich.

== Biography ==
Viktor von Meyenburg was born on 25 September 1834 in Schaffhausen, the son of Franz Anselm von Meyenburg. In 1866 he married Konstanze von May, daughter of Friedrich von May, a lawyer, and granddaughter of Hans Caspar Escher (1775–1859). Their daughter was the social work educator Marta von Meyenburg.

While still a schoolboy, von Meyenburg took lessons from the sculptor and painter Johann Jakob Oechslin, and he then served a two-year apprenticeship as a sculptor in Oechslin's workshop. From 1856 he studied at the Munich Academy under Max Widnmann, and in 1859 he was in the Berlin studio of Hugo Hagen. From 1859 to 1862 he stayed in Rome. From 1862 he lived in Zurich, and from 1869 until his death in Dresden.

Von Meyenburg was committed to the realistically tempered classicism (realistisch gemilderter Klassizismus) of his teachers. Besides numerous busts, his works include above all the figure Theseus (around 1860; Museum zu Allerheiligen), a gift to the Schaffhausen art society (Kunstverein), and the life-size ideal figure Hadlaub in sandstone (1884, on the Platzpromenade in Zurich, destroyed in 1990). He also made decorative works for the Polytechnikum (ETH Zurich) and the Landesmuseum (Swiss National Museum) in Zurich. In Dresden he made, among other works, the figures Wiese (after the poem by Johann Peter Hebel), Echo and Saint Cecilia. He died in Dresden on 16 February 1893.

== Bibliography ==
- Schweizerisches Künstler-Lexikon, 2, 378–379
- Museum zu Allerheiligen Schaffhausen, Kunstabteilung, Katalog der Gemälde und Skulpturen, 1989
