= John Hinde (photographer) =

British photographer (1916–1997)

- Born: John Wilfrid Hinde; 17 May 1916; Street, Somerset, England
- Died: 26 December 1997 (aged 81); Brive-la-Gaillarde, Dordogne, France
- Occupation: Photographer
- Known for: Photos of Butlin's holiday camps
- Spouse: Antonia "Jutta" Falnoga (m. 1952)
- Children: 5

John Wilfrid Hinde (17 May 1916 – 26 December 1997) was an English photographer, whose idealistic and nostalgic style influenced the art of postcard photography and was widely known for his meticulously planned shoots.

His interest in colour photography arose during the 1940s. From the later half of the 1940s to the middle half of the 1950s, he entered the circus life, where he met his future wife. However, he soon returned to photography and, in 1956, he left the circus and founded John Hinde Ltd. in Dublin to produce and distribute his colour pictures of Ireland. Hinde's most famous work is that of the Butlin's holiday camps, in which he portrayed a welcoming and jubilant environment. In 1972, he sold his company to pursue his love of painting. The Irish Museum of Modern Art recognised his work with a retrospective in Dublin in 1993. In 1997, Hinde died in Dordogne, France. At the time of his death, millions of his postcards had been sold worldwide.

== Early life ==
John Wilfrid Hinde was born in Street, Somerset on 17 May 1916, in a close-knit Quaker community. He stuck to his Quaker values during the war by becoming a photographer for the civil defence forces instead of a soldier. Some of his photography was published in colour magazines and books, such as Of Cabbages and Kings, Citizens of War, and British Circus Life. His interest in photography would lead him to become an important pioneer in colour photographs.

== The circus ==
Hinde briefly switched professions when he became a circus publicity manager in 1944. Here, he met his wife Antonia "Jutta" Falnoga, a trapeze artist for the circus; they married in 1952 and had five children, three sons and two daughters. In 1954, he and Antonia started their own travelling circus company in Ireland named "The John Hinde Show." This venture quickly failed however and Hinde quit the circus business in 1956. He returned to his life as a photographer, and that same year, he founded John Hinde Ltd in Dublin.

== Ireland photography ==
While travelling with the circus for twelve years, and in the years after, he began to take colour photographs of the Irish countryside. During this time, Ireland was becoming a popular destination for tourists. Black and white postcards were favoured because it was felt that this method could better capture the romantic landscape of Ireland. Hinde, a colour photographer, tried to find a way in which he could achieve the same or better effect with the addition of colour, something that would set his pictures apart from all the others. He hoped to capture the vividness of the Irish countryside, as well as the imagination of his audience. With much thought, he came up with a method that blended Irish stereotypes (donkeys, red-headed children, etc.) and the lush, seemingly endless, landscape with bright colours.

Hinde would sometimes enhance colours in his studio to get a desired effect. He was well known for setting up, or changing a scene so that it would fit his strict style. If he found something unpleasant or out of place in his pictures, he could simply cover it up or move it to get the best shot. So common was this practice that he kept a saw in the back of his car so that, if there happened to be an unsightly object in the view of his camera, he would chop down a nearby rhododendron bush and use it to conceal the eyesore. Needless to say, many rhododendron bushes appear in Hinde's Ireland postcards. This series of photographs was a huge success, not only with tourists, but also with the Irish people who enjoyed being reminded of the vibrant environment in which they lived.

== Butlin's ==
From the late 1960s to the early 1970s, Hinde worked on his most widely known production: the Butlin Holiday Camps postcards. Billy Butlin had founded the camps as a place for working-class people to go for vacation, complete with high excitement and low cost. Butlin hired Hinde to produce postcards that reflected the spirited and enjoyable environment found at his camps. By this time, Hinde worked more as an art director than an actual photographer, so he hired two German photographers, Elmar Ludwig and Edmund Nägele, and a British photographer, David Noble. They travelled to the different camps and set up the necessary lights and photography equipment, often taking a whole day to make them just right.

Hinde's pictures portrayed holiday makers taking advantage of all of the things Butlin's had to offer, having a grand old time in the process. The photographers used large format cameras and Ektachrome film to capture the optimistic tone that Butlin was looking for. Scenes from the postcards included people eating in lavishly decorated dining halls, large indoor swimming pools, themed bars, and amusement park rides. Actual holiday makers were used in the shots, but like the Ireland pictures, the sets were often added to, to capture the energetic feeling of the setting. Hinde would often enhance certain colours later on so that the result would be a lively, idealistic view of a Butlin vacation. The combination of the images of a fun-filled family vacation and the vivacious colour produced a nostalgic portrait for the masses.

== Legacy ==
Hinde's postcards were immensely popular, despite Hinde's view that the photographs held no artistic value. In 1972, he decided to sell his company to the Waterford Glass Group to pursue his love of landscape painting.

Even though Hinde never viewed his photographs with much reverence, the Irish Museum of Modern Art recognised his photographic works with a retrospective in Dublin in 1993. Since his death in 1997, exhibits of his photography have travelled all over the world and he proved to be the most successful postcard producer in the world. His works have also been compiled into books, including Hindesight, a collection of the Ireland postcards and Our True Intent Is All For Your Delight, a collection of the Butlin's postcards.

Some of his postcards form the basis for an Irish 30-minute television programme called Cartai Phoist which selects 3 postcards per episode, and using a contemporary Irish artist/celebrity/TV personality, recreates the postcard by finding the original individuals (or their next-of-kin) and standing at the exact spot where the original postcard shot was taken.

== Publications ==
- Hindesight: John Hinde Photographs and Postcards by John Hinde Ltd. 1935–1971. Irish Museum of Modern Art, 1993. ISBN 1-873654-09-X.
- Our True Intent Is All for Your Delight: The John Hinde Butlin's Photographs. By Martin Parr. London: Chris Boot, 2002. ISBN 0-9542813-0-6.
- Nothing to Write Home About: Celebrating the Heyday of the British Holiday Postcard: a Collection of John Hinde Postcards and Their Messages. Compiled by Michelle Abadie & Susan Beale. Friday Books, 2007. ISBN 978-1-905548-36-1.
- Postcards – by Martin Parr and Thomas Weski. London: Chris Boot, 2008. Contains a selection of John Hinde cards among others. ISBN 978-1-905712-10-6.

== General references ==
- http://www.recirca.com/reviews/johnhinde/johnhinde.shtml "Our True Intent Is All For Your Delight: The John Hinde Butlin Photographs", Sarah Browne
- "The Gallery Of Photography Dublin- Presents The John Hinde Butlin's Photographs"
- http://www.wesseloconnor.com/exhibits/hinde/index.php "John Hinde: The Butlin's Holiday Camp Photos"
- http://www.photonet.org.uk/index.php?id=24,138,0,0,1,0 "Our True Intent Is All For Your Delight: The John Hinde Butlin's Photographs"
- http://www.bbc.co.uk/liverpool/culture/2003/01/openeye_butlins/Butlins.shtml "Butlins Delight at the Open Eye", BBC
- https://abadie.co.uk/johnhindebook.html ( the only book of classic John Hinde postcards with the senders messages transcribed)
- Tribune Magazine, Hinde sight, the people in the postcards of a lost Ireland, 25 May 2008, pp10–12.
- "Hindesight" is a 40 minute arts documentary made for RTE-TV (Rep.of Ireland) by Joe Lee to mark the return visit to Ireland of John Hinde and his wife Jutta for the opening of a retrospective exhibition of the photographic and postcard work by John Hinde and his photographic team at the Irish Museum of Modern Art (Dublin) during the summer of 1993. https://www.nagelestock.net/hindesight
