= Elmar Ludwig =

German photographer (born 1935)

Elmar Ludwig (born 1935) is a German photographer.

Ludwig was born in Halle in 1935.

In 1961, John Hinde recruited two German photographers, Ludwig (as head of photographic department) and Edmund Nägele, and one British, David Noble to expand his eponymous postcard business.

Ludwig travelled the world for John Hinde, before establishing his own Munich studio at the end of the 1960s, focused on architecture, product and advertising photography.
