= Stadt Zürich (1855 ship) =

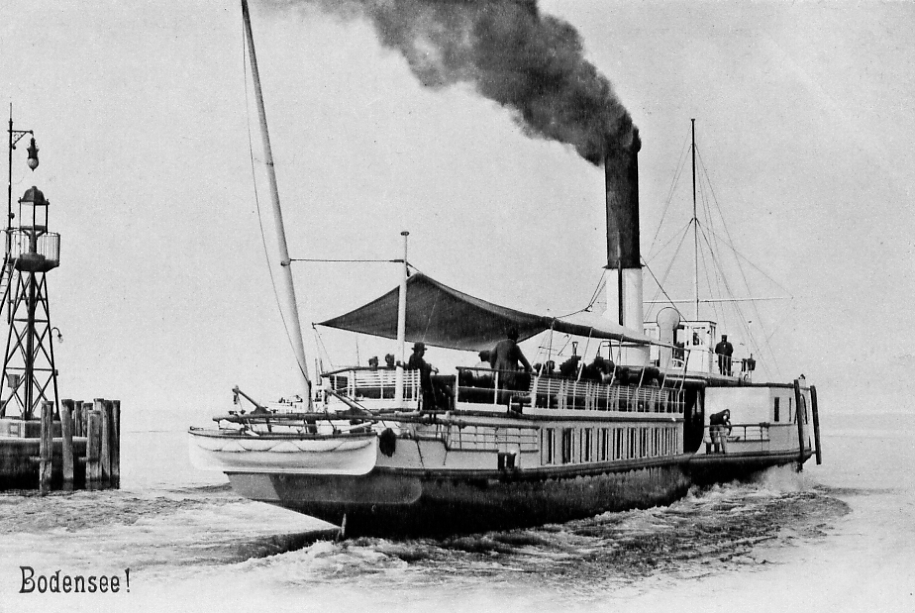
- Stadt Zürich

History

Switzerland
- Name: Stadt Zürich
- Owner: Swiss Northeastern Railway
- Route: Romanshorn
- Builder: Escher Wyss & Cie., Zürich
- Launched: 1855
- Out of service: 1917/1919
- Fate: Scrapped

General characteristics
- Class & type: Merchant ship
- Type: Paddle steamer
- Displacement: 175.5 t
- Length: 49.5 m
- Beam: 9.8 m
- Draught: 1.58 m
- Installed power: 300 hp (221 kW)
- Propulsion: Steam
- Capacity: 300

The Stadt Zürich was a Swiss steamship, built in 1855, that plied Lake Constance. She was given the nickname Teufelsschiff ("Devil's Ship") because she was involved in three serious collisions with other craft and was said to have sunk more German ships than the Danish navy during the Second Schleswig War.

== History ==
The Stadt Zürich, like her sister ship, the Thurgau, was one of the largest and most powerful flush deck steamers on Lake Constance; these ships beginning their service in the mid-1850s. In 1870, the Stadt Zürich underwent her first conversion. In 1884, the ship was converted to be the first half saloon steamer of the Swiss Northeastern Railway fleet and was called, from then on, the Zürich. She was used until the First World War period. Following the scrapping of the Zürich in Romanshorn her paddles were re-used on the paddle steamer, Pilatus from Lucerne.

== Accidents ==
The Stadt Zürich caused "fear and terror" on Lake Constance as the result of three serious collisions in the period from 1860 to 1864, which earned her the nickname "Devil's Ship" (Teufelsschiff).

=== Collision with the Königin von Württemberg ===
On 10 March 1860 the Stadt Zürich rammed the right paddlebox of the Königin von Württemberg ("Queen of Württemberg") off the town of Friedrichshafen. Nobody was killed, but considerable damage was caused.

=== Sinking of the Ludwig ===
On 11 March 1861, almost a year after her first accident, the Stadt Zürich collided with the steamer Ludwig around 18.15 hours in darkness and driving snow. In 1838, the Ludwig had been the first ship on Lake Constance to have a steel monocoque hull (Rumpfschale), but by this time she was relatively old. The captain, who was to have managed the transfer service between Lindau and Rorschach on the day of the accident, had delayed departure until late afternoon due to a severe storm, in order to avoid the worst squalls. This meant though that he had to steer a compass course in poor visibility. The white bow light of the Stadt Zürich approaching from Rorschach was assumed by the crew of the Ludwig to be part of Rorschach's harbour lighting. Meanwhile, nobody on the Stadt Zürich appears to have noticed the iron steamer, but only realised after the collision that the bowsprit was broken and that water was entering the ship. As a result, the Stadt Zürich turned around and returned to Rorschach Harbour, while the Ludwig, unnoticed by her collision partner, sank within a few minutes. Thirteen men and eleven head of cattle died in this accident, making the sinking of the Ludwig by the Stadt Zürich the most serious shipping accident known at that time that had happened on Lake Constance. One consequence of the investigations into the disaster was an improvement in the signal regulations: in addition to the white bow light a green starboard and a red port light had to be carried.

=== Sinking of the Jura ===
After the Bavarian ship, the Ludwig had sunk, the Jura was bought as a replacement, a ship which hitherto had worked on Lake Neuchâtel. She was dismantled, transported to Lake Constance on carts, reassembled there and taken into service. On 12 February 1864, a foggy winter's day, the Jura was meant to sail from Konstanz to Romanshorn and Lindau. In the opposite direction, however, steamed the Stadt Zürich. Although each of the two ships had fog lookouts and were blowing their steam whistles as a signal, they could not avoid a collision. The Jura was being brought about when the bow of the Stadt Zürich stove into her, killing the fog lookout of the Jura. A waitress and the engine driver of the Jura went down with the steamer, which sank within four minutes. The remaining crew and all the passengers of the Jura were saved by the Stadt Zürich, which was able to proceed safely to Romanshorn, despite her buckled bow.

=== Collision with the Stadt Lindau ===
A few months after the sinking of the Jura the Stadt Zürich slit open a paddle box on the Stadt Lindau in Lindau Harbour. A Bavarian correspondent sarcastically commented that the ship should be sold to Denmark as it had already sunk more German ships than the entire Danish navy.

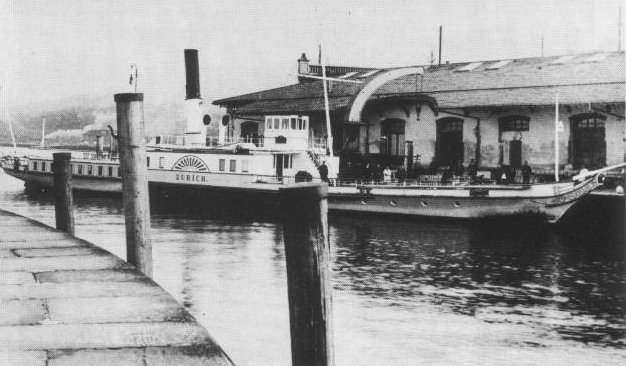
The Zürich c. 1900 in Rorschach

== Literature ==
- Karl F. Fritz, Reiner Jäckle, Das goldene Zeitalter der Schaufelraddampfer auf dem Bodensee, Erfurt, 2013, ISBN 978-3-95400-308-2
- Karl F. Fritz, Abenteuer Dampfschiffahrt auf dem Bodensee, Meersburg, ²1990, ISBN 3-927484-00-8
- List of Lake Constance steamships
