= Edmund Nägele =

German photographer

Edmund Nägele FRPS is a German photographer.

Nägele started his career in a Munich advertising studio, before relocating to Ireland.

In 1962, John Hinde recruited two German photographers, Elmar Ludwig and Edmund Nägele and later one British, David Noble to expand his eponymous postcard business. John Hinde Ltd. sent Nägele to Cyprus around 1969, where he recorded the life and scenery of this beautiful island. Large format film was used to produce postcard subjects, with colour separation and other post-processing being done in Milan – this included removing telegraph poles, television aerials and adding bright colours to vehicles and peoples clothing.

Nägele is remembered for his elaborately staged, colour-saturated images of Butlin's holiday camps taken in the 1960s.

In 1972, Nägele was awarded the Fellowship of the Royal Photographic Society of Great Britain (FRPS) and in 1982, Nägele started his own picture library in the United Kingdom. In 2010, Nägele returned to Bavaria where he enjoys creating contemporary art.
