= Franz Anselm von Meyenburg =

Swiss politician (1788–1864)

- Born: 4 December 1788; Schaffhausen, Old Swiss Confederacy
- Died: 24 August 1864 (aged 75); Basel, Switzerland
- Occupation: Politician
- Spouse: Maria Cleophea Stokar von Neunforn
- Children: Viktor von Meyenburg
- Parents: Balthasar von Meyenburg (father); Barbara Peyer zur Engelburg (mother)

Franz Anselm von Meyenburg (4 December 1788 – 24 August 1864) was a Swiss politician from Schaffhausen. He was a member of the cantonal council and the Small Council, guild master of the fishermen's guild and imperial postmaster, and from 1833 to 1844 Bürgermeister. Swindles and gambling debts forced him to sell Herblingen Castle in 1833, and in 1844 he fled Schaffhausen. After various positions in half of Europe he ended up as an employee of the French railways in Basel.

== Biography ==
Franz Anselm von Meyenburg was born on 4 December 1788 in Schaffhausen, the son of Balthasar von Meyenburg, imperial postmaster (Reichspostmeister) and lord of Herblingen Castle, and Barbara Peyer zur Engelburg. He married Maria Cleophea Stokar von Neunforn, daughter of Franziskus Stokar von Neunforn, a judge (Urteilsprecher) and member of the Grand Council (Grossrat). His son was the sculptor Viktor von Meyenburg.

In 1814 von Meyenburg became a member of the cantonal council (Kantonsrat), and then of the Small Council (Kleinrat). In 1822 he became criminal commissioner (Kriminal-Kommissar) and member of the war council (Kriegsrat), and president of the cantonal police. In 1829 he became guild master (Zunftmeister) of the fishermen's guild (Fischerzunft) and imperial postmaster, and from 1833 to 1844 he was Amtsbürgermeister and Bürgermeister.

Swindles (Hochstapelei) and gambling debts forced von Meyenburg to sell Herblingen Castle in 1833 and the property "Freudenquelle" in 1838. In 1844 he fled Schaffhausen. On behalf of the government of Valais he reorganized the Valais artillery, and after various positions in half of Europe he ended up as an employee of the French railways in Basel. He died in Basel on 24 August 1864.

As a perceptive statesman, von Meyenburg recognized the signs of the new era, but for personal reasons he was too heavily compromised.

== Bibliography ==
- K. Schib, "Franz Anselm von Meyenburg-Stokar", in Schaffhauser Beiträge zur Geschichte, 46, 1969, 192–195

=== Archives ===
- Schaffhausen State Archives (Staatsarchiv Schaffhausen), Schaffhausen: personal files (Personalia)
