= Heinrich Hüni =

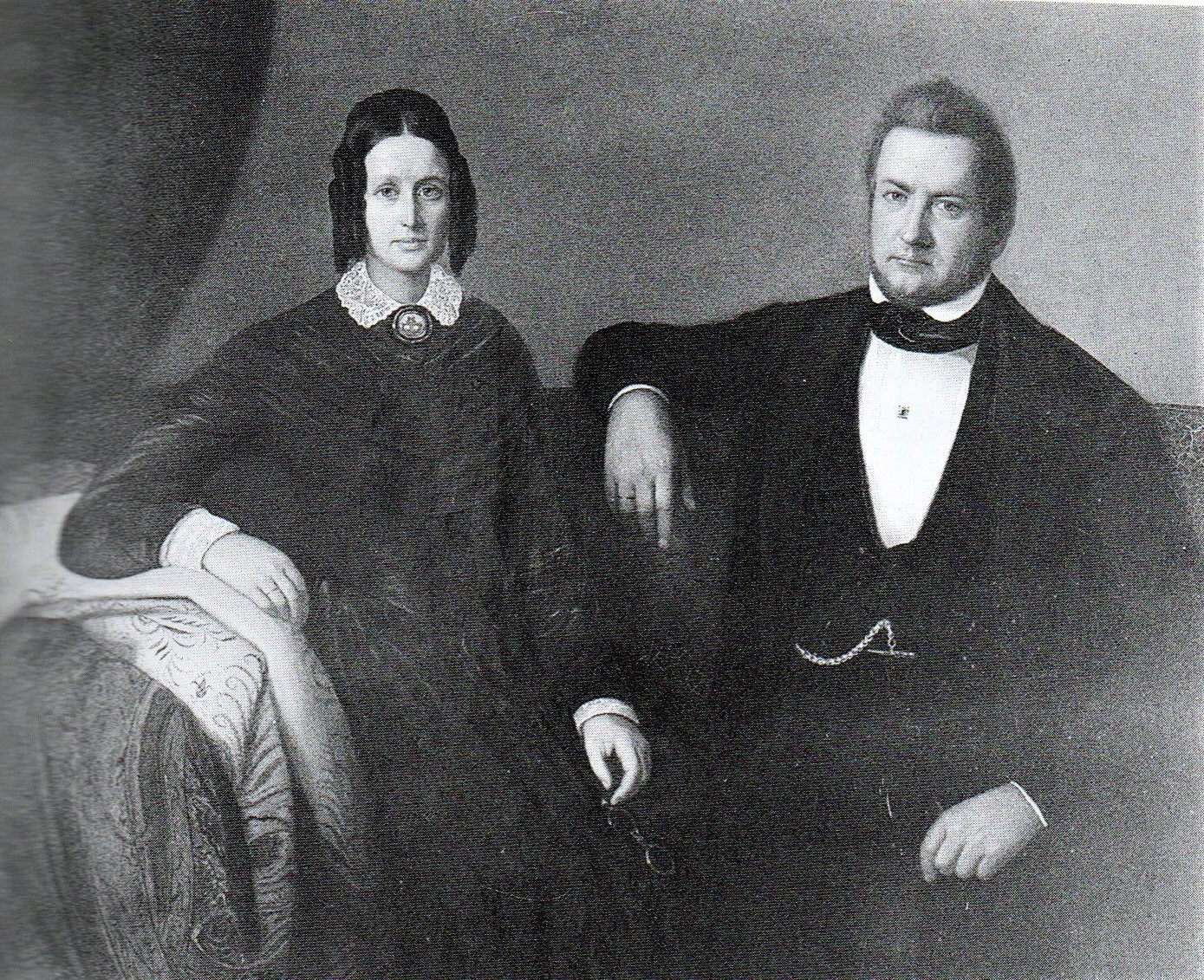
- Hüni (right) with his wife Wilhelmina Hüni (née Stettler)

Member of the National Council (Switzerland)
- In office 4 December 1854 – 2 December 1860
- Constituency: Electoral District Zurich-Southwest

Personal details
- Born: Heinrich Hüni; 16 March 1813 Horgen, Switzerland
- Died: 27 April 1876 (aged 63) Enge, Switzerland (now Zurich, Switzerland)
- Spouse: Wilhelmina Maria Stettler (m. 1837)
- Relations: Emil Streuli (son-in-law)
- Children: 4
- Occupation: Industrialist, politician

Heinrich Hüni colloquially Heinrich Hüni-Stettler (16 March 1813 – 27 April 1876) was a Swiss businessman, industrialist and politician who most notably served on the National Council (Switzerland) from 1854 to 1860. He previously served on the Cantonal Council of Zurich and the Executive Council of Zurich.

Hüni was the son of a farmer and mayor of Horgen, and was born into relatively modest means. He became an independent silk merchant in Zurich and reinvested the proceeds in his own silk mill in Oberrieden, which brought him affluence. In 1843, he founded Hüni & Fierz (a silk mill) in Horgen. He was among the circle of Alfred Escher but was more socially liberal.

== Personal life ==
In 1837, Hüni married Wilhelmina Maria Stettler, daughter of Samuel Stettler, a notary and member of an old Bernese Patrician family, with whom he had four children;

- Emil Hüni (1840–1889)
- Wilhelmina "Mina" Hüni (1841–1924), married to Emil Streuli, who was also a silk manufacturer and later took-over his residence in Horgen. They had four children.
- Heinrich Hüni (1843–1889)
- Emma Hüni (1846–1921), married Giesker

Hüni died 27 April 1876 in Enge (presently a part of Zurich, Switzerland) aged 63.
