= Emil Streuli =

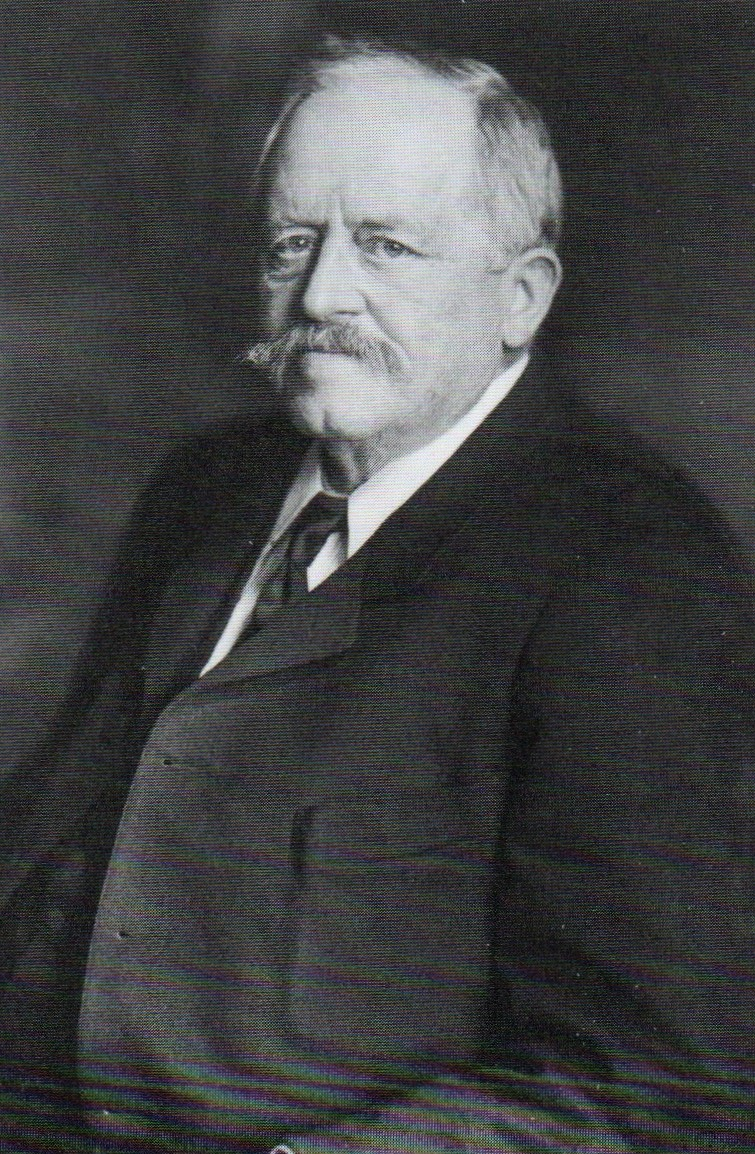
- Streuli c. 1900

Member of the Cantonal Council of Zurich
- In office 1879–1880
- Constituency: Horgen District

Personal details
- Born: Heinrich Emil Streuli; 16 July 1839 Horgen, Switzerland
- Died: 24 November 1915 (aged 76) Horgen, Switzerland
- Citizenship: Switzerland; United States
- Spouse: Wilhelmina Hüni (m. 1864)
- Children: 4
- Education: University of Lausanne
- Occupation: Industrialist, politician

Heinrich Emil Streuli colloquially Emil Streuli-Hüni (16 July 1839 – 24 November 1915) was a Swiss industrialist, philanthropist and politician who served on the Cantonal Council of Zurich from 1879 to 1880 for the Horgen constituency.

Being involved in the silk industry, he presided the firm Baumann & Streuli, which his grandfather founded. Additionally, Streuli served on several boards including, Zurich Insurance, Nestlé, Credit Suisse, Georg Fischer and Salmenbräu Rheinfelden (a brewery).

== Early life and education ==
Streuli was born 16 July 1839 at Heilenbach in Horgen, Switzerland, the oldest of five children, to Hans Kaspar Streuli (1805–1861), a silk manufacturer, and Susanna Karolina Streuli (née Maurer; 1815–1859), into an affluent Protestant family.

He completed the local schools followed by secondary school (Kantonsschule) in Zurich as well as studies at University of Lausanne. He then completed a commercial apprenticeship in a silk house and ultimately a trainee program in New York City.

== Professional career ==
After his apprenticeship in Switzerland, common at the time in the silk industry, Streuli moved to New York City for a trainee program at Ashma's, a silk store located close toBroadway in Manhattan, in 1858. He remained there and even became an American citizen, ultimately retaining dual citizenship.

In 1861, aged 22, he had to abruptly return to Switzerland, after his fathers passing entering the silk manufacturing business of his family in Horgen. He led the company until his passing.

== Politics ==
Streuli served on the Cantonal Council of Zurich from 1879 to 1880 for the Horgen constituency. He previously served on the municipal council of Horgen as well as a member of the church administration.

== Personal life ==
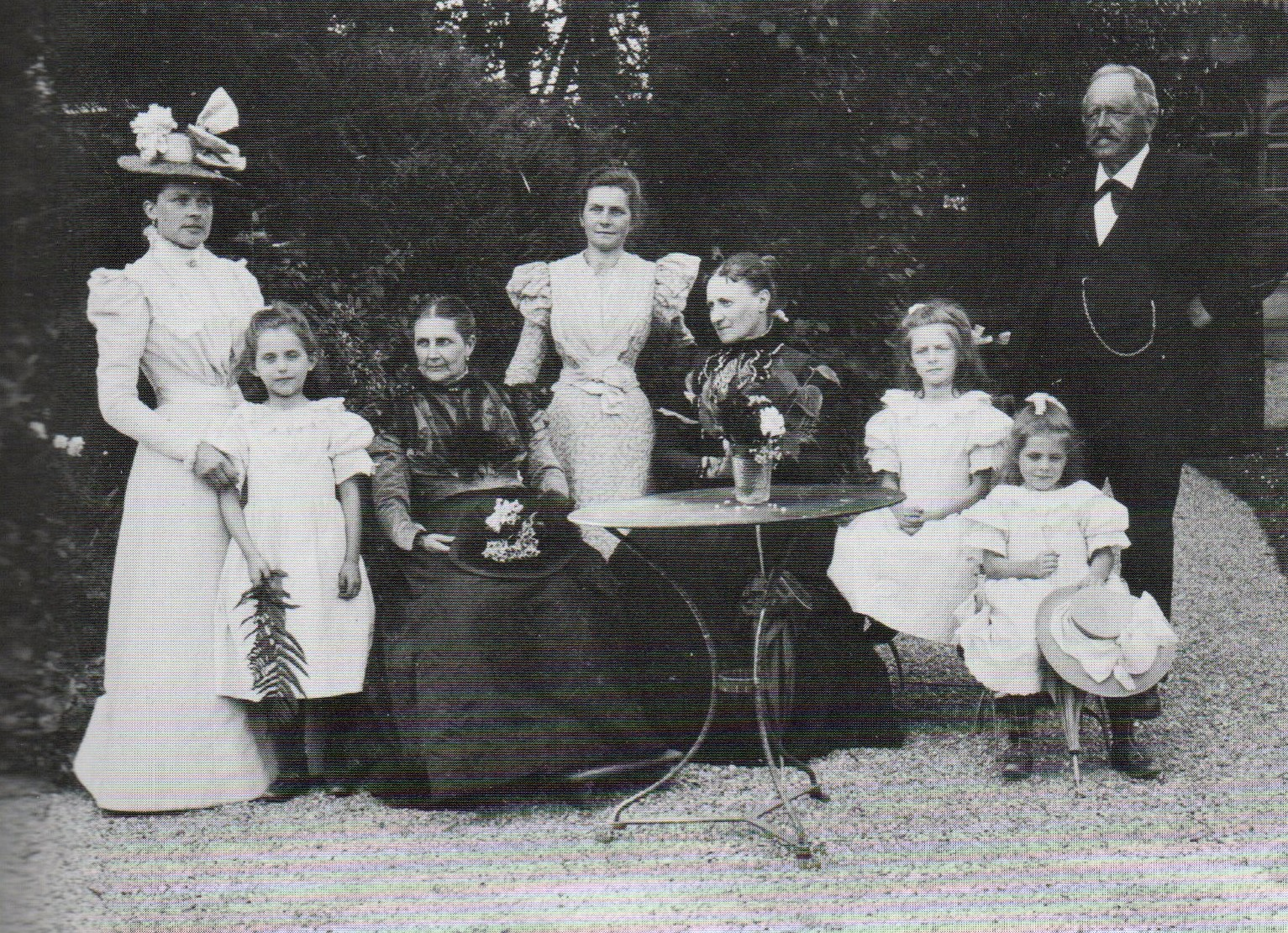
Streuli family about 1900

In 1864, Streuli married Wilhelmine "Mina" Hüni (1841–1924), the daughter of Heinrich Hüni and Wilhelmine Maria Hüni (née Stettler) in Horgen on Lake Zurich. His father-in-law was a wealthy silk merchant and manufacturer who also served on the National Council (Switzerland) from 1854 to 1860. They had four children;

- Karoline Wilhelmine Streuli (born 1866), married to Caesar Stünzi (1862–1935), industrialist and partner in Baumann & Streuli, with issue. Her daughter, Elisabeth Stünzi (1893–1968), married Hans Conrad Bodmer.
- Emma Adele Streuli (born 1868), without issue.
- Marie Dora Streuli (born 1871), without issue.
- Caspar Heinrich Streuli (1880–1964), an attorney, married Elisabeth Susanna "Susi" Meisser (1875–1957), originally of Castiel in Grisons, had two daughters.

Due to his extended time in New York City from 1858 to 1861, Streuli became a naturalized U.S. citizen, and subsequently held dual citizenship.

He passed away 24 November 1915 in Horgen aged 76.

== Literature ==
- Hans Peter Treichler: Ein Seidenhändler in New York: das Tagebuch des Emil Streuli (1858–1861) NZZ (2010) (in German)
