= Heinrich Fierz =

Swiss merchant (1813–1877)

- Born: 12 September 1813; Meilen, Zurich, Switzerland
- Died: 11 June 1877 (aged 63); Fluntern, Zurich, Switzerland
- Occupations: Merchant; politician
- Spouse: Anna Katharina Locher (m. 1845)
- Father: Heinrich Fierz

Heinrich Fierz (12 September 1813 – 11 June 1877) was a Swiss merchant and liberal politician from the canton of Zurich. From 1850 he ran his own cotton trading business in Fluntern, and he was a member of the National Council from 1855 to 1874. He was the de facto economic leader of north-eastern Switzerland.

== Biography ==
Heinrich Fierz was born on 12 September 1813 in Meilen, the son of Heinrich Fierz, a farmer and district judge (Bezirksrichter). In 1845 he married Anna Katharina Locher, daughter of Bartholomäus Locher, a knitwear manufacturer.

From 1824 to 1828 Fierz attended the Hüni educational institute (Erziehungsanstalt Hüni) in Horgen, and he served a commercial apprenticeship at the Hürlimann cotton mill in Richterswil. In 1843 he founded a firm together with Heinrich Hüni. From 1850 he ran his own cotton trading business in Fluntern. He sat on the boards of railway companies and of a bank, and from 1857 to 1859 he was a director of the Kreditanstalt.

As a liberal, Fierz was a member of the Grand Council of Zurich from 1858 to 1868 and of the National Council from 1855 to 1874. He was an adviser on trade to the Federal Council, and in 1863 he was Switzerland's international trade commissioner in Paris. In 1865 Fluntern made him an honorary citizen (Ehrenbürger).

Fierz used his influence both to strengthen the economic position of Zurich and in the social field, for workers' housing, schools for people of limited means and grants for apprentices. He was the de facto economic leader of north-eastern Switzerland. He died on 11 June 1877 in Fluntern, now part of the city of Zurich.

== Bibliography ==
- A. Pfister, "J. H. Fierz, seine Gattin Nina und Gottfried Semper", in Zürcher Taschenbuch, 80, 1960, 105–166
- H. C. Peyer, "Aus den Anfängen des Indienhandels", in Zürcher Taschenbuch, 81, 1961, 107–119
- E. Gruner, Die schweizerische Bundesversammlung 1848–1920, 1, 1966, 67
