= Escher Wyss & Cie. =

Former Swiss industrial company (1805–1969)

Escher Wyss AG
- Industry: Engineering
- Founded: 1805
- Defunct: 1969
- Fate: (incorporated in Sulzer)
- Products: Naval, railway, aviation mechanics; hydraulic turbines, pumps, motors

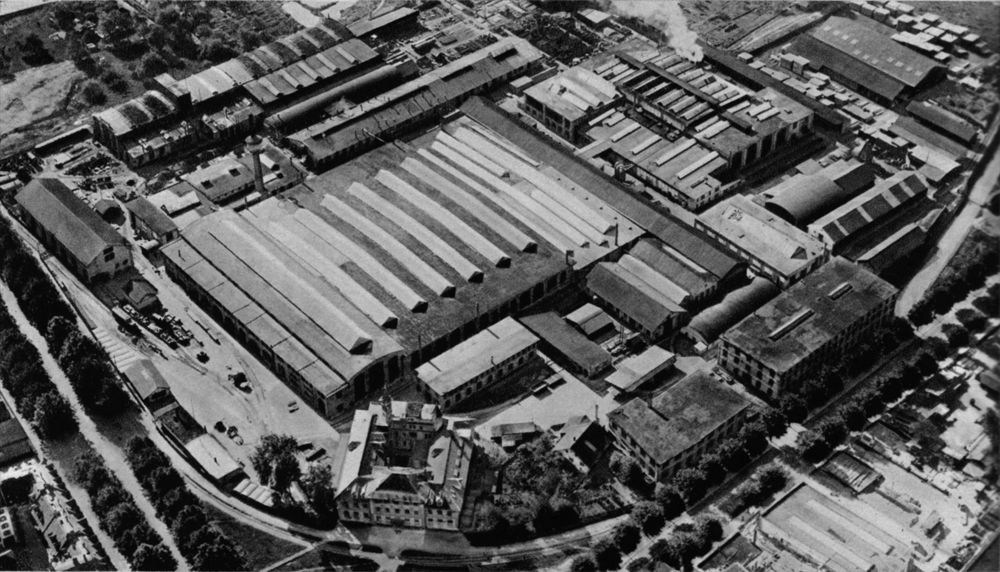
The Escher Wyss plant in Zürich in 1930

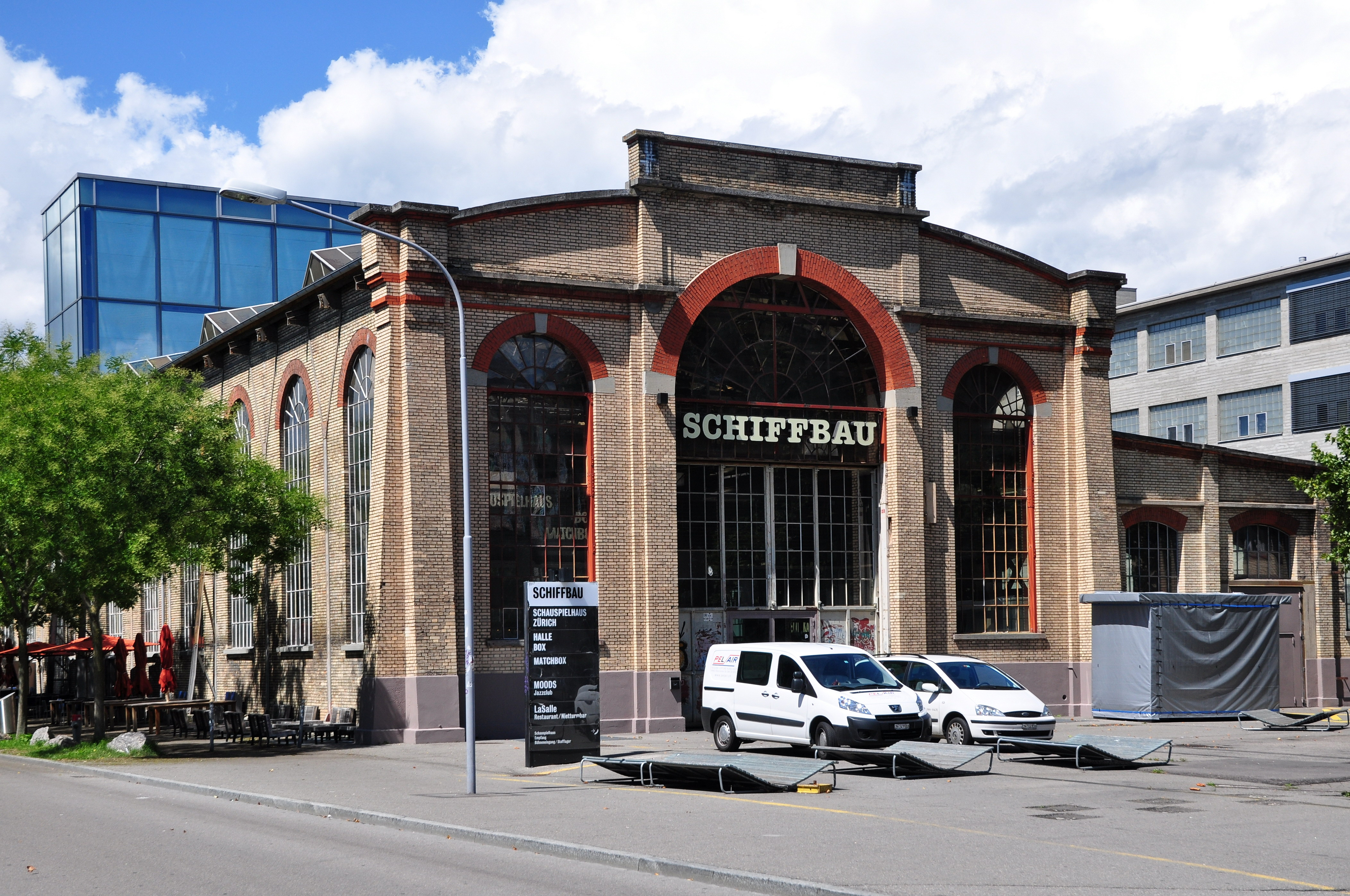
Escher Wyss's former Schiffbau or shipbuilding hall in Zürich now functions as a cultural centre.

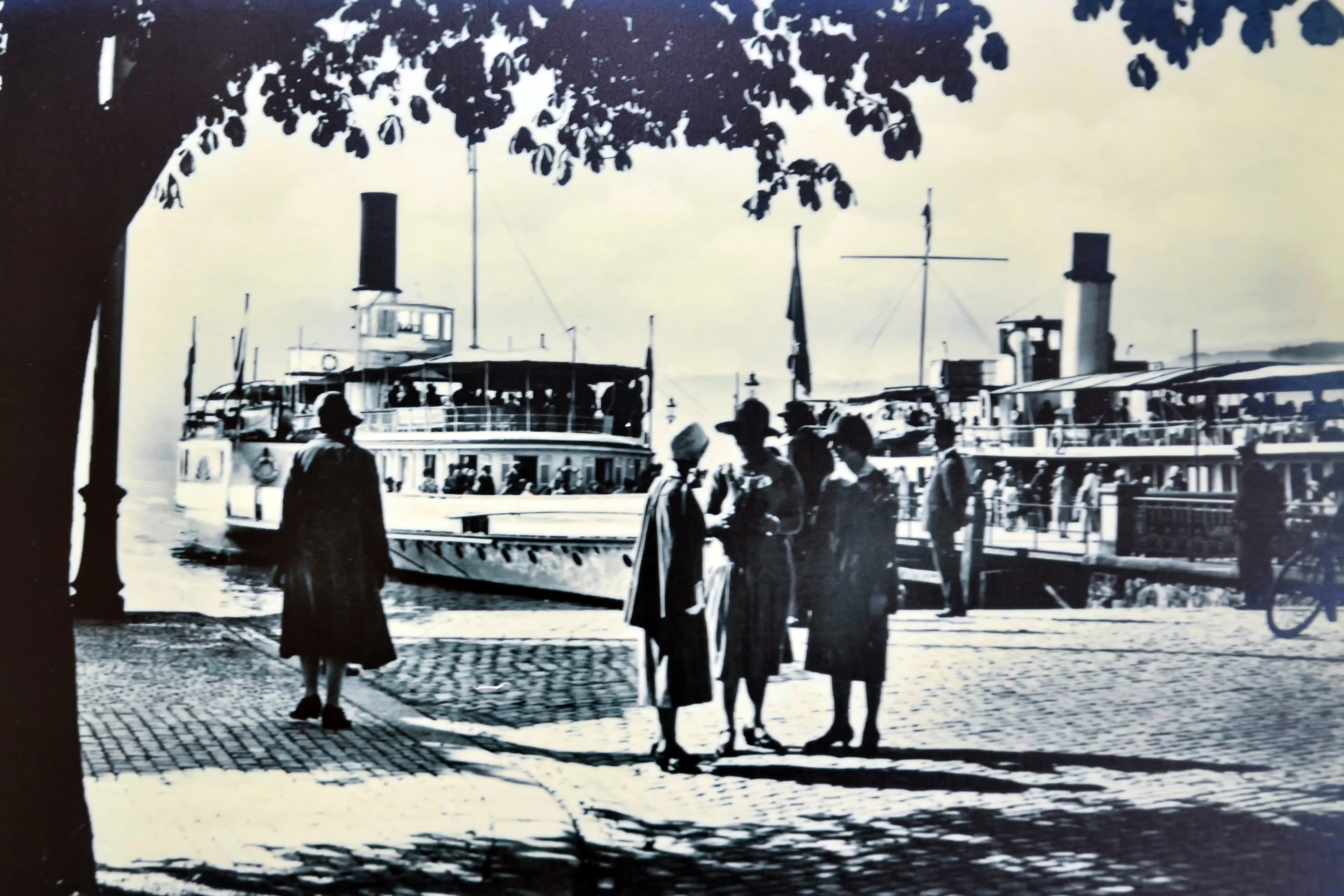
ZSG steamships Stadt Rapperswil and Stadt Zürich at Bürkliplatz respectively Bürkliterrasse.

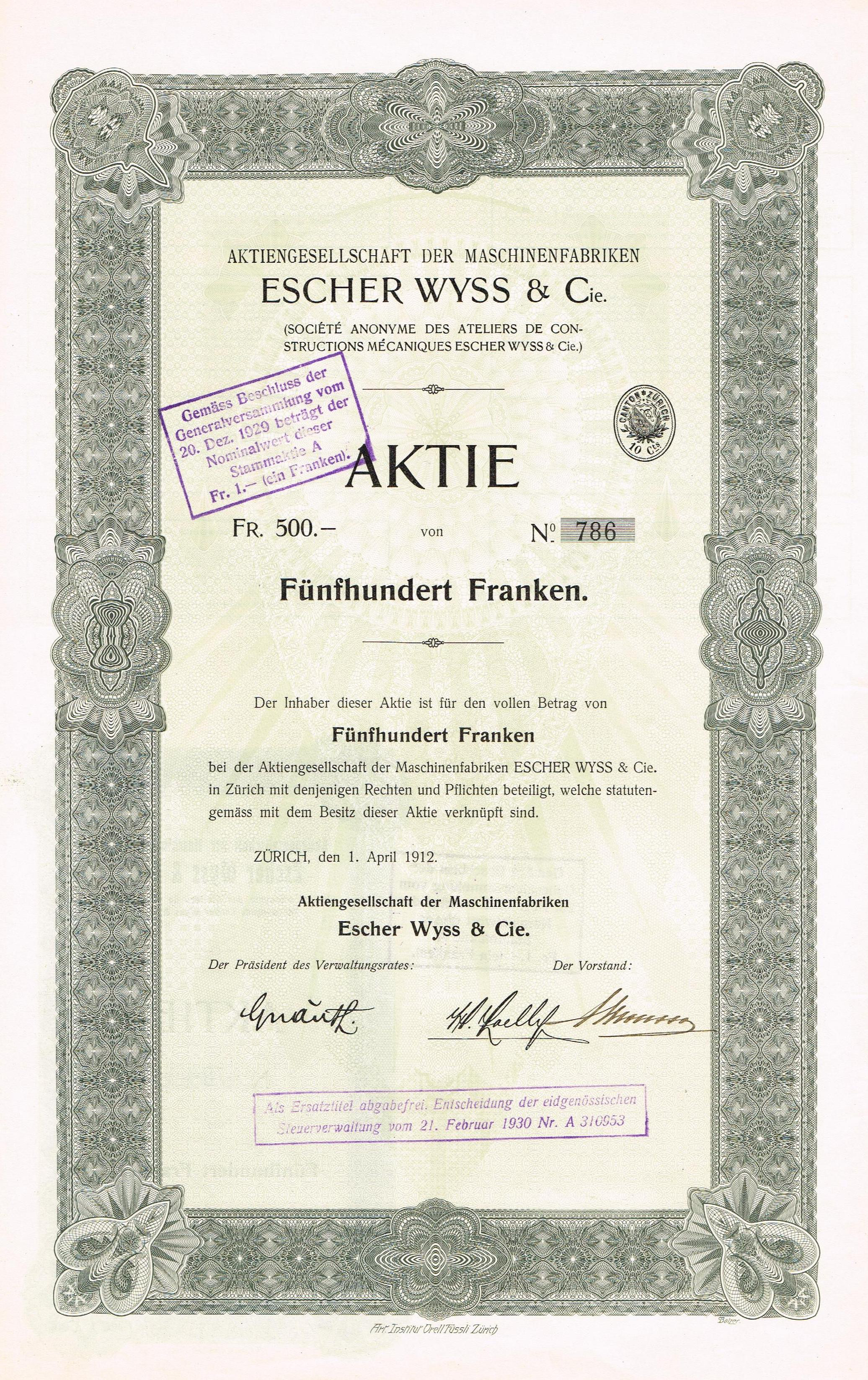
Share of the AG der Maschinenfabriken Escher Wyss & Cie, issued 1. April 1912

Escher Wyss & Cie., also known as Escher Wyss AG, was a Swiss industrial company focused on engineering and turbine construction. Its headquarters were in the Zürich quarter of Escher Wyss, which takes its name from the company.

== History ==
The company was founded, as Escher Wyss & Cie., in 1805 by Hans Caspar Escher and Salomon von Wyss. After having originally started the company as a textile spinning business, the two expanded their enterprise to include a machine shop that manufactured textile machinery, water wheels, water turbines, power transmission equipment, and starting in 1835, ships, including boilers and steam engines.

After 1860, under the direction of Hans Zoelly, the company concentrated on hydraulic systems, steam engines and cooling systems. Between 1904 and 1929 steam turbines were produced for thermal power plants, ships and locomotives. The company also manufactured hydraulic systems for hydroelectric plants. Around this time it provided equipment for Norsk Hydro. During WWII, the company was a supplier for the German war effort manufacturing and supplying flamethrowers. The company remained in existence until it was taken over in 1969 by Sulzer AG, then inside of the group Andritz AG, and was closed in 2014.

== Notable products ==
- A design of naphtha launches (1890)
- The twin Lake Zürich paddle steamers Stadt Zürich (1909) and Stadt Rapperswil (1914) built for the Dampfbootgesellschaft, both listed in the Swiss inventory of cultural property of national and regional significance as Class A objects.
- Two Lake Lucerne paddle steamers Unterwalden and Gallia (1902/1913)
- Propellers for the Hispano Aviación HA-1112

== See also ==
- Barsanti-Matteucci engine
