= Hans Caspar Escher =

Swiss industrialist and politician

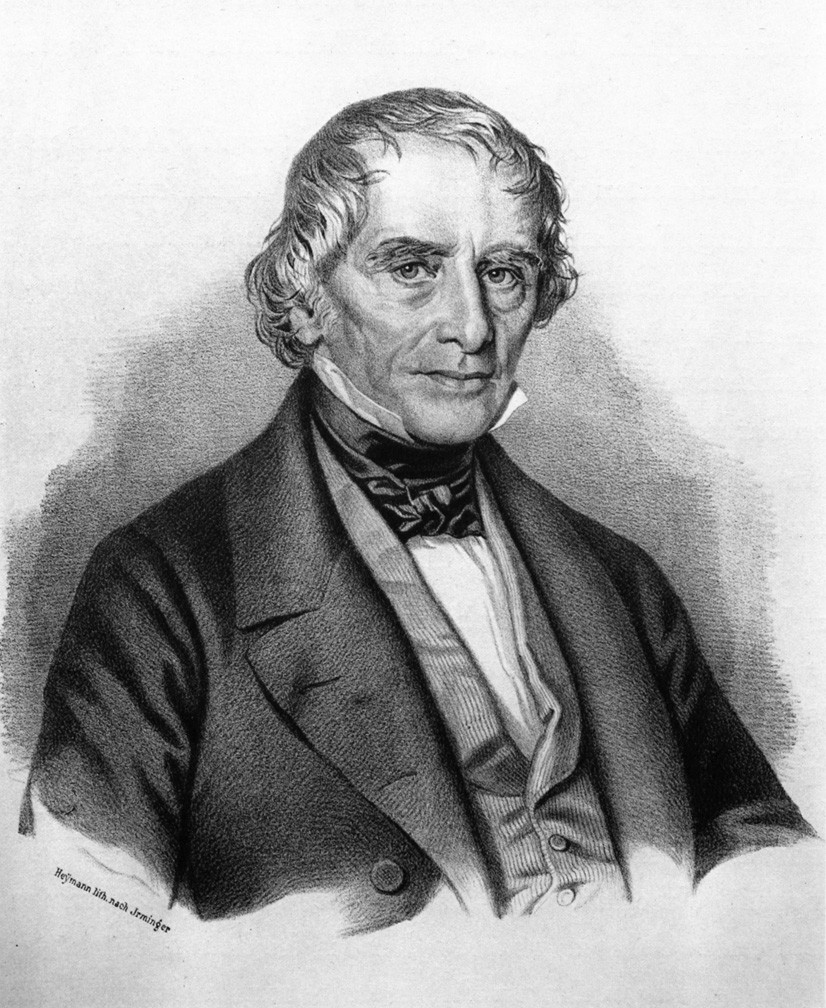
- Hans Caspar Escher. Lithograph published in 1932 in the work Zürich – Geschichte Kultur Wirtschaft.
- Born: 9 August 1775; Zurich, Switzerland
- Died: 29 August 1859 (aged 84); Herrliberg, Switzerland
- Other name: "Felsenhof"
- Education: Rome
- Occupations: Industrialist, architect, politician

Hans Caspar Escher, also known as Hans Caspar Escher de Felsenhof, (Note: After purchasing a residence in Zurich, Hans Caspar Escher acquired the nickname "Felsenhof," which is sometimes added to his surname.) born on 9 August 1775 in Zurich and died on 29 August 1859 in Herrliberg, was a Swiss industrialist, politician, and architect.

== Biography ==
=== Education and early career ===
Hans Caspar Escher was born on 9 August 1775. His father was John Caspar Escher (1754–1819), who owned a property in Herrliberg. As a teenager, he trained as a merchant at his father's wish. During a stay in Livorno, he developed an enthusiasm for architecture, which he studied in Rome from 1794 to 1797. He then returned to Zurich, where he established himself as an architect. In 1803, he began constructing a silk mill.

=== Escher-Wyss Company ===
In 1805, he founded the Escher-Wyss company with banker Salomon von Wyss. The company initially produced various types of machinery and later began manufacturing locomotives and steamships. With branches in Ravensburg and Vienna, the Escher-Wyss company became Switzerland's largest factory and one of Europe's most significant in the 19th centuryth century during Escher's lifetime. His success played a pioneering role in both social and technical domains. In addition to his roles at Escher-Wyss, Escher continued working as an architect and served as a member of the Grand Council of the Canton of Zurich until 1830.

== Family ==
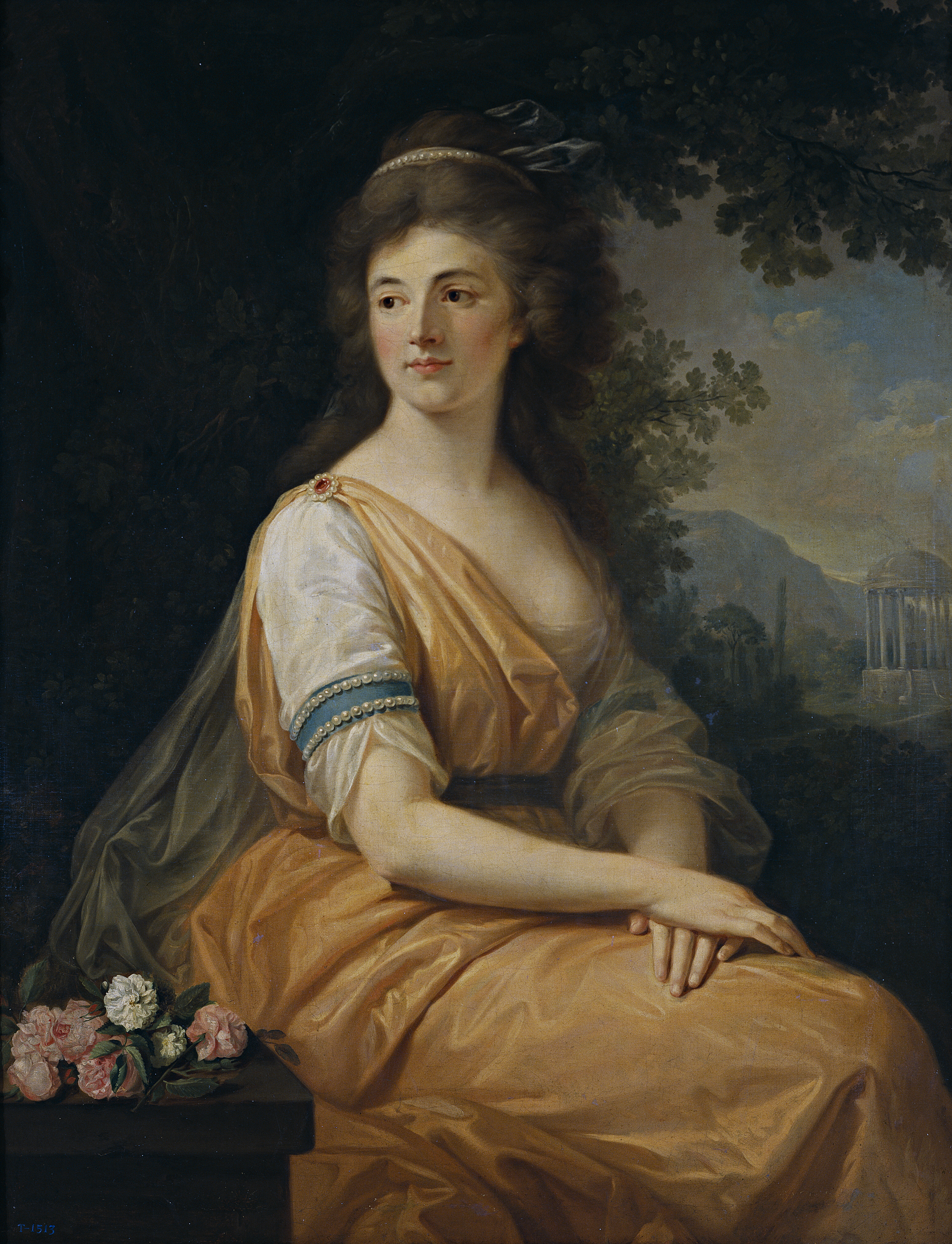
Angelica Kauffmann, circa 1800 in the Museo del Prado, Madrid.

Escher married Anna von Muralt in 1806; his only son, Albert Escher, died before him in 1845.

== Bibliography ==
- Historisch-Biographisches Lexikon der Schweiz [Historical-Biographical Lexicon of Switzerland] (in German). Vol. 3. 1926.
- Haefelin, Jürg (1989). Hans Caspar Escher: Architekt und Gründer der « Escher, Wyss & Co. », Bauten und Projekte in Zürich [Hans Caspar Escher: Architect and Founder of «Escher, Wyss & Co.», Buildings and Projects in Zurich] (in German). Zurich.
- Mousson, Albert (1868). Lebensbild von Johann Caspar Escher im Felsenhof [Biography of Johann Caspar Escher at Felsenhof] (in German). Zurich.
- Peter, Charlotte (1956). Hans Caspar Escher, 1775–1859 – François-Louis Cailler, 1796–1852 - Salomon Volkart, 1816–1893 – Franz Josef Bucher-Durrer, 1834–1906 (in German). Zurich: Verein für Wirtschaftshistorische Studien.
- Carl, Bruno (20 March 2006). "Escher, Hans Caspar (vom Glas)". Dictionnaire Historique de la Suisse (in French). 19847.
