= ESZ CFe 4/4 =

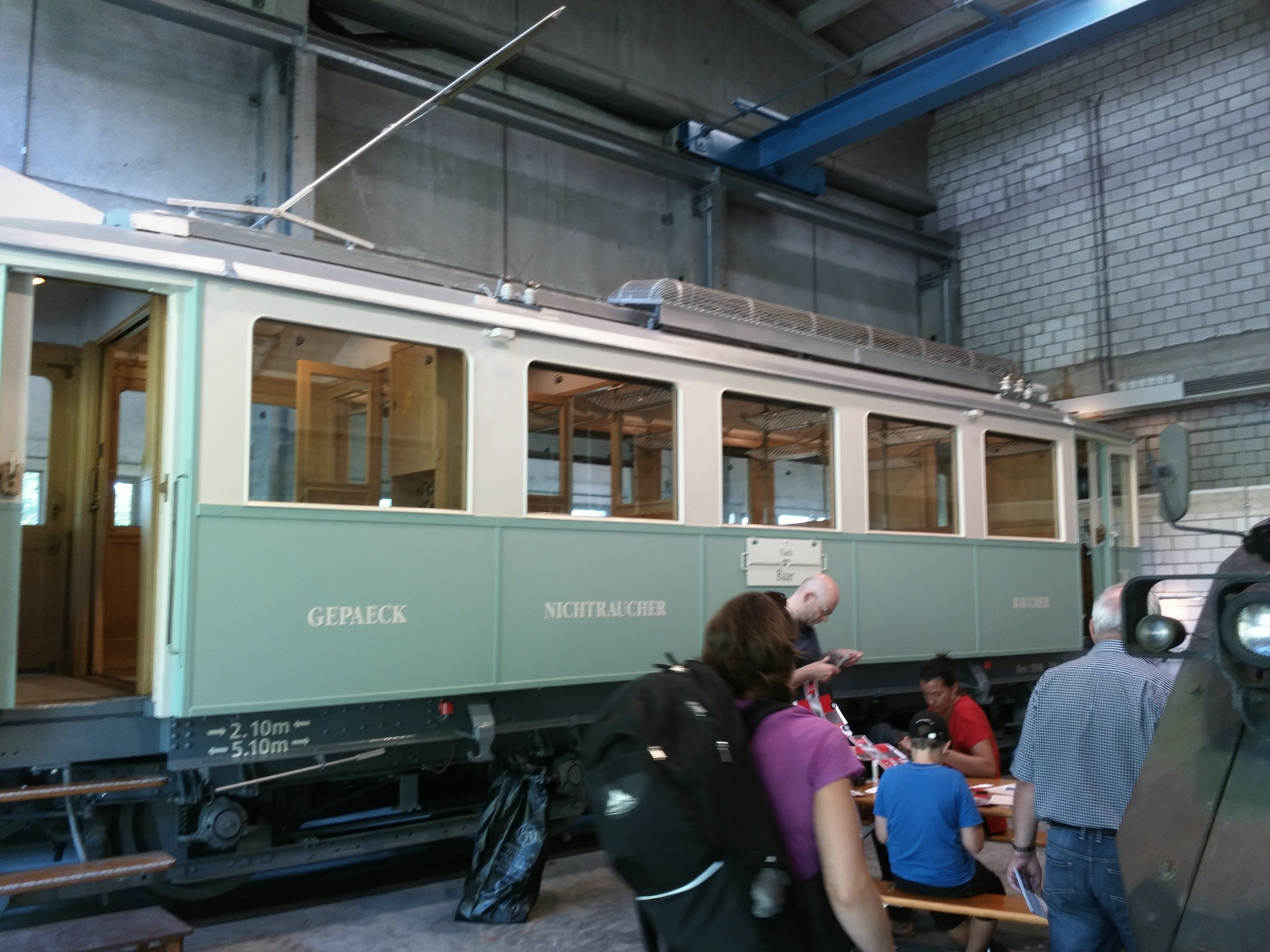
CFe 4/4 of the Elektrische Strassenbahnen im Kanton Zug (ESZ)

CFe 4/4 was the designation of the electric railcar of the Elektrische Strassenbahnen im Kanton Zug (ESZ) (English: Electric Tramways of the Canton of Zug), build by the Maschinenfabrik Oerlikon and delivered from 1913 onwards. One of the CFe 4/4 of the ESZ had the nickname "elephant".

== History and development ==
The company Electric Tramways of the Canton of Zug (ESZ) opened on 9 September 1913 the overland tramway track Zug–Oberägeri, Zug–Baar–Thalacker and Nidfurren–Menzingen. On all routes, in the first years, the motor vehicles CFe 4/4 ran as solo coaches and replaced the motor bus, because the previously used nine-pound Orion Autobuses were not reliable and were not comfortable with their solid rubber wheels on the unpaved road.

These were driven solo or, as from on 1920, with railroad cars of the type ESZ Personenwagen C 36 – C 38. Closed and open goods wagons were used for freight transport.

Three CFe 4/4 were purchased as passenger railcars (Nos. 1, 2 and 4). The CFe 4/4 with the number 3 was procured as a goods railcar with the designation Fe 4/4 and the ESZ number 21.

The name "elephant" comes from the grey paint, which the third CFe 4/4 initially had. This was converted to passenger railcar in 1916 as a result of the need for more transport capacity for passengers. The tram service on these routes was put to an end in 1953 and were replaced by buses. The four CFe 4/4 of the ESZ were sold to the Wynental- and Suhrentalbahn WSB (Wynental and Suhrental Railway), Langenthal-Jura-Bahn (LJB) and Oberaargau-Jura-Bahnen (OJB).

After the end of the electric tramways in the canton of Zug, all vehicles were sold. Today the passenger railcar C-37 is still in possession of the Jagsttalbahn, an ESZ CFe 4/4 was brought again from Langenthal to Neuheim and restored in the original colours. This ESZ CFe 4/4 is now located in the Zug depot technology history (German: Zuger Depot Technikgeschichte).

== Technical specifications ==
- Numbering: 1-4
- Number: 4
- Manufacturer: Maschinenfabrik Oerlikon
- Year of construction: 1913/1921/1926
- End of service by the ESZ: 1953
- Wheel arrangement: 4/4
- Track gauge: 1435 mm (Standard gauge)
- Length over buffers: 20'600 mm
- Service weight: 21 t
- Maximum speed: 30 km/h
- Hourly power: 512 kW (696 hp)
- Power system: 15 kV 16.7 Hz
- Power transmission: pantograph
- Number of motors: 4
- Seating: 53

== Pictures ==
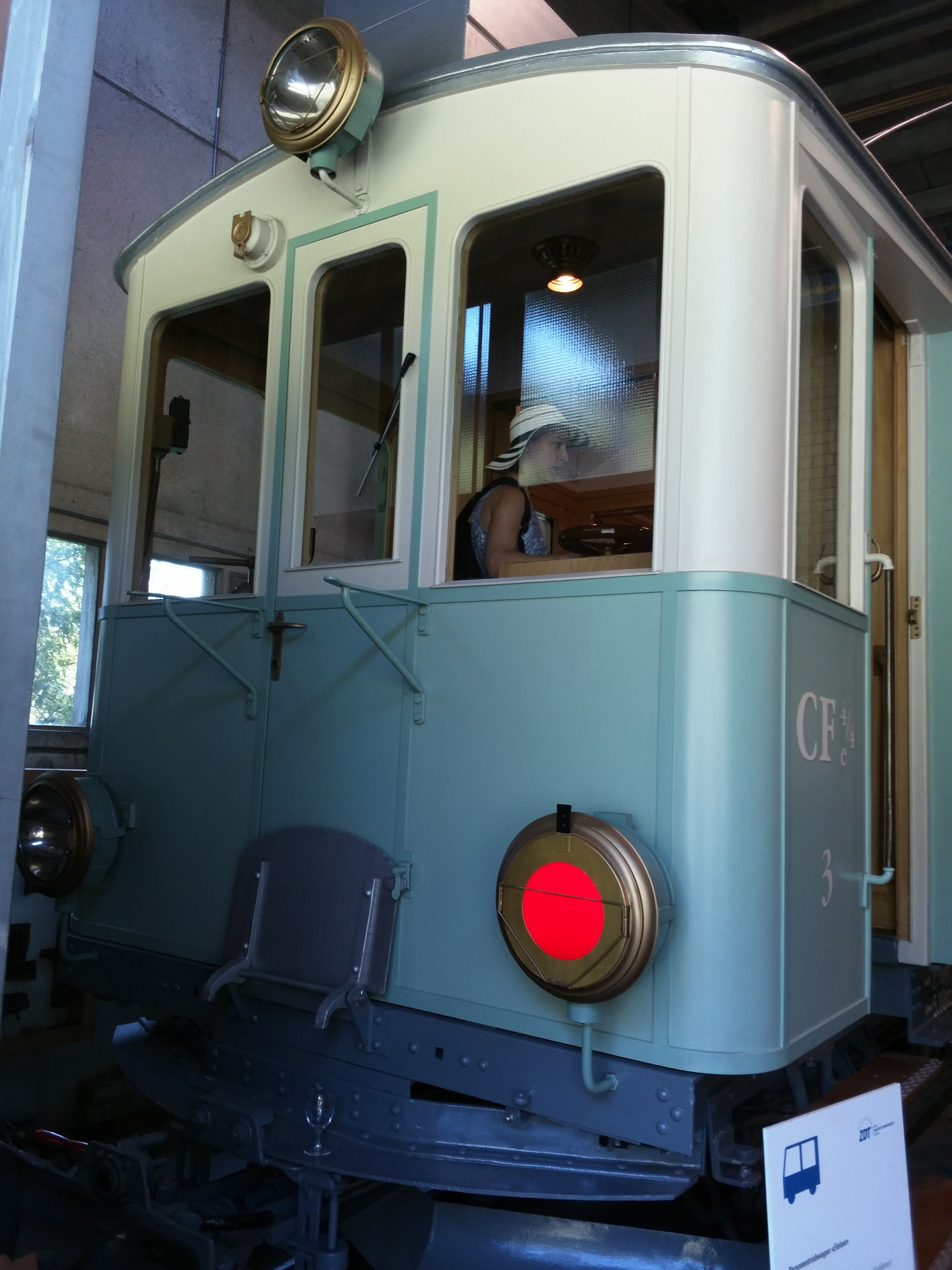
CFe 4/4 Front

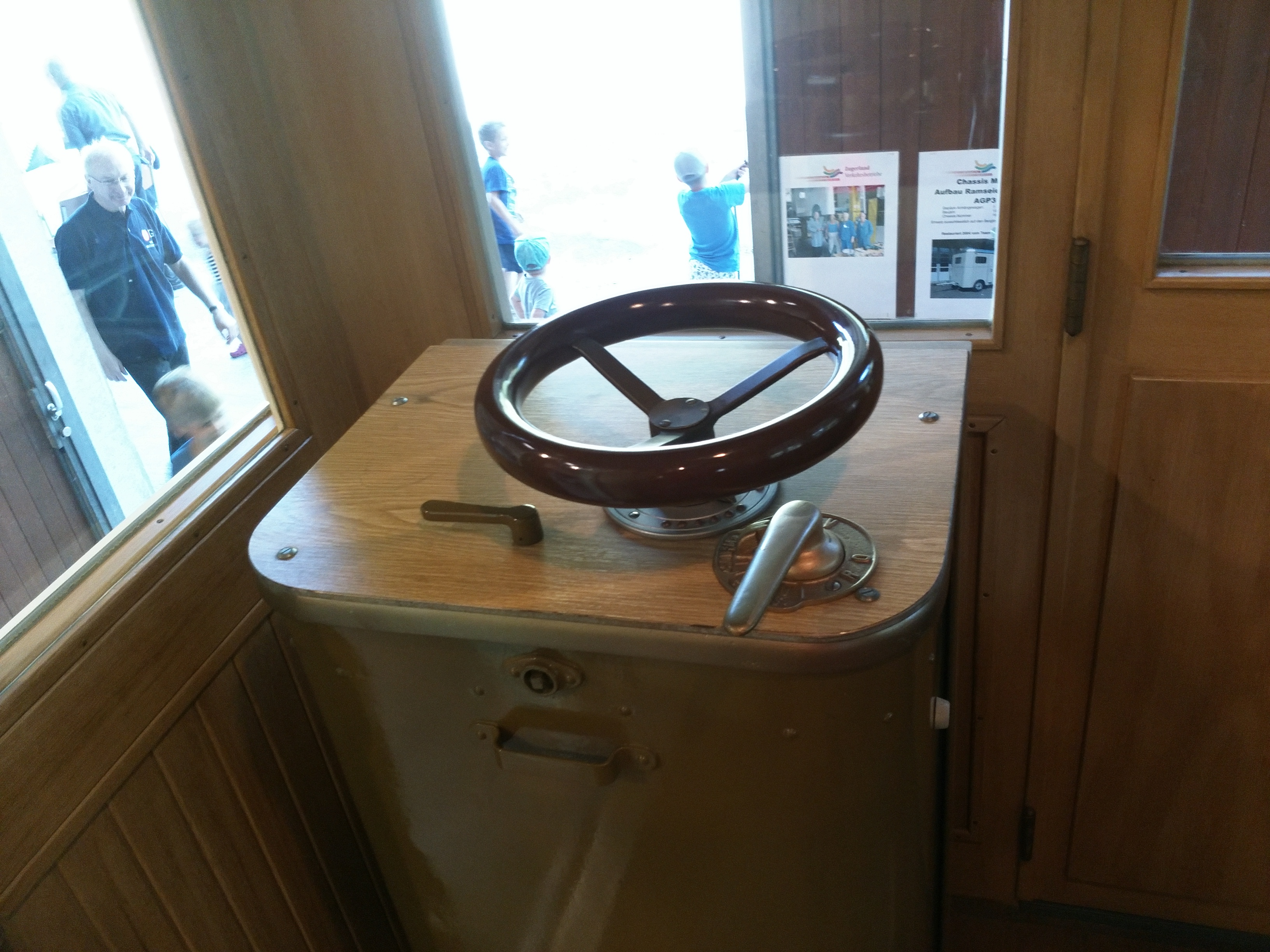
Cockpit left-hand side

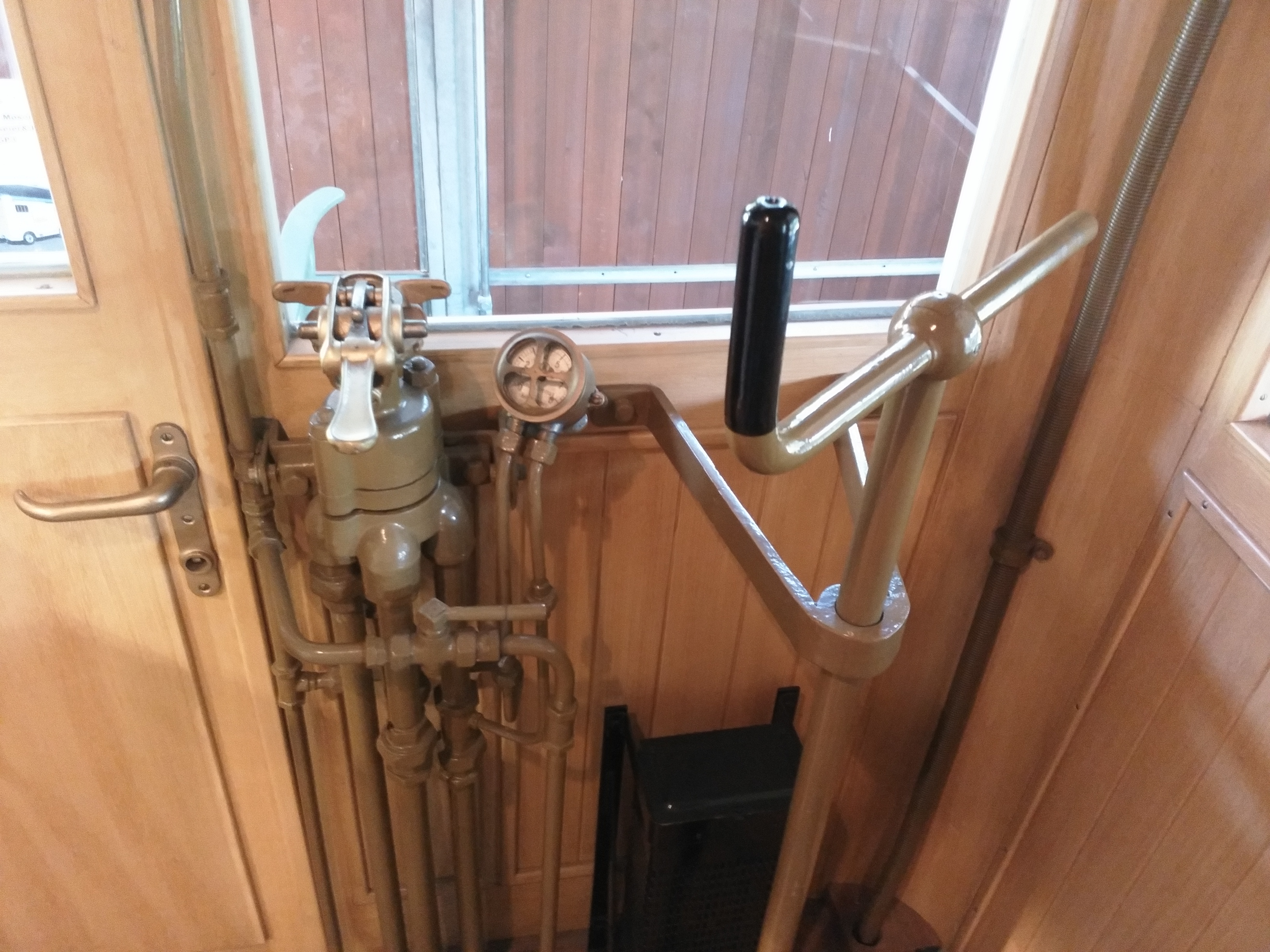
Cockpit right-hand side

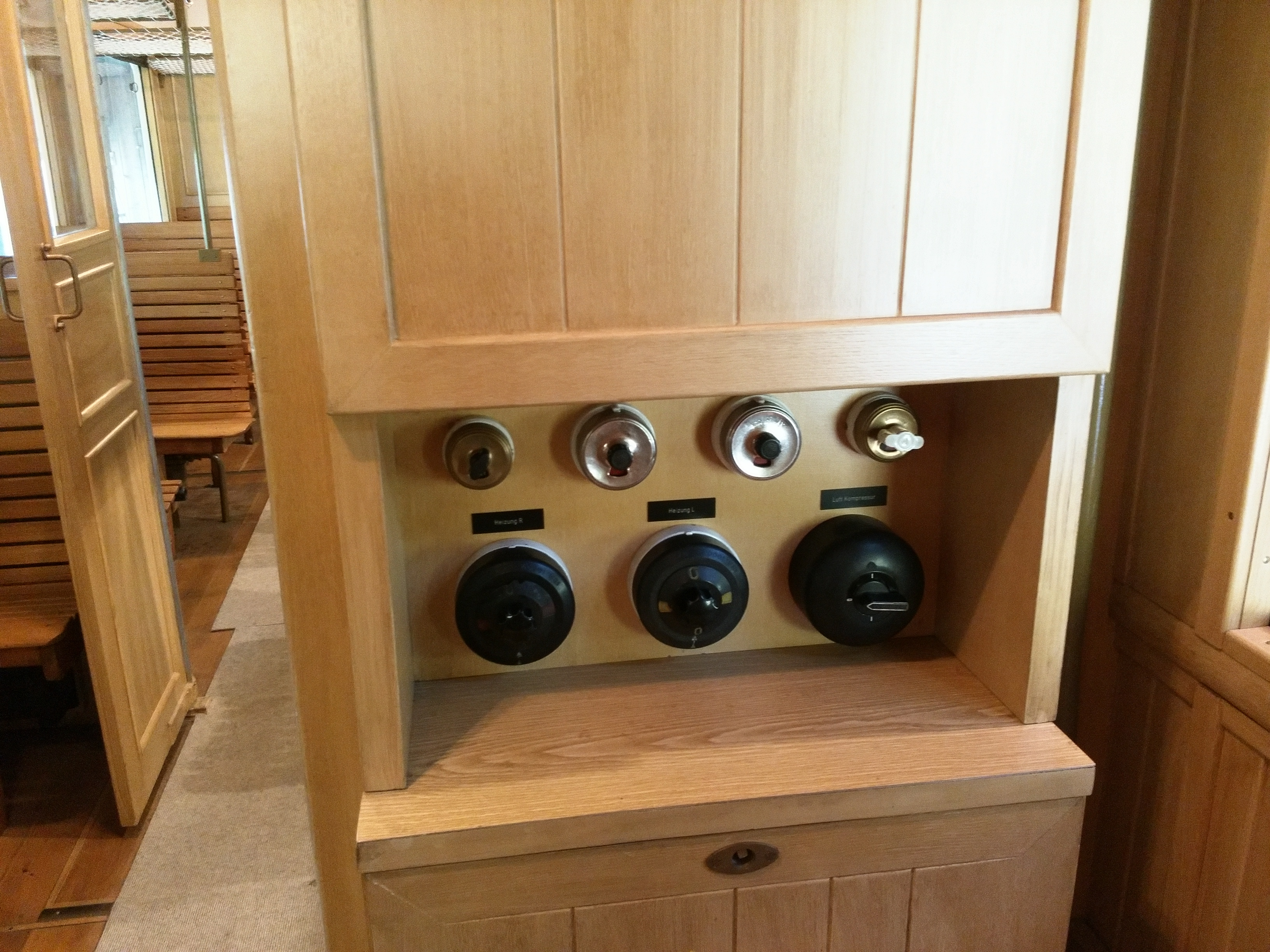
Heater

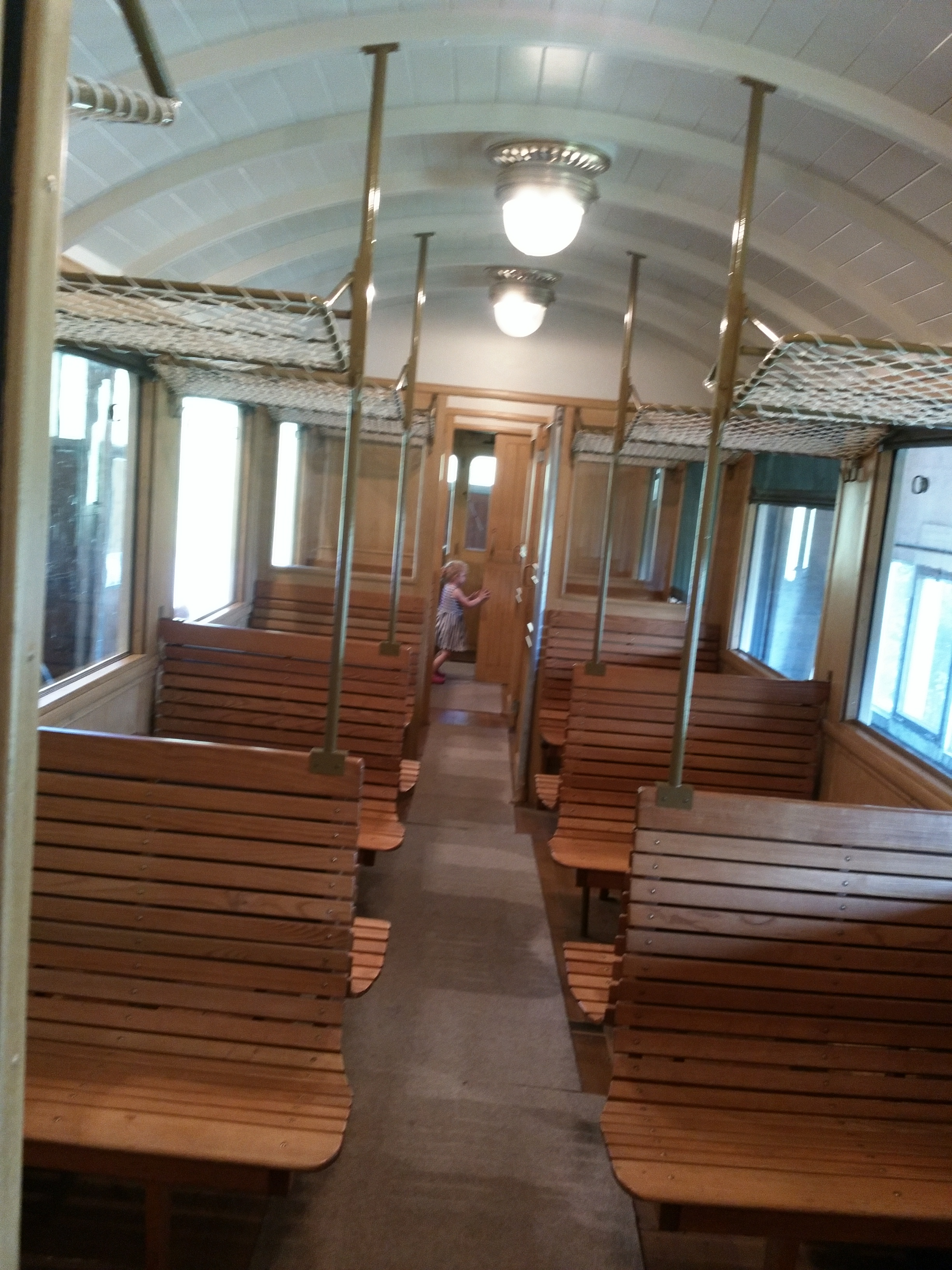
Passenger cabin

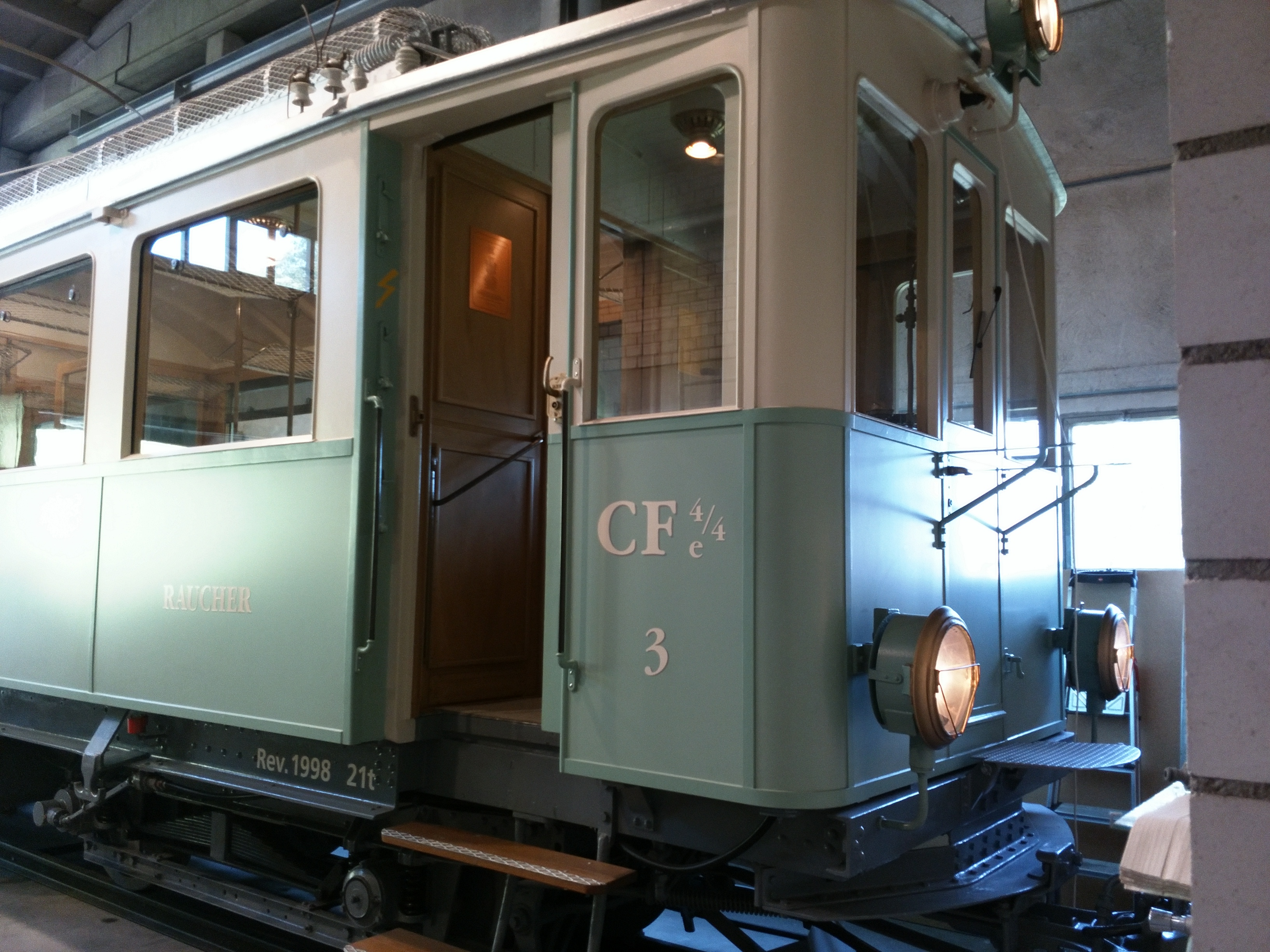
End
