= ESZ Personenwagen C 36 – C 38 =

Swiss train cars

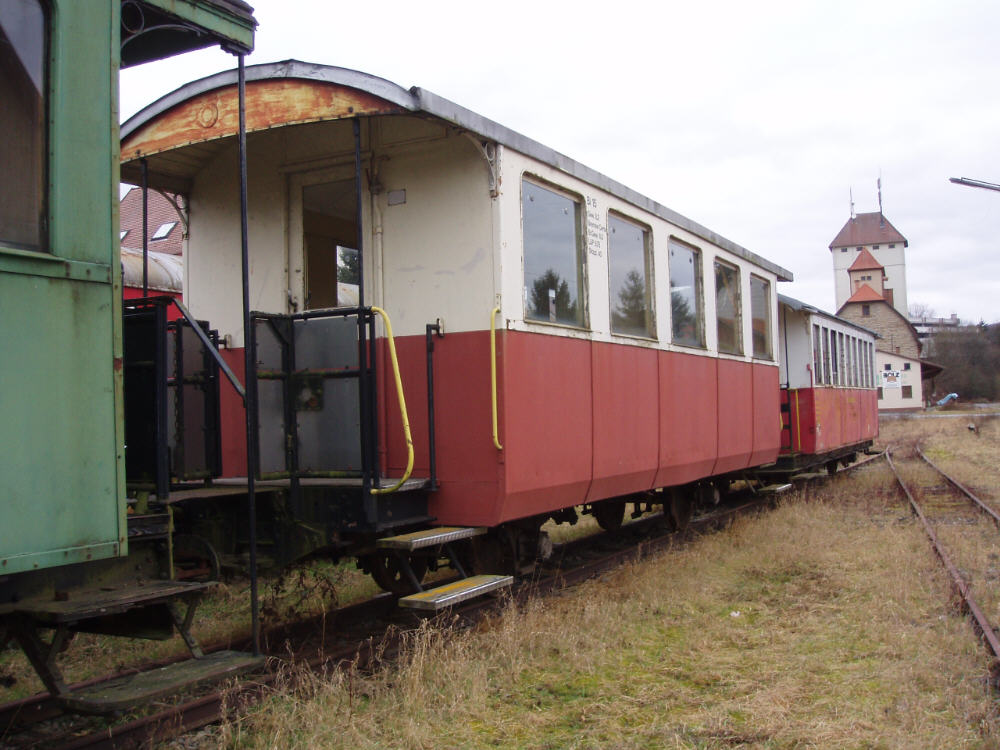
ESZ passenger coach of the Jagsttalbahn

ESZ Personenwagen C 36 – C 38 (Passenger coaches C 36 - C 38) was the name of three two-axle passenger cars of the electric trams in the canton of Zug (ESZ).

== History and development ==
The company Electric Railways in the Canton of Zug (ESZ) opened on 9 September 1913 the overland tramway track Zug - Oberägeri, Zug - Baar -Thalacker and Nidfurren-Menzingen. On all routes, In the first years, the motor vehicles CFe 4/4 drove off as solo coaches and replaced the automobile bus, because the previously used nine-pound Orion Autobuses were not reliable and were not comfortable with their solid rubber wheels on the unpaved road.

The ESZ ordered the two two-axle passenger cars C 36 and C 37 in 1919 by SWS Schlieren. These were put into operation on March 31, 1920. The third car, C 38, entered service in 1926.

The tram service on these routes was discontinued in 1953 and replaced by Saurer 5 DUK buses. In 1955, the three wagons were sold to the Sernftal tramway in Canton Glarus. In 1969 this train was also replaced by buses. The coach C-38 was scrapped after 1986. The other two were taken over by the social club Eurovapor and brought to Solothurn. Until 1981 the wagons were unused on the tracks of Solothurn-Zollikofen-Bern-Bahn and Bern-Worb-Bahnen. C-36 was scrapped at the beginning of the 1970s. The remaining coach C-37 was sold to the Jagsttalbahn in Germany. In 1983/1984 he was revised and equipped with wheel sets for 750 millimetres (30 in) Track gauge. The Jagsttalbahn has been shut down since some time and the continuation is uncertain. This also affects the fate of the former ESZ passenger coach.

== Data ==
- Numbering: C 36 - C 38
- Numbers Built: 3
- Manufacturer:SWS Schlieren
- Year of construction: 1919
- Out of service: 1984
- Track width: 1435 mm (Standard gauge)
- Length over coupling: 9.7 m
- Width: 2,5 m
- Bogie stand: 4.4 m
- Empty weight: 7.2 t
- Seats: 40
