= Hirzel Pass =

Mountain pass in the Swiss Alps

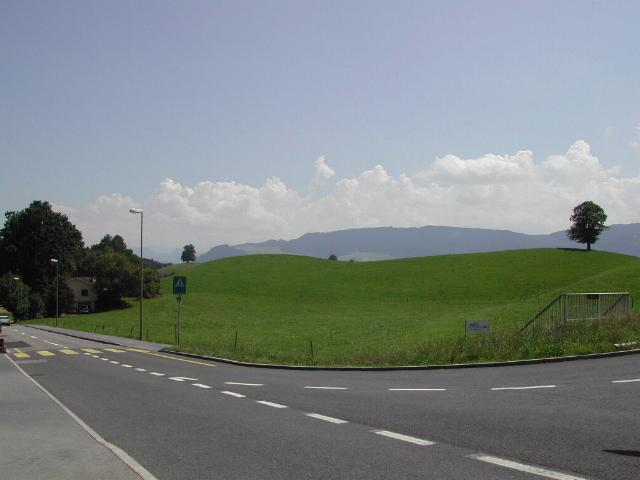
- Hirzel Pass

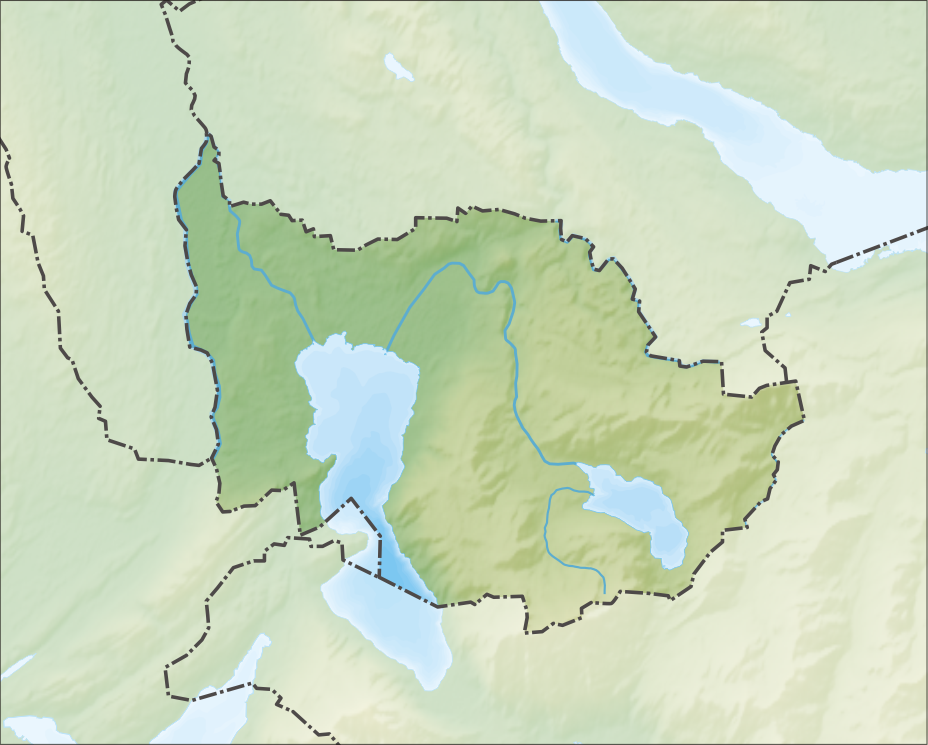
- Location within Canton of Zürich Location within Canton of Zug Location within Switzerland Location within Alps
- Interactive map of Hirzel Pass
- Elevation: 672 metres (2,205 ft)

Third Approach
- Location: Switzerland
- Range: Alps
- Coordinates: 47°12′53″N 8°36′41″E

Hirzel Pass, elevation 672 metres (2,205 ft), is a mountain pass in the Alps between the cantons of Zürich and Zug in Switzerland. It connects Wädenswil and Sihlbrugg, and the summit is in the municipality of Hirzel.
