= Wellenberg Tower =

Part of the Zurich fortifications

Coordinates: 47°22′7.5″N 8°32′33.5″E

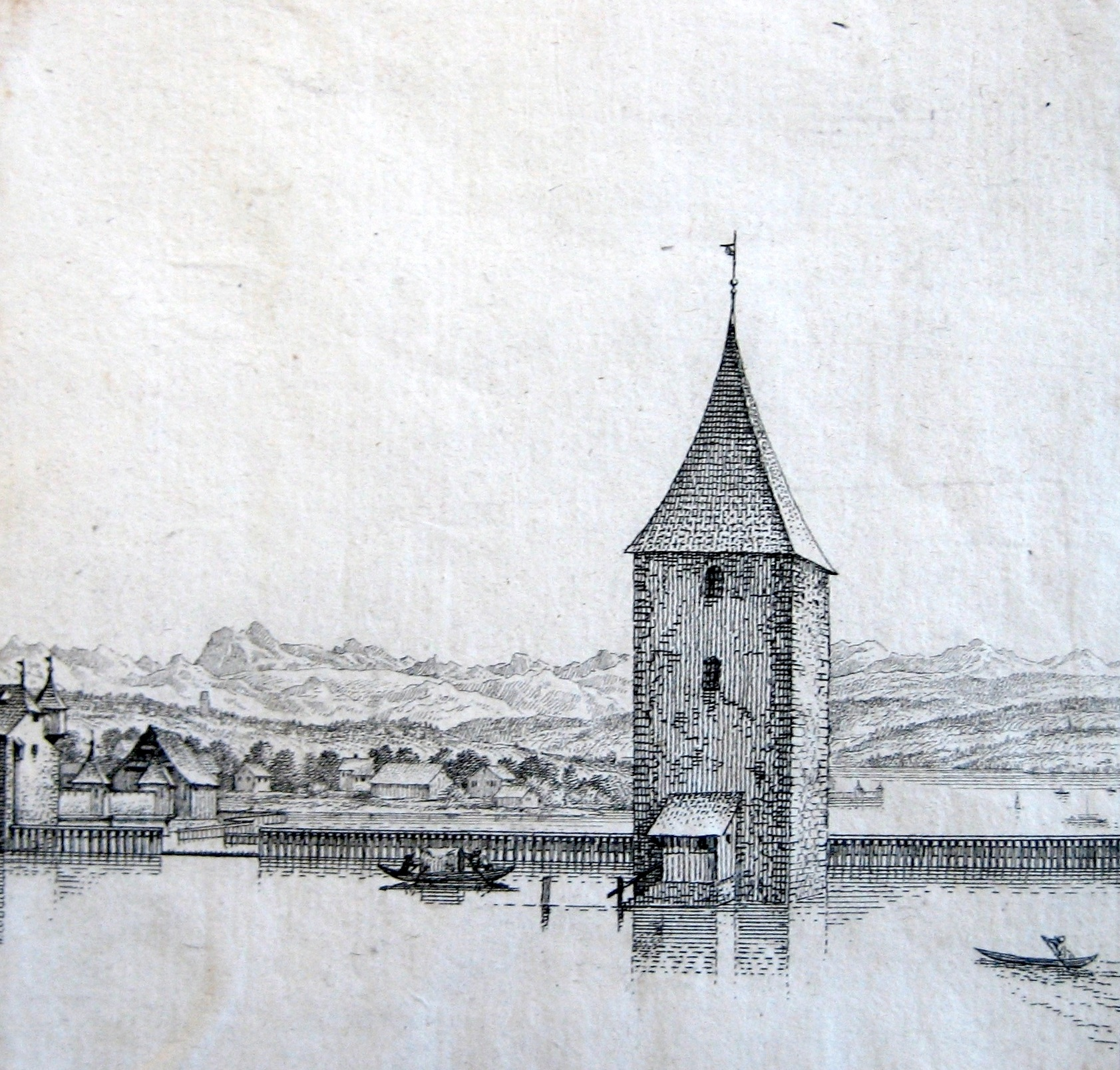
The Wellenberg tower from the north, as depicted in an engraving by Johann Balthasar Bullinger, 1770.

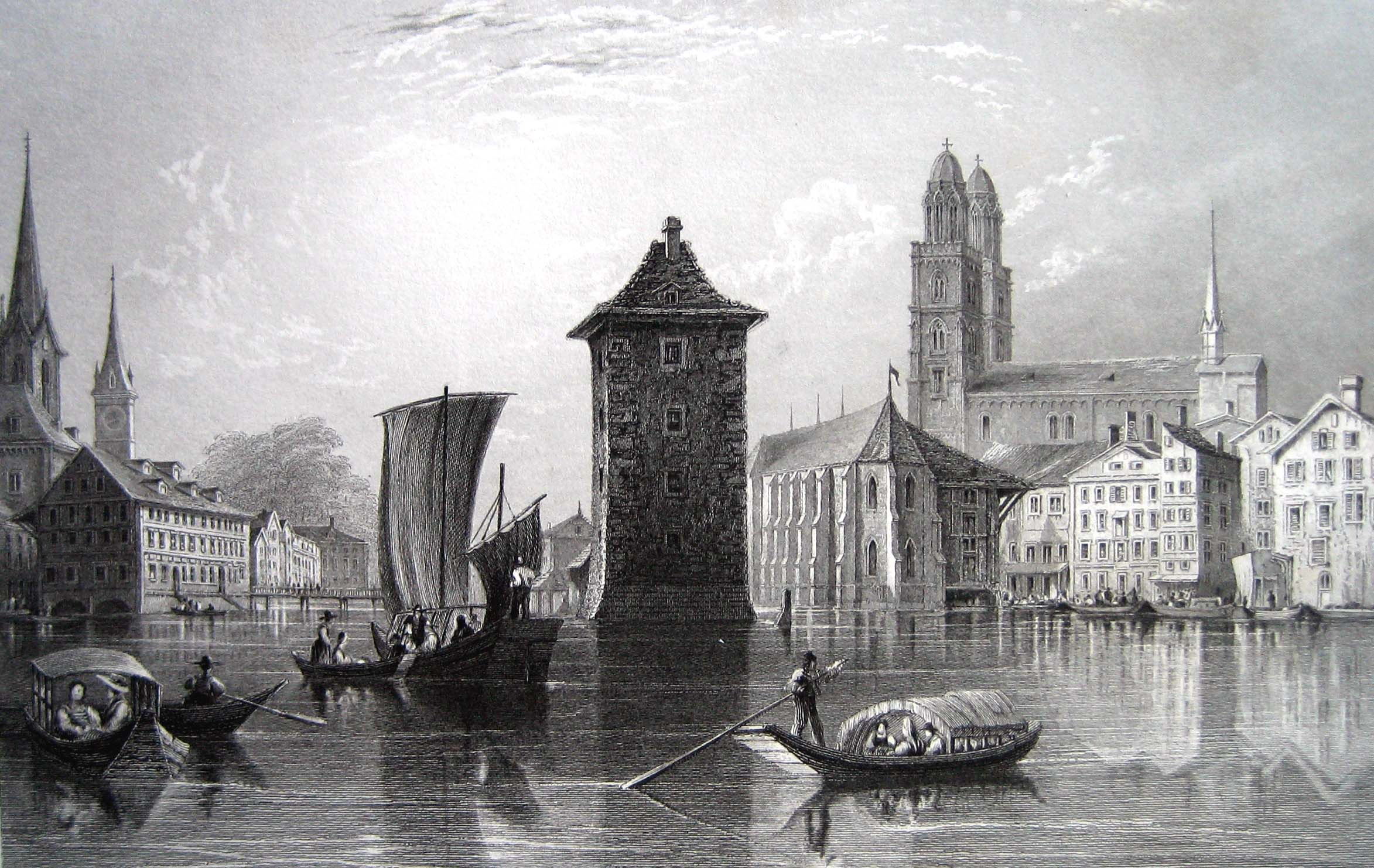
The Wellenberg tower from the south, as depicted in an engraving by W. Bartlett, circa 1834.

The Wellenberg Tower was possibly part of the early city fortifications of Zurich. It stood between today's Münster Bridge and the Quaibrücke at the height of Schifflände Square on the Limmat and was only accessible by boat.

== History ==
Written evidence of the construction of the massive tower is lacking. Johann Jacob Wagner of Wellenberg wrote in the Mercurius Helveticus, which was published between 1684 and 1701:

“… the Water Tower, now called the Wellenberg, which serves as a prison… It was a lighthouse (pharos), such a tower on which a great light was placed to guide seafarers at night.”

However, this statement has no historical basis. The tower was likely built in connection with the first city fortifications in the second half of the 13th century to secure the upper Limmat area.

The name Wellenberg is thought to derive either from an original owner, Knight Wello or the first prominent prisoner, Ulrich of Wellenberg. He had lived at Wellenberg Castle above Felben-Wellhausen and engaged in Robber baron activities. In revenge for repeated attacks on Zurich merchants, the castle was stormed and burned down in 1258 by a Zurich assault team on the orders of Rudolf I of Habsburg. Ulrich of Wellenberg and his two nephews were captured, taken to Zurich, and imprisoned in the Wellenberg Tower until they took the Urfehde (a form of oath).

The tower's function as a prison is first mentioned in the Richtebrief of 1304, in which the then Zurich city scribe Nikolaus Mangold compiled the city's most important laws.

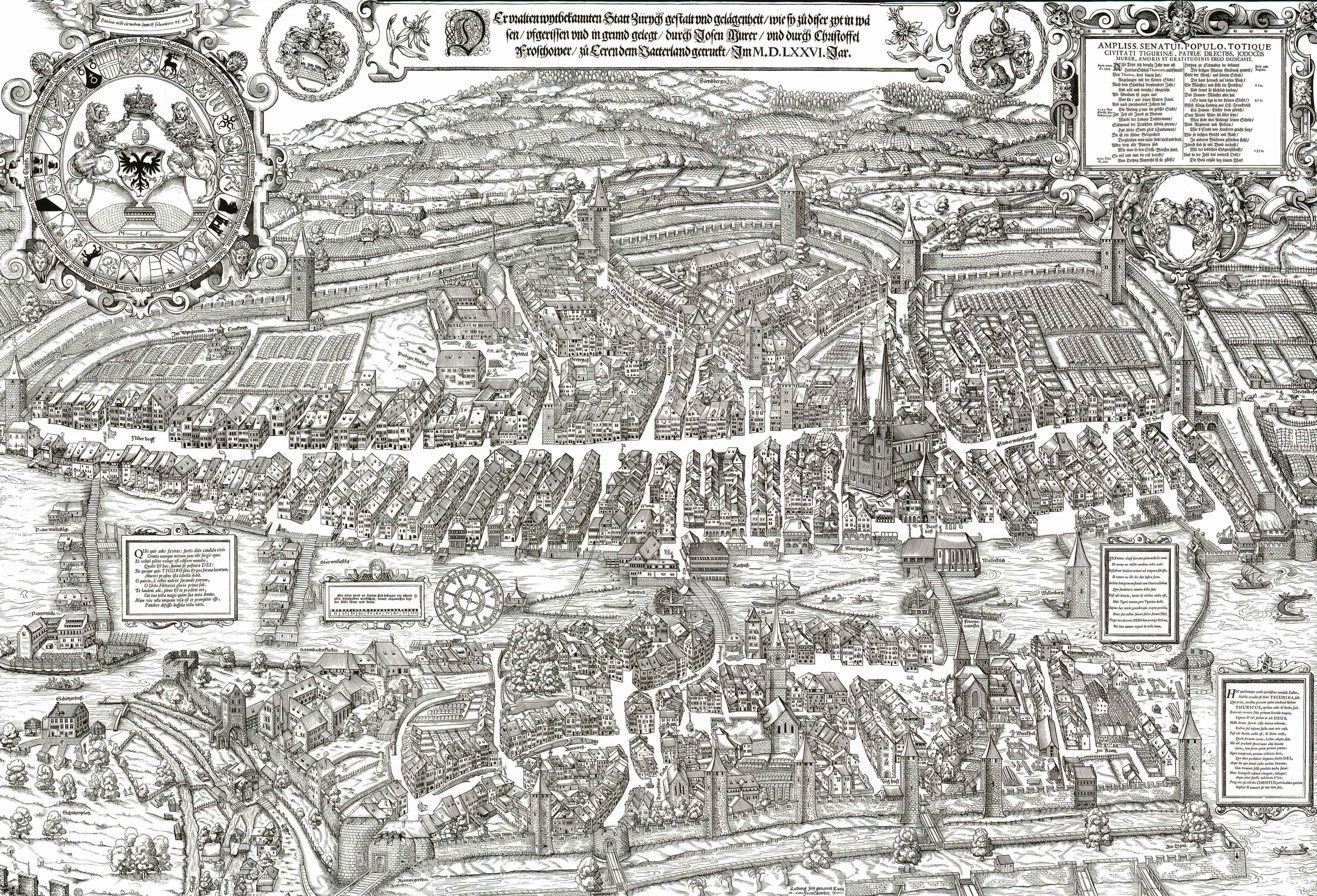
The *Murer Plan* of 1576, showing the Wellenberg Tower on the right side of the Limmat River

In 1536, the tower seems to have been extensively renovated. In 1778, an annex with two interrogation rooms was added on the north side. During the French occupation of Zurich from 1789 to 1799, the tower served as a prison for disciplinary punishments. In 1799, it was largely destroyed by fire caused by the carelessness of some prisoners. It remained in ruins for several years until it was roofed and repaired in 1804. The extensive remodeling of the Oetenbach Monastery into a cantonal prison between 1830 and 1834

Before its demolition, the Wellenberg was open for visits. Stones from the tower were used in the construction of the quay facilities and the Münster Bridge, which was inaugurated on August 20, 1838. A fireworks display was held on the remaining foundations of the Wellenberg. The tower was documented before its demolition by David Nüscheler and Franz Hegi.

== Architecture ==
According to various depictions before 1800, the tower contained three floors with nine prison cells, including two "vaults" on the ground floor and a "blockhouse" in the attic; it was covered with a sharp pyramidal roof. In the early 19th century, two rooms were heated. Images taken after the 1803 fire show it with four floors and a flatter hipped roof.

The Winterthur Hausfreund from 1840 states the tower's height was 50 feet (15 meters). Its length and width were each 30 feet (9 meters). The wall thickness tapered upwards from a substantial 8 feet (2.4 m) to 5 feet (1.5 m) under the roof. Up to a height of 8 feet (2.5 meters), the tower was made of solid ashlar stones, while above that, rubble stones were used. The roof was covered with wooden shingles.

According to the Hausfreund, prisoners in the vaults on the ground floor could barely stand. They were fed only water and bread, while those in the upper rooms received two to three warm meals a day. The small wooden cage in the attic, which was also used to house rebellious prisoners, was rarely used. A lift was used to raise goods to the upper floors. A large wooden post in the ground floor allowed prisoners to be tied to it. "Nothing was spared to ensure both the safety and health of the prisoners," writes the Hausfreund.

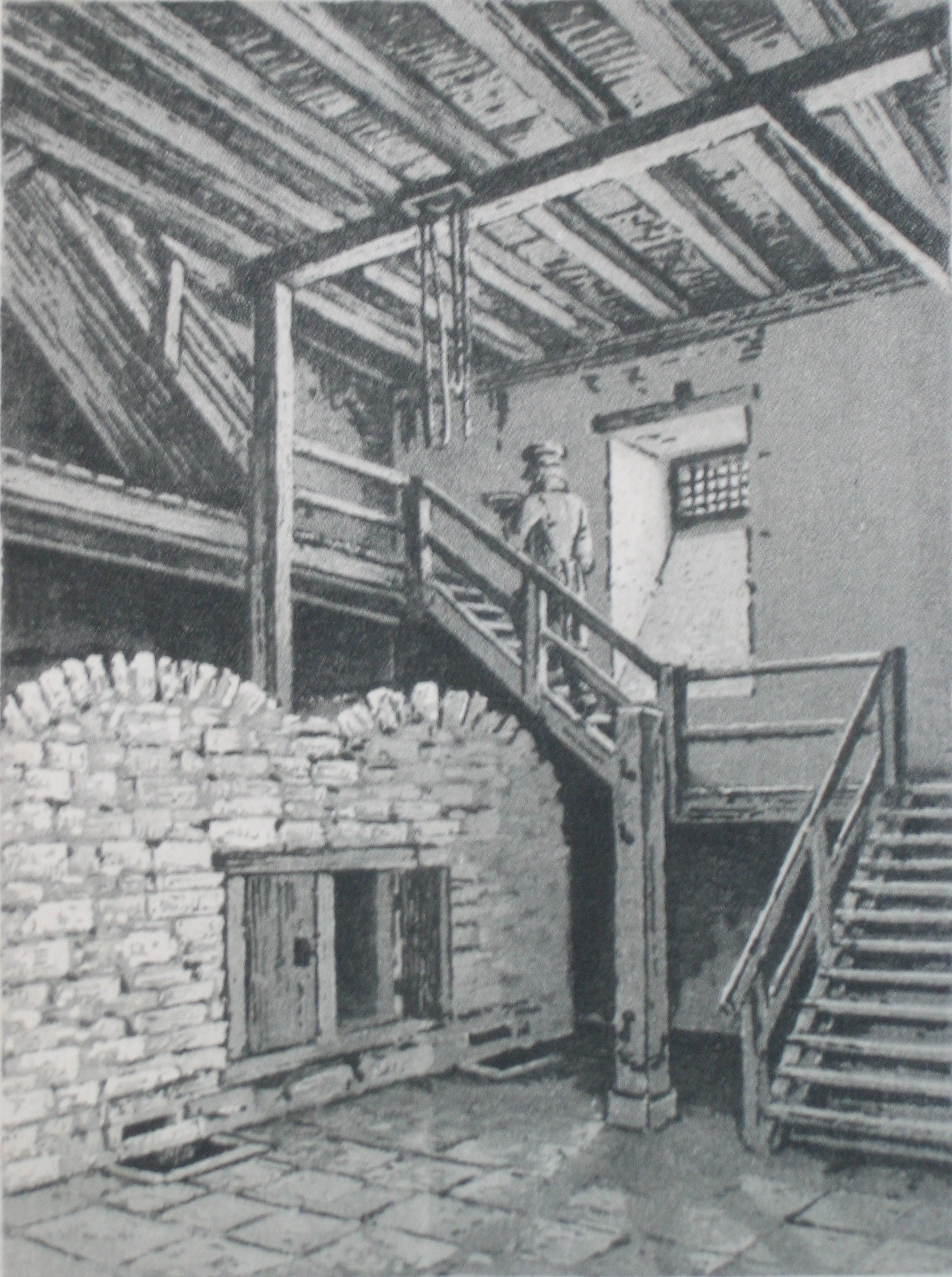
Lower cells, post, with the goods lift visible above

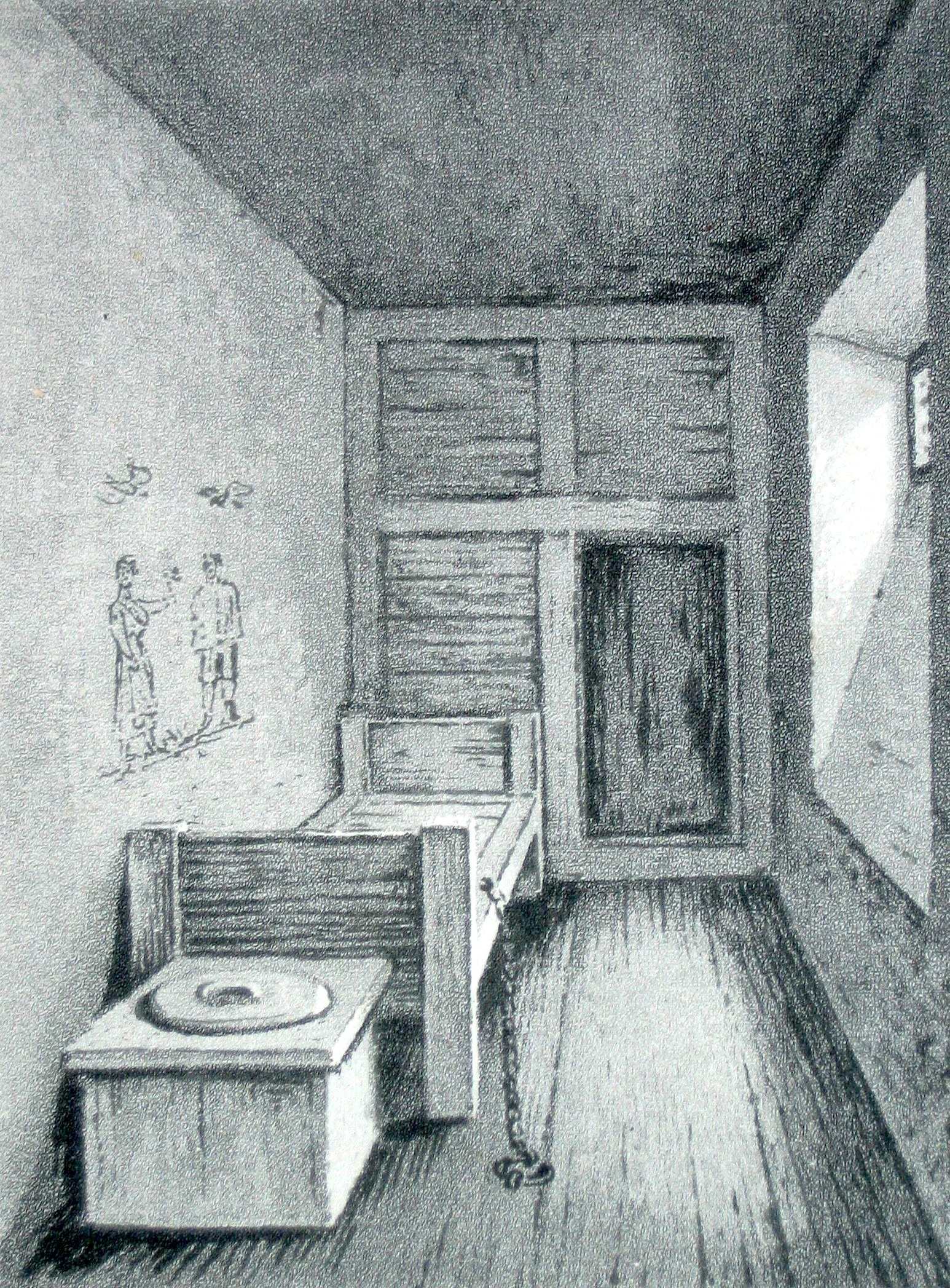
One of the better cells with a bed and latrine

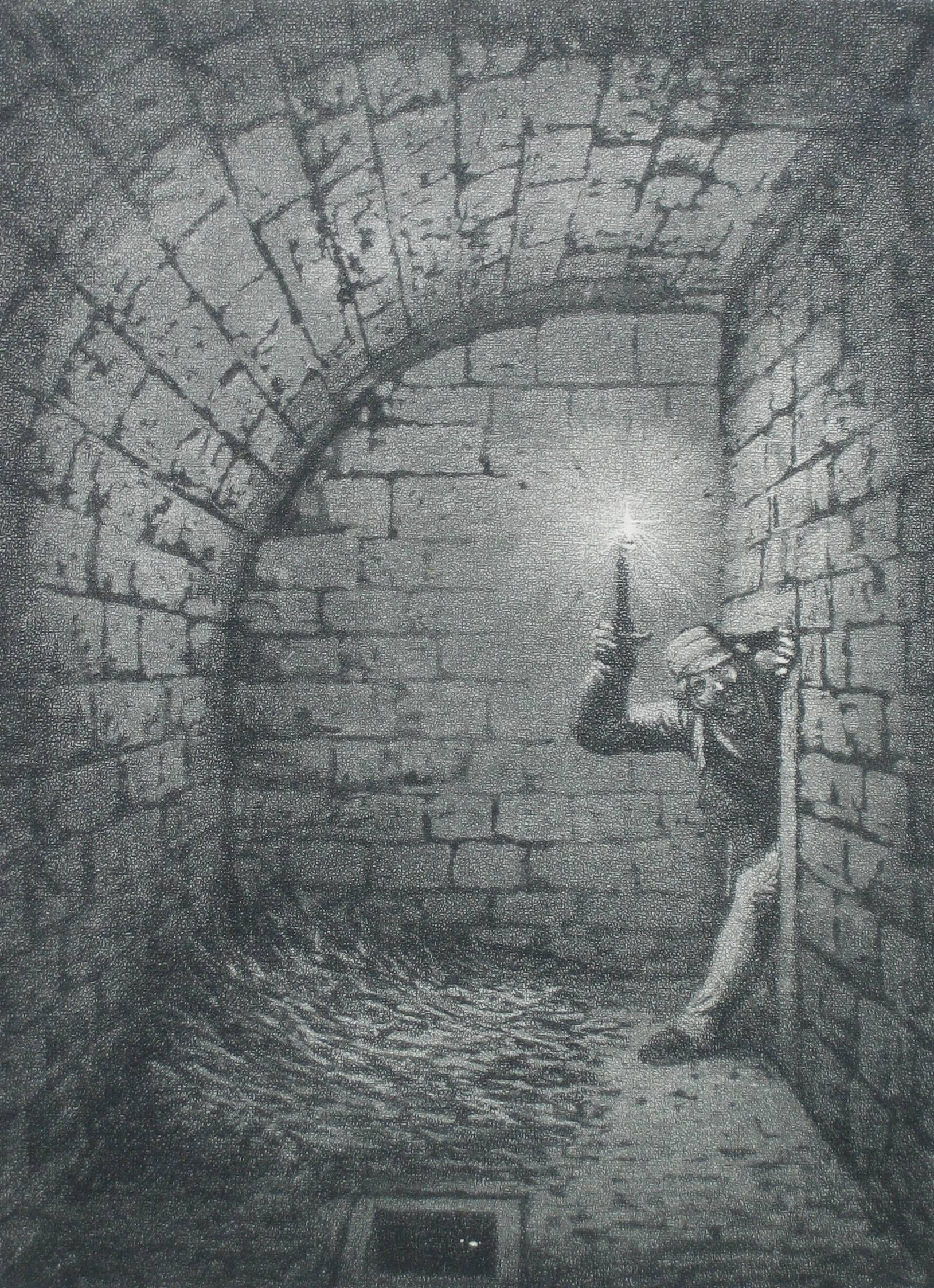
Cell on the ground floor

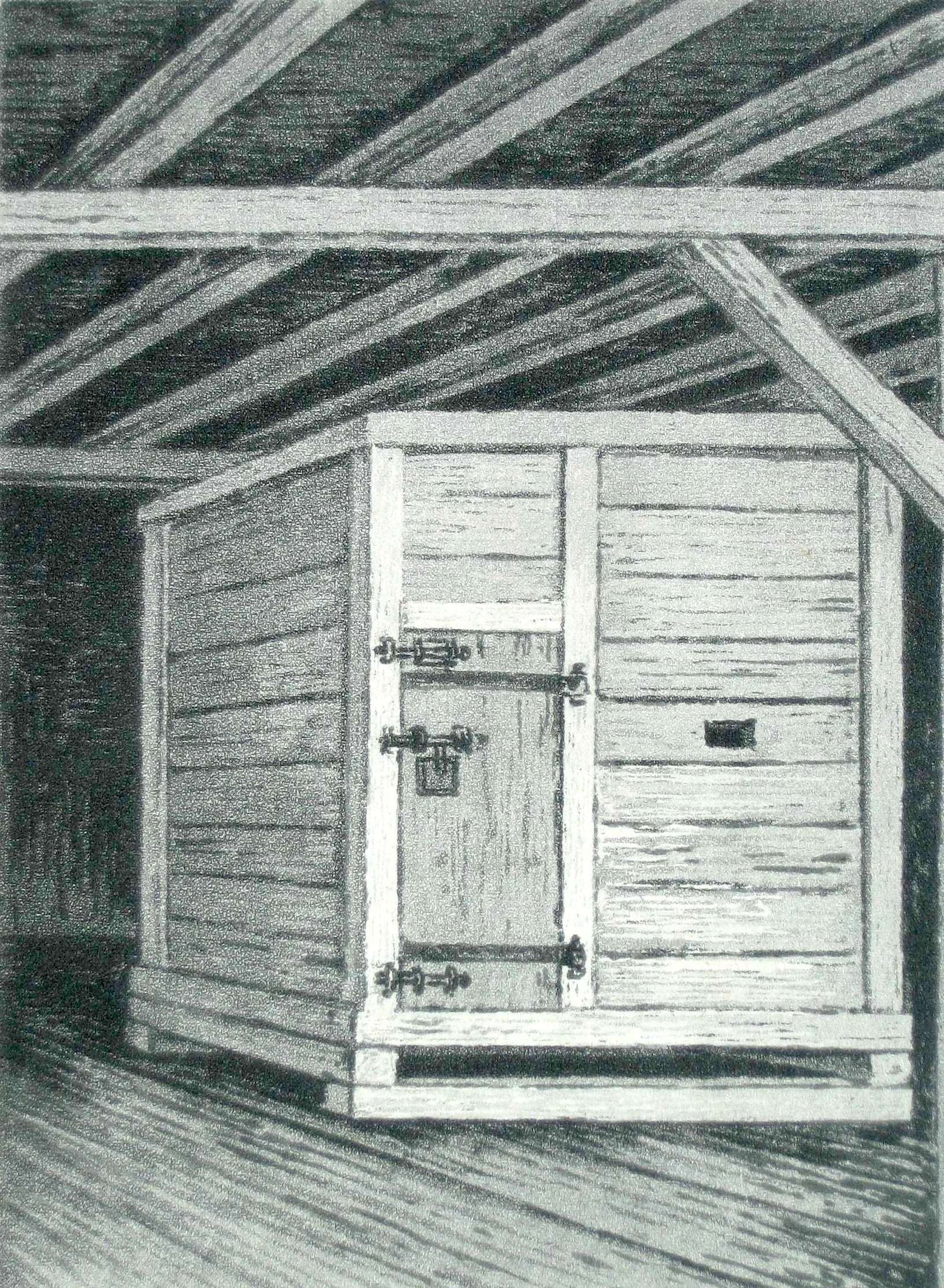
The blockhouse in the attic

== Prisoners ==
Prominent prisoners held in the Wellenberg included:

- Hans Waldmann – Zurich mayor, imprisoned in 1489
- Johann II of Habsburg-Laufenburg – imprisoned after the Night of Zurich murder in 1350
- Johannes von Bonstetten – Freiherr, imprisoned in 15th century
- Felix Manz – Anabaptist leader, imprisoned in 1526
- Johann Heinrich Waser – Zurich pastor and statistician, imprisoned and executed in 1780
- Hans Landis, one of the last Anabaptists to be executed in Zurich on April 18, 1614, after being imprisoned for five years. He refused to renounce adult baptism or agree to emigrate even under torture.

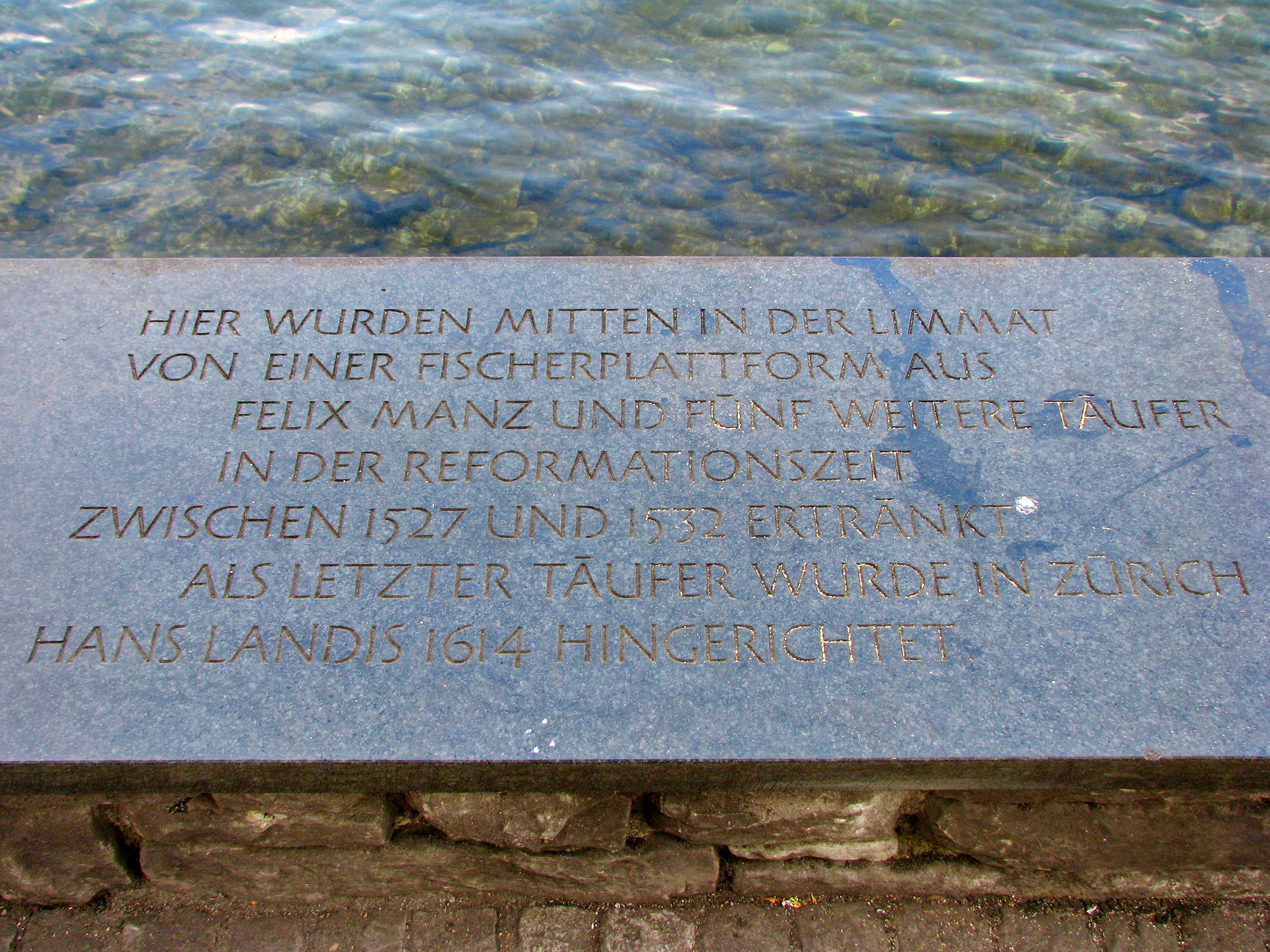
This plaque in Zurich at the former site of the Wellenberg Tower commemorates Hans Landis and other Anabaptists.

== Witch Hunts ==
According to the count by former state archivist Otto Sigg (2012), a total of 79 people were executed for witchcraft in Zurich during the period of the witch hunts, between 1487 and 1701. For some of these cases, Sigg cites interrogation protocols from Wellenberg, which were often obtained through the use of torture by stretching.
