= Sihlbrugg =

Village in Switzerland

Coordinates: 47.2176°N 8.5770°E

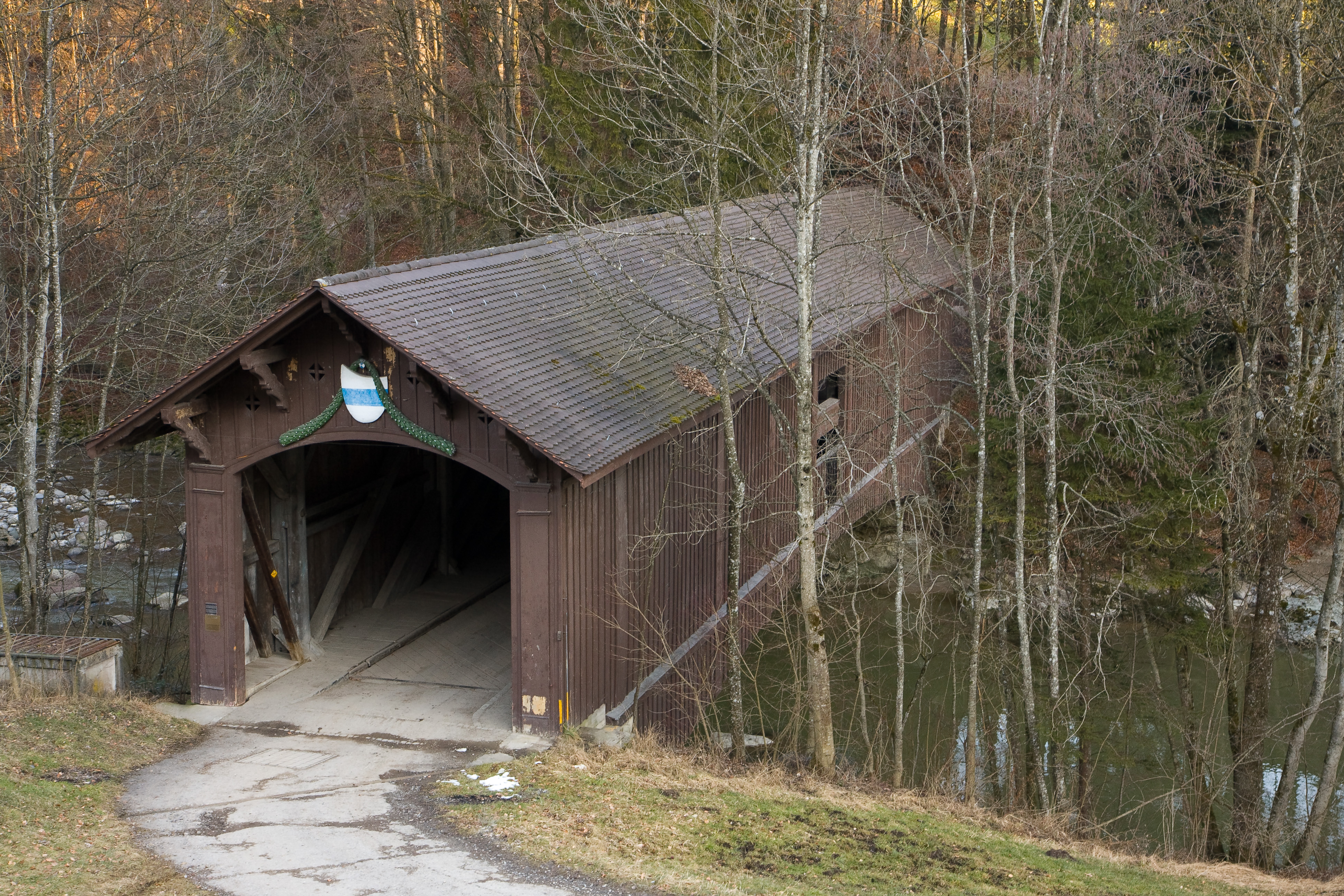
Babenwaag bridge in Sihlbrugg

Sihlbrugg is a village and important transportation node between the cantons of Zug (ZG) and Zürich (ZH) in Switzerland.

== Geography ==
Aerial view (1948)

Sihlbrugg is located in the Sihl Valley, at a point where the Sihl river is bridged by the road between Zug and Wädenswil. The village lies between the Albis chain and the Zimmerberg region serving as watershed between the Sihl and Lorze rivers. The village is located in the south of the so-called Sihlzopf and in the east of the Hirzel Pass.

Sihlbrugg is shared by the municipalities of Baar (ZG), Hausen am Albis (ZH), Hirzel (ZH) and Neuheim (ZG). Administratively the village belongs to Baar in the canton of Zug, and is known as Sihlbrugg Dorf to distinguish it from the nearby hamlet Sihlbrugg Station, which belongs completely to the municipality of Horgen in the canton of Zürich.

== Economy ==
The commercial and industrial area is majority-owned by the municipality of Baar. In addition, gas stations, hotels and catering facilities are located in Sihlbrugg; there are only a few apartment buildings situated in the village.

== Transportation ==
For centuries, the village was a small hamlet with a bridge crossing the Sihl river nearby the Lorze river. Sihlbrugg is a nodal point of the SBB-CFF-FFS and Sihltal Zürich Uetliberg Bahn (SZU) railways. Sihlbrugg Dorf (Sihlwald) is the terminal station of the S-Bahn Zürich on the line S4 (SZU). It is also important as terminal of the A4 motorway between the canton of Zug and the canton of Zürich, and as node of five regional streets in the Sihltal to Zürich, Langnau am Albis, Wädenswil (Hirzel Pass) and to the canton of Zug.
