= Yvonne Gilli =

Swiss physician and politician

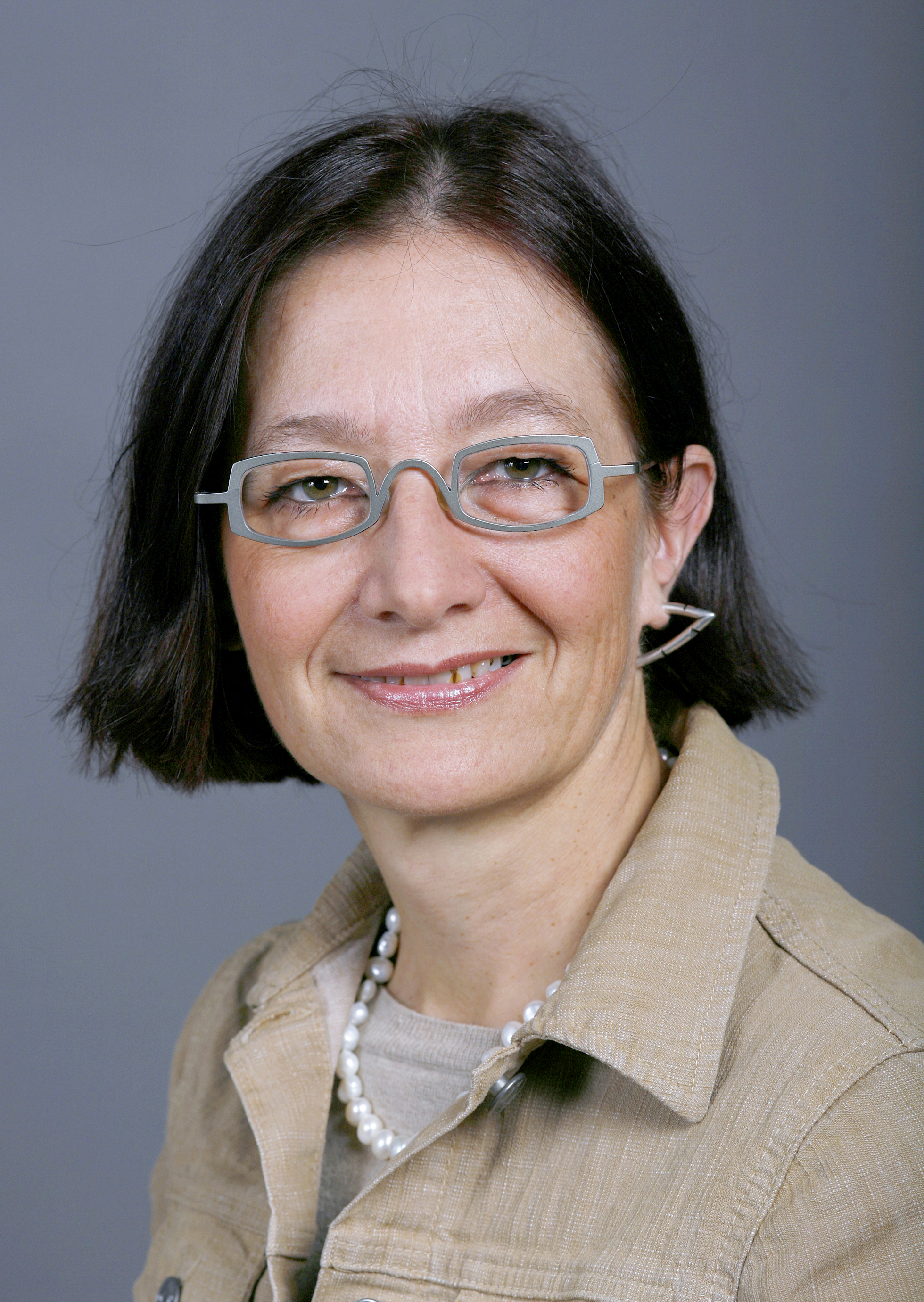

Yvonne Gilli (born 7 March 1957) is a physician and a Swiss political personality. She is a member of the Green Party of Switzerland.

== Biography ==
Gilli was born in Baar in the Canton of Zug. She completed a three-year diploma as a nurse after completing second-level education. Afterwards she took the secondary school leaving certificate and then studied medicine. Parallel to her studies, she continued her education in classical homeopathy and traditional Chinese medicine. Since 1996 she works in her own practice as a specialist in gynecology and additionally offers complementary medicine. She joined the Greens in 2000 in the Canton of St. Gallen and represented Wil from 2000 to 2005. From 2004 to 2007, she was a deputy in the Canton Parliament of the Canton of St. Gallen.

In October 2007, as part of the Swiss federal election, she was elected to the National Council, representing the Canton of St. Gallen. She was re-elected in 2011. She lost her seat where she served until 2015. She is married and has three children. Today she lives in Wil. Her hometown is Neudorf, Lucerne.
