= Orion Autobus =

Bus manufactured by Automobile Factory Orion

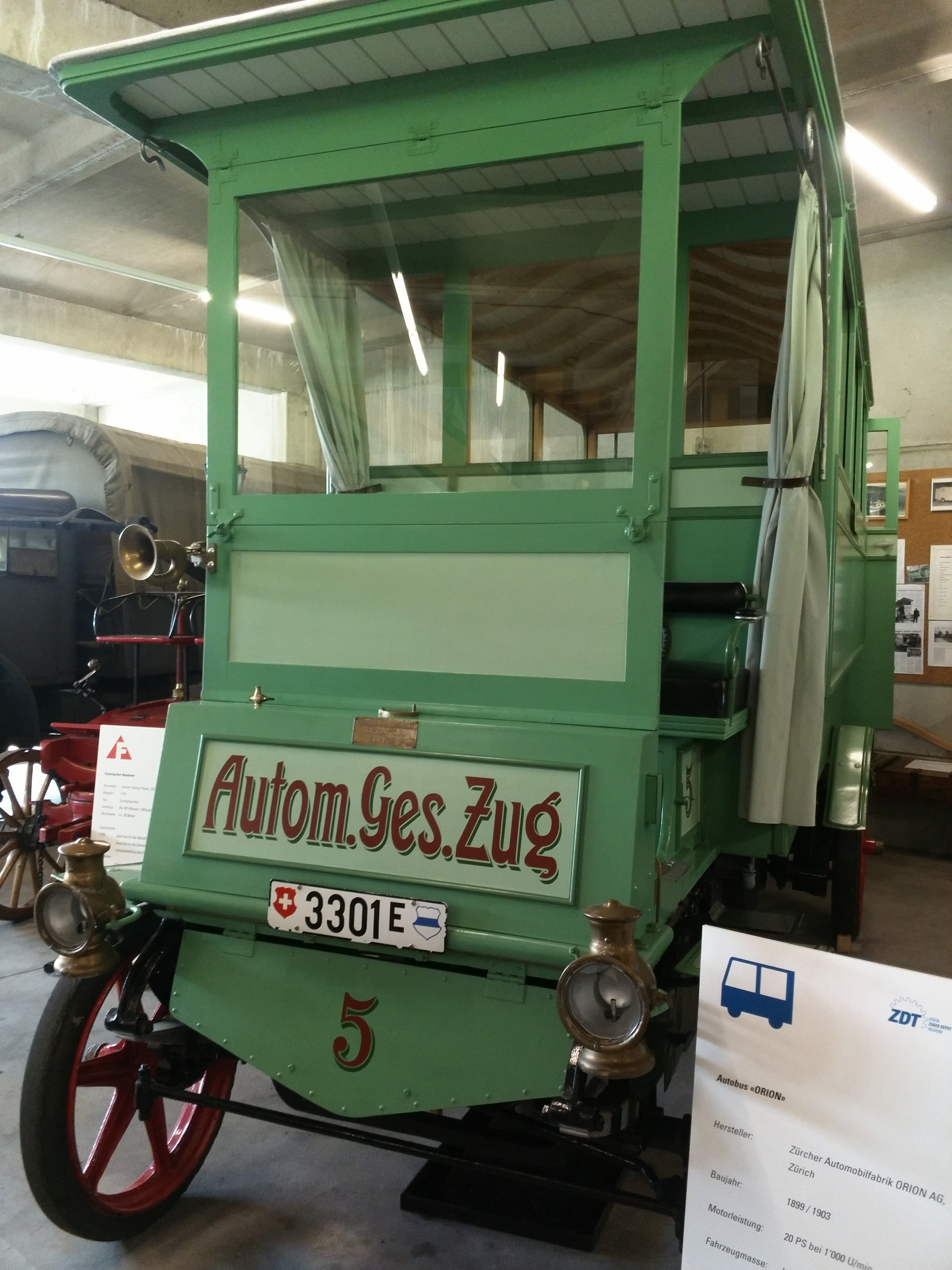
Orion Bus Front

The Orion Autobus is a bus from the Swiss manufacturer "Automobile Factory Orion" from Zurich.

== History and technical data ==
The Orion buses were built between 1899 and 1903 at the Orion factory at Zurich. They offered 12 seats for passengers. The entrance for the passenger compartment is at the rear. The vehicle is equipped with four solid rubber tires.

In August 1904, an automobile course was set up with Orion buses from the Aktiengesellschaft für Automobilverkehr im Kanton Zug from Zug via Hinterburg to Menzingen; An automobile course in the Ägerital was offered, which on 1 November 1905 took over also the post courses. The routes were extended to Zug - Baar - Menzingen and to Zug - Unterägeri - Oberägeri. However, in 1913, the tram canceled the automobile courses because the Orion buses were not yet reliable and with their solid rubber tires on the unpaved road not comfortable - the streetcar promised a quality increase. An Orion bus was stored in the Swiss Museum of Transport, it was restored by the Orion Club and since 1 April 2000 it has been an exhibit in the Zuger Depot Technikgeschichte.

== Data ==
| engine power | 15 kW (20 hp) at 1'000 / min. |
| Length | 5'000 mm |
| Width | 1'900 mm |
| Height | 3,100 mm |

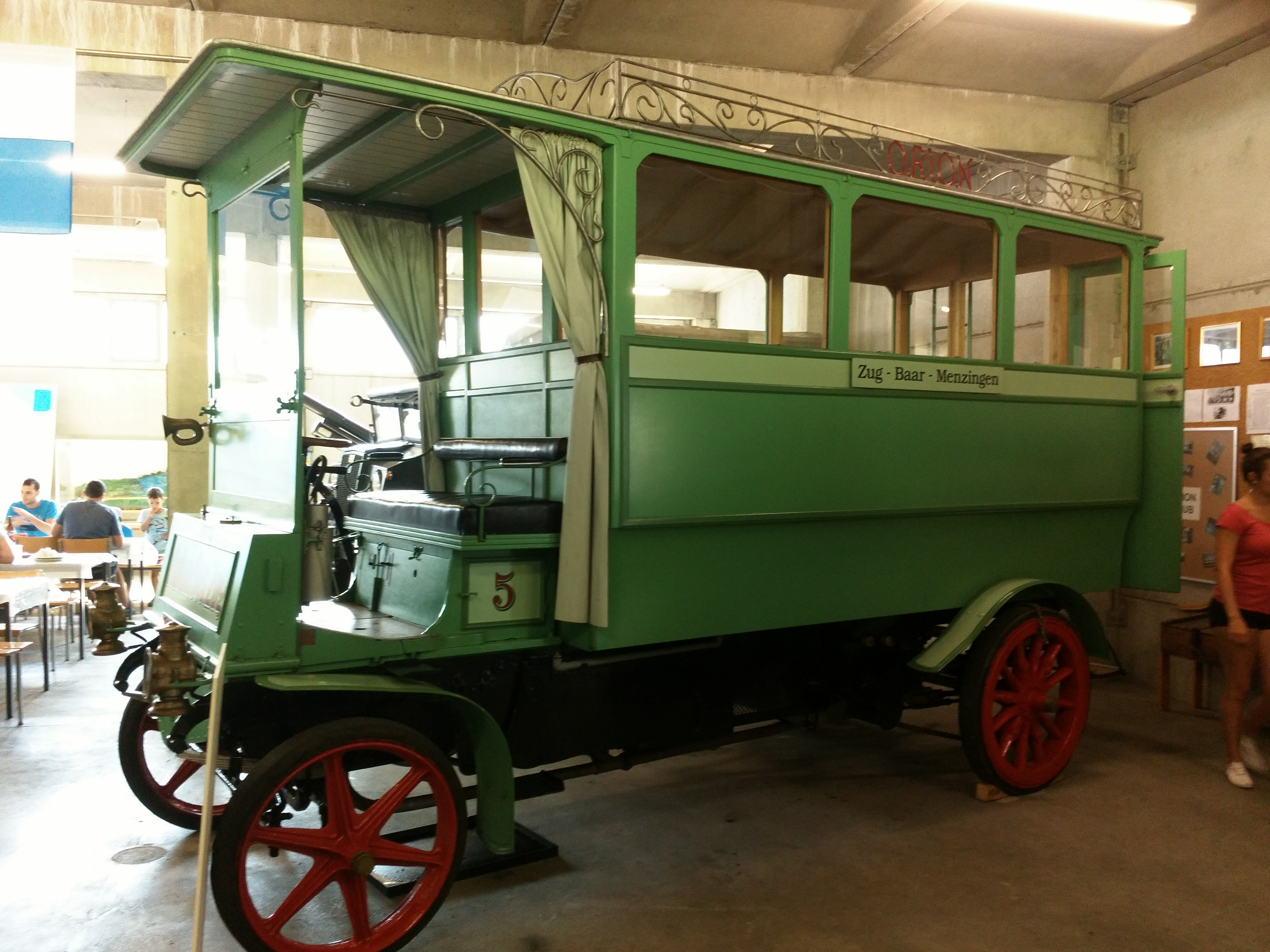

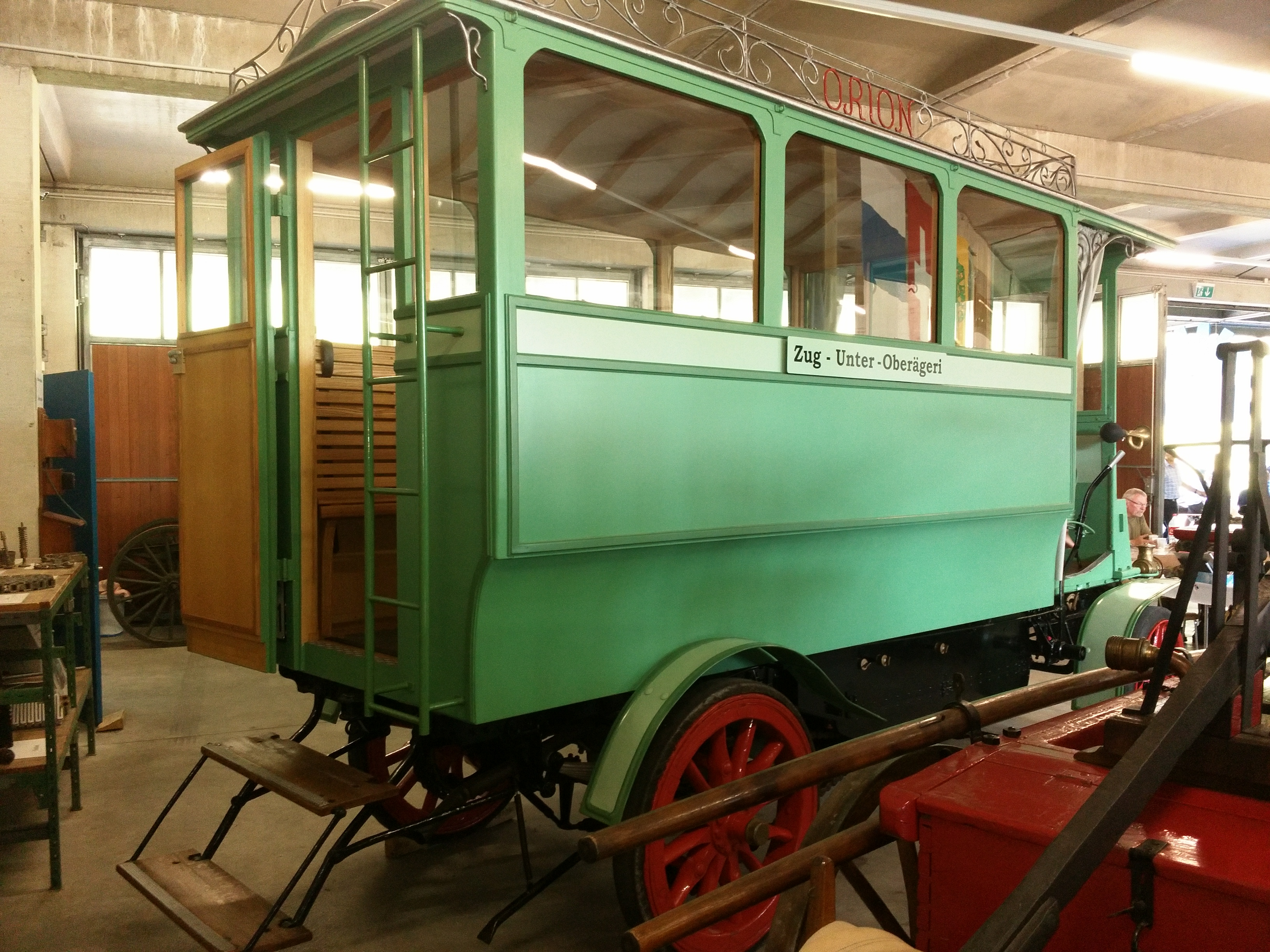

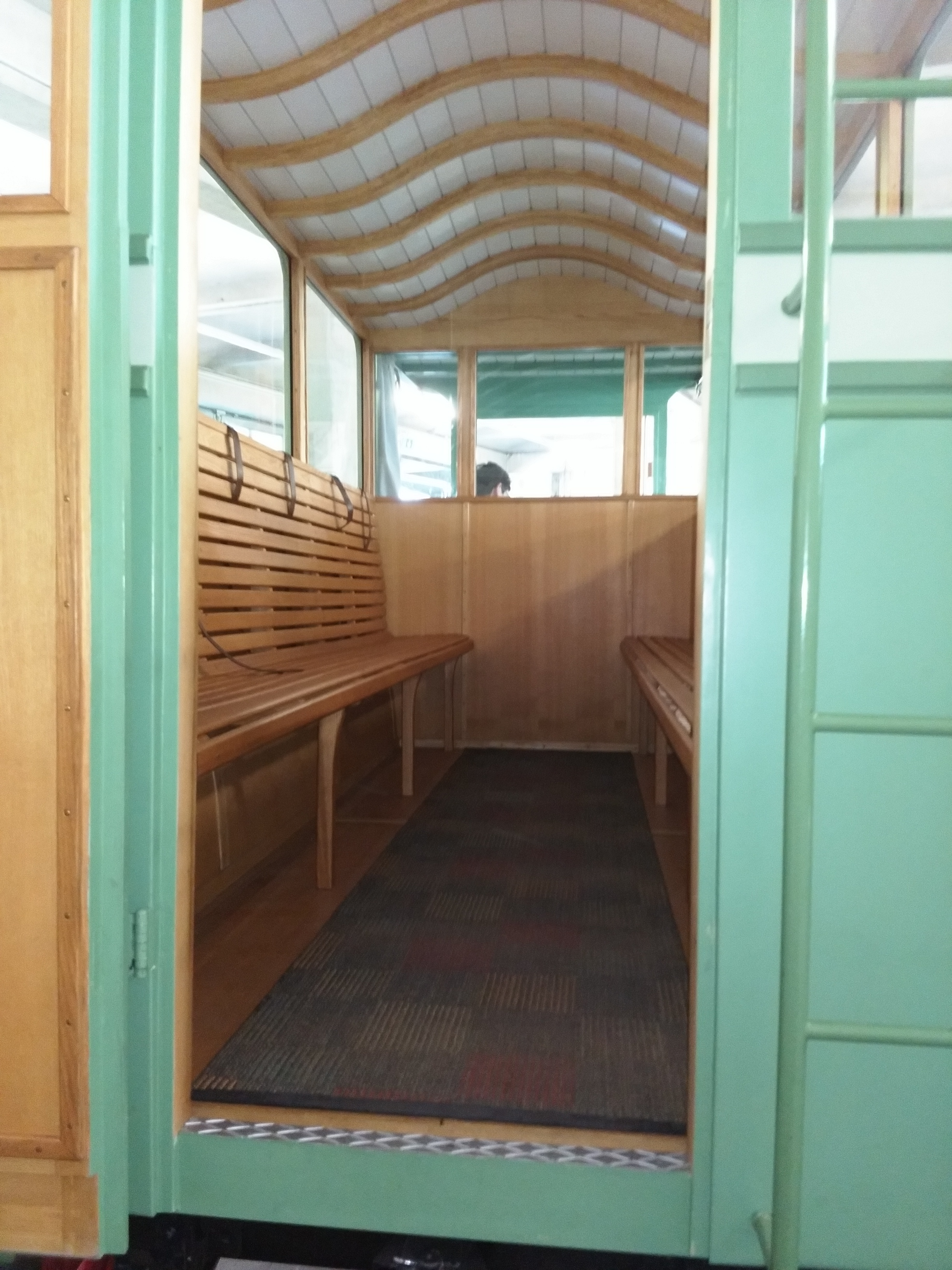
Entrance

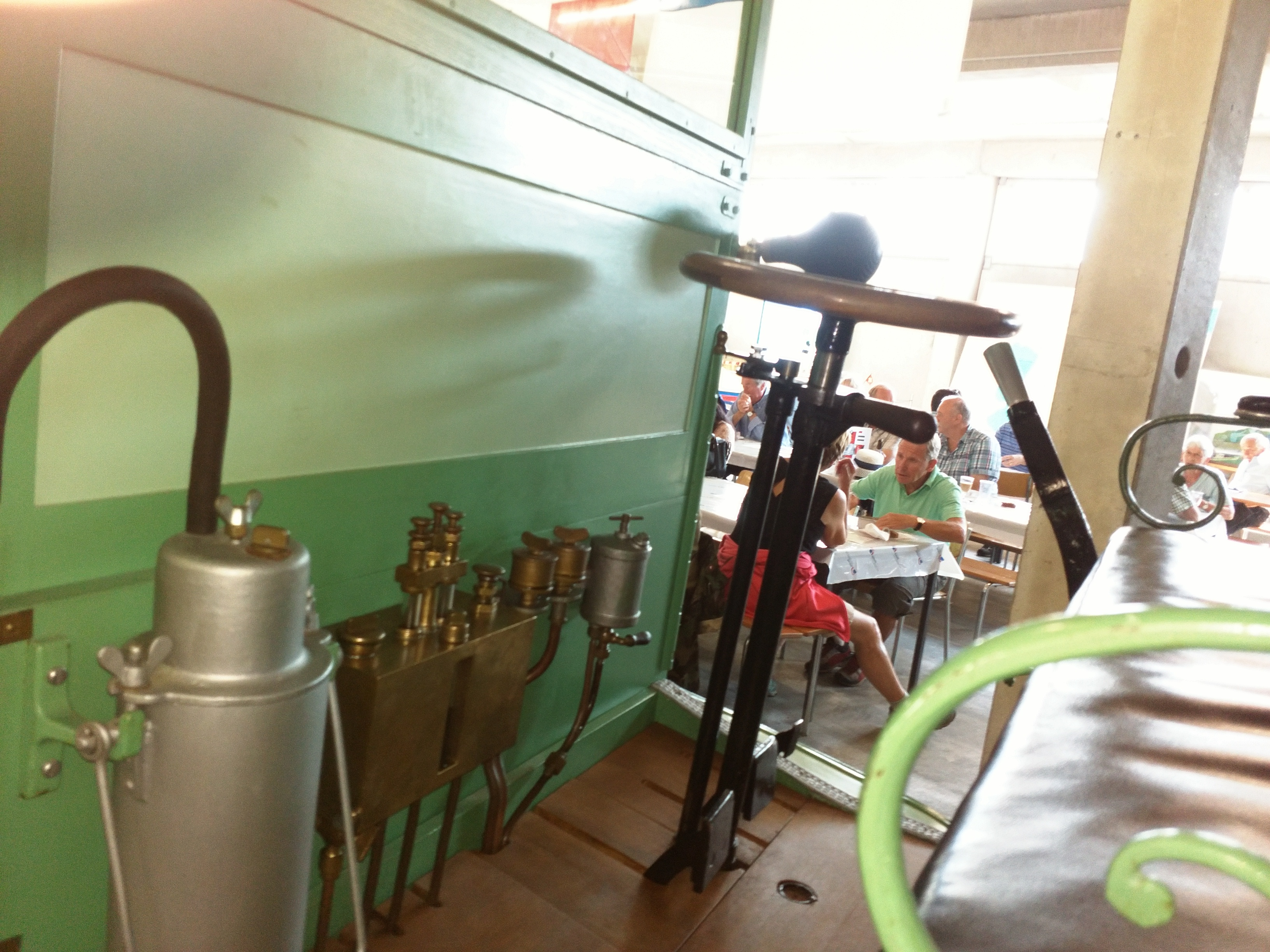
Drivers place
