= Neuheim =

- Municipality
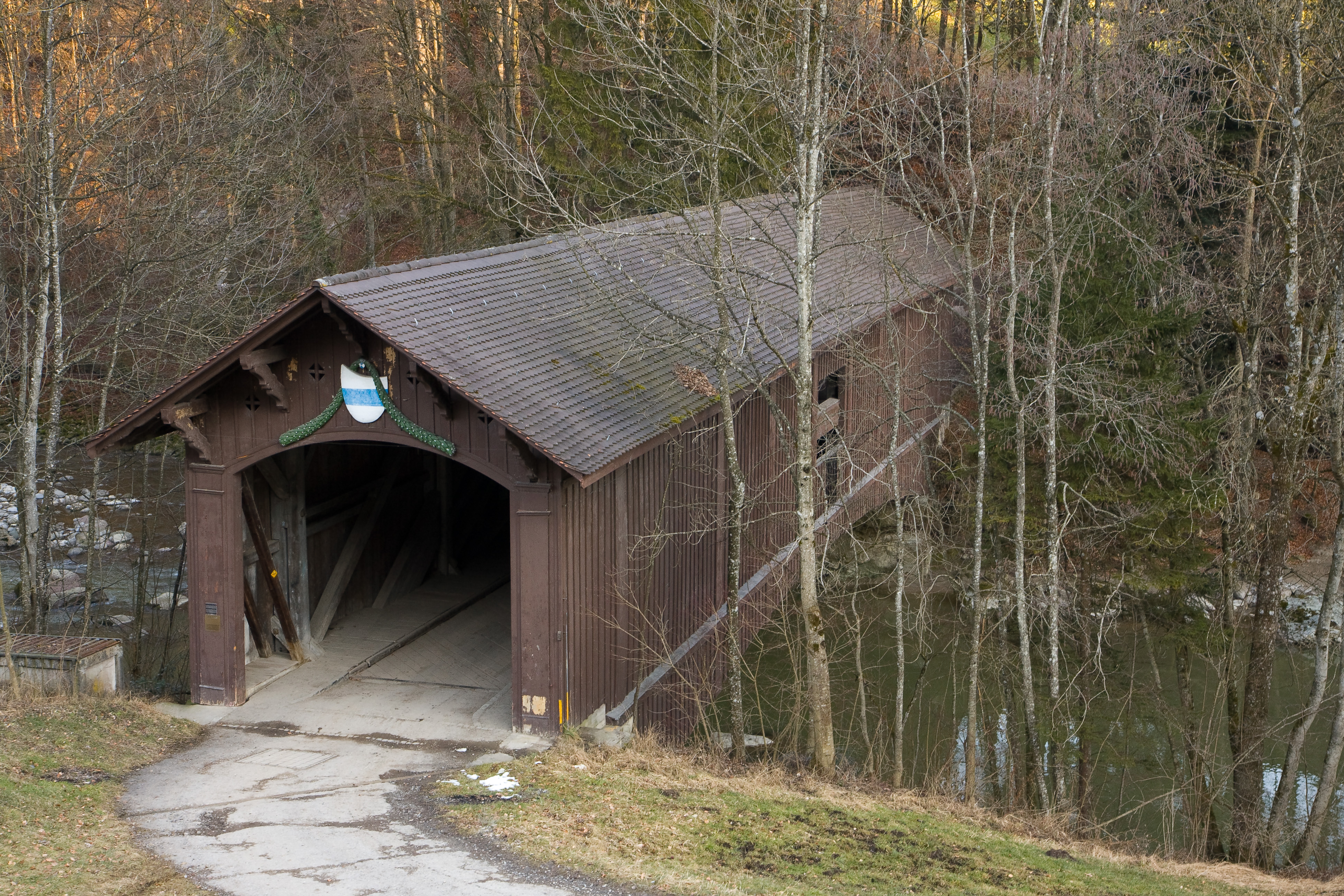

- Flag Coat of arms
- Location of Neuheim
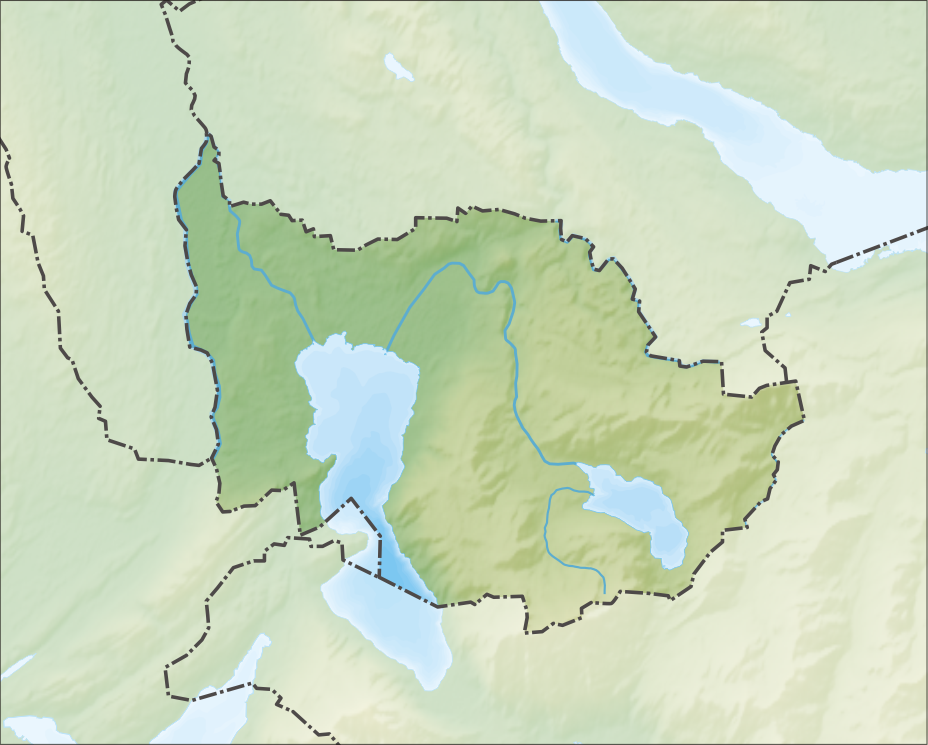
- Location within Switzerland Location within Canton of Zug
- Coordinates: 47°12′N 8°35′E
- Country: Switzerland
- Canton: Zug
- District: n.a.

Area
  - Total: 7.90 km^{2} (3.05 sq mi)
- Elevation: 666 m (2,185 ft)

Population (December 2020)
  - Total: 2,240
  - Density: 284/km^{2} (734/sq mi)
- Time zone: UTC+01:00 (CET)
  - Summer (DST): UTC+02:00 (CEST)
- Postal code: 6345
- SFOS number: 1705
- ISO 3166 code: CH-ZG
- Surrounded by: Baar, Hausen am Albis (ZH), Hirzel (ZH), Menzingen
- Website: www.neuheim.ch

Neuheim is a municipality in the canton of Zug in Switzerland.

== History ==
Aerial view (1966)

Neuheim is first mentioned in 1080 as Niuheim. In 1173 the parish church of St. Blasien was built and Neuheim became the center of the parish of Neuheim. The parish was originally part of Einsiedeln and in 1363 was transferred to Kappel Abbey. In 1512 the Abbey sold the rights to the parish income to the parish of Menzingen and also to the parish of Neuheim. Then, finally in 1675 the parish acquired complete rights to its income. Almost two centuries later, in 1848, the municipality joined the parish and became independent of Menzingen.

== Geography ==
Neuheim has an area, as of 2006, of 8 km^{2} (3.1 sq mi). Of this area, 65.8% is used for agricultural purposes, while 18.1% is forested. Of the rest of the land, 14.3% is settled (buildings or roads) and the remainder (1.8%) is non-productive (rivers, glaciers or mountains).

The municipality is located in the moraine landscape between the Lorze and Sihl rivers. It shares the village of Sihlbrugg with Baar (ZG), Hausen am Albis (ZH), Hirzel (ZH). The village is part of an important transportation route between Zürich and the Innerschweiz (Central Switzerland).

== Demographics ==
Neuheim has a population (as of 31 December 2020) of 2,240. As of 2007, 17.3% of the population was made up of foreign nationals. Over the last 10 years, the population has grown at a rate of 3.7%. Most of the population (as of 2000) speaks German (87.9%), with Serbo-Croatian being second most common (2.1%) and French being third (1.5%).

In the 2007 federal election, the most popular party was the SVP which received 33.1% of the vote. The next three most popular parties were the FDP (30.8%), the CVP (18.7%) and the Green Party (12.4%).

In Neuheim, about 78.4% of the population (between age 25–64) have completed either non-mandatory upper secondary education or additional higher education (either university or a Fachhochschule).

Neuheim has an unemployment rate of 1.14%. As of 2005, there were 83 people employed in the primary economic sector and about 35 businesses involved in this sector. 365 people are employed in the secondary sector and there are 36 businesses in this sector. 473 people are employed in the tertiary sector, with 104 businesses in this sector.

Neuheim's main religion is Roman Catholicism, with 62% of the population. The rest are primarily Swiss Reformed Church, Denominationless, or Non-Religious.

The historical population is given in the following table:

year	population
1743	442
1799	532
1850	764
1900	605
1950	739
1970	781
