= Hans Landis =

Swiss Anabaptist Martyr

- Born: c. 1568; Hirzel, Switzerland
- Died: 30 September 1614; Zürich, Switzerland
- Cause of death: Execution by beheading
- Occupation: Anabaptist leader
- Known for: Anabaptist martyrdom

Hans Landis (c. 1568 – 30 September 1614) was a Swiss Anabaptist leader and martyr. Known for his steadfast faith and leadership among the Mennonites, Landis's execution marked a significant moment in the history of Anabaptist persecution.

== Early life ==
Hans Landis was born around 1568 in Hirzel, near Zürich, Switzerland. Little is known about his early life, but he emerged as a prominent figure within the Anabaptist community, which faced severe persecution from both Protestant and Catholic authorities. The Anabaptists, part of the Radical Reformation, rejected infant baptism, insisting that baptism should only be performed on consenting adults.

== Leadership and persecution ==
By the late 16th century, Landis had become a recognized leader among the Mennonites in the Zürich area. His leadership role and outspoken faith drew the ire of local authorities. The Swiss authorities, particularly in Zürich, were determined to eradicate Anabaptism, viewing it as a threat to both religious and social order.

In 1613, Landis was arrested and sentenced to life imprisonment. However, he managed to escape and continued his ministry secretly, which increased his followers' admiration and loyalty. His defiance and continued activities led to his re-arrest in 1614.

== Martyrdom ==
Hans Landis was sentenced to death and executed by beheading on 30 September 1614. His execution took place in Zürich, making him one of the last Anabaptist martyrs in the region. Landis’s martyrdom is remembered for his unwavering commitment to his faith and his community in the face of severe persecution.

== Legacy ==
Hans Landis's death had a profound impact on the Anabaptist community. It exemplified the extreme measures taken by authorities to suppress religious dissent and highlighted the resilience of the Anabaptist faith. His legacy is preserved through various historical accounts and Mennonite traditions. A marker is also found at the location of his execution.
