= Hirzel =

- Former municipality
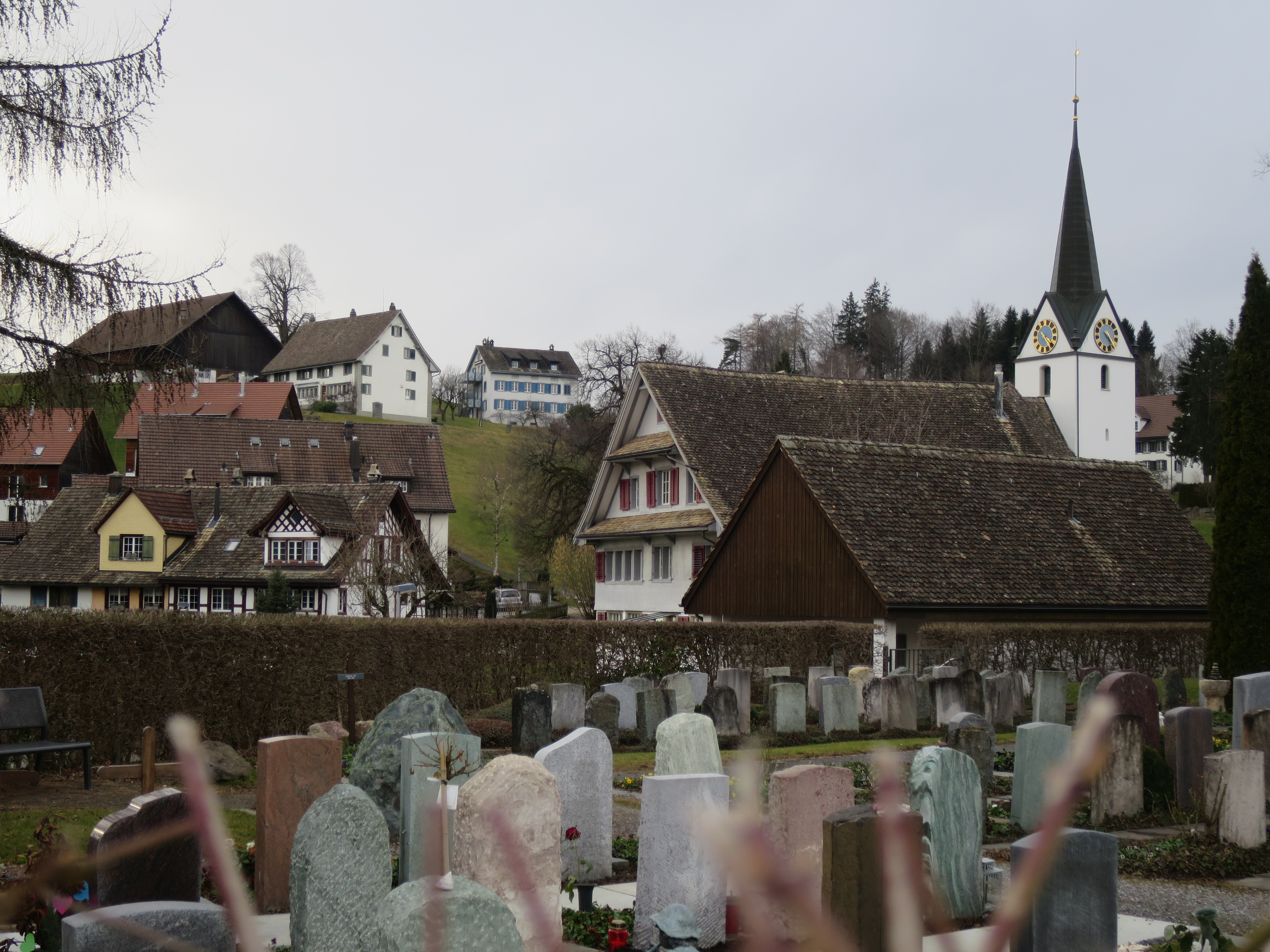

- Flag Coat of arms
- Location of Hirzel
- Location within Switzerland Location within Canton of Zurich
- Coordinates: 47°13′N 8°36′E
- Country: Switzerland
- Canton: Zurich
- District: Horgen

Area
  - Total: 9.68 km^{2} (3.74 sq mi)
- Elevation: 678 m (2,224 ft)

Population (December 2020)
  - Total: 2,179
  - Density: 225/km^{2} (583/sq mi)
- Time zone: UTC+01:00 (CET)
  - Summer (DST): UTC+02:00 (CEST)
- Postal code: 8816
- SFOS number: 132
- ISO 3166 code: CH-ZH
- Surrounded by: Hausen am Albis, Horgen, Menzingen (ZG), Neuheim (ZG), Schönenberg, Wädenswil
- Website: www.horgen.ch

Hirzel is a former municipality in the district of Horgen in the canton of Zürich in Switzerland. On 1 January 2018 the former municipality of Hirzel merged into the municipality of Horgen.

== History ==
Hirzel is first mentioned in 1269 as Hirsol.

== Geography ==
Aerial view (1947)

Hirzel spans an area of 9.6 km^{2} (3.7 sq mi). Of this area, 68.9% is used for agricultural purposes, while 18.5% is forested. Of the rest of the land, 9.3% is settled (buildings or roads) and the remainder (3.3%) is non-productive (rivers, glaciers or mountains). In 1996 housing and buildings made up 7.2% of the total area, while transportation infrastructure made up the rest (2.2%). Of the total unproductive area, water (streams and lakes) made up 1.1% of the area. As of 2007 4% of the total municipal area was undergoing some type of construction.

The municipality includes the sections of Hirzel-Kirche, Hirzel-Spitzen and Hirzel-Höchi. In 1878 the municipality borders were surveyed and moved. As a result, several individual farm houses came to Hirzel from Wädenswil, with four more from Horgen.

== Demographics ==
Hirzel has a population (as of 31 December 2020) of 2,179. As of 2007, 8.2% of the population was made up of foreign nationals. As of 2008 the gender distribution of the population was 49.6% male and 50.4% female. Over the last 10 years the population has decreased at a rate of -1.9%. Most of the population (as of 2000) speaks German (93.8%), with English being second most common ( 1.7%) and French being third ( 0.9%).

In the 2007 election the most popular party was the SVP, which received 39.6% of the vote. The next two most popular parties were the SPS (15.7%), the FDP (11.3%).

The age distribution of the population (as of 2000) comprises children and teenagers (0–19 years old) who make up 27.7% of the population, adults (20–64 years old) make up 59.3% and seniors (over 64 years old) make up 12.9%. The entire Swiss population is generally well-educated. In Hirzel about 84.8% of the population (between age 25-64) have completed either non-mandatory upper secondary education or additional higher education (either university or a Fachhochschule). There are 727 households in Hirzel.

Hirzel has an unemployment rate of 0.7%. As of 2005, there were 101 people employed in the primary economic sector and about 43 businesses involved in this sector. 105 people are employed in the secondary sector and there are 22 businesses in this sector. 296 people are employed in the tertiary sector, with 66 businesses in this sector. As of 2007 49.6% of the working population were employed full-time, and 50.4% were employed part-time.

Year	Population
1678	c. 800
1786	c. 1,300
1850	1,219
1900	1,154
1941	977
1950	1,094
2000	1,900

As of 2008 there were 535 Catholics and 1063 Protestants in Hirzel. In the 2000 census, religion was broken down into several smaller categories. From the census, 56.7% were some type of Protestant, with 54.3% belonging to the Swiss Reformed Church and 2.4% belonging to other Protestant churches. 27.7% of the population were Catholic. Of the rest of the population, 0% were Muslim, 2.3% belonged to another religion (not listed), 3.5% did not give a religion, and 9.7% were atheist or agnostic.

The historical population is given in the following table:

== Notable people ==
- Meta Heusser-Schweizer, poet
- Hans Landis, Anabaptist leader and martyr, born c. 1568.
- Johanna Spyri, Author of Heidi
- Jack Gunthard, Athlete

== Transportation ==
The Zimmerberg bus line (Zimmerbergbus), provided by the Sihltal Zürich Uetliberg Bahn (SZU), connects the Zimmerberg region and parts of the Sihl valley.
