= Baar, Switzerland =

Baar
- Municipality
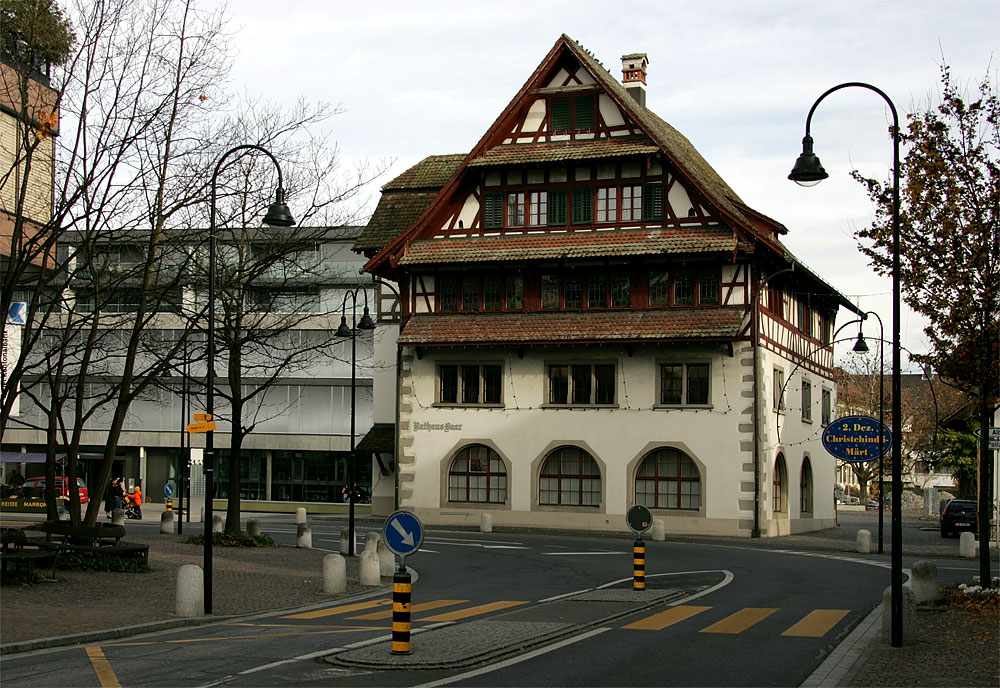

- Flag Coat of arms
- Location of Baar
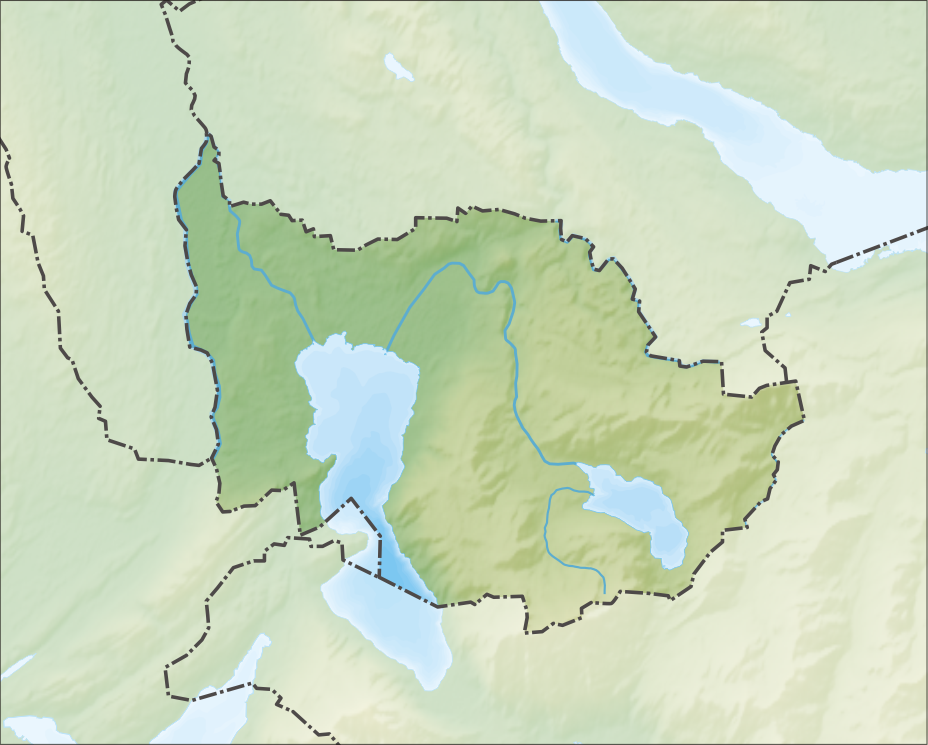
- Location within Switzerland Location within Canton of Zug
- Coordinates: 47°12′N 8°31′E
- Country: Switzerland
- Canton: Zug
- District: n.a.

Government
  - Executive: Gemeinderat with 7 members
  - Mayor: Gemeindepräsident (list); Andreas Hotz (as of March 2014)

Area
  - Total: 24.8 km^{2} (9.6 sq mi)
- Elevation: 443 m (1,453 ft)

Population (December 2020)
  - Total: 24,686
  - Density: 995/km^{2} (2,580/sq mi)
- Time zone: UTC+01:00 (CET)
  - Summer (DST): UTC+02:00 (CEST)
- Postal code: 6340, 6342
- SFOS number: 1701
- ISO 3166 code: CH-ZG
- Localities: Allenwinden, Blickensdorf, Deinikon, Inwil bei Baar, Neuägeri, Sihlbrugg Dorf, Walterswil
- Surrounded by: Hausen am Albis (ZH), Kappel am Albis (ZH), Menzingen, Neuheim, Steinhausen, Unterägeri, Zug
- Website: www.baar.ch

Baar (Swiss Standard German pronunciation: [baːr]) is a municipality in the canton of Zug in Switzerland.

== History ==
Baar is first mentioned in 1045 as Barra.

== Geography ==
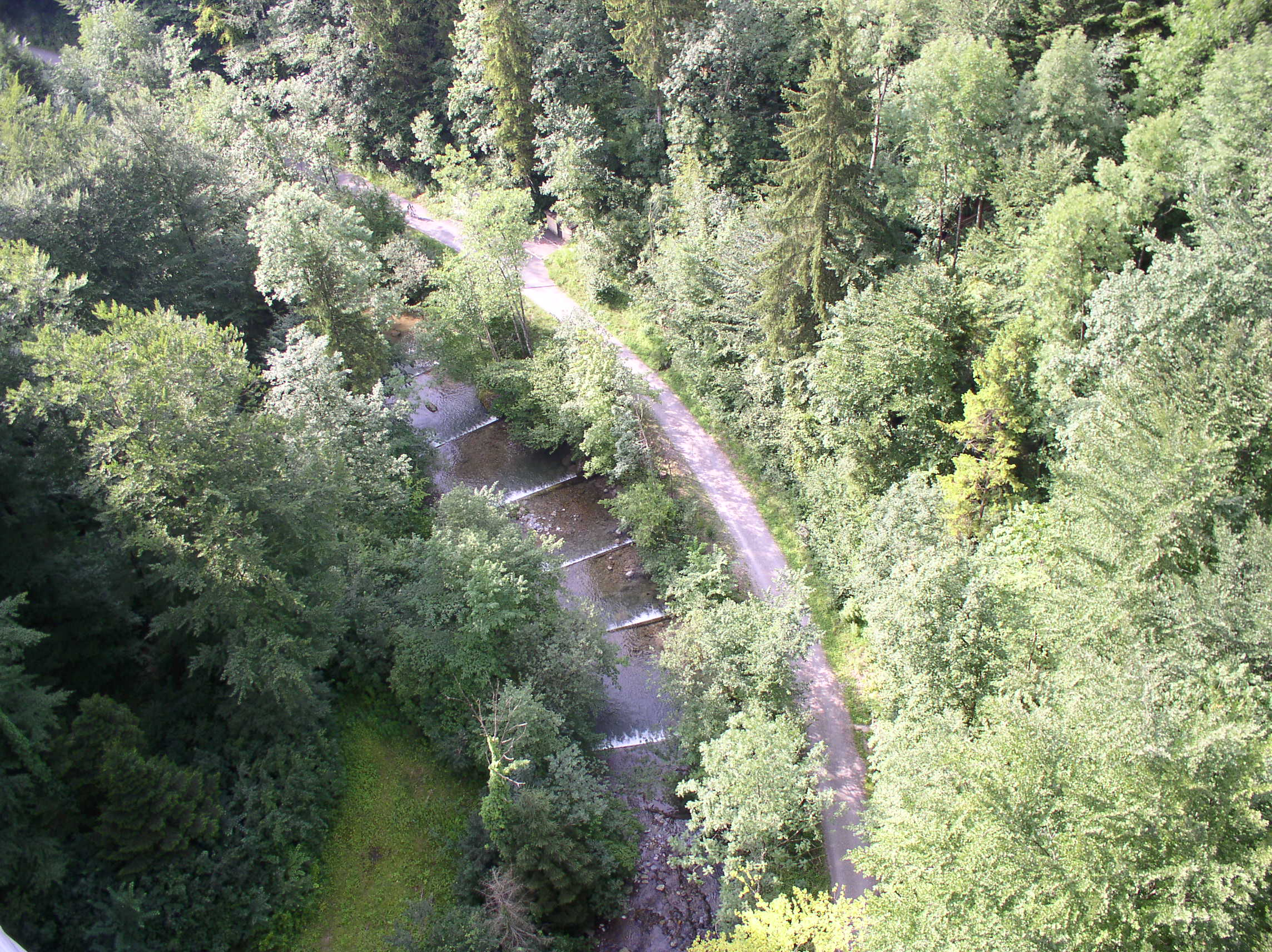
Lorze river near Baar

Aerial view from 500 m by Walter Mittelholzer (1919)

Baar has an area, as of 2016, of 24.85 km^{2} (9.59 sq mi). Of this area, 51% is used for agricultural purposes, while 25% is forested. Of the rest of the land, 22.8% is settled (buildings or roads) and the remainder (0.8%) is non-productive (rivers, glaciers or mountains).

The municipality is located in the northern portion of the flood plain of the Lorze river. It was originally a linear village along the road between Lake Zug and Lake Zurich. Since the 1960s it has grown rapidly. It consists of the village of Baar and the former hamlets of Allenwinden, Blickensdorf and Inwil, as well as the farm houses of Deinikon.

== Demographics ==
Baar has a population (as of 31 December 2020) of 24,686. As of 2007, 24.9% of the population was made up of foreign nationals. Over the last 10 years, the population has grown at a rate of 20.9%. Most of the population (as of 2000) speaks German (83.1%), with Italian being second most common (3.6%) and Serbo-Croatian being third (3.1%).

In the 2007 federal election, the most popular party was the SVP which received 31.2% of the vote. The next three most popular parties were the CVP (22.9%), the FDP (18.2%) and the Green Party (17.7%).

The historical population is given in the following table:

Year	Population
1743	1,831
1850	2,346
1860	3,323
1900	4,484
1950	6,992
1960	9,114
1970	14,074
1990	16,147

== Education ==
In Baar about 72% of the population (between age 25-64) have completed either non-mandatory upper secondary education or additional higher education (either university or a Fachhochschule).

Baar is home to the International School of Zug and Luzern, or ISZL. The ISZL is an independent co-educational, non-profit day school, from Pre-School to Grade 12 serving the international community of Central Switzerland.

The municipality has a stadium, named Waldmannhalle, with fixed seating for 1,200 people. This regular capacity can be extended to 3,000 for larger events.

== Industry ==
From 1980 to 2006, it was also home to Lego Produktions AG Schweiz, a toy manufacturing plant owned by the Lego Group where some Lego parts, especially those for the Lego Technic building sets, were manufactured. In 2006, the Lego Group announced a restructuring of the current production setup including the outsourcing of some of the production work to Flextronics, a Singaporean electronics company. Lego Produktion AG in Baar was to be shut down and its operations moved to a plant now owned by Flextronics in Kladno, Czech Republic. Lego Technic parts would still be manufactured in the headquarters at Billund, Denmark, which then had a workforce of 3,000.

Baar serves as the official headquarters of Glencore, the global producer and trader of commodities, Sika AG, a chemical company with products for construction and automotive, and Veeam, an independent software vendor.

Baar has an unemployment rate of 2.26%. As of 2005, there were 333 people employed in the primary economic sector and about 94 businesses involved in this sector. 3,810 people are employed in the secondary sector and there are 278 businesses in this sector. 9,335 people are employed in the tertiary sector, with 1,415 businesses in this sector.

Baar is also home to the Typo3 Association, which moderates the free open source content management system Typo3.

== Transportation ==
Baar railway station is a stop on the InterRegio service between Zürich Hauptbahnhof and Lucerne, serviced every full hour, as well as on the Zurich S-Bahn service S24 between Zug and Zürich Oerlikon. Several stops of the Stadtbahn Zug are in Baar.

In the summer months it is possible to rent free bikes to bike around Baar. This can be done near the Rathaus.

== Notable people ==
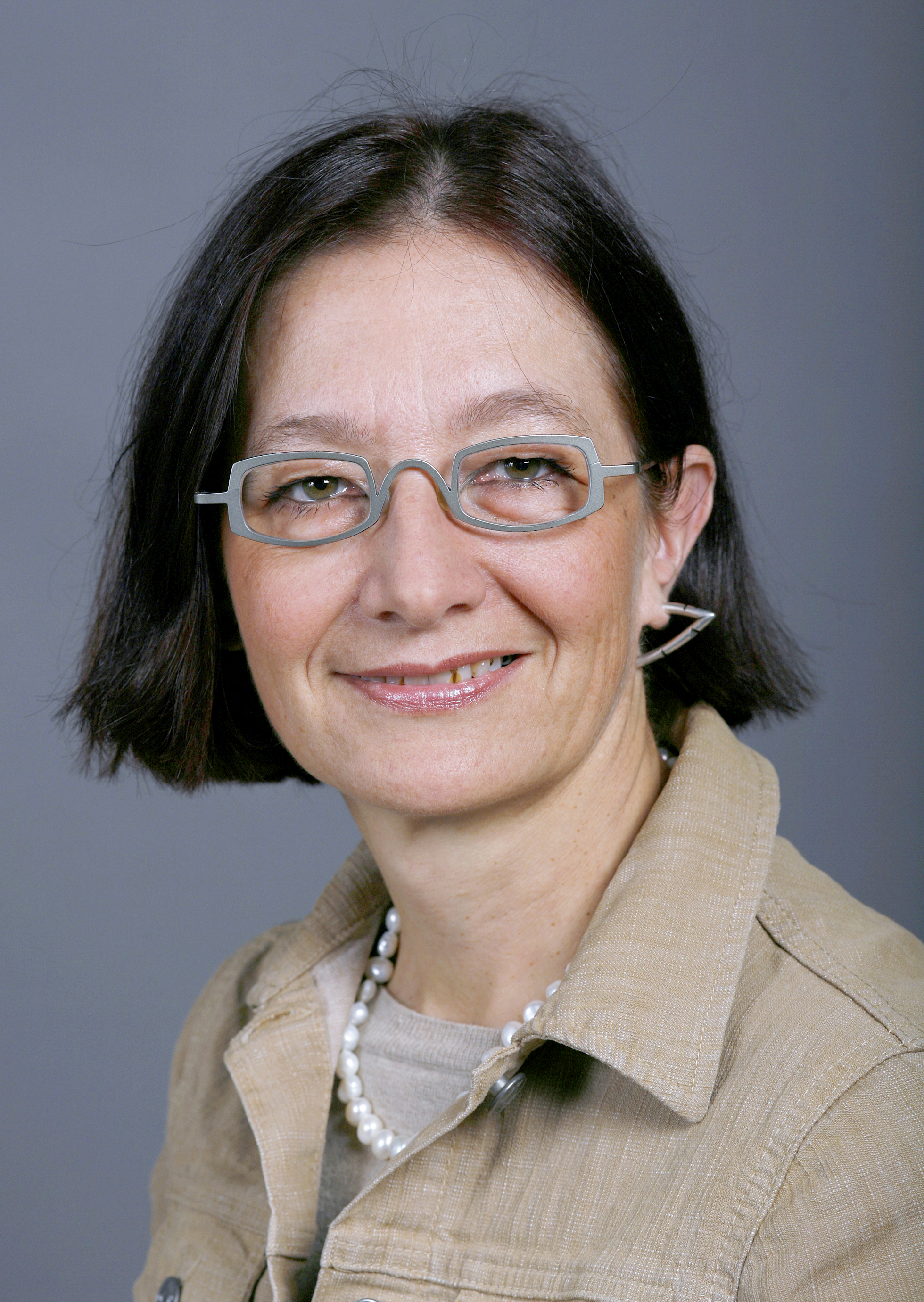
Yvonne Gilli, 2008

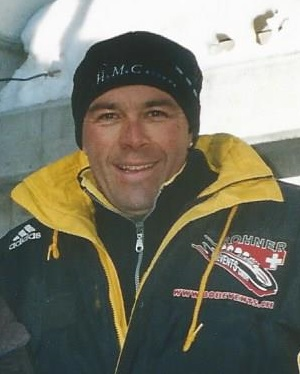
Marcel Rohner, c. 2013

- Martin Schmid (1694 in Baar – 1772), Jesuit, missionary, musician and architect, worked mainly in Bolivia.
- Max Huber (1919 in Baar – 1992), an influential graphic designer
- Yvonne Gilli (born 1957 in Baar), physician and politician, Swiss National Council 2007-2015

Sport

- Harry Froboess (1899–1985 in Baar), a German stunt diver and high diver
- Kurt Schmid (born 1932 in Baar), rower, competed in the 1952 and 1960 Summer Olympics
- Pirmin Stierli (born 1947 in Baar), former Swiss football player, 187 club caps and 16 for Switzerland
- Martin Andermatt (born 1961 in Baar), football manager who coaches AC Bellinzona
- Marcel Rohner (born 1964 in Baar), bobsledder, silver medallist in the 1998 Winter Olympics
- Brigitte McMahon (born 1967 in Baar), former elite triathlete, competed in the 2000 (Olympic Champion) and the 2004
- Patrick de Napoli (born 1975 in Baar), footballer of Italian descent, about 650 club caps
- Moreno Merenda (born 1978 in Baar), former footballer, about 400 club caps, assistant manager of SC Cham
- Kimi Räikkönen (born 1979), Formula-1 driver and former WRC-driver, used to live in Baar.
- Daniela Diaz (born 1982 in Baar), ice hockey coach and former player, coached the Swiss national team
- Raphael Diaz (born 1986 in Baar), ice-hockey player with the New York Rangers
- Sebastian Vettel (born 1987), Formula-1 driver lives in a house in Baar
- Jannik Fischer (born 1990 in Baar), ice hockey defenceman
