= Menzingen =

Municipality in Zug, Switzerland

- Municipality
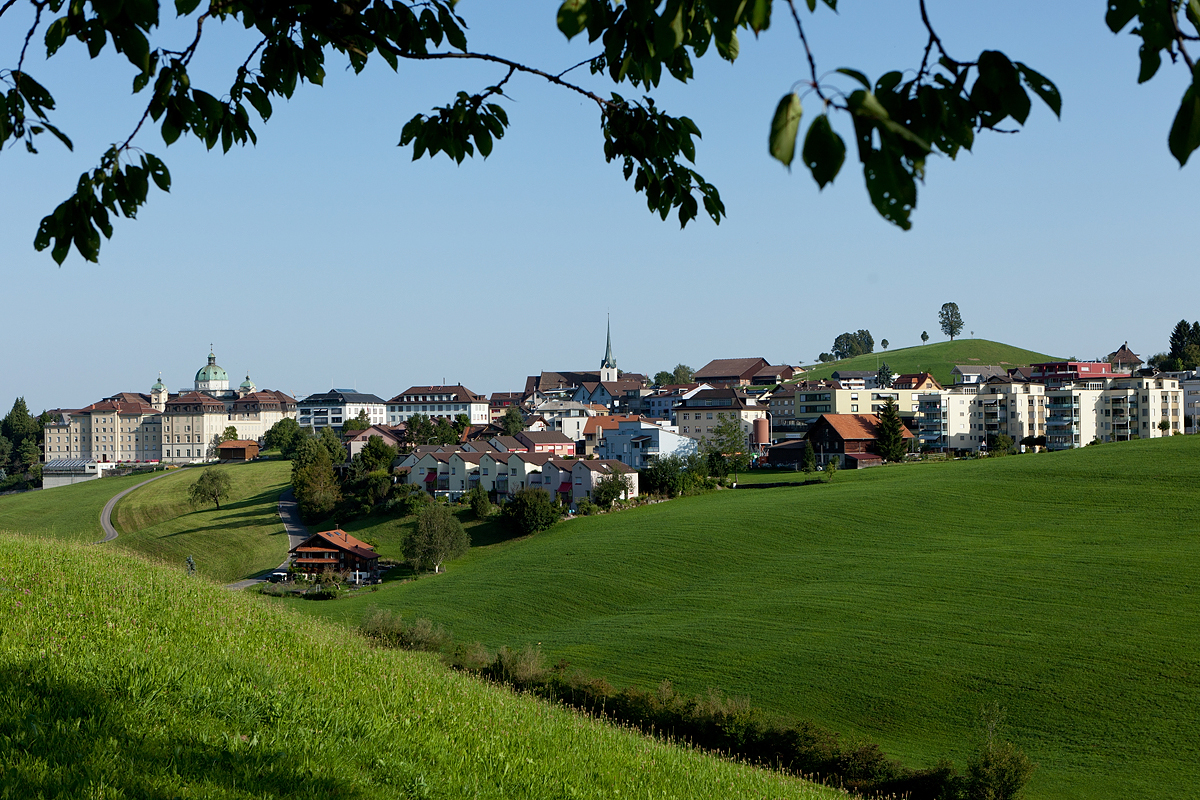

- Flag Coat of arms
- Location of Menzingen
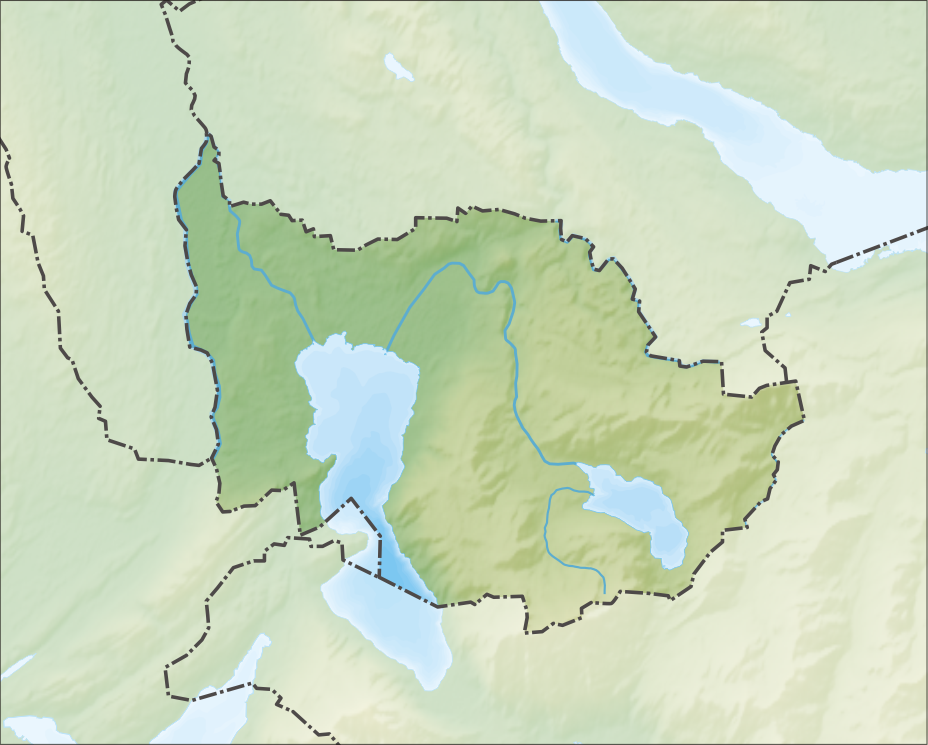
- Location within Switzerland Location within Canton of Zug
- Coordinates: 47°11′N 8°36′E
- Country: Switzerland
- Canton: Zug
- District: {{{district}}}

Area
  - Total: 27.5 km^{2} (10.6 sq mi)
- Elevation: 805 m (2,641 ft)

Population (December 2020)
  - Total: 4,540
  - Density: 165/km^{2} (428/sq mi)
- Time zone: UTC+01:00 (CET)
  - Summer (DST): UTC+02:00 (CEST)
- Postal code: 6313
- SFOS number: 1704
- ISO 3166 code: CH-ZG
- Surrounded by: Baar, Hirzel (ZH), Hütten (ZH), Neuheim, Oberägeri, Schönenberg (ZH), Unterägeri
- Website: www.menzingen.ch

Menzingen is a municipality in the canton of Zug in Switzerland.

== History ==
Aerial view (1948)

Menzingen is first mentioned around 1217-22 as Meincingin.

The traditionalist Society of Saint Pius X, a splinter group that was excommunicated by the Vatican due to its illicit consecration of bishops, is headquartered in Menzingen.

== Geography ==
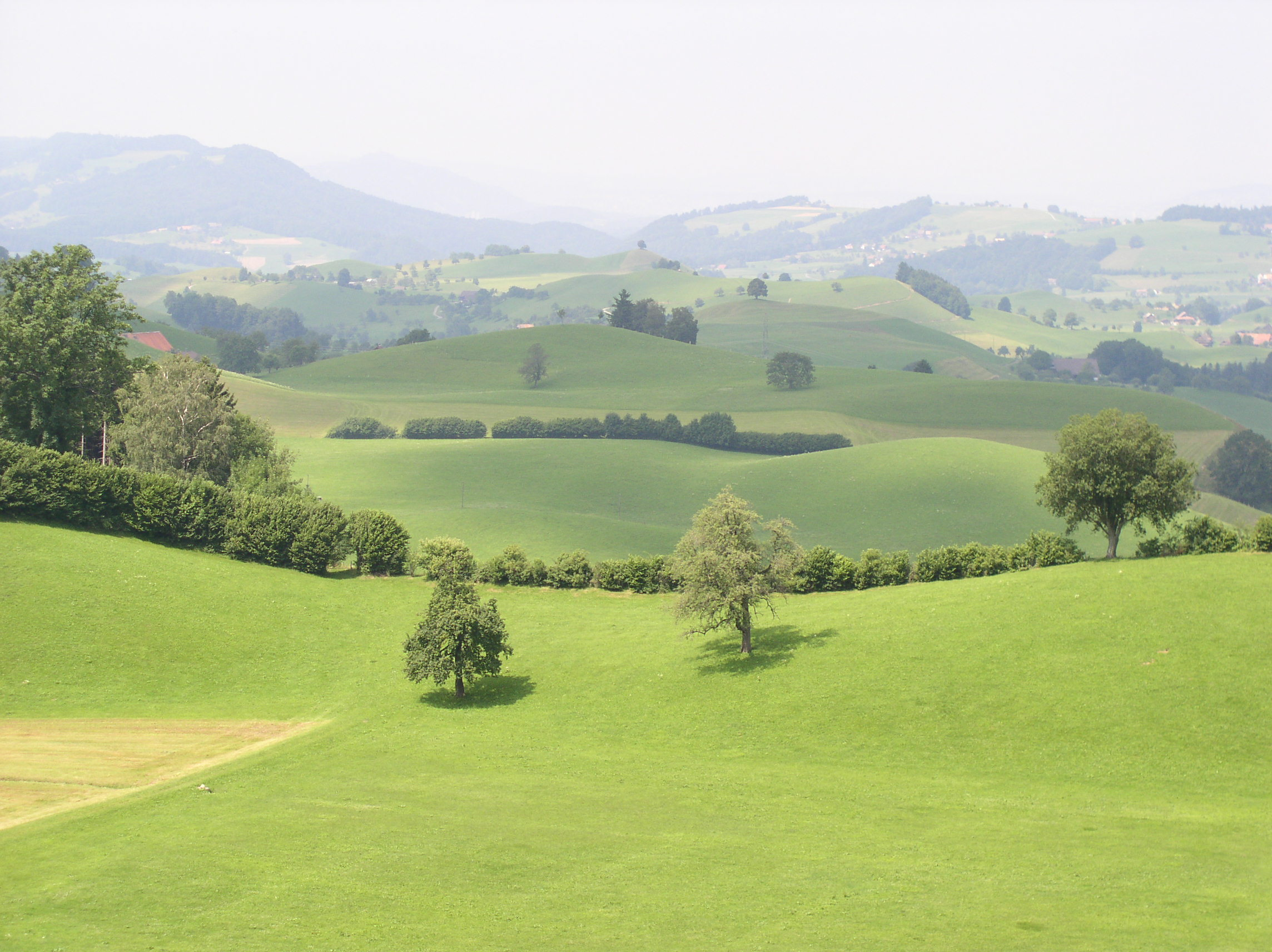
Moraine landscape

Menzingen has an area, as of 2006, of 27.5 km^{2} (10.6 sq mi). Of this area, 62.5% is used for agricultural purposes, while 28.3% is forested. Of the rest of the land, 7.6% is settled (buildings or roads) and the remainder (1.5%) is non-productive (rivers, glaciers or mountains).

The municipality is located on a moraine plateau between the Lorze and Sihl rivers at an elevation of about 800 m (2,600 ft). In 1848 the municipality of Neuheim separated from Menzingen. It consists of the village of Menzingen and a number of hamlets and individual farm houses.

It includes Edlibach and Finstersee and, until the late 1950s, was the highest destination of the then famous Zug tramways.

== Demographics ==
Menzingen has a population (as of 31 December 2020) of 4,540. As of 2007, 16.1% of the population was made up of foreign nationals. Over the last 10 years, the population has decreased at a rate of -1.6%. Most of the population (as of 2000) speaks German (88.8%), with Albanian being second most common (3.3%) and Serbo-Croatian being third (1.5%).

In the 2007 federal election, the most popular party was the SVP which received 31.6% of the vote. The next three most popular parties were the CVP (30.6%), the FDP (19.8%) and the Green Party (11.6%).

In Menzingen, about 69.3% of the population (between age 25–64) have completed either non-mandatory upper secondary education or additional higher education (either university or a Fachhochschule).

Menzingen has an unemployment rate of 1.25%. As of 2005, there were 288 people employed in the primary economic sector and about 107 businesses involved in this sector. 211 people are employed in the secondary sector and there are 37 businesses in this sector. 1,066 people are employed in the tertiary sector, with 133 businesses in this sector.

The historical population is given in the following table:

| year | population |
|---|---|
| 1743 | 1,676 |
| 1799 | 2,290 |
| 1850 | 2,113 |
| 1900 | 2,495 |
| 1950 | 3,398 |
| 2000 | 4,495 |
