= Meta Heusser-Schweizer =

Swiss poet (1797–1876)

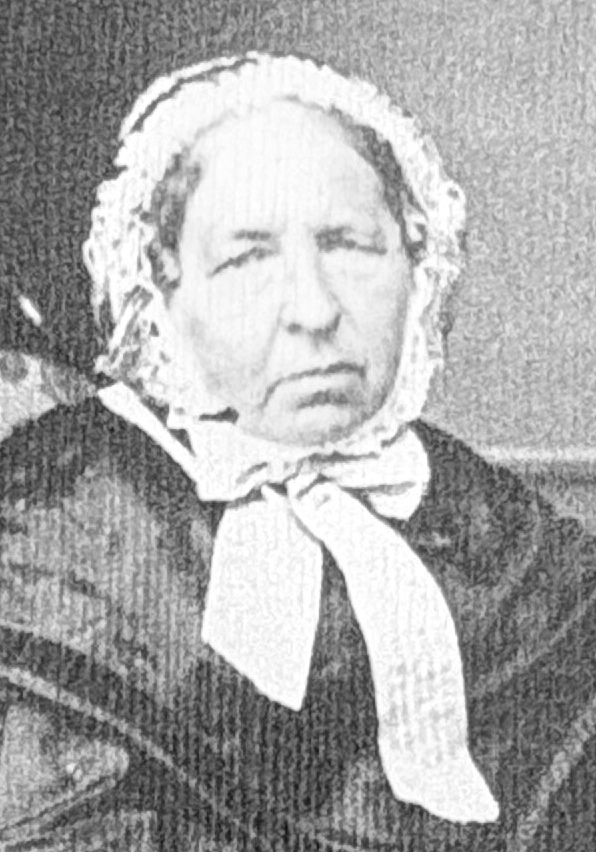
- Born: Meta Schweizer; 6 April 1797; Hirzel, Switzerland
- Died: 2 January 1876 (aged 78); Hirzel, Switzerland
- Occupation: Poet
- Spouse: Johann Jakob Heusser (m. 1821; died 1859)
- Children: 6, including Johanna Spyri
- Relatives: Georg Gessner (uncle)
- Writing career
- Movement: Württemberg Pietism

Meta Heusser-Schweizer (née Schweizer; 6 April 1797 – 2 January 1876) was a Swiss poet. Born in Hirzel as the niece of Georg Gessner, she wrote several collections of poems associated with the Württemberg Pietism movement. She was the mother of Johanna Spyri, best known for her children's novel Heidi.

== Early and personal life ==
Heusser-Schweizer was born on 6 April 1797 in Hirzel, Switzerland, to Diethelm Schweizer (1751–1824) and Anna Schweizer–Gessner (1757–1836). Through her mother, she was the niece of Georg Gessner. She was Protestant. In 1821 she married physician Johann Jakob Heusser (1783–1859), and had six children with him, among them Johanna Spyri. She died on 2 January 1876, in her birthplace of Hirzel.

== Career ==
From 1826, she participated in a local literary society known as the Dichterverein, whose membership largely consisted of regional clergymen. Her earliest poems appeared in print in 1814, and between 1833 and 1853, her poems appeared in the Christian almanac Christoterpe, where they were printed under the name Lieder einer Verborgenen. They were edited by poet Albert Knapp. Knapp later brought out a collection of these poems in 1858 under the same title. Further editions followed in 1863 and 1877, while a second series, Zweite Sammlung, appeared in 1867. After her death, both volumes were reissued together in 1898. One of her daughters arranged for an English version, Alpine Lyrics, published in 1875. Her letters with Kleophea Zahn-Schlatter were compiled as Frauenbriefe in 1862. Heusser-Schweizer's work was closely associated with Württemberg Pietism, a movement that stressed personal piety and independence from state institutions.
