= Rote Rosen am Hügel =

Volkslied in German

- Volkslied
- English: Red roses on the hill
- Text: by Johanna Spyri

"Rote Rosen am Hügel" (Red roses on the hill) is a Volkslied in German. The text was written by Johanna Spyri.

== History ==
Johanna Spyri, the author of the Heidi novels, wrote the lyrics of "Rote Rosen am Hügel". The author of the melody is not known. It appeared in several song collections.
