= Philip Schuyler Allen =

20th-century American scholar (1871–1937)

- Born: August 23, 1871; Lake Forest, Illinois, U.S.
- Died: April 27, 1937 (aged 65); Chicago, Illinois, U.S.
- Known for: German literature

Academic background
- Education: University of Chicago (BA); University of Berlin (MA)

Philip Schuyler Allen (August 23, 1871 – April 27, 1937) was an American scholar of German literature. Best known for his 1922 translation of Heidi, he was a distinguished professor of Germanic Languages and Literatures at the University of Chicago from 1894 until his death.

== Early life and education ==
Allen was born in Lake Forest, Illinois in 1871 to Lydia Reed (née Ford) and Ira Wilder Allen, the third of their four children. He was of English and Welsh heritage through his father, a lawyer from Harvard University Law School. Allen's father later dedicated himself to education, becoming a professor at Antioch College and Union Christian College before starting Allen Academy in Chicago.

Allen received a Bachelor of Arts from the University of Chicago and was a fellow there before teaching for a year at his father's academy. He completed graduate school at the University of Berlin in Germany with his elder brother Hamilton Ford Allen.

== Career ==
After returning from Berlin, Allen joined the faculty of the University of Chicago in 1894. He remained at the Department of Germanic Languages and Literatures as a distinguished professor until his death. Allen established the journal Modern Philology, serving as editor for its first five years. He also established an academy for the study of Medieval Latin and produced scholarship on the subject.

Allen translated a number of French and German works into English, including Heidi by Johanna Spyri in 1922. He produced a translation of Jules Verne's Twenty Thousand Leagues Under the Seas for Rand McNally's Windemere Series, a line of classic works aimed at young readers. In his preface to Heidi, Allen described his translation philosophy as an effort to update the language and imagery for contemporary readers, writing:

A consistent attempt has been made throughout to modernize both dialogue and description whenever this has been possible without harming the old-world flavor of the original.

Before the outbreak of World War I, he authored and edited multiple books on Germanic languages for children and young adults. Towards the end of his life, he was occupied with verse from the Middle Ages, and in particular with Charlemagne and Harun al-Rashid. He produced scholarship on Romanesque poetry and on the literary works of Heinrich Heine.

Allen died of a heart attack at his home in Chicago in 1937, aged 65.

== Personal life ==
Allen married Jessica Martha Acker, and the couple had four children. His daughter Mary Allen became a professor at H. Sophie Newcomb Memorial College, now part of Tulane University.
