= Eileen Hall =

American poet

Eileen Hall was an American poet. She was a friend of Ford Madox Ford's. She married Dr Michael Lake and her first collection - The Fountain and the Bough (1938) - is dedicated to him. After the marriage she was also known as Eileen Lake and Eileen Hall Lake.

Hall was born in Antigua; her father's family was from Oxford and her mother's family was part French and part Irish, the French side having been in the West Indies since the mid seventeenth century.

Hall travelled to Paris with her friend the painter Janice Biala. Hall's friend Willard Trask invited both women to one of Ford Madox Ford's regular Thursday afternoon salons. Ford and Biala fell in love, and stayed together until Ford's death in 1939.

== Works ==
- The Fountain and the Bough, Charles Scribner's Sons, 1938.
