= Virginia Zachert =

American psychologist (1920–2012)

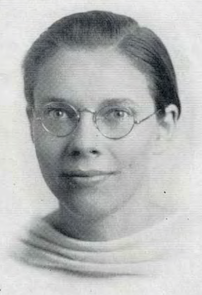
- Virginia Zachert, from the 1940 yearbook of the Georgia State Women's College
- Born: March 1, 1920; Jacksonville, Alabama
- Died: May 3, 2012 (age 92); Cuthbert, Georgia
- Occupation: Psychologist
- Relatives: Adeline Zachert (aunt)

Virginia Zachert (March 1, 1920 – May 3, 2012) was an American psychologist and professor on the faculty of the Medical College of Georgia from 1963 to 1984.

== Early life and education ==
Zachert was born in Jacksonville, Alabama, the daughter of Reinhold Edward Zachert and Cora Massee Zachert. Her father was a Russian-born Baptist clergyman. Librarian Adeline Zachert was her aunt. She earned a bachelor's degree from Georgia State Women's College in 1940. She completed a master's degree at Emory University in 1947, and a Ph.D. in psychology from Purdue University in 1949. Her dissertation was titled "A Factor Analysis of Vision Tests".

Her sister Adeline Zachert Barber was an education professor at the University of Georgia and Armstrong State College.

== Career ==
During World War II, Zachert worked as a scientist for the United States Navy. From 1949 to 1954 she was an aviation psychologist for the United States Air Force. In the late 1950s and early 1960s she worked at Western Design, designing a "teaching machine" for military use.

Zachert joined the faculty of the Medical College of Georgia in 1963, as a professor in the department of obstetrics and gynecology. She retired from the Medical College with emeritus status in 1984.

In retirement, Zachert was active on the President's Council on the Aging, the CSRA Coalition of Advocates for the Aging, and the National Silver Haired Congress, among other old-age advocacy organizations. She donated to the Baptist Seminary of Prague in honor of her parents.

== Publications ==
Zachert was an industrial psychologist, and her research involved quantitative studies of aptitude testing and programmed instruction. Her work was published in scholarly journals including Journal of Applied Psychology, Educational and Psychological Measurement, American Journal of Obstetrics and Gynecology, Academic Medicine, and Psychometrika.

- "Use of biographical inventory in the Air Force classification program" (1951, with Abraham S. Levine)
- "Comparison of Correlations Using Raw Scores and Nine-Point Standard Scores" (1952, with Abraham S. Levine)
- "Education and prediction of military school success" (1952, with Abraham S. Levine)
- "The stability of the factorial pattern of aircrew classification tests in four analyses" (1953, with Gabriel Friedman)
- Preliminary evaluation of a prototype automated technical training course (1962. with Felix F. Kopstein and Richard T. Cave)
- "Student Attitudes Toward a Programmed Course" (1964, with Preston Lea Wilds)
- Applications of Gynecologic Oncology (1967, with Preston Lea Wilds)
- "Evaluation of a Programmed Text in Six Medical Schools" (1967, with Preston Lea Wilds)
- "Programmed instruction in gynecologic cancer at the medical student level" (1968, with Preston Lea Wilds)

== Personal life and legacy ==
Zachert died in 2012, at the age of 92, survived by her friend Joyce Kephart and her sister-in-law, librarian Martha Jane Koontz Zachert. The CSRA Coalition of Advocates for the Aging named its annual Dr. Virginia Zachert Advocate of the Year Award after her in 2007.
