= Shelby Shackelford =

American painter

- Shelby Shackelford in 1957
- Born: September 27, 1899; Halifax, Virginia
- Died: August 20, 1987 (aged 87); Wellfleet, Massachusetts

Shelby Shackelford (1899–1987) was an American artist who worked mainly within the art communities of Baltimore, Maryland, and Provincetown, Massachusetts. Her paintings, drawings, and prints were abstract, but not nonobjective. Each of them had, as she said, "a beginning in a visual experience". Early in her career, during a period when many in Baltimore were hostile to what locals called "advanced" trends in art, her paintings were stigmatized as "meaningless stuff". After helping to counteract these local prejudices, she embarked on a long period of experimentation in media and technique, maintaining, as she wrote in 1957, that painting was, "an adventure, a process of discovery for which there should be no end". Critics praised Shackelford for "refinement and sureness of approach and execution", "unusual and amusing arrangements of color and line", "taste and imagination", and "paintings [that] are abstract, well-constructed, with variety of forms, and outstanding color". In addition to making art, Shackelford taught art classes to children and adults, was an active participant in arts organizations, and both wrote and illustrated books that received extensive attention from book reviewers.

== Early life and training ==
Shackelford was born in Houston, Virginia, a community that later changed its name to Halifax. Her father having died before her first birthday, her mother brought her to Fredericksburg, Virginia where they lived with one of his cousins. Shackelford passed most of her childhood in Fredericksburg and at Stuart Hall, a private boarding school for girls in Staunton, Virginia. In 1912, she attended a boarding school in Switzerland, where she learned French and, during holidays, traveled with her mother to see galleries in Italy and Paris. Six years later, having determined to become a professional artist, she and her mother moved to Baltimore, Maryland where she enrolled as a student at the Maryland Institute School of Design, now the Maryland Institute College of Art. She disliked the school's conservatism and its "dull routine" but, nonetheless, won a scholarship there in 1920 and graduated in the spring of 1921. That fall, she exhibited at the Institute with other students. At one point during her years at the Institute, Shackelford spent a summer in the art colony at Provincetown, Massachusetts. There, working under Ross Moffett and Marguerite Zorach, she recaptured her love of painting and recommitted herself to a career as a professional artist. In 1922, she traveled to France to study under Othon Friesz and Fernand Léger in Paris. After her return to the United States, she showed four drawings in a group exhibition of student works staged by the Provincetown Art Association.

== Career in art ==
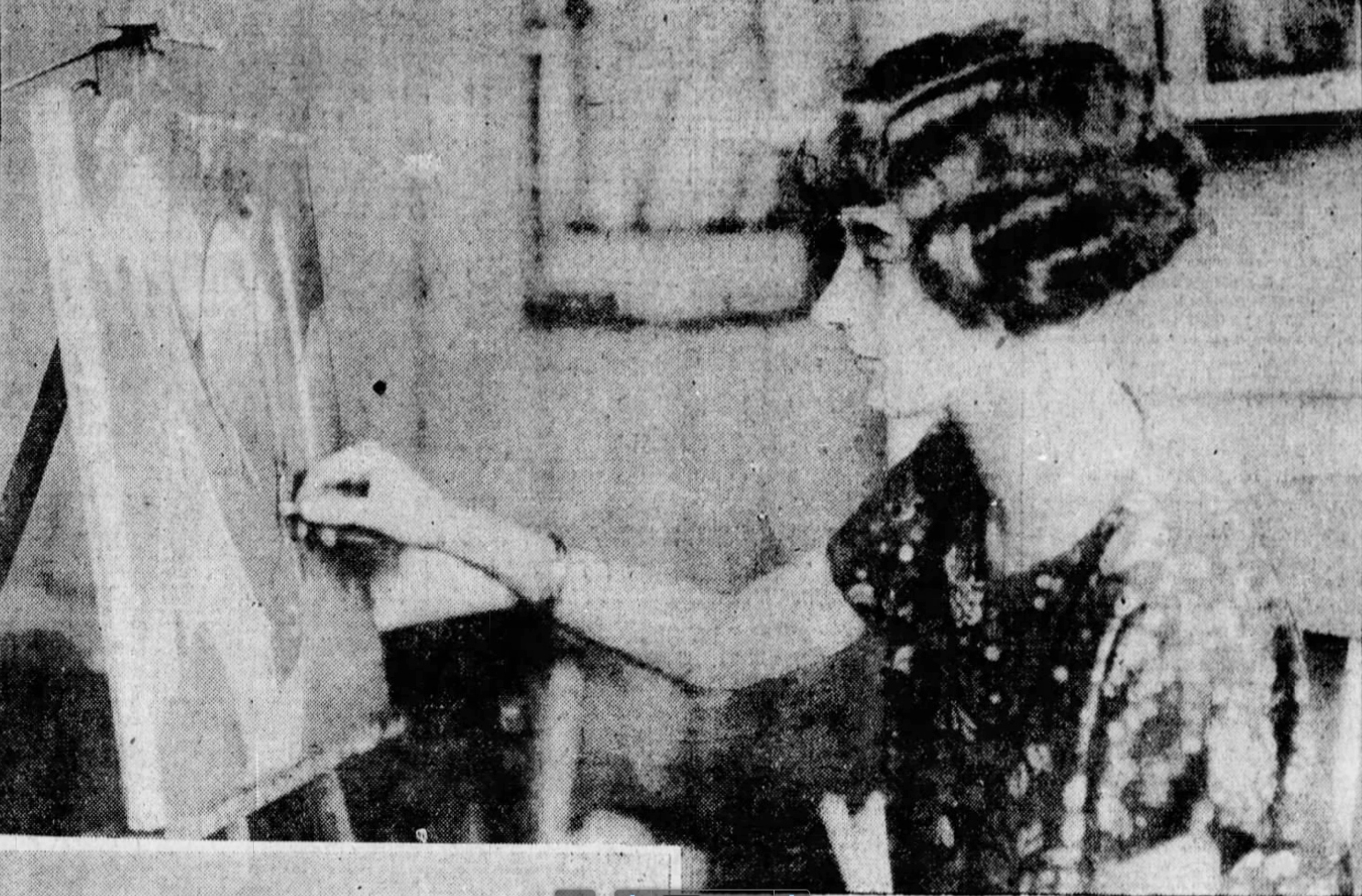
(1) News photo of Shelby Shackelford working on a painting that was shown in the 1925 Charcoal Club exhibition (Baltimore Sun, January 8, 1925, p. 7)

(2) Shelby Shackelford, Othello's Last Scene, about 1929, woodcut, 7 1/2 x 5 inches

(3) Shelby Shackelford, Cliff Wall, 1956, 12 1/2 x 9 3/4 inches

My style has changed throughout my painting span, but always I think, because of the effort to do my own seeing. I have felt influences from the work of other painters, but I have known they were to be considered, not copied. I paint slowly, as a rule, and keep several canvases going, on which I paint for months. Occasionally I may repaint a whole canvas in two or three days, having learned through trial and error what I wanted to achieve. I build up my compositions into a sort of architectural understructure. Much of this is lost, as is the framing of buildings when the building is completed. Like any artist, I am concerned with the balance of form and color, and I am continually surprised by the beauty of line, and the possibilities of textures.

— Shelby Shackelford, Personal statement contributed to a round-table discussion of "Art and the Creative Mind", Institute of Psychiatry, University of Maryland, Baltimore, 1957.

Over the wide range of subjects selected by Miss Shackelford a lively intelligence plays constantly: in her separate works there is a vision of a part of the world, unified, clear, intense. And art, if it is to be something more than an escape and if it is to provide a purpose other than that of being pursued by collectors and chortled over by cliques, needs intelligence and vision — needs them if as in the high standing words of Paul Gaultier it really is 'a harmonious and integral expansion of all our nature in the faculty of feeling.' (Note: Quoted from Le sens de l'art: sa nature, son rôle, sa valeur by Paul Gaultier and Émile Boutroux (Librairie Hachette, Paris, 1907), translated as The meaning of art, its nature, rôle, and value (G. Allen & Co., London, 1913), translated by H. Baldwin and E. Baldwin, p. 25.) 'I try to see my subject and to paint it as I feel it at that time', says Miss Shackelford. And she has done both in an uncommonly fine fashion.

— Exhibition of Paintings; Canvases and Wood Block Prints by Miss Shelby Shakelford on View at West Eager Street Studio, Baltimore Sun, December 20, 1925, page 6.

By 1924, Shackelford had decided to adopt the modernist style she had learned while studying in Paris and Provincetown. At year's end, she showed two paintings in a group exhibition held by the Charcoal Club of Baltimore. The club's annual all-American exhibition is said to have then been "the high point of Baltimore's brief art season" and her paintings were among only 70 works selected from among submissions by 130 artists. A local reporter noted that many "modernist" submissions had been rejected. The Baltimore Sun printed a photo of Shackelford working on one of the two paintings she exhibited. The photo is shown above, no. 1.

Her modernist style caused a minor scandal the following year when the newly-appointed director of the Maryland Institute rejected a solo exhibition of her paintings saying "I am not going to allow modernists to display their meaningless stuff in the galleries of the school and counteract the true art education we are giving." In response to this rejection, Shackelford called together a group of artists and art patrons. Under the leadership of George Boas, a Johns Hopkins philosophy professor, the group set up a temporary gallery, called the Modernists' Art Gallery. In 1925, she held a solo exhibition at the new gallery. A Baltimore critic said the show was, "one of the city's most important art events of recent years." The critic went on to say, "Miss Shackelford's work is important because it is 'alive' because it shows the results in painting of an eager, sensitive and well-equipped intelligence and because, more than the work of any other artist who has exhibited here recently, it succeeds in a combination, a fusing not only of color and line, design and interpretation but of matter and form." A year later, the modernist group reported that it had achieved its goals and closed the gallery.

Shackelford showed paintings at an exhibition held by the Society of Independent Artists at New York's Waldorf Astoria in February 1925, including a self-portrait that a Baltimore critic believed to be daringly modern.

In the early 1920s, Shackelford became a summer resident in Provincetown and began to show her paintings and drawings in the Provincetown Art Association's annual exhibitions. In 1925, she had a painting called "Composition" selected for the eleventh annual exhibition and the following year, she began to show in a new series of modern exhibitions that the association held. In 1927, she showed pencil drawings in the first of the modern exhibits. One of these drawings may have been a portrait of her close friend, Janice Biala (Note: The friendship shared by Biala and Shackelford was a close one. Although rarely in the same city at the same time, they exchanged letters throughout their lives. Biala's pet name for Shackelford was Dushenka, Darling.) In 1928, She exhibited a painting called "Accordion Player", showing a figure said to be "at once vigorous and lax in his posture". Between 1930 and 1936, her paintings and drawings appeared in the annual modern shows and in 1932 and 1933 she was a member of the jury that selected works for exhibition.

Following her marriage in 1926, Shackelford and her husband moved to New York City where he held a teaching position. In 1930, 1931, and 1932, she exhibited drawings and paintings at a nonprofit gallery founded by the wife of Philip Roosevelt and named the G.R.D. Gallery in honor of the artist, Gladys R. Dick. During this period, she also showed in group exhibitions at New York commercial galleries (Macy's Department Store, 1931, and Contemporary Art Galleries, 1933). These shows elicited praise from local critics. One praised a combination of force and delicacy in her drawings. Another called attention to "unusual and amusing arrangements of color and line decidedly well painted."

Shackelford learned printmaking during her summers in Provincetown. In 1930, 1931, and 1932, she had prints accepted for display in the prestigious traveling exhibition called "Fifty Prints of the Year". Sponsored by the American Institute of Graphic Arts, this annual series began in 1925. Each show included prints by both modern and traditional printmakers and the Institute took steps to ensure that the selection process was fair to both groups. The woodblock print, "Othello's Last Scene" (shown above, no. 2), appeared in the 1930 exhibition.

In what may have been her last exhibition in New York before the outbreak of World War II, Shackelford showed prints and drawings in the second biennial exhibition at the Whitney Museum of American Art in 1936. During the war, she and her husband moved back to Baltimore. In the late 1940s, she continued painting and printmaking and renewed her connections with the city's arts organizations. Beginning in 1946 and continuing into the mid-1960s, she participated in group exhibitions at the Baltimore Museum of Art and regional non-profit organizations. These included a group shows at the Baltimore Museum in 1946, 1950, and 1962; solo exhibitions at that museum in 1956, at Western Maryland College in 1958, and at Johns Hopkins University in 1963; and a special invitational show of seven Maryland artists held in Annapolis by the State Federation of Arts in 1965. Shackelford's painting called "Cliff Wall" of 1956 (shown above, no. 3) is from this period.

I have been asked a number of times, "How do you begin a painting?" I know very well how I do not begin. I do not set up an easel and paint what is in front of me. How I begin is far more tentative. I think it starts with a feeling which I want to make visible. Sometimes it takes me a long time to "see" this within my own mind; sometimes it comes quickly. It may be started by color sensations from trees, hills, skies, water, streets — anything. It may be in the shape of small objects, stones, shells, feathers. Almost always the stimulus comes from outside, from the visual world around me. I was recently called "a nature painter." This is true, in that the beginning of my subject matter is nature. What I do with it, or a small part of it, becomes my own translation.

— Shelby Shackelford, Personal statement contributed to a round-table discussion of "Art and the Creative Mind", Institute of Psychiatry, University of Maryland, Baltimore, 1957.

In 1957, Shackelford became a member of a newly-formed artists' cooperative gallery—the Jefferson Place Gallery—in Washington, D.C. Her exhibitions at the gallery included eight group shows between 1957 and 1960 as well as a solo show in 1958. Washington critics gave favorable reviews. One said a painting of hers was the "most covetable" of the works shown in a group exhibition in 1958. Another singled out a painting called "Phoenix" in a 1960 group show, noting its "feathery flame-like forms and harmonious colors" and calling it "the show's gem".

In 1960, she won second prize in a competition sponsored by the Baltimore Jewish Community Center, and in 1962 she won first prize in the annual Maryland Artists Exhibition of the Baltimore Museum of art. In 1967, she gave a solo exhibition at Studio North gallery in Towson, Maryland that contained conventional ink drawings along with ones made by mixing soot in water and a year later she showed further experimental techniques in a group exhibition at that gallery. During this period, she also participated in an innovative group exhibition at Baltimore Junior College, contributed paintings to art rental program she had helped to establish at the Baltimore Museum of Art, and showed drawings, prints, and paintings in a variety of group exhibitions at academic and nonprofit galleries.

Shackelford continued to show even after she turned 75. Regarding an exhibition in which she participated with five other artists that was held at the Fells Point Gallery in Baltimore, a critic for the Baltimore Sun wrote, "Shelby Shackelford, in delicate drawings, invests a variety of mineral specimens with mystery and, in the painting, "Part of This Sphere" endows inanimate nature with a feeling of passionate life." In 1982, she was given a solo show of paintings and drawings at the Provincetown Art Association and Museum and in 1985 she participated in a group show at the National Council on Aging. When interviewed about the latter, she said her work had been affected by " cataract operations, arthritis, and two hip replacements". She added, however, that her health had improved and said she was "anxious to work" and was "feeling happier all the time."

=== Artistic style ===
Shackelford used a variety of media during her long career. Her earliest works were oil on canvas, graphite and ink on paper, and woodblock prints on paper. Later in her career, she also painted using casein, made wax and paraffin prints, and used soot as a medium in her drawings. In 1956, a critic noted that she liked the ease of handling casein as well as its pure color. "After the medium is dry", this critic wrote, "she uses a light wax finish to produce a preserved and luminous quality."

She made portraits and other figures, landscapes, still lifes, and mixed media.

She was seen from the first as an abstract artist and her work became more abstract as her career progressed but it was never purely abstract. In 1957 she said, "My painting has become more abstract, more concerned with the fact of the flat surface of my canvas and the consistency of my paints. I am not a nonobjective painter, as my canvases always have a beginning in a visual experience."

In an early consideration of her use of abstraction, a critic said, "Miss Shackelford is 'modern' but that means largely that she is an artist. For the understanding observer there should be no strangeness in her paintings and no need to hunt for symbolism. In virtually all these canvases one can find what always have been the elements of real art." This critic noted skill in handling a "definite rhythm of composition", her ability to achieve a "harmony of colors", and her "precision of method" and called attention to the expressiveness in her works. Of one painting showing figures in a landscape the critic wrote, "Miss Shackelford has taken the ordinary elements of sky, land, men and women and made them something more, given them spirit and a concentrated life different from that of any one of them and more profound because it arises from the relating and harmonizing of their individualities." The critic quotes a comment of Shackelford's on this topic: "I try to see my subject and to paint it as I feel it at that time."

In 1956, a critic discussed a change in her style that gave her paintings a greater intensity of expression. He noted that at this point in her career, she was "primarily a nature painter" and said that her use of casein had achieved a "spectral purity" in a landscape called "Green Composition". He also described her use of a new medium that involved the use of crinkled paper pasted onto the ground of some of her paintings. " A less sensitive technician could never have managed it", he wrote, "but in Miss Shackelford's painting it seems the logical next step."

Late in her career, she told reporters that she had "experimented with many techniques" and felt she was working with "greater freedom and assurance".

=== Art organization activity ===
Shackelford took a leadership role in a few arts organizations and was a member of others. She joined the Provincetown Art Association after she began spending her summers in that town. She organized the Modernist Artists Association of Baltimore in 1925. In 1943, she joined the Artists Advisory Committee of the Baltimore Museum of Art and the Artists' Guild of Baltimore. In 1947, she was a founding member of the Baltimore chapter of the Artists' Equity Association. In that year and in 1948, she chaired the Artists' Committee of the Baltimore Museum of Art. In the latter year, she submitted a letter to the editor of the Baltimore Sun explaining the operation of the Artists Advisory Committee. Consisting of representatives from local arts organizations and nine local artists named by the committee, the group was responsible for putting together a jury of selection for the exhibition of Maryland artists that was held each year at the museum. The jurors were instructed not to give preference to works by the committee's artist members. She was a founding member of the Women's Committee of the Baltimore Museum of Arts in 1952 and of the Jefferson Place Gallery in 1957.

== Art teacher ==
Shackelford began her teaching career on her return to Baltimore during World War II. She spent two years as a Red Cross volunteer teaching wounded soldiers at that city's U.S. Marine Hospital. She later wrote that the task was a rewarding one, adding that the patients "painted their own world or the one they wanted." After the war, she spent a long period teaching young children in three private schools: St. Timothy's School, Roland Park Country School, and Friends School of Baltimore. At the same time, she also taught both children's and adult classes at the Baltimore Museum of art.

== Author and book illustrator ==
Shelby Shackelford, illustration (Fig. 13) from Time, Space and Atoms (1933) showing wave diffraction in accordance with the Huygens–Fresnel principle.

In 1933, Shackelford illustrated a book by her husband: Time, Space, and Atoms by Richard T. Cox (Baltimore: The Williams & Wilkins company). The book's author was Shackelford's husband. It was published as part of a series called "Century of Progress" that aimed to present the "essential features of those fundamental sciences which are the foundation stones of modern industry". Books in the series were published during the 1933 Chicago World's Fair. The image at right (shown above on smartphones), is one of the illustrations Shackelford made for this book.

Three years later, she wrote and illustrated a children's book about the insects and other small animals found in the garden of her home. Called Now for Creatures! (1936, New York, C. Scribner's sons), it explains how caterpillars become moths or butterflies, how to tell frogs from toads, and how ants go about their busy lives. The style is informal, as if she were conversing with her son, Douglas, then seven years old.

In 1941, she wrote and illustrated a book for adults, Electric Eel Calling (New York, C. Scribner's sons). Written as a journal of an expedition led by her husband, it was, as its subtitle proclaims, "a Record of an Artist's Association with a Scientific Expedition to Study the Electric Eel at Santa Maria De Belem do Para, Brazil". In a lengthy review, a critic for the New York Times explained that the book balances scientific explanations with word portraits of "the lush vegetation, the brilliant colors of the tropics, the people and their ways". A subsequent review in the Times book review magazine says, "Much of the beguiling quality of Miss Shackelford's book is in her freshness of response, whether to scene, to personality, to ancient tale or to the movement of present life. So when the eel is pursued to a more remote habitat on the big island of Marajo she makes a delightfully pictorial story of the boat trip, the visit to the cattle ranch, the arresting individuality of the masterful lady who is the ranch owner, and the details she notices in the lives of the island folk".

== Personal life and family ==
Shackelford was born on September 27, 1899, in a village called Houston, Virginia, a place that later changed its name to Halifax. Her father was Jones Green Shackelford (1853-1900), an Episcopal minister who founded and directed a school—the Episcopal Male Academy—in Houston. He died nine months after her birth. Her mother, Anna Williams Fassmann Shackelford (1864-1940), was connected to wealthy and socially prominent families in New Orleans and Nashville. She did not remarry after the death of Jones Green and, as noted above, used some of her wealth to support Shackelford's boarding-school education during her high school years as well as her art education in Provincetown, Baltimore, and Paris. Jones Green was a widower when he married Anna and Shackelford had a step-brother, Howard Green Shackelford (1878-1935), from the first marriage. In 1926, Shackelford married Richard Threlkeld Cox (1898–1991), a physicist and amateur painter. They had two children, Richard Douglas (1928–2001) and Aylette (born 1934).

In 1975, Richard T. Cox included an appreciation of his wife in a short memoir he wrote for the Project on the History of Recent Physics in the United States of the American Institute of Physics. He said that despite her commitment to painting, printmaking, teaching, and writing, she was a "loyal wife", "devoted mother" and "attentive grandmother". In a "personal statement" written in 1957, she described her efforts to balance the competing claims of work and family: "As our children, a boy and a girl, took more of my time, I painted when they slept or made drawings of them whenever I could. I wanted a family, but for a while the painting time was very limited."

Shackelford and Cox met in Baltimore, married in her hometown in Virginia, and spent the early years of their marriage in Manhattan where he had a teaching position at New York University. In 1943, they returned to Baltimore when he was appointed professor of physics at Johns Hopkins University. They remained there the rest of her life. Shackelford died on August 20, 1987, at the summer home she shared with Cox in Wellfleet, Massachusetts.
