= Adeline Zachert =

American librarian (1876–1965)

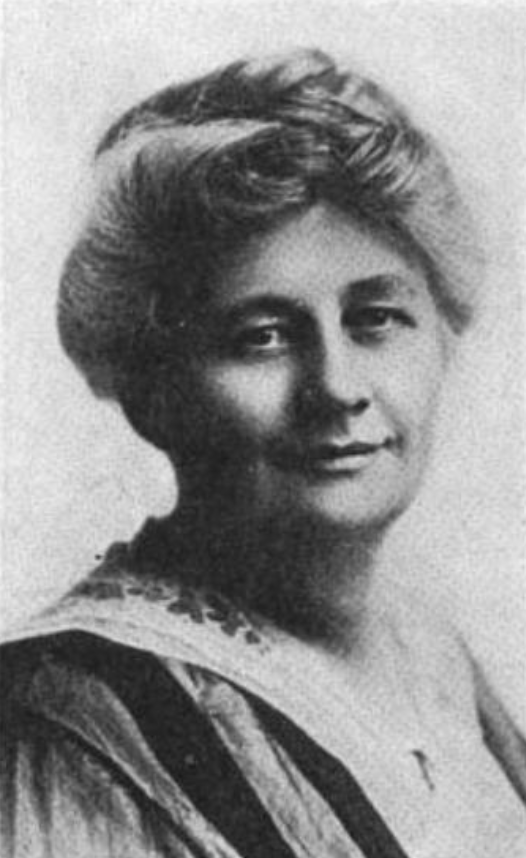
- Adeline B. Zachert, from a 1925 newspaper
- Born: November 15, 1876; Pulin, Russian Empire
- Died: August 11, 1965 (age 88); Santa Barbara, California, US
- Occupations: Librarian, clubwoman

Adeline Beth Zachert (November 15, 1876 – August 11, 1965) was a Russian-born American librarian, educator, and clubwoman. Zachert was based in Rochester, New York, for much of her career, but also worked in Kentucky, Pennsylvania, and the U. S. Virgin Islands.

== Early life and education ==
Zachert was born in Pulin in the Russian Empire (now Pulyny in Ukraine), the daughter of Edward Gustav Zachert and Wilhelmine Rushki Zachert. Her parents were born in Poland; they were Baptist missionaries in Russia. She moved to the United States with her family at the age of 12; they settled in Louisville, Kentucky.

== Career ==
Zachert was a children's librarian in Louisville in the 1900s. She was Pennsylvania's state director of school libraries in the 1920s. "Any judge of juvenile court will tell you how reading influences the adolescent boy or girl. What are we going to do about it?" she asked a New Jersey audience in 1925. She called school libraries "book laboratories" to communicate their value as dynamic, essential features of a school.

In 1920 and 1921, Zachert established three libraries in the U. S. Virgin Islands as a representative of the American Library Association and the American Red Cross. She traveled in Europe in 1938. She spoke about her work and her travels at professional meetings, and at women's community groups.

Zachert worked for much of her career in the Rochester Public Library system. She was head of children's services beginning in 1912, and worked to establish classroom libraries in the city's public schools, playgrounds, hospitals, and factories. She was acting city librarian in 1919. After working in the Virgin Islands and Pennsylvania, she returned to Rochester in 1927, and was supervisor of the extension division of the Rochester Public Library.

Zachert helped found the Business and Professional Women's Club in Rochester in 1919, and was its first chair. She moved to Santa Barbara, California in 1940, and continued active as a library speaker there. She also gave talks and collected winter clothing for Russian war relief.

== Publications ==
- "What shall we do to interesting school authorities in the value and interest of the library?" (1923)
- Preface to an English-language edition of Johanna Spyri, Heidi (1924)

== Personal life and legacy ==
Zachert died in 1965, in Santa Barbara, at the age of 88. Her niece and namesake, Adeline Zachert Barber, was a writer and educator, and worked for the American Red Cross in Japan in the 1950s. Another niece, Virginia Zachert, was a psychologist with the United States Air Force and at the Medical College of Georgia. Her nephew Edward was married to another prominent librarian, Martha Jane Koontz Zachert.
