= Heidi Grows Up =

1938 novel by Charles Tritten

- Author: Charles Tritten
- Original title: Heidi jeune fille
- Language: French
- Genre: Children's fiction
- Publication date: 1936
- Publication place: France
- English publication date: 1938
- Preceded by: Heidi
- Followed by: Au pays de Heidi

Heidi Grows Up (Heidi jeune fille), also known as Heidi Grows Up: A Sequel to Heidi, is a 1936 novel and sequel to Johanna Spyri's 1881 novel Heidi, written by Spyri's French and English translator, Charles Tritten, after a three-decade-long period of pondering what to write, since Spyri's death gave no sequel of her own. It was originally published by Flammarion in Paris (1936), and in New York by Grosset & Dunlap (1938), illustrated by Jean Coquillot.

It was followed by four more sequels: Au pays de Heidi, Heidi's Children, Heidi grand'mère and Le sourire de Heidi, of which only the second one has been translated into English.

== Plot ==
Heidi's grandfather sends her to a boarding school which has Miss Smith as the headmistress. Within a few weeks Heidi befriends most of its foreign students. Over summer break Heidi offers to take one of the students, Jamy, up onto the Alm, for the girl's parents plan to take a vacation without her. Miss Smith agrees to chaperone them.

On the Alm Jamy sees Peter and his goat herd. Peter introduces the vacationers to a little kid goat named Baerli. The next morning Heidi's grandfather agrees to let Jamy go up with Heidi and Peter to the goat pasture. Peter leads the girls to the top of a nearby peak. Most of the goats follow without difficulty, but one goat gets into a dangerous situation. Peter, Heidi and Jamy are able to rescue him.

Heidi and Jamy are sent down to the village to get supplies for Peter and his goats. While at the village it becomes so overcast with clouds that the girls end up staying at Reboux's mansion. A storm breaks, and then someone announces the grandfather's house is on fire. Heidi runs up the Alm, calling out her grandfather's name. The others run after her. They find the elderly man, with his goats, under the fir trees. The grandfather and some of the villagers rebuild the house, with many improvements. Grandfather tells Heidi and Jamy legends that excite the visitor through the rest of the summer vacation.

Heidi graduates, and is hired to teach at a local school. When the school year begins one of the students breaks a flowerpot and runs off. Peter tells Heidi he's found the child and the next day they go to a cave where the student has been staying. Heidi learns the former teacher would put troublesome children in the cave, and called it the "school dungeon".

Heidi's grandfather becomes ill, and so Jamy takes over teaching the school children. When the grandfather recovers Peter asks Heidi for her hand in marriage, and she accepts. The villagers help prepare for the wedding. Peter wears his green Sunday suit, and Jamy leads a children's choir of school students. Other wedding guests include Heidi's old friend, Klara, and Jamy's little sister, Martha.

After they marry, Heidi and Peter leave their wedding party to watch the sun sink.

== Sources ==
Charles Tritten wrote this and the three later novels primarily by adapting from Johanna Spyri's other children's stories, given their similar settings and storylines. For example, the "lost cross" and "kid goat endangered with slaughter" sub-plots, along with the Bearli incident, are adapted from the story "Moni, the Goat Boy".
