= Janice Biala =

American painter (1903–2000)

- Biala, 1956
- Born: Schenehaia Tworkovska; September 11, 1903; Biała Podlaska, Kingdom of Poland
- Died: September 23, 2000 (aged 97); Paris, France
- Partner: Ford Madox Ford
- Relatives: Jack Tworkov (brother)
- Memorials: Godwin-Ternbach Museum, Queens College, City University of New York organized an exhibition of her work, entitled Biala: Vision and Memory
- Website: janicebiala.com

Janice Biala (September 11, 1903 – September 24, 2000) was a Polish-born American artist whose work, spanning seven decades, is well regarded both in France and the United States. Her work lies between figuration and abstraction. A modernist, she transformed her subjects into shape and color using "unexpected color relationships and a relaxed approach to interpreting realism."

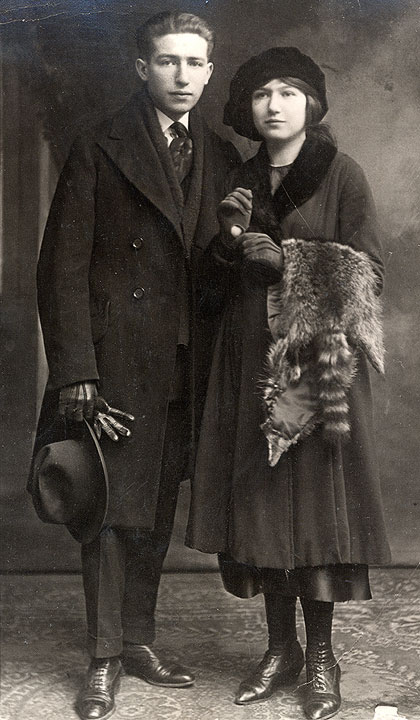
Jack Tworkov and his younger sister, Janice Biala, in a photo taken ca. 1918. Their father made the clothing they wear in this photo.

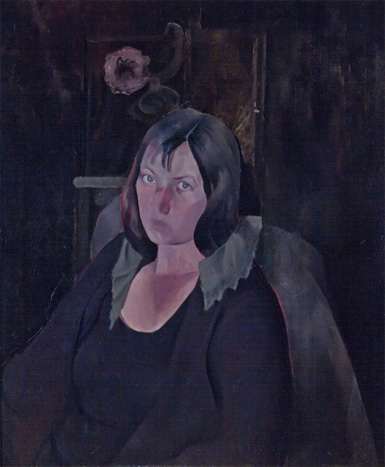
Edwin Dickinson, Portrait of Biala, née Janice Tworkov, 1924, oil on canvas, 30 × 25 inches

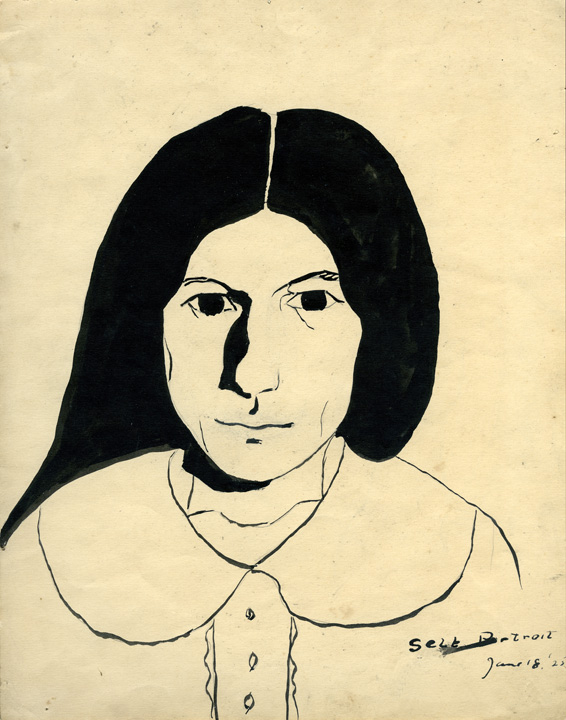
Janice Biala, untitled (self-portrait), 1925, ink on paper, 10¾ × 8½ inches

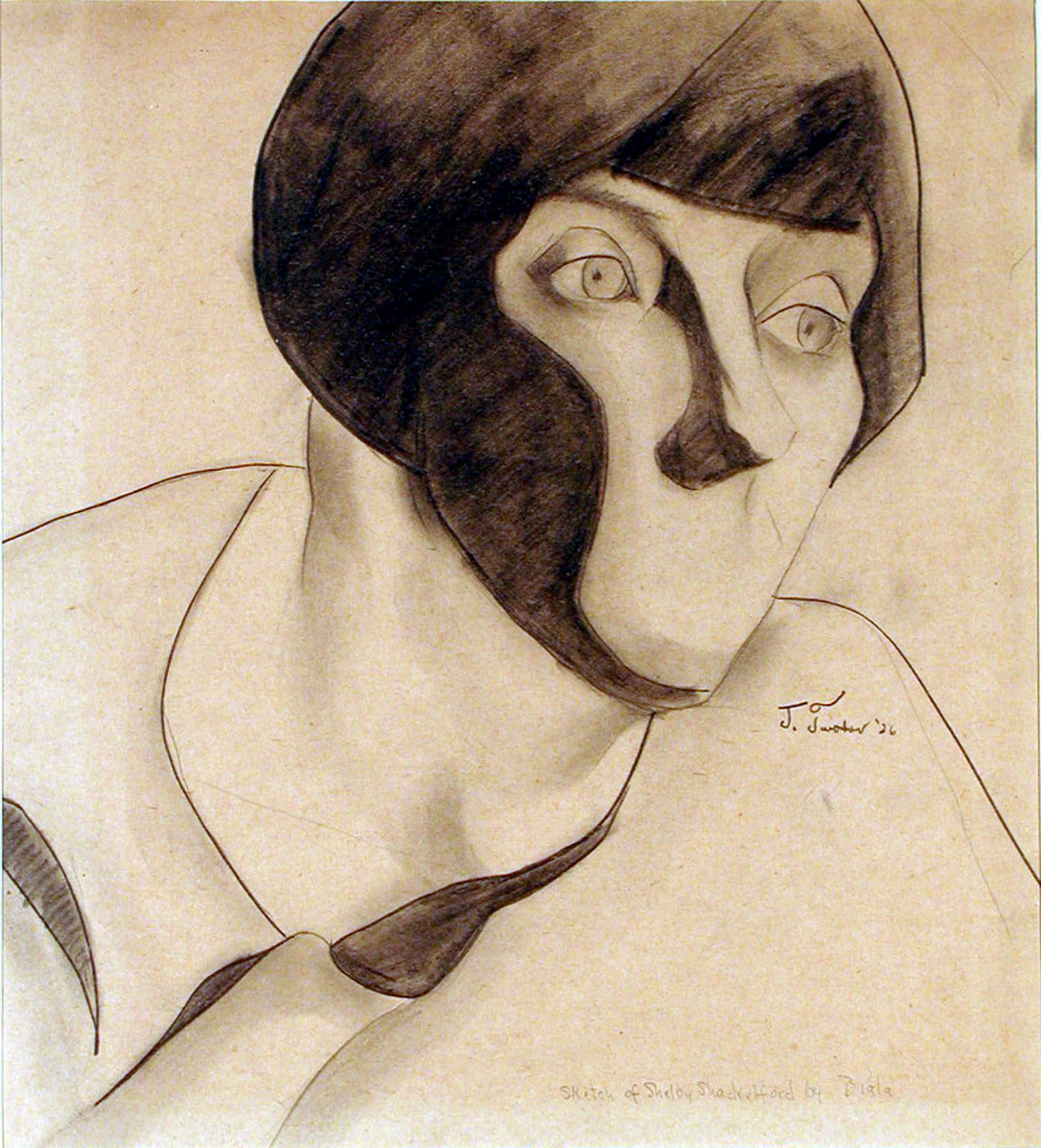
Biala's 1926 sketch of Shelby Shackelford

== Early life and education ==
In 1903 Biala was born in Biała Podlaska, a small city in the Kingdom of Poland with an important Imperial Russian garrison. Her birth name was Schenehaia Tworkovska. She immigrated to New York in 1913, arriving with her mother, Esther, and brother, Yakov (Jacob). Her father, Hyman Tworkovsky, was a tailor who had emigrated to New York earlier. Biala's parents changed their surname to Bernstein because a relative whom they listed as sponsor on their immigration documents bore that name. The family also Americanized its forenames. Biala, whose Hebrew name was Schenehaia, became Janice and Yakov became Jack. Jack would later change his surname to a simplified form of the original family name and, using that name, Jack Tworkov, would establish himself as a highly regarded painter of the New York School. Following her brother's lead, Janice Bernstein became Janice Tworkov and, in 1929, was naturalized as a U.S. citizen with that name.

Biala was educated in New York's public school system. At an early age she decided to become a professional artist and, during her high school years, she and her friends got together for informal sketching sessions. When she was twenty she enrolled in the National Academy of Design's art course where Charles Hawthorne was teaching a life drawing class. At this time she also met Hawthorne's associate, Edwin Dickinson, who was teaching a class at the Art Students League. In the summer of 1923 she convinced her brother Jack to accompany her to the artist colony in Provincetown, Massachusetts, in order to study with Hawthorne and Dickinson. During 1924 and 1925 she studied at Manhattan's Art Students League where Hawthorne was then teaching. In 1924 Dickinson made a portrait of her which shows a serious young woman, somberly dressed. Despite differences of medium and treatment, Biala's self-portrait of 1925 shows similarities of style. From Dickinson, Biala learned to focus on the essential elements of a subject, to see these elements as abstract forms on the two-dimensional plane of the canvas, and to select the color values that would become the key to the finished work. Dickinson recognized that color relationships are more important to the artist than single colors in isolation. As he did, she painted figuratively but she believed color harmonies to be more important than accurate representation of a subject. Their compositions tended toward bold, simplified shapes and were more reductively abstract and spatially flat than those of many of their contemporaries.

In 1929 and 1930 Biala participated in group shows at the G.R.D. Salon. G.R.D. was one of a few New York galleries that showed modernist paintings of both women and men. It was a non-profit gallery named in honor of Gladys Roosevelt Dick by her sister, Jean S. Roosevelt. Along with Biala's paintings, the 1929 show included works by E. Madeline Shiff, Virginia Parker, and E. Nottingham. In a review that appeared in The New York Times, Lloyd Goodrich noted her fine feeling for colors and commented that her work showed similarities to the fauvist paintings of André Derain. This remark shows prescience since it was Derain's fellow fauvist, Henri Matisse, about whom she would later write "I have always had Matisse in my belly." The 1930 show, assembled by Agnes Weinrich, contained works by Provincetown artists, including Charles Demuth, Oliver Chaffee, Karl Knaths, William and Lucy L'Engle, Niles Spencer, Marguerite and William Zorach, as well as ones by Biala and her brother Jack.

During the 1920s Biala had painted using the name Janice Tworkov. Soon after the close of the G.R.D. exhibition in February, she changed her name to Biala. She adopted the new name on advice from her friend and fellow Provincetown painter, William Zorach, in order to avoid confusion with her brother Jack. She had been supporting herself with a series of low-paying jobs and when the G.R.D. shows had not produced sales of her work she accepted an invitation from her friend, Eileen Lake to accompany her on a trip to Paris. There, on May 1, she met the author, Ford Madox Ford. Although they did not marry, the two became inseparable, living and working together until Ford's death in 1939. Less than half of Ford's age, she was vigorous, ambitious, and gradually becoming more confident in her ability as an artist. In contrast, he continued to write prolifically but his best work was behind him and his health was declining. The two of them endured dire financial straits, often raising their own vegetables in a kitchen garden attached to the villa they rented near Toulon. Biala made portraits of Ford and contributed artwork to his books. Ford incorporated versions of Biala in his writings, including a poem, "Coda," a late (1936) addition to the "buckshee" sequence of poems composed in 1932. The poem is addressed to Haïchka, the diminutive form of her Hebrew name, Schenehaia, meaning "pretty creature." It celebrates "all my past and all your promise" and it praises her for possessing a magnetic personality, always unpredictable, and for bringing vitality and productive energy to their relationship. Despite their continual struggle against poverty, they managed to maintain close contacts with writers and artists, including Gertrude Stein, Ezra Pound, Pablo Picasso, Henri Matisse, and Constantin Brâncuși.

In 1931 Biala's work appeared in New York at Macy Galleries. In this exhibition of Provincetown artists, she was identified, anachronistically, as "J. Tworkov." A year later, as Janice Ford Biala, she contributed paintings to a show called "1940" at Parc des Expositions, Paris. Reporting on this show, a New York critic, Ruth Green Harris, said "The things and figures in her painting gravely turn about as if in some slow and harmonious joy. Not a hilarious joy nor a country dance. Something much richer and more contemplative than hilarity." At this time she wrote to her brother Jack "For the first time in my life I'm convinced that I am really an artist."

In 1935 Biala was given her first solo exhibition when "Paintings of Provence by Biala" appeared at the Georgette Passedoit Gallery, New York, from April 25 to May 9. The paintings came from illustrations she prepared for Ford's book, Provence: From Minstrels to the Machine.

== Mature style ==
Along with Dickinson, Ford helped shape Biala's aesthetic vision by encouraging her spirit of experimentation, devotion to creative freedom, and the seeking of poetic truth in preference to literal facts. From both men she absorbed a passion for eliminating unnecessary detail. Dickinson emphasized areas of color, which he called "spots," as the starting point for a painting. He spoke of "two spots being pulled up together, which is, of course, necessary because there's no such thing as one color. They all exist in harmonious common relationships." In 1937 Biala enlarged upon this thought in a rare public statement on art. She said "The very first spot of paint you put on your canvas sets the note for everything that must follow. Just as in writing a novel ... no word or phrase must be there just because you happen to like it, so each spot of paint in your picture must lead up to some definite movement and must connect with every other spot of paint in the picture. Because red is not red itself, its full quality of redness only becomes apparent when it has green beside it or the full quality of green is brought out only when it has purple beside it and so forth. Then against the color you play your forms, lines, and texture." The occasion for the lecture was a visit to Olivet College in Olivet, Michigan, where Ford had been appointed writer and critic in residence. In January 1937 Biala had exhibited paintings and drawings at the Georgette Passedoit Gallery in New York. In August the show was mounted at the Denver Art Museum in Colorado, and in November she brought it to Olivet when Ford began his residency there.

She and Ford were back in France the following year where Biala was given her first French solo exhibition at Galerie Zack. That gallery presented Biala's paintings in a second one-person show in 1939. Ford died at Deauville, France, in 1939 and Biala became his literary executrix. With the outbreak of World War II, she returned to New York where she spent the next five years. In 1943 she married a fellow artist, Daniel Brustlein, an illustrator who, using the pen name "Alain," made covers for the New Yorker magazine.

In successive years between 1941 and 1945, Biala was given solo exhibitions at the Bignou Gallery in New York and by that time there could be little doubt that she had succeeded in establishing herself as a professional artist. In 1947 she and Brustlein returned to live in France where she exhibited regularly at the Galerie Jeanne Bucher. While continuing to live in France she and Brustlein returned periodically to New York. She remained close to her brother Jack and, in consequence, became one of the few female artists associated with the New York School. While not herself an abstract expressionist, Biala fostered the movement, particularly through the support she gave Willem de Kooning. In the early 1940s, she convinced her New York dealer to show some of de Kooning's paintings, Biala cared for him when he was ill, and Biala joined him in discussions at the abstract expressionist discussion group called Studio 35. Like Lee Krasner, Louise Bourgeois, Joan Mitchell, and others, Biala was not treated as an equal by the male artists of the New York School or by critics such as Harold Rosenberg. Despite her friendship with abstract expressionist artists, Biala retained a unique approach to her art in which no art movement showed dominance. As one critic put it, "she continued to paint exquisitely crafted canvases in a personal style that, even now, resists classification."

In the 1950s her work appeared frequently in solo and group exhibitions at New York's Stable Gallery and the Galerie Jeanne Bucher in Paris. Regarding a one-person show held in 1953, a critic praised the "harmonies of tone" and quality of draftsmanship in her work and said "the show is one of the most exhilarating and satisfying events of the whole season.... Miss Biala's art strikes me as the happiest result of an abstract training governed by a humane concern with the values of the world about us." Describing shows held in 1955 and 1959, critics said her paintings showed a greater freedom than they had before and one said, "Where before Miss Biala constructed with clearly organized planes—using both color and form to create recession—now her brush moves out in freedom, allowing intrinsic rhythms to spring up and subside."

== Later life and work ==
During the 1960s and for the rest of her life, Biala's work was frequently exhibited in solo and group shows. Through the 1980s many of these shows appeared in Paris at Galerie Jacob and the Salon des Réalités Nouvelles, Salles Wilson. Others appeared in New York at the Grüenebaum Gallery. In the 1990s she was given frequent solo exhibitions at the Kouros Gallery and after 2000 at the Tibor de Nagy Gallery, both in New York.

In 1981, after six decades of painting, the quality of her work was as good as ever. A critic said as much regarding her one-person show at the Grüenebaum Gallery that year. He wrote, "The Structure of her pictures often looks quite simple, ... but is not simple at all. The difficulty and complexity have been refined into lean, direct gestures and a lyrical, concentrated economy of form." Of a solo exhibition in 1989, when she was 85 years old, a critic wrote that her work showed the vigor of a person 30 years younger. "Her painting," he wrote, "is a blend of realism and fancy. In her interiors, cityscapes, landscapes and portraits, some colors and shapes hover and run; others asset themselves suddenly and then stay put, fixing space in a way that is reminiscent of Bonnard and Hofmann."

Following Biala's death in 2000, another critic said of her paintings that they "seem touched by a tough ingenuousness — never sentimental or naïve, but slightly nostalgic in their playful intimacy. Suffusing them is the outlook of a painter who has found what she needs and knows what she wants to do. The results glow with a wondrous candor." Finally, in connection with a retrospective exhibition in 2013, the show's curator told an interviewer that "Biala was a painter of impeccable taste and remarkable intelligence, She had an intuitive feeling for composition and her orchestration of color was, at times, breathtaking."

In 2016 her biography was included in the exhibition catalogue Women of Abstract Expressionism organized by the Denver Art Museum. In 2023 her work was included in the exhibition Action, Gesture, Paint: Women Artists and Global Abstraction 1940-1970 at the Whitechapel Gallery in London.

== Family life ==
In 1903 Biala was born in Biała Podlaska, a small city in eastern Poland located near the border with Russia. At that time, Biała Podlaska was within the Russian Empire. Long a trading center, the town's population then numbered about 13,000 people, half of whom—including Biala's family—were Jewish. With one exception, resources do not give the month or day of her birth. The exception is the Biala website which gives September 11 but does not indicate the source of this information.

Her father's name was Hyman and her mother's Esther. He was the son of Benjamin Tworkovsky and his wife Celia. In addition to Biala and Jack, their children were Celia, Aaron, Abraham, and Morris.

Hyman Tworkovsky was a tailor who worked for the Russian Army. He emigrated to New York some years before his wife and younger children and he worked in a tailor shop in New York's Lower East Side. The surname was changed to Bernstein to conform with the name of the sponsor. Although Biala and Jack changed their names from Bernstein to Tworkov when they became adults, Hyman and Esther retained the name Bernstein. Jack said his family's sponsor was his father's brother. He did not explain why his brother's surname was Bernstein.

During her life, Biala went by quite a few names. Her birth name in Hebrew was Schenehaia Tworkovska. After immigration, this became Janice Bernstein. As a young adult, she became Janice Tworkov (as mentioned). During the 1920s she painted under this name or J. Tworkov. In the early 1920s she married a friend of Jack's, the painter, Lee Gatch. The marriage, which was not successful, ended first in separation and then, in 1935, divorce. She did not use the names Mrs. Janice Gatch or Mrs. Lee Gatch, and was infrequently called by either name. In 1930, at the suggestion of fellow painter, William Zorach, she chose a new name so as to avoid confusion with her brother, the other J. Tworkov. She chose Biala, the name of her birthplace. In the 1930s, while living with Ford Madox Ford, she was sometimes referred to as Mrs. Ford (though they were not married) or Janice Ford Biala. After her marriage in 1942 to Daniel Brustlein, she retained Biala as her name but was occasionally called Mrs. Brustlein. On at least one occasion, she used his professional name, calling herself Janice ("Alain") Biala. In one news account she was called Janice Tworkov Ford Brustlein. She most frequently called herself Janice Biala or simply Biala but was also sometimes referred to as Janice T. Biala.

Until the 1940s Biala did not enjoy a steady income from any source. She worked odd jobs in the 1920s and her life with Ford Madox Ford was hand-to-mouth. After marrying Brustlein, however, his success in selling drawings to the New Yorker (for which he frequently produced cover art) and her growing reputation as a painter brought in gradually increasing funds and by 1953 they were able to buy a small farmhouse in Peapack, New Jersey, for their use on their return to the United States from their residence in Paris. For both of them, Paris was "home." In the 1980s Biala told an interviewer that she fell in love with France when she first travelled there in 1930: "In some ways, it reminded me of the place I was born in. And when I came to France I felt as if I had come home. I smelled the same smells of bread baking and dogs going around in a very busy way, you know, as if they knew what they were about. It really was extraordinarily human." Having been naturalized in 1929, she never gave up her U.S. citizenship and maintained that she did not "have the feeling of nationality or roots," but "always had the feeling that I belong where my easel is."

The Chronology section of the Biala website gives a full chronology of events in Biala's life.

== Public collections ==
- Art Institute of Chicago, Chicago, IL
- Brooklyn Museum
- Carnegie Museum of Art, Pittsburgh, PA
- High Museum of Art, Atlanta, GA
- Kemper Art Museum, Kansas City, MO
- Musée de Grenoble, France
- Centre Pompidou, Paris, France
- Phillips Collection, Washington, D.C.
- Provincetown Art Association and Museum, Provincetown, MA
- Smithsonian American Art Museum, Washington D.C.
- Whitney Museum of American Art, New York, NY

== Books by Biala ==
Biala furnished cover art and illustrations for some of Ford's books and, in the 1950s she wrote children's books. This list comes from the WorldCat online catalog, the Library of Congress catalog, and other sources. It is in chronological order.

- Great trade route by Ford Madox Ford, with illustrations by Biala (New York, Toronto, Oxford University Press, 1937)
- Provence: from Minstrels to the Machine by Ford Madox Ford, with illustrations by Janice Brustlein Biala (London, G. Allen & Unwin Ltd, 1938)
- It's Spring, It's Spring by Janice Biala, with illustrations by Daniel Brustlein (New York, Whittlesey House, 1956)
- Lonely Little Lady and Her Garden by Janice, illustrated by Mariana [pseud. for Marian (Mariana) F. Curtiss] (New York, Lothrop, Lee & Shepard, 1967)
- Little Bear's Sunday Breakfast by Janice, illustrated by Mariana (New York, Lothrop, Lee & Shepard, 1958)
- Minette by Janice Biala, with illustrations by Daniel Brustlein (New York, Whittlesey House, 1959)
- Angelique by Janice Brustlein, with illustrations by Roger Duvoisin (Whittlesey House/McGraw-Hill, 1960)
- Little Bear's Pancake Party by Janice, with pictures by Mariana (New York, Lothrop, Lee & Shepard, 1960)
- A Duck Called Angelique by Janice Brustlein, illustrated by Roger Duvoisin (The Bodley Head Ltd, 1962)
- Little bear's Sunday Breakfast by Janice Brustlein, illustrated by Mariana (Eau Claire, Wisconsin, Hale, 1963)
- Little Bear's Christmas by Janice Brustlein, with pictures by Mariana (New York, Lothrop, Lee & Shepard Co. 1964)
- Little Bear's Thanksgiving by Janice, illustrated by Mariana (New York, Lothrop, Lee & Shepard, 1967)
- Little Bear Marches in the St. Patrick's Day Parade by Janice Brustlein, with illustrations by Mariana (New York, Lothrop, Lee & Shepard, 1967)
- Little Bear's Pancake Party by Janice Biala (Glenview, Ill. Scott, Foresman, 1967)
- Little Bear Learns to Read the Cookbook by Janice, with illustrations by Mariana (New York, Lothrop, Lee & Shepard Co., 1969)
- Little Bear's New Year's party by Janice, illustrated by Mariana (New York, Lothrop, Lee & Shepard, 1973)
- Mr. and Mrs. Button's Wonderful Watchdogs by Janice Brustlein, illustrated by Roger Duvoisin (William Morrow & Co, 1978)
