= Heidi's Children =

1939 novel by Charles Tritten

- Author: Charles Tritten
- Original title: Heidi et ses enfants
- Language: French
- Genre: Children's fiction
- Publication date: 1939
- Publication place: France
- English publication date: 1939
- Preceded by: Au pays de Heidi
- Followed by: Heidi grand'mère

Heidi's Children (Heidi et ses enfants) is a 1939 novel, the second of four sequel novels to Johanna Spyri's original Heidi series, written by Spyri's French and English translator, Charles Tritten. It was originally published in French by Flammarion in Paris in 1939, and in New York by Grosset & Dunlap in 1939.

It was preceded by Heidi Grows Up: A Sequel to Heidi and Au pays de Heidi, and followed by Heidi grand'mère and Le sourire de Heidi.

== Plot ==
Heidi is happily married to Peter and expecting her first child. Her friend from school, Jeanne-Marie (Jamy) is still teaching at the local school and living with them in the doctor's house in Dorfli. A letter from Jamy's younger sister, Marta, prompts her to ask Heidi if the young girl can stay with them. Her parents are struggling to cope with her emotional outbursts, which have increased in frequency and severity since the death of Marta and Jamy's grandmother, and Jamy feels that if anyone can help her, it will be Heidi.

Heidi, of course, agrees and Marta travels to Dorfli. A fearful, timid child, Marta struggles to fit into the simple Swiss peasant lifestyle. She is afraid of the stern Alm-Uncle but slowly grows to love him as he helps her with her studies. The Uncle is getting older and begins to fade. He speaks sometimes of his former life, but many mysteries still surround his past, particularly with regards the identity of his wife, Heidi's grandmother.

As the strawberries blossom, Heidi gives birth to not just one child, but twins - a boy and girl that are named Tobias and Marta, at the grandfather's suggestion. Tobi and Martali are doted on by everyone, including Marta.

Marta learns many lessons while in Dorfli. On one memorable occasion, she goes strawberry picking with some girls from school. Heidi tells her to copy the others, as she was worried she would not know what to do. The Uncle misses Marta and when Heidi tells him she has gone strawberry picking, he looks forward to the taste of the sweet berries. When Marta has still not returned home by nightfall, everyone is getting worried. She turns up happily some time later, having gone down to Maienfield with the others to sell her berries. The Uncle is furious and angrily tells Marta she is just like her grandmother, obsessed with money. He tells Marta to bite the coin and see if it tastes as sweet as the berries.

The Uncle sadly dies not long after this. At the time of his death, Marta is in the garden with the babies and imagines that she can see a great hand reaching down from the sky. Heidi gives her a small package that has been left for her by the Uncle, but when Marta opens it, the package is empty. Her faith is completely shaken and her behaviour starts to revert. Things are not improved by a visit from Marta and Jamy's parents. Marta is terrified they have come to take her home.

While everyone is welcoming Marta's parents, the children make a discovery in the garden. They find half of a gold cross that is the other half to a locket that was handed down from Marta's grandmother. This is the item that was in the package left by the Uncle and it is engraved with the letter TH - MK - Tobias Halm and Marta Kruse.

The grandfather's story unfolds. He was an Austrian who met and married Jamy and Marta's grandmother, but she was used to fine things and a rich lifestyle that he could not maintain. He did everything he could to make his wife happy, but she left him and went home to her parents, taking their baby son - Jamy and Marta's father - with her. The older son - Heidi's father - stayed with the Uncle. Heidi and Jamy are delighted to discover they are cousins and the reunited family celebrates, although Marta does not understand.

Marta is given permission to remain with Heidi and Peter. They move up to the chalet on the Alm over the summer where Peter sets up a cheese factory. Jamy goes with her parents to Vaud where she marries Max, a local geologist she met through them, but Marta is still not happy, as she constantly fears that the hand will reach down once more and snatch away those she loves.

In an effort to help, Heidi takes Marta on a hike to her "enchanted garden". She tells Marta the Uncle's story and she finally understands. On their return to the chalet, they discover that Martali is missing. Despite the growing darkness, Marta sets out to find the little girl. After hours of searching the mountainside, she takes refuge under Rainy Day Rock where she finds Martali asleep. Martali gets scared and starts to scream. In trying to calm her, Marta has a realisation of how difficult she must have been for her mother to deal with, and it leads her to decide to go and stay with her parents for the summer.
