= Georg Gessner =

Swiss theologian (1765–1843)

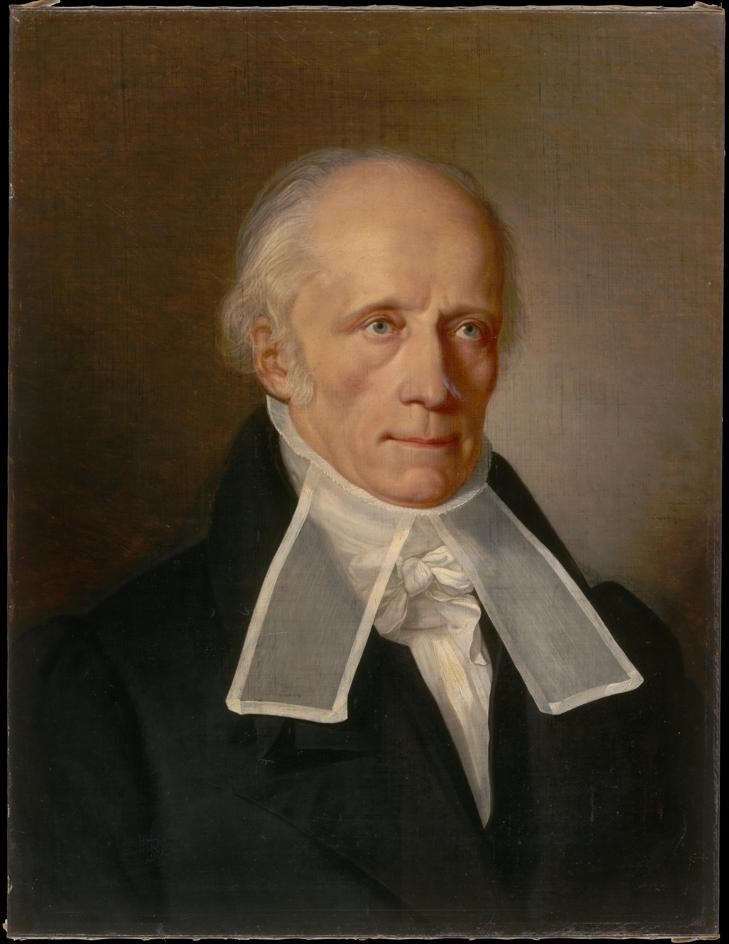
- Born: 11 March 1765; Dübendorf, Old Swiss Confederacy
- Died: 28 July 1843 (aged 78); Zurich, Switzerland
- Occupations: Theologian; pastor
- Spouses: Barbara Schulthess (m. 1791) Anna Lavater (m. 1795)
- Parents: Johann Kaspar Gessner (father); Elisabeth Keller (mother)
- Relatives: Johann Kaspar Lavater (father-in-law)

Georg Gessner (11 March 1765 – 28 July 1843) was a Swiss theologian and pastor in Zurich. He was professor of practical theology from 1799, and from 1828 pastor at the Grossmünster and antistes of the Zurich church. Besides devotional writings, he wrote a three-volume biography of his father-in-law Johann Kaspar Lavater.

== Biography ==
Georg Gessner was born on 11 March 1765 in Dübendorf, the son of Johann Kaspar Gessner, a pastor, and Elisabeth Keller. In 1791 he married Barbara Schulthess, daughter of David Schulthess, a silk manufacturer. In 1795 he married Anna Lavater, daughter of Johann Kaspar Lavater.

Gessner studied theology in Zurich. From 1787 he was a clergyman in Dübendorf and, in Zurich, at the orphanage (Waisenhaus) and at the Fraumünster. From 1799 he was professor of practical theology, and from 1828 pastor at the Grossmünster and antistes of the Zurich church.

Gessner was a popular preacher and was close to the revival movements of his time. As a member of the education council (Erziehungsrat) and of the school board (Schulherr) he was influential in church and school affairs. In 1812 he co-founded the Zurich Bible Society (Zürcher Bibelgesellschaft), and in 1819 the Mission Society (Missionsgesellschaft).

Besides numerous writings, most of them devotional, Gessner wrote a three-volume biography of his father-in-law Lavater and edited parts of Lavater's works. He died in Zurich on 28 July 1843.

== Bibliography ==
- G. Finsler, Georg Gessner, 1862
- R. Finsler, Aus den Tagebüchern von Georg Gessner, 1905
- F. W. Bautz, Biographisch-Bibliographisches Kirchenlexikon, 2, 1990, 236
