= Heidi =

1880–1881 Swiss novel by Johanna Spyri

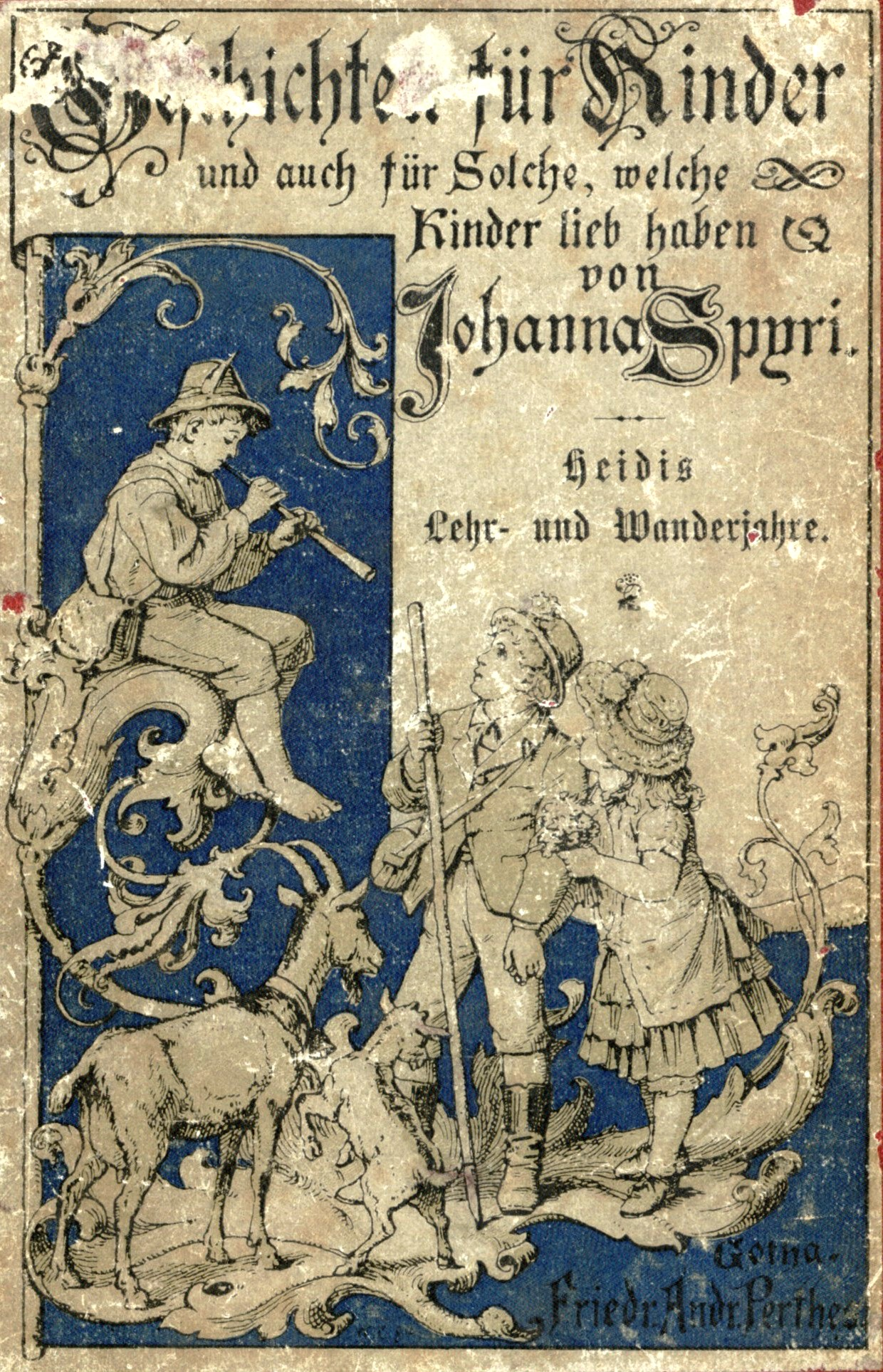
- The cover of an 1887 published edition
- Author: Johanna Spyri
- Original title: Originally published in two parts: Part 1: Heidi: Her Years of Neverending Learning, Part 2: Heidi: How She Used What She Learned
- Translator: Helen Bennett Dole
- Language: German
- Genre: Children's fiction
- Set in: 19th-century Switzerland, Frankfurt
- Publisher: Friedrich Andreas Perthes
- Publication date: 1880 (1st volume); 1881 (2nd volume)
- Publication place: Germany
- Pages: 240 + 178
- Followed by: Heidi Grows Up
- Text: Heidi at Wikisource

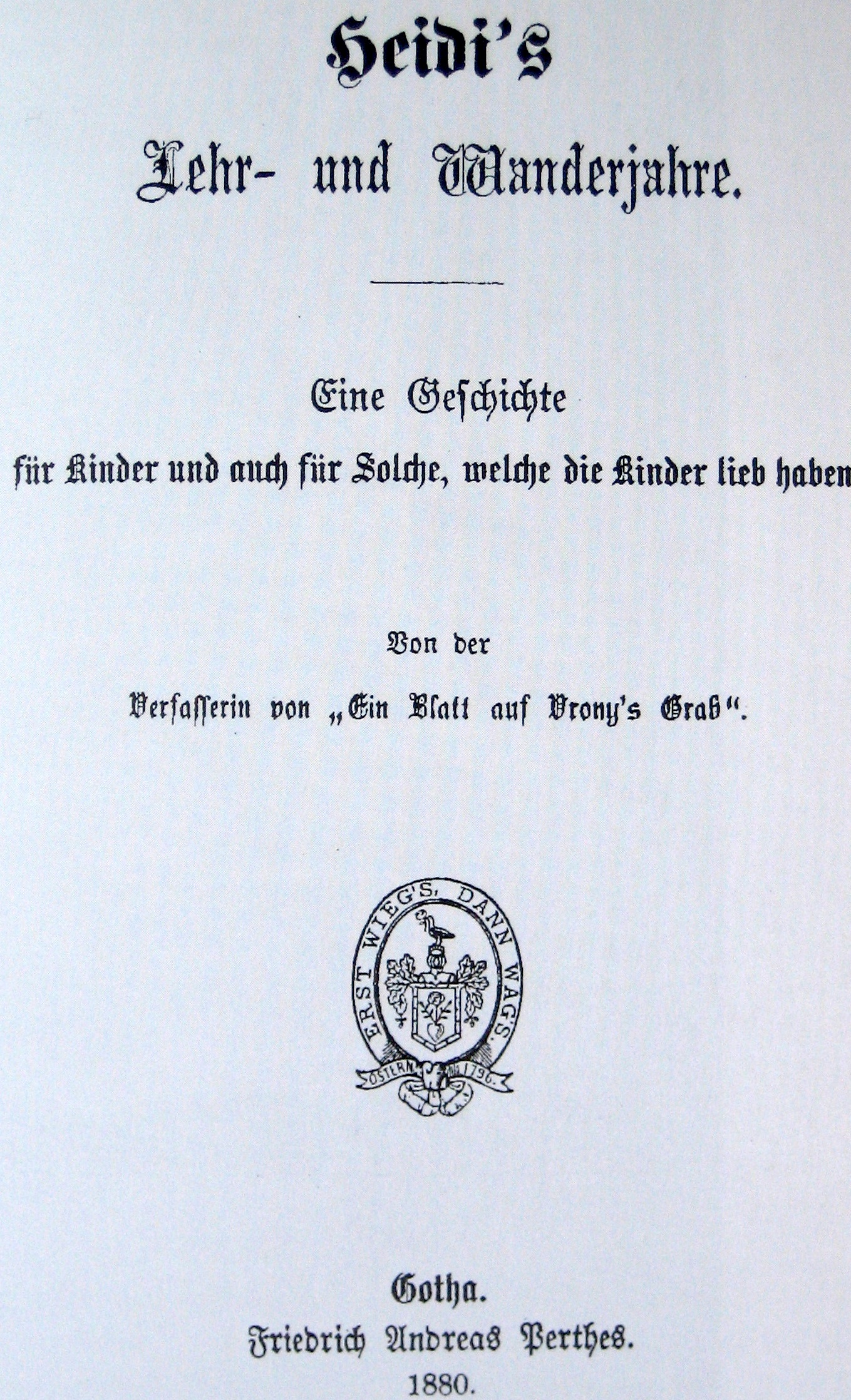
1880 first edition title page

Heidi (/ˈhaɪdi/ HY-dee, German: [ˈhaɪdi]) is a work of children's fiction published between 1880 and 1881 by Swiss author Johanna Spyri, originally published in two parts as Heidi: Her Years of Wandering and Learning (German: Heidis Lehr- und Wanderjahre) and Heidi: How She Used What She Learned (German: Heidi kann brauchen, was es gelernt hat) by the publishing house Friedrich Andreas Perthes of Gotha. It is a novel about the events in the life of a five-year-old girl in her paternal grandfather's care in the Swiss Alps. It was written as a book "for children and those who love children" (as quoted from its subtitle).

Heidi is one of the best-selling books ever written and is among the best-known works of Swiss literature.

== Plot ==
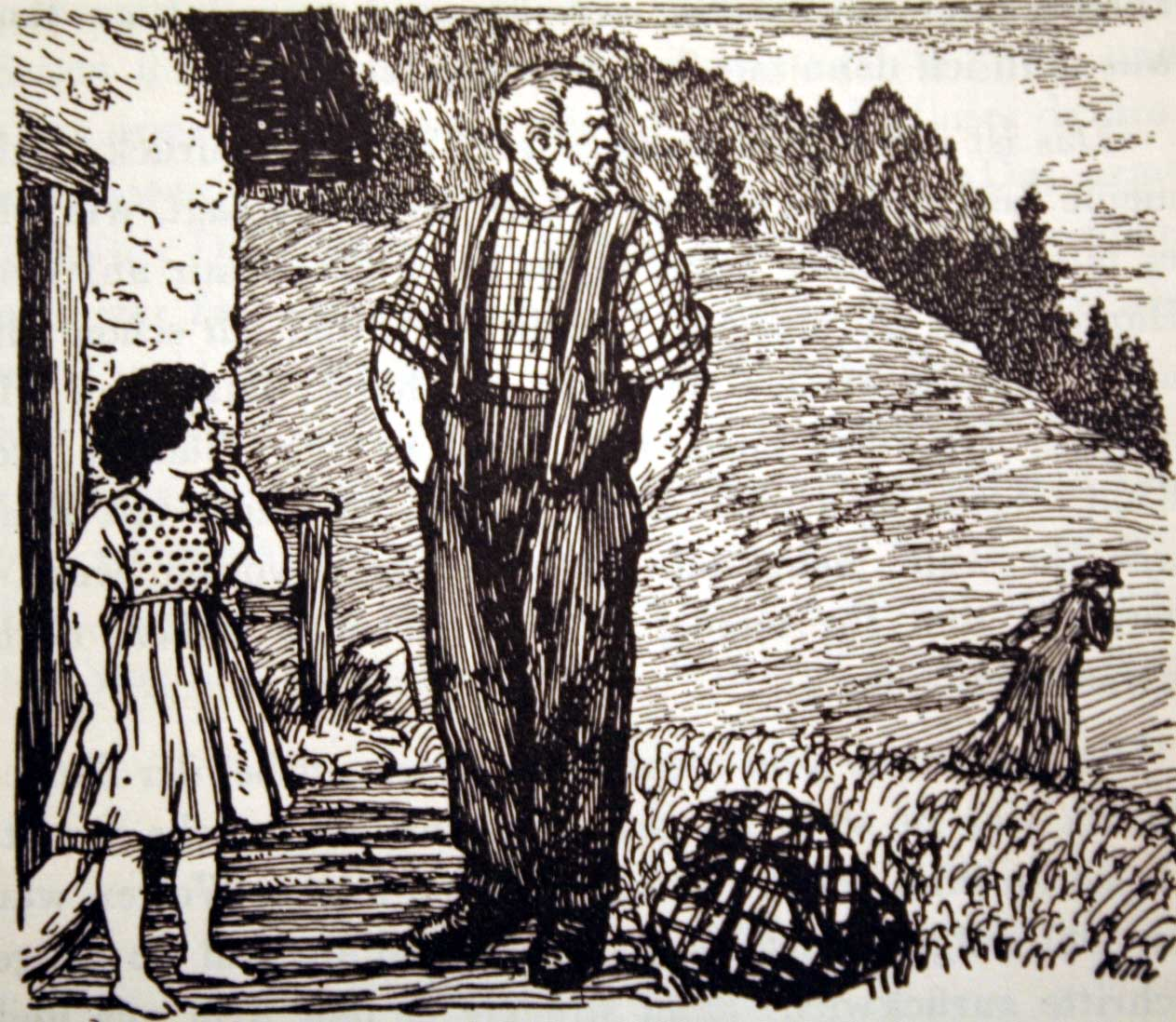
Aunt Dete hurrying away after leaving Heidi with her grandfather

Following the gambled loss of his portion of the family estate, where he ran away from home and some locals speculated he ran into service in the army of the Kingdom of the Two Sicilies in Naples, a Swiss man found the doors closed to him in his hometown of Domleschg and moves to Dörfli ('small village' in Swiss German) in the municipality of Maienfeld with his son Tobias. The villagers, wary of rumors that he had killed someone in a brawl, encourage him to reconcile with God, which makes him angry. Thus the man becomes known as the Alm-Uncle, as he lives in seclusion on the mountain alm.

Tobias grows to marry a village girl called Adelheid and has a daughter, also named Adelheid but affectionately nicknamed Heidi, and tragically both parents are killed when Heidi is a year old. The Alm-Uncle holds this against God and becomes bitter, rarely coming down the mountain from then on.

Heidi is raised by her maternal grandmother and aunt Dete in Maienfeld following the deaths of her parents. Shortly after her grandmother dies, Dete takes five-year-old Heidi to live with the Alm-Uncle so she can take advantage of a job offer. Though he is at first resentful of Dete leaving the child with him out of nowhere, Heidi's intelligence and cheerful yet unaffected demeanour quickly win her grandfather over. Heidi goes on to befriend her new neighbours: young Peter the goatherd, his mother Brigitte, and his blind maternal grandmother called Granny. Time passes and the mountaintop inhabitants, especially Peter and Granny, grow more attached to Heidi, and she to them. However, due to his past treatment by the townsfolk, the Alm-Uncle refuses to allow Heidi to attend school. He continues his refusal even after being entreated by the local pastor.

Three years later when Heidi is eight, Dete returns to forcibly take Heidi to Frankfurt to be a hired lady's companion to the wealthy invalid girl Klara Sesemann, who is unable to walk. The friendly Klara is charmed by Heidi and her descriptions of life on the Alm, and delights in all the funny mishaps brought about by Heidi's naïvety with city life, but the Sesemanns' strict housekeeper, Fräulein Rottenmeier, places the free-spirited Heidi under more and more restraint, adding to Heidi's homesickness for the Alm. Her one diversion is learning to read and write using a collection of Biblical stories, guided by Klara's kindly grandmother Frau Sesemann, who also teaches her how to pray. Heidi begins to earnestly pray to go back to Grandfather.

Heidi's homesickness leads to episodes of sleepwalking, which the household initially takes as the work of ghosts. The family doctor recommends she be sent home before she becomes seriously ill and Heidi is jubilant to learn she is being sent home to her beloved Alm.

Heidi returns to the Alm the next day, bringing presents for her friends and the book from Frau Sesemann. Everyone is overjoyed to have her back, most of all her grandfather and Peter's Granny, and she puts her new ability to read to work in reading hymns to Peter's blind grandmother, who can no longer do so for herself. Her faith in God speaks to something in the Alm-Uncle. One day Heidi reads to him "The Prodigal Son" from a book Frau Sesemann gave her. That night Alm-Uncle prays for the first time in years. He accompanies Heidi to church, and that winter takes accommodation in the village so that she can attend school.

Heidi and Klara continue to keep in touch and exchange letters. A visit by the doctor to Heidi leads him to recommend that Klara visit Heidi, believing that the mountain environment and the wholesome companionship will do her good. Klara makes the journey the next season and spends a wonderful summer with Heidi, becoming stronger on goat's milk and fresh mountain air. Peter, jealous of Heidi's and Klara's friendship, pushes her empty wheelchair down the mountain. He is soon wracked with guilt about what he did and ultimately confesses to it. Without her wheelchair, Klara has no choice but to learn to walk; she attempts to do so and is gradually successful. Her grandmother and father are overcome with joy to see Klara walking again. The Sesemann family promises to provide permanent care for Heidi, if there ever comes a time when her grandfather is no longer able to do so. The doctor makes a similar promise, and the book ends with Peter’s Grandmother encouraging Heidi to read a psalm of thanksgiving to God.

== Characters ==
- Heidi: A joyful and free-spirited young girl, orphaned as a toddler. At the beginning of the story, she is five years old. Heidi loves her grandfather (uncle Alm) and the beauty and fresh air of the mountains. Only Fräulein Rottenmeier calls her by her given name "Adelheid".
- Grandfather: Heidi's paternal grandfather and the father of Tobias, a cantankerous loner who lives in a hut high in the mountains. Called "Uncle Alm", except by Heidi.
- Adelheid: Heidi's mother; died from fever soon after Tobias died.
- Tobias: Heidi's father; killed by a falling beam in Heidi's infancy.
- Dete: Heidi's selfish and insensitive aunt, the sister of Adelheid. Heidi lived with her after her parents died. Dete is related to Grandfather (her and her sister Adelheid's great grandmother and Grandfather's grandmother were sisters).
- Peter: A goat herder who lives with his mother and grandmother in a hut up the mountain located between the village of Dörfli and the hut where Heidi's grandfather lives. He is eleven years old at the beginning of the story. He is sullen, pessimistic, and fond of Heidi to the point of insane jealousy.
- Brigitte: Peter's mother.
- Grannie: Peter's blind grandmother, to whom Heidi becomes attached.
- Klara Sesemann: A frail, crippled girl; her mother is dead and her father often travels for work. She lives in a big household with servants in Frankfurt and is twelve years old when the 8-year-old Heidi comes to live with her.
- Herr Sesemann: Klara's father, a successful businessman who travels often.
- Frau Sesemann: Called "Grandmamma" by Klara and Heidi, she is Herr Sesemann's mother and Klara's grandmother. She is a kind woman and successfully encourages Heidi to learn reading.
- Doctor Classen: Friend of Herr Sesemann.
- Fräulein Rottenmeier: The strict and arrogant housekeeper at Herr Sesemann's home who antagonizes Heidi.
- Sebastian: A dandified manservant in the Sesemann household.
- Tinette: A scornful and contemptuous maidservant in the Sesemann household.

== Translations ==
Thirteen English translations were done between 1882 and 1959, by British and American translators: Louise Brooks, Helen B. Dole, H.A. Melcon, Helene S. White, Marian Edwardes, Elisabeth P. Stork, Mabel Abbott, Philip Schuyler Allen, Shirley Watkins, M. Rosenbaum, Eileen Hall, and Joy Law. As of 2010, only the Brooks, Edwardes and Hall translations are still in print. The preface of the 1924 English translation was written by Adeline Zachert.

== Basis for Heidi ==
In April 2010, a Swiss scholar named Peter Otto Büttner, uncovered a book written in 1830 by German author Hermann Adam von Kamp entitled Adelaide: The Girl from the Alps (German: Adelaide, das Mädchen vom Alpengebirge). The two stories share many similarities in plotline and imagery. Spyri's biographer Regine Schindler said it was entirely possible that Spyri may have been familiar with the story, as she grew up in a literate household with many books.

== Adaptations ==
=== Film and television ===
About 25 film or television productions of the original story have been made. The Heidi films were popular far and wide, becoming a huge hit, and the Japanese animated series became iconic in several countries around the world. The only incarnation of the Japanese-produced animated TV series to reach the English language was a dubbed feature-length compilation film using the most pivotal episodes of the television series, released on video in the United States in 1985.

Versions of the story include:

- Heidi, a 1937 motion picture by 20th Century Fox (now 20th Century Studios) which starred Shirley Temple in the title role.
- Heidi, a 1952 film in Swiss German and German, directed by Luigi Comencini, starring Elsbeth Sigmund (filmed on location in Switzerland), and followed by a sequel, Heidi and Peter, in 1955, directed by Franz Schnyder, also starring Ms. Sigmund.
- Heidemarie S'Waisechind vo Engelberg, a 1956 Austrian film, directed by Hermann Kugelstadt.
- A Gift for Heidi (1958), by George Templeton.
- Do Phool, a 1958 Indian Hindi-language family drama film adaptation by A. R. Kardar, starring Baby Naaz in the role of Poornima (Heidi).
- Heidi (1959), music by Clay Warnick, adapted by William Friedberg with Neil Simon.
- Heidi, a six-part 1959 BBC TV series starring Sara O'Connor in the title role, with Mark Dignam as her grandfather and Lesley Judd as Klara.
- Heidi, a 1965 Austrian film, directed by Werner Jacobs.
- Heidi, a 1968 television film which starred Jennifer Edwards with Maximilian Schell, Jean Simmons and Michael Redgrave. This was the version that became notorious for interrupting an American football game that was broadcast the same day (November 17) on NBC. The game between the Oakland Raiders and the New York Jets was cut off a few minutes before the end of the game when it looked as if the Jets were going to win, but after the cutoff, the Raiders made a comeback and beat the Jets with TV viewers on the east coast missing the conclusion. TV channels displayed the final score (Oakland winning 43–32) during the film, further enraging football fans. This incident led to a policy of not ending coverage of any sports games until after their conclusion. The game has gone down in professional football lore as "The Heidi Game" or "Heidi Bowl".
- Heidi (Disneyland Storyteller Record), a 1968 old time radio–style adaptation of the story by Disneyland Records, with music by Camarata, recorded in London and starring Brenda Dunnich, John Witty and introducing (to American audiences) Ysanne Churchman as Heidi.
- Heidi, Girl of the Alps, a 1974 Japanese anime series directed by Isao Takahata for Zuiyo Eizo (later, Nippon Animation), dubbed into various languages. It was compiled into an English-dubbed film entitled The Story of Heidi.
- Heidi, a 1974 BBC adaptation starring Emma Blake.
- Heidi, a 1978 26-episode Swiss/German television series, starring Katia Polletin as the protagonist, which was dubbed into various languages, including English.
- The New Adventures of Heidi (1978), directed by Ralph Senensky.
- Heidi: La marveilleuse histoire d'une fille de la montagne (2 record set). Story read by actress Irène Vidy, Heidi theme song sung by Tony Schmitt. Milan Entertainment, a product of Activ-Records, Altendorf, Schwyz Switzerland, 1980 (SLP 77).
- Heidi's Song, a 1982 American animated film produced by Hanna-Barbera.
- Climb a Tall Mountain, a Christian film from 1987 that uses the story's characters to illustrate a message about the importance of love and forgiveness.
- Courage Mountain, a 1990 American adventure drama film and serves as a sequel to Johanna Spyri's novel Heidi, directed by Christopher Leitch.
- Heidi, a 1992 video-art project directed by Paul McCarthy and Mike Kelley as a collaboration project.
- Heidi, a two-part American television miniseries from 1993, starring Noley Thornton as Heidi. Co-stars included Jane Seymour as Miss Rottenmeier, Jason Robards as Grandfather and Lexi Randall as Klara.
- Heidi, a 1995 animated film.
- Heidi, a 2005 animated film.
- Heidi, a 2005 British live-action film directed by Paul Marcus, starring Irish child actress Emma Bolger in the title role, alongside Max Von Sydow and Diana Rigg.
- Heidi, a 2007 Swiss-French-Spanish-Czech television series set in modern times, starring Élodie Bollée as a teenage Heidi.
- Heidi, a 2007 French Film in which both Heidi and Peter are played by young Black female actors.
- Heidi 4 Paws, a comedic 2008 adaptation featuring talking dogs with the voice of Angela Lansbury.
- Heidi, a CGI remake of the 1974 anime series developed in 2015, made by Studio 100 Animation, the makers of Maya the Bee.
- Heidi, a 2015 Swiss live-action film directed by Alain Gsponer.
- Heidi, bienvenida a casa, a 2017 telenovela from Argentina
- Heidi (2024), a 2024 US American Christian film, directed by Lynn Moody

Two new separate upcoming German-language television productions were announced in 2025 in the context of the upcoming 200th birthday of Johanna Spyri in 2027.

=== Theatre ===
A stage musical adaptation of Heidi with book and lyrics by Francois Toerien, music by Mynie Grové and additional lyrics by Esther von Waltsleben, premiered in South Africa at the Klein Karoo National Arts Festival in 2016. Directed by Toerien with musical direction by Dawid Boverhoff, the production starred Tobie Cronjé (Rottenmeier), Dawid Minnaar (Sesemann), Albert Maritz (Grandfather), Ilse Klink (Aunt Dete), Karli Heine (Heidi), Lynelle Kenned (Klara), Dean Balie (Peter), Jill Middlekop and Marlo Minnaar. Puppets for the production were created by Hansie Visagie.

A stage musical adaptation of Heidi of the Mountain (music and lyrics by Claude Watt, book by Claude and Margaret Watt) was performed in Sidney, BC, Canada by Mountain Dream Productions, premiering in 2007 at the Charlie White Theatre, and has been performed again several times since then. The 2007 production starred Claude Watt (Grandfather), Margaret Watt (Rottenmeier), Rianne Craig (Heidi) and Katrina Brindle (Klara).

=== Computer games ===
There have been two Heidi computer games released for mobile devices, with the most recent being Heidi: Mountain Adventures. Both games are based on the Studio 100 TV series of 2015 and are aimed at young children, with educational elements and a series of mini-games.

== Heidiland ==
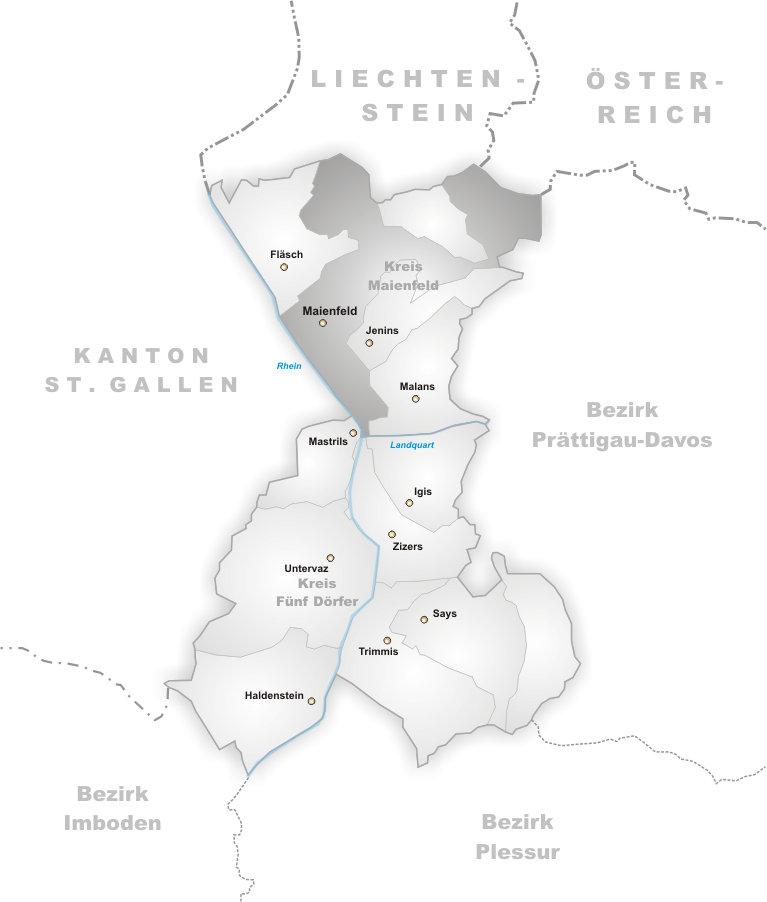
Maienfeld, the main town in Heidiland

Heidiland, named after the Heidi books, is an important tourist area in Switzerland, popular especially with Japanese and Korean tourists. Maienfeld is the center of what is called Heidiland; one of the villages, formerly called Oberrofels, is actually renamed "Heididorf". Heidiland is located in an area called Bündner Herrschaft; it is criticized as being a "laughable, infantile cliché" and "a more vivid example of hyperreality".

== Sequels ==
=== Literary ===
Between 1933 and 1955, French publishing company Flammarion published a new edition of Heidi along with a series of new original sequels. Despite being all published under Johanna Spyri's name, these books were neither written nor endorsed by Spyri, but were adapted from her other works by her French translator, Charles Tritten in the 1930s and 1940s, many years after she died, while the last one was written by Nathalie Gala. The series is composed of a total of 7 books, 2 translated from Spyri's works and 5 original. Only two of them were published in English.

1. Heidi. La merveilleuse histoire d'une fille de la montagne (1933), translation of the first Heidi volume (Heidis Lehr- und Wanderjahre).
2. Heidi grandit (1934), translation of the second Heidi volume (Heidi kann brauchen, was es gelernt hat) with the addition of an original ending by Charles Tritten, which announces Heidi's further adventures.
3. Heidi Grows Up (Heidi jeune fille, 1936) by Charles Tritten, it follows Heidi's teenage years.
4. Au pays de Heidi (1938) by Charles Tritten, the story is told from the perspective of Heidi's village seen by some of its inhabitants.
5. Heidi's Children (Heidi et ses enfants, 1939) by Charles Tritten, about Heidi's adulthood with Peter and their children.
6. Heidi grand'mère (1941) by Charles Tritten, about Heidi's later years with her grandchildren.
7. Le sourire de Heidi (1955) by Nathalie Gala, a new story set once again during Heidi's younger years.

There are some major differences between the original Heidi and the Tritten sequels. These include:

- Heidi, the original story by Spyri, shows the simple life of Heidi imbued with a deep love of children and childhood. Spyri mentioned that the work was "for children and those who love children". The sequels portray Heidi in a different manner, as she grows up and gets married.
- Heidi in the first book, Heidi, is described as having "short, black curly hair", when she is around five to eight years of age. In Heidi Grows Up, when she is fourteen, her hair is long, straight and fair.
- In some English editions of Heidi the names of the goats are translated into English (Little Swan and Little Bear), while other editions use their original Swiss-German names, Schwanli and Baerli. In Heidi Grows Up only the names Schwanli and Baerli are used.

=== Film ===
In 1990, screenwriters Weaver Webb and Fred & Mark Brogger, and director Christopher Leitch, produced Courage Mountain, starring Charlie Sheen and Juliette Caton as Heidi. Billed as a sequel to Spyri's story, the film is anachronistic in that it depicts Heidi as a teenager during World War I, despite the fact that the original novel (where Heidi is only five years old) was published in 1881.

== Reception ==
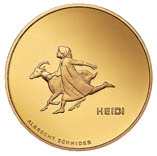
Heidi on a CHF 50 Swiss commemorative coin, 2001

The novel Heidi has long been celebrated as a classic of children's literature, praised for its evocative pastoral Alpine setting, wholesome relationships, and uplifting tone, while also drawing criticism for sentimentality, and dated portrayals of disability and recovery.

In Japan, since its first Japanese translation in 1906, the book has been influential upon the general, stereotypical image of Switzerland for the Japanese, especially its tourists, many visiting the Heidi's Village park.

== See also ==
- 2521 Heidi (an asteroid named after Heidi)
- Alpine people and culture
- Alpine transhumance (the traditional practice of moving grazing herds in the Alps between winter valleys and summer mountain pastures)
- History of the Alps
- Swiss folklore
