= Johanna Spyri =

Swiss novelist (1827–1901)

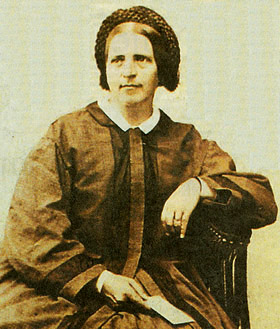
- Spyri, 1879
- Born: Johanna Louise Heusser; 12 June 1827; Hirzel, Switzerland
- Died: 7 July 1901 (aged 74); Zürich, Switzerland
- Occupations: Short story writer; novelist
- Parent: Meta Heusser-Schweizer (mother)
- Writing career
- Genres: Children's literature; adult literature
- Notable work: Heidi

Johanna Spyri (Swiss Standard German: [joˈhana ˈʃpiːri]; née Heusser [ˈhɔʏsər]; 12 June 1827 – 7 July 1901) was a Swiss author of novels, notably children's stories. She wrote the popular book Heidi. Born in Hirzel, a rural area in the canton of Zürich, as a child she spent several summers near Chur in Graubünden, the setting she later would use in her novels.

== Biography ==
Spyri was the daughter of poet Meta Heusser-Schweizer. In 1852, Johanna Heusser married a lawyer named Bernhard Spyri who introduced her to Conrad Ferdinand Meyer and Richard Wagner; the latter of which was living in Zurich as a political refugee and became friendly with them. While in she began to write about life in the country. Her first story, "A Leaf on Vrony's Grave", which deals with a woman's life of domestic violence, was published in 1873; the following years further stories for both adults and children appeared, among them the novel Heidi, which she wrote in just four weeks. Heidi tells the story of an orphan girl who lives with her grandfather in the Swiss Alps, and is famous for its vivid portrayal of the landscape.

Spyri's husband and her only child, both named Bernhard, both died in 1884. Alone, she devoted herself to charitable causes and wrote over fifty more stories before her death in 1901. She was interred in the family plot at the Sihlfeld-A Cemetery in Zürich. An icon in Switzerland, Spyri's portrait was placed on a postage stamp in 1951 and on a 20 CHF commemorative coin in 2009.

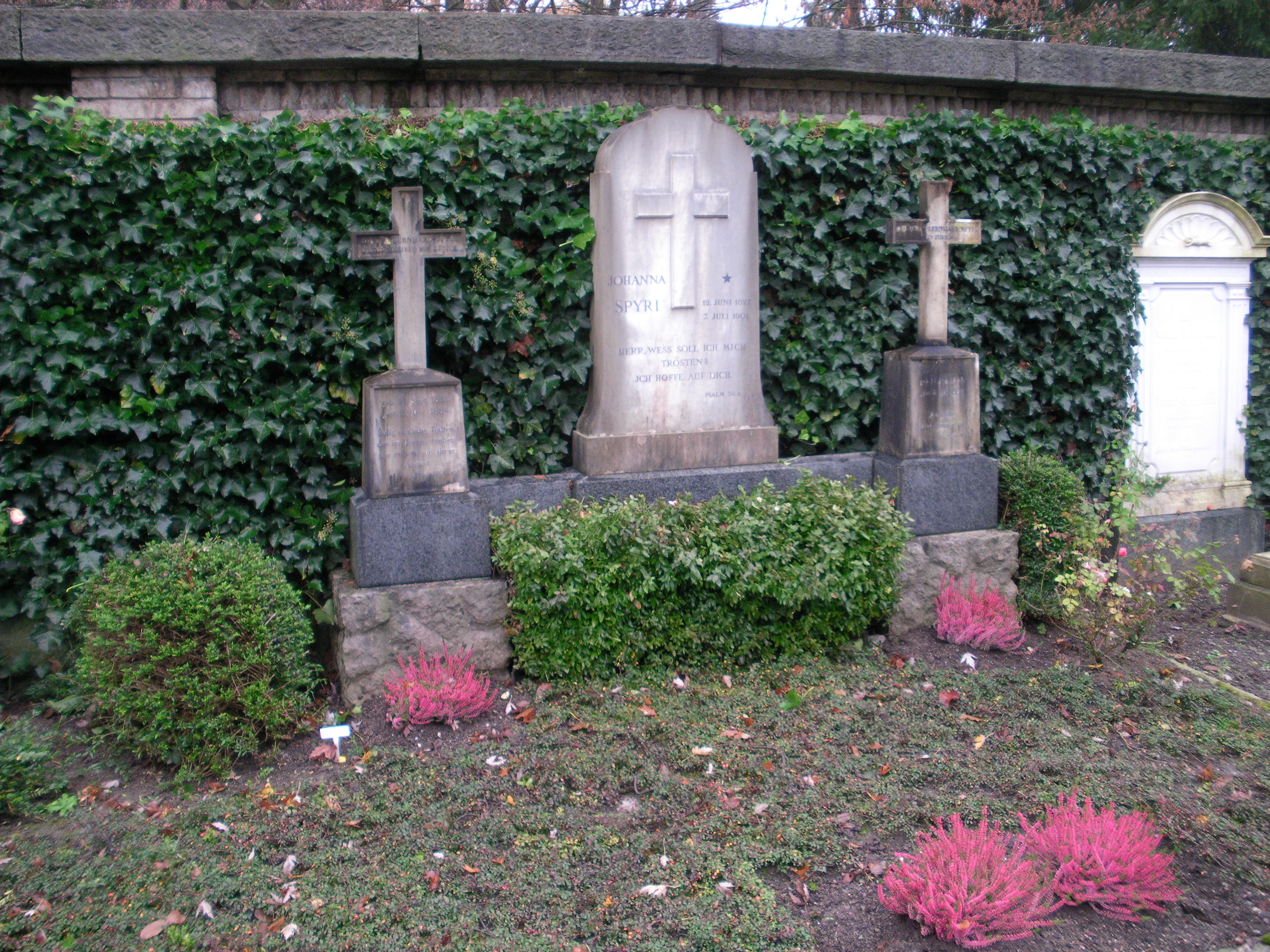
Gravesite at Sihlfeld cemetery in Zurich

Among her present-day relatives is Swiss artist and curator Andreas Heusser.

== Plagiarism claim ==
In April 2010 a professor searching for children's illustrations found a book written in 1830 by a German history teacher, Hermann Adam von Kamp, that Spyri may have used as a basis for Heidi. The 1830 story is titled Adelheide - das Mädchen vom Alpengebirge—translated, "Adelaide, the girl from the Alps". The two stories were alleged to share many similarities in plot line and imagery. Spyri biographer Regine Schindler said it was entirely possible that Johanna may have been familiar with the story as she grew up in a literate household with many books. However, the professor's claims have been examined and afterwards described as "unscientific", due to superficial coincidences and the many differences in the stories. The "Swiss disease" of homesickness was a common trope in fiction in the eighteenth (nineteenth in the article) century. Characters in "Heidi" are either drastically different or not in "Adelaide" at all.

== Bibliography ==
The following is a list of her main books:

- Heimatlos: Two stories for children, and for those who love children (1877)
- Heidi (1880-81)
- The Story of Rico (1882)
- Uncle Titus and His Visit to the Country (1883)
- Gritli's Children (1883-84)
- Rico and Wiseli (1885)
- Veronica And Other Friends (1886)
- What Sami Sings with the Birds (1887)
- Toni, the Little Woodcarver (1890)
- Cornelli (1890)
- Erick and Sally (1891)
- Mäzli (1891)
- Vinzi: A Story of the Swiss Alps (1892)
- Moni the Goat-Boy (1897)
- Little Miss Grasshopper (1898)

Her books were originally written in German. The translations into English at the end of the 19th century, or the early 1900s, mention H. A. Melcon (1839–1910), Maria Louise Kirk (1860–1938), Emma Stelter Hopkins, Louise Brooks, Helen B. Dole and the couple Charles Wharton Stork and Elisabeth P. Stork.

She wrote a song that became a Volkslied, "Rote Rosen am Hügel".
