= Automobilfabrik Orion AG =

Swiss manufacturer

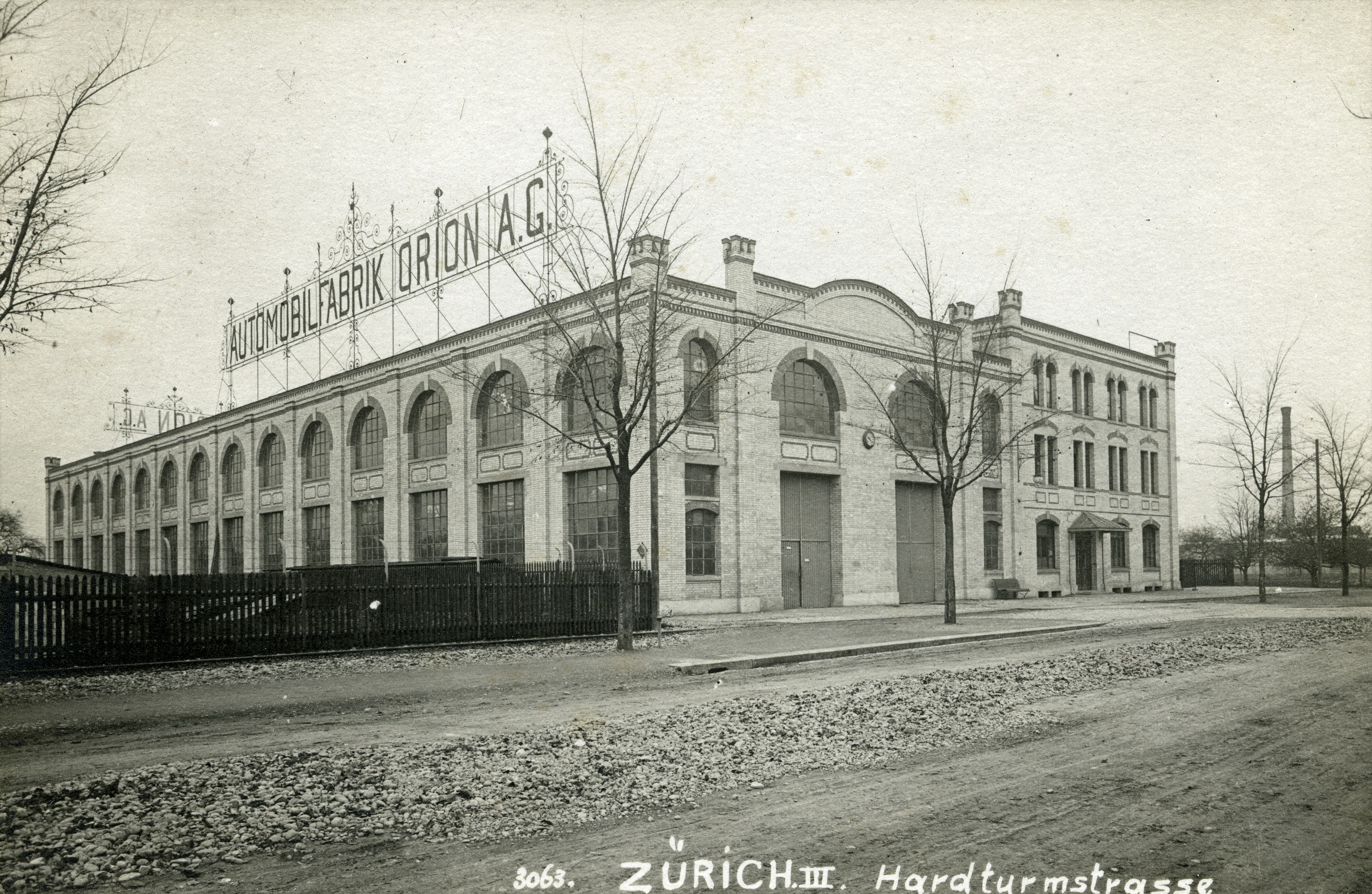
- Type: Public company
- Industry: Automotive
- Founded: 1898; 128 years ago
- Defunct: 1976; 50 years ago
- Fate: Merged with internationally active technology company AL-KO.
- Successor: AL-KO
- Headquarters: Zurich (TG), Switzerland
- Products: Motor vehicles

Automobilfabrik Orion AG was a Swiss manufacturer of cars, trucks and buses under the Orion (beginning in 1900) brand name. Based in Zurich, Switzerland, the firm was active between 1898 and 1976. Zürcher, Automobile Factory Orion AG, formerly Zürcher & Huber, Automobile Factory Orion, was also active in trading foreign-made products and manufactured railways and automobile accessories.

== History ==
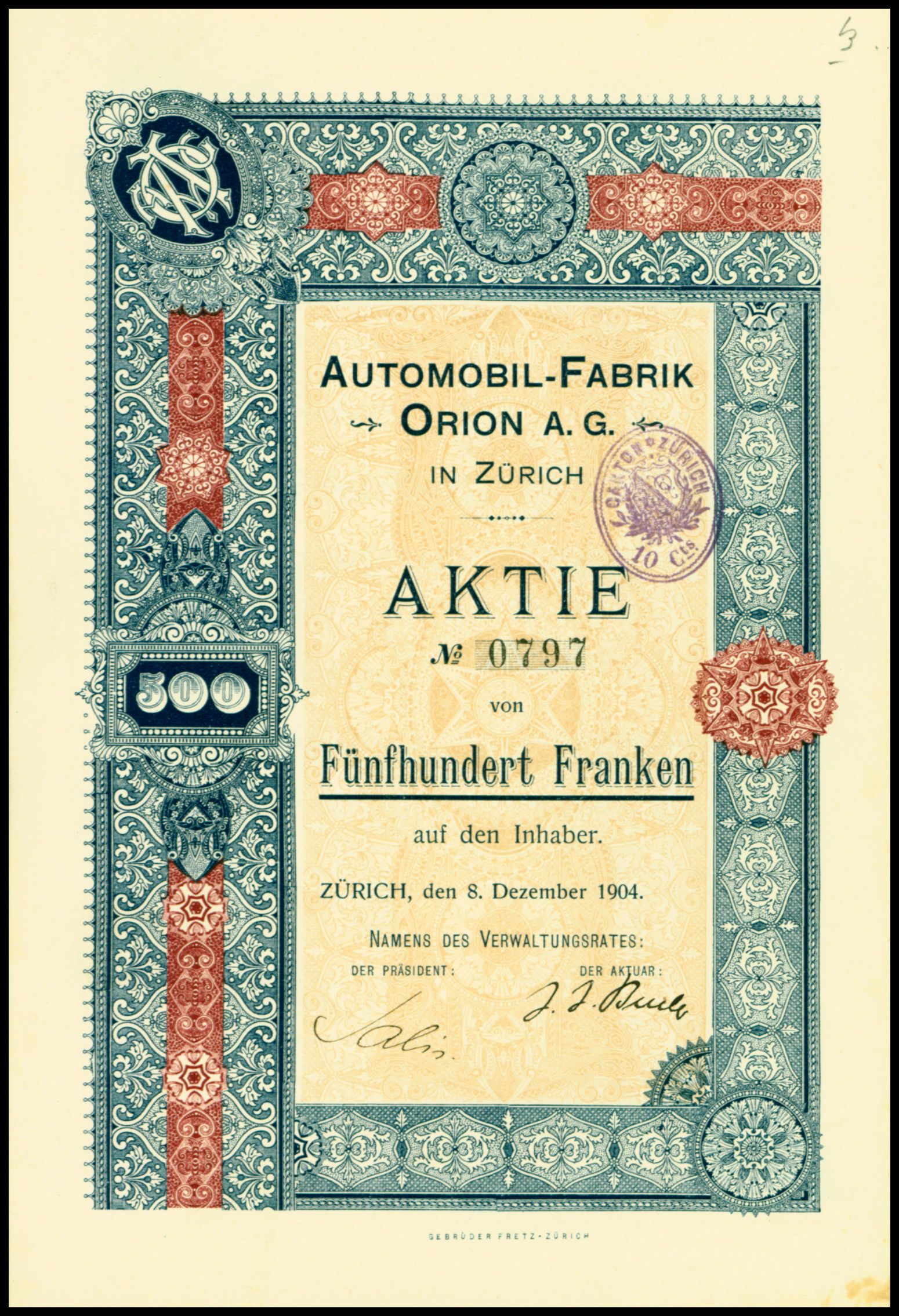
Automobil-Fabrik Orion AG 1904

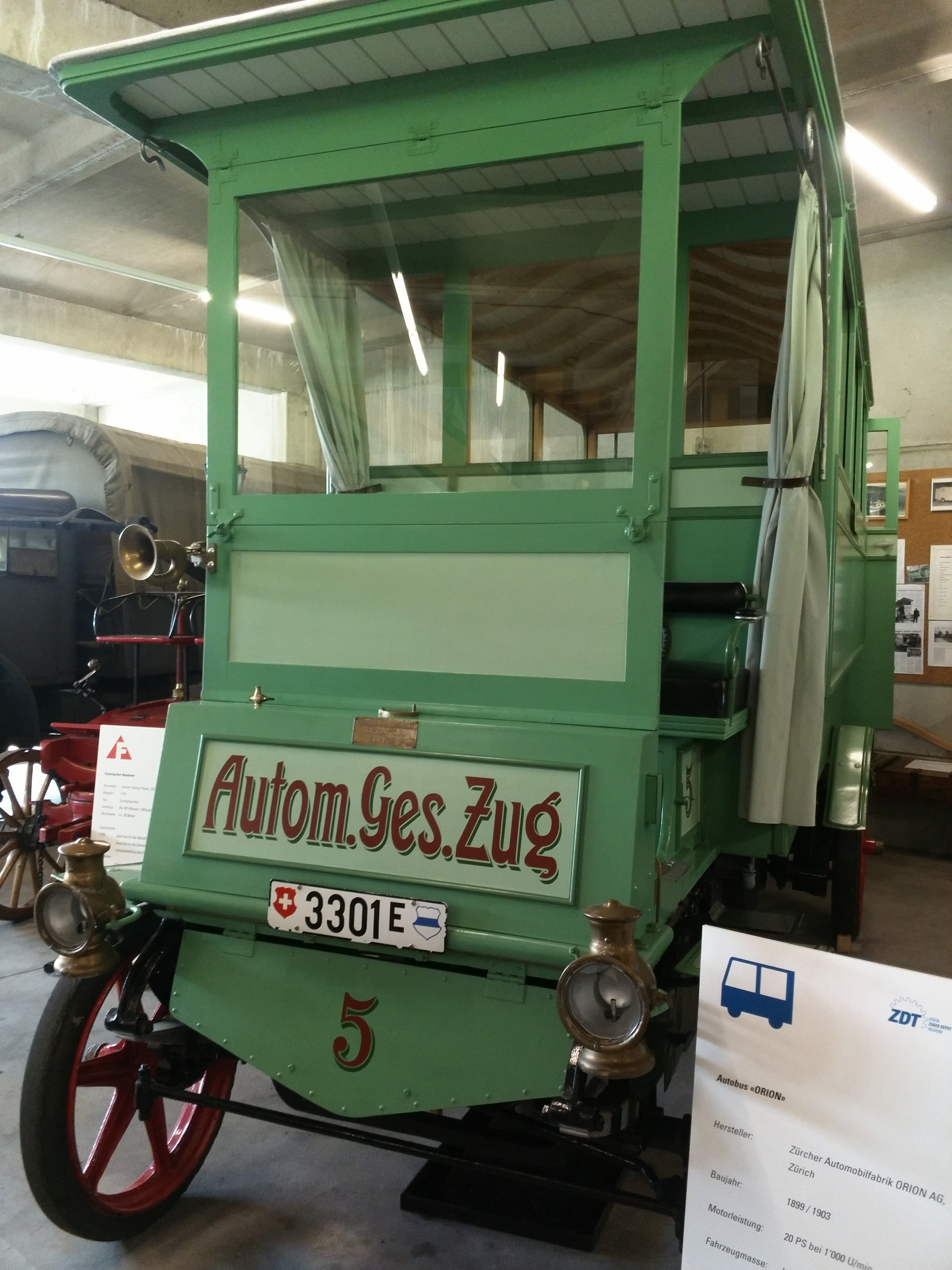
Orion Bus Front

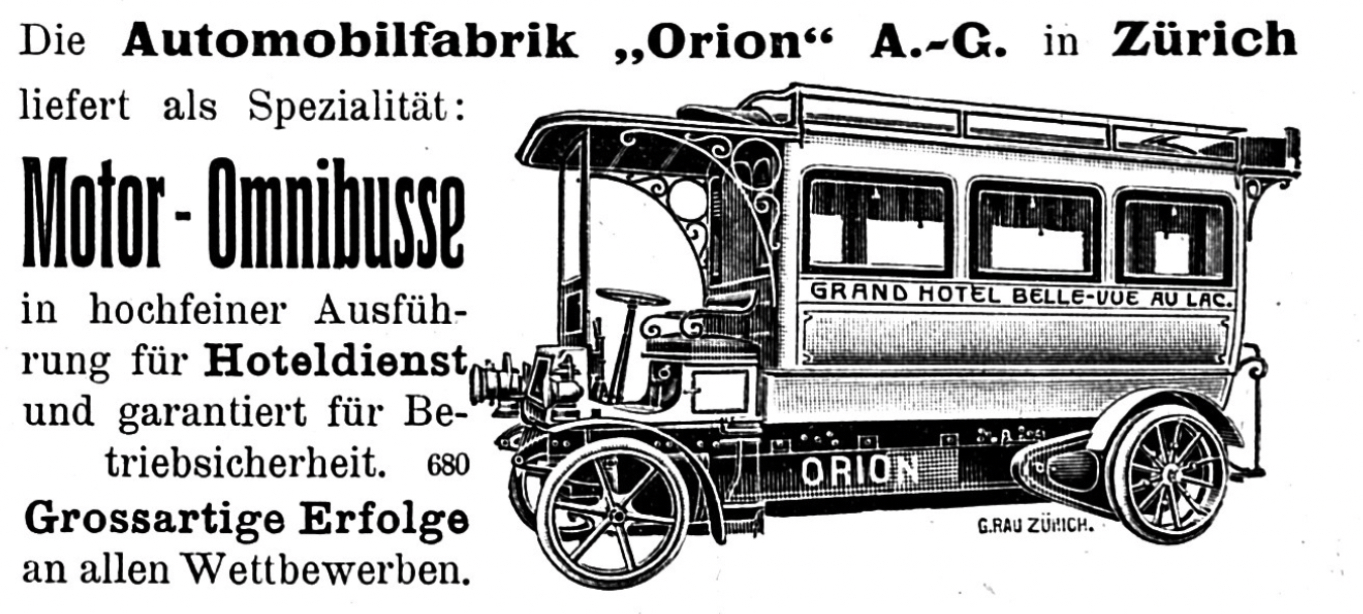
Orion Omnibus advertisement (1907)

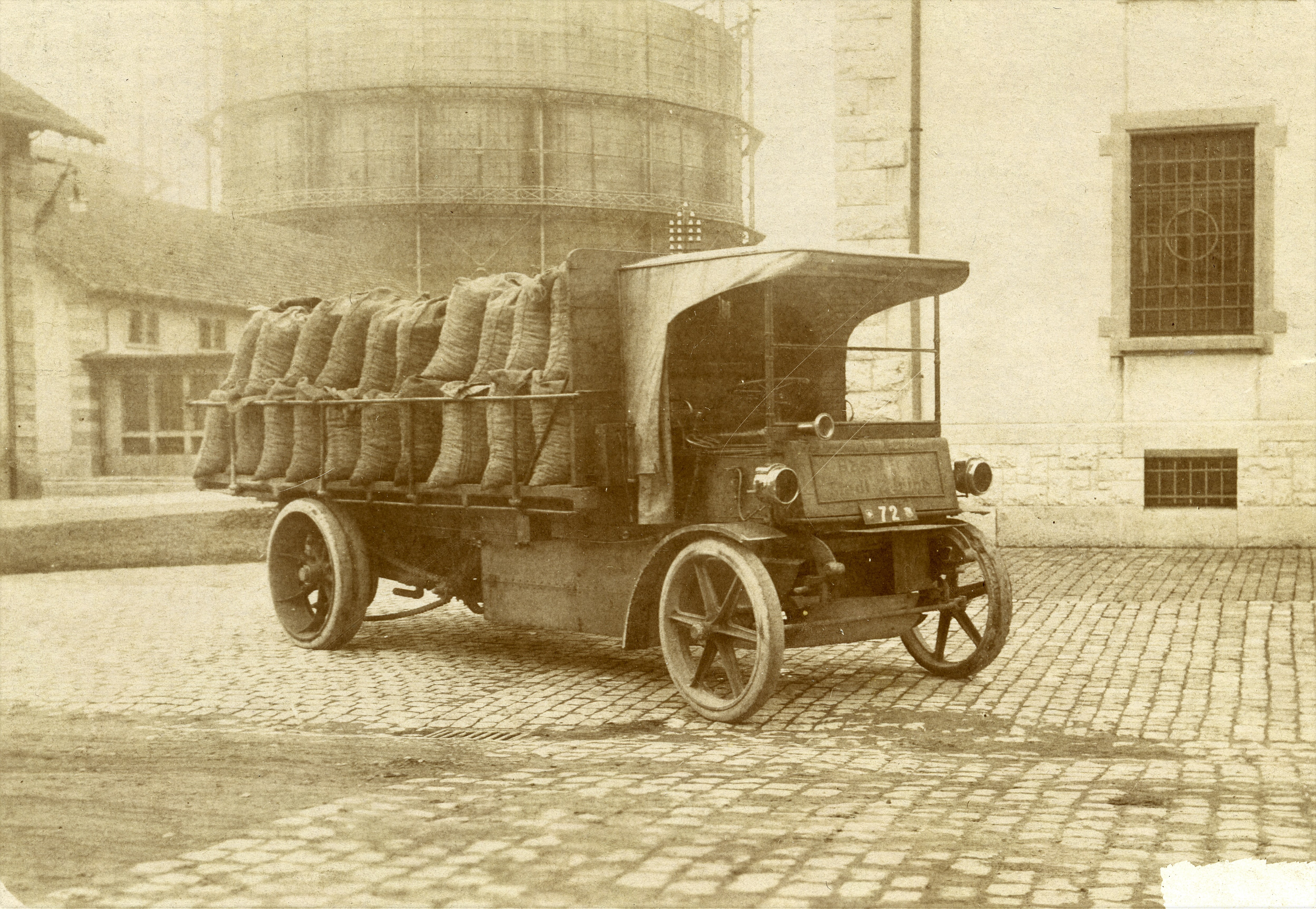
Orion truck

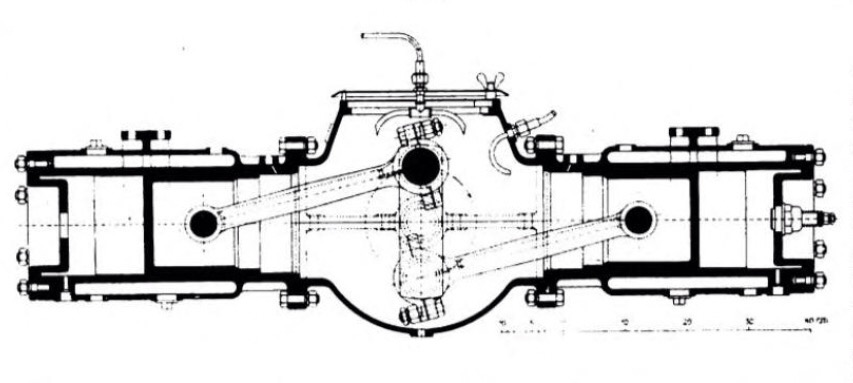
Orion two cylinder engine (1908)

Orion advertisement in US (1910)

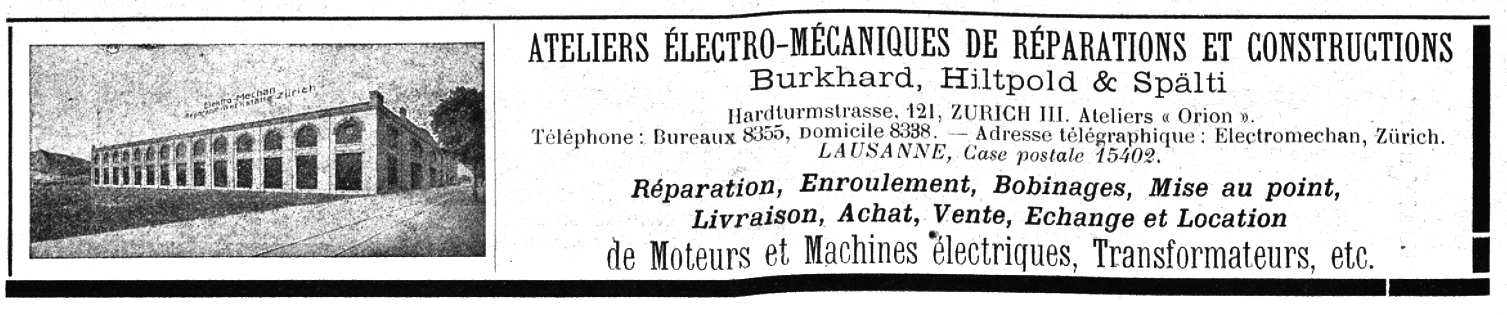
Burkhard, Hiltpold & Spälti in the Orion buildings (1912)

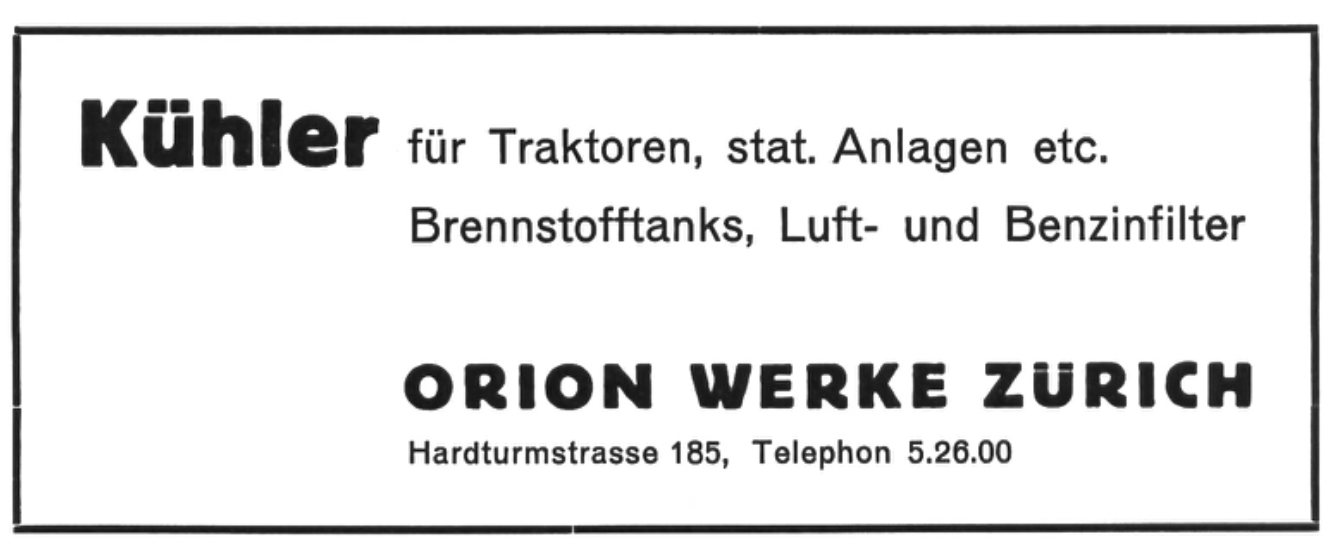
Orion advertisement (1944)

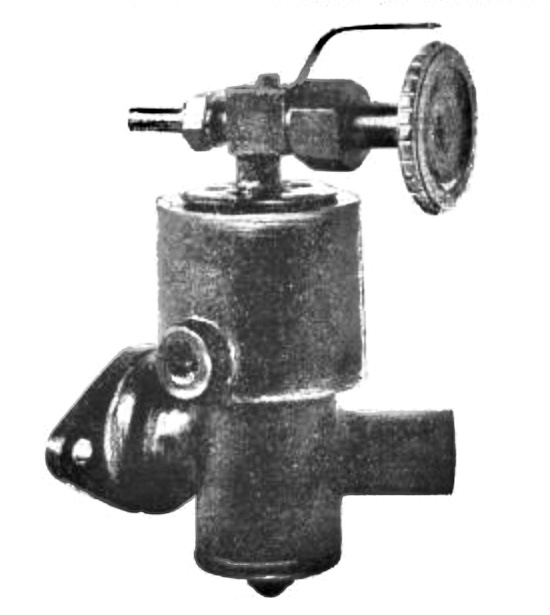
Orion carburetor (1902) patented under number 23586

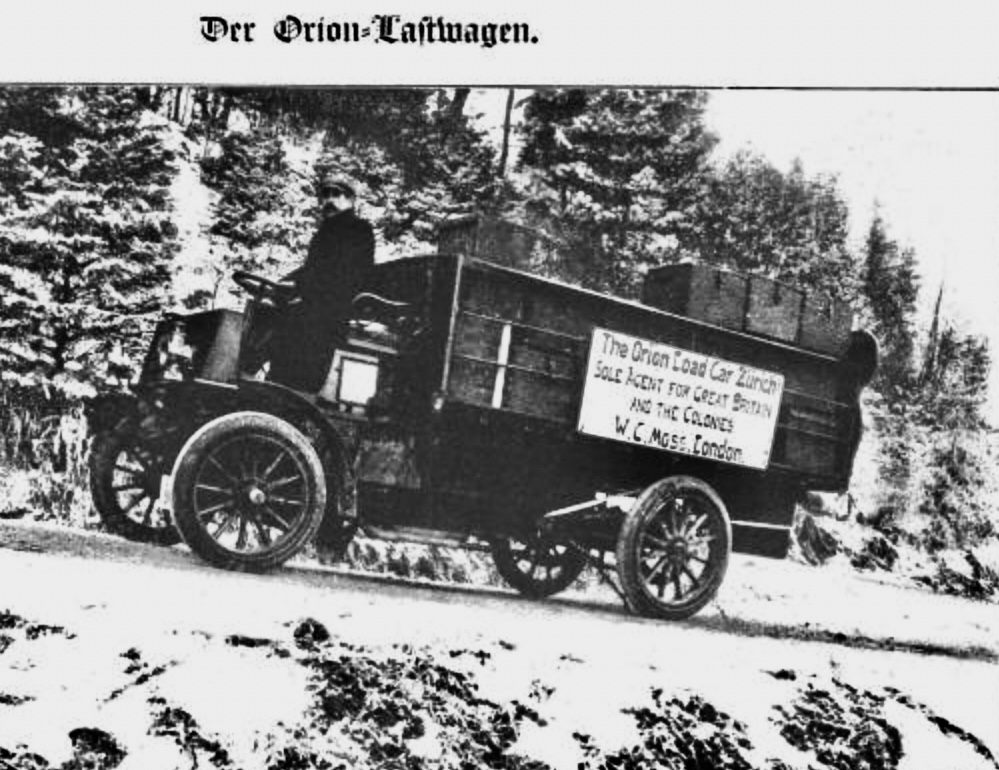
Orion test drive on the Uetliberg with up to 18% incline (1904)

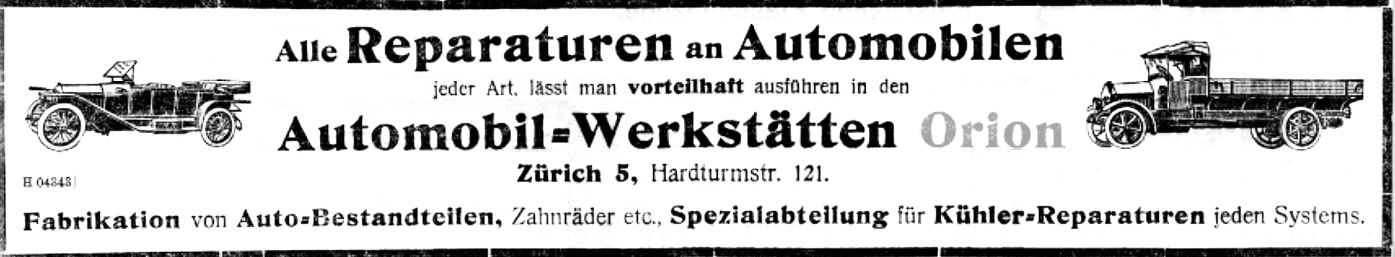
Orion Automobil Werkstätten (1916)

The former employee Alfred Zürcher of the Martini weapons factory opened a workshop in 1898 in Hottingen (Zurich). On June 21, 1900, he founded the company Zürcher & Huber, Automobilfabrik Orion, together with Jean Huber to produce automobiles. The company was located at 281 Hardturmstrasse. The brand name was Orion. Initially, automobiles were manufactured. Orion delivered the first taxi for the city of Zurich. In April 1902, Alfred Zürcher joined the Basel Automobile Club.

The public limited company Orion AG was founded on March 15, 1902. It took over what had previously been run by the firm Zürcher & Huber. The share capital was originally 160,000 francs and was increased to 200,000 francs in 1904. The company never published a business report. Dividends were not paid in 1908 and 1909. Up until then, the Orion brand with its trucks enjoyed a good reputation. From 1902, only trucks, fire engines, and buses were produced. In 1903, exactly 30 trucks were produced. Sales figures were given as 13 cars for 1903, 48 vehicles for 1904, and 72 for 1905. The company was also involved in railway construction. Between 1903 and 1905, 50 units of the Oldsmobile Curved Dash were imported and sold.

In 1904, it was transformed into a joint-stock company called Zürcher, Automobilfabrik Orion AG. Branches were also established in Bologna, Italy, and Marseille, France. The joint-stock company founded in Bologna had a starting capital of 1,200,000 lire. In the 26,000 sqm factory complex, five different Orion vehicles were produced in 1907. The engines included a single-cylinder 9/10 hp, a two-cylinder 12/14 hp, a two-cylinder 20/22 hp, a two-cylinder 24/25 hp, and the top model with a four-cylinder 35/40 hp.

The French company named ″Compagnie Orion Francais″ was founded with a share capital of 600,000 francs. Of the many omnibuses licensed in London, in 1905 one, in 1906 nine, and in 1907 also nine buses of the Orion brand were licensed. Buses for Switzerland were designed with a width of 1800 mm to fit the narrow roads. Vehicle production ended in 1910.

In July 1910, the motor truck factory "Orion" in Zurich was liquidated. In 1912, the company Burkhard, Hiltpold & Spälti rented space in the Orion buildings on Hardturmstrasse. In addition to repairing commercial vehicles, the company now manufactured accessories for the automotive industry. These included rims, radiators, car heaters, and other accessories. In 1917, 751 trucks were registered in Switzerland, of which 531 were Swiss-made. Of the 531 Swiss trucks, 114 were from the Orion AG. In 1918, 70 trucks from Orion AG were still registered.

Between 1918 and 1935, Mathis vehicles were sold. At the end of 1976, the company was taken over by the internationally active technology group AL-KO Kober Vehicle Technology.

== Models ==
=== Buses ===
- Orion Autobus

=== Trucks ===
- 7/9 hp
- 12 hp 1250 kg
- 1500 kg 1 cylinder
- 20 hp 2000 kg
- 2500 kg 1 cylinder
- 20 hp 3000 kg
- 30 hp 3500 kg
- 4000 kg 2 cylinder
- 5000 kg 2 cylinder
- 12/24 hp
- 16/18 hp
- 22/24 hp

While most manufacturers tried to increase the RPM of their engines in order to achieve smaller and lighter engines, Orion had decided to go against the trend. Their goal was to develop engines with low RPM. To continue sticking with two-cylinder machines with large piston diameters, the only option was to consider an engine with an opposed-piston arrangement, that is, a face-to-face layout, what is now commonly referred to as a boxer engine. The speed thus remained below 600 revolutions per minute with up to 24 hp, as with the 22/24 hp engine. With the design, it was hoped that the engine and transmission would have a longer lifespan with lower lubricant consumption. The wheelbase of the 5-ton truck with 22/24 hp was 3400 mm. The length from the radiator to the end of the flatbed was 4835 mm. The front tire including suspension still extended in front of the radiator, so the overall vehicle length reached about 5000 mm. The track width was 1650 mm. The front tires had a diameter of 830 mm. The rear wheels with dual tires had a diameter of 920 mm. The Orion vehicles have wheels made of cast steel, which are usually covered with solid rubber. In vehicles with a crane, it is powered by the main drive. The crane automatically shuts off when it reaches the maximum height. The crane allows the lifting of barrels up to 800 kg, as can be seen with the vehicle for the Perlberga spirit factory, where a 700 kg barrel is hanging on the hook. The pump on the fire truck is also powered by the main engine. It can deliver water volumes of 80 liters per minute at 8 hPa. The vehicle carries an 800-liter water tank.

== Gallery of Orion vehicles ==
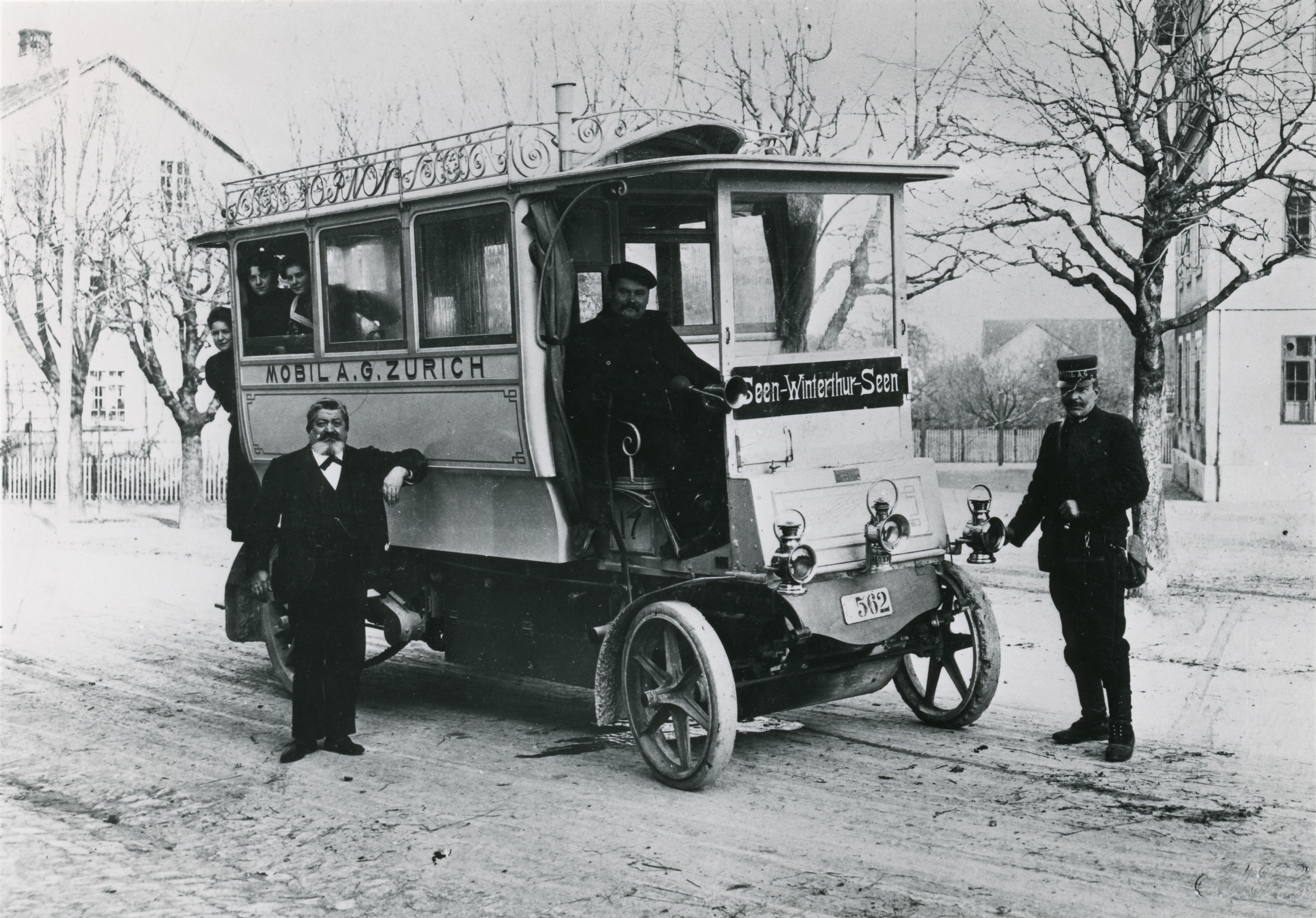
Omnibus 1905

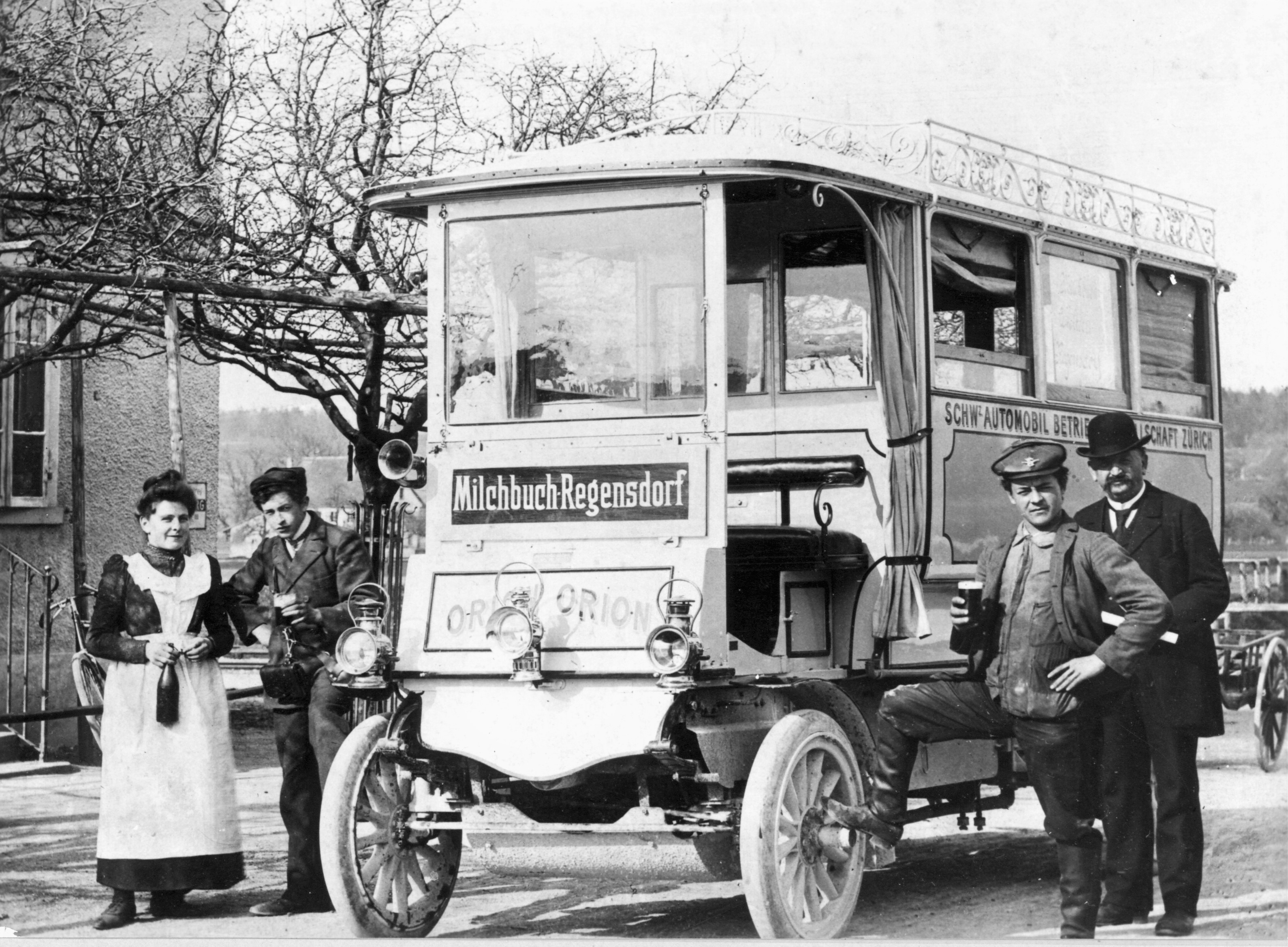
Omnibus 1900

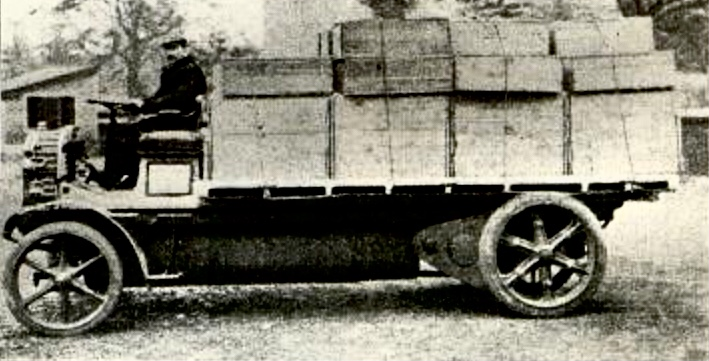
Orion truck 18–20 hp

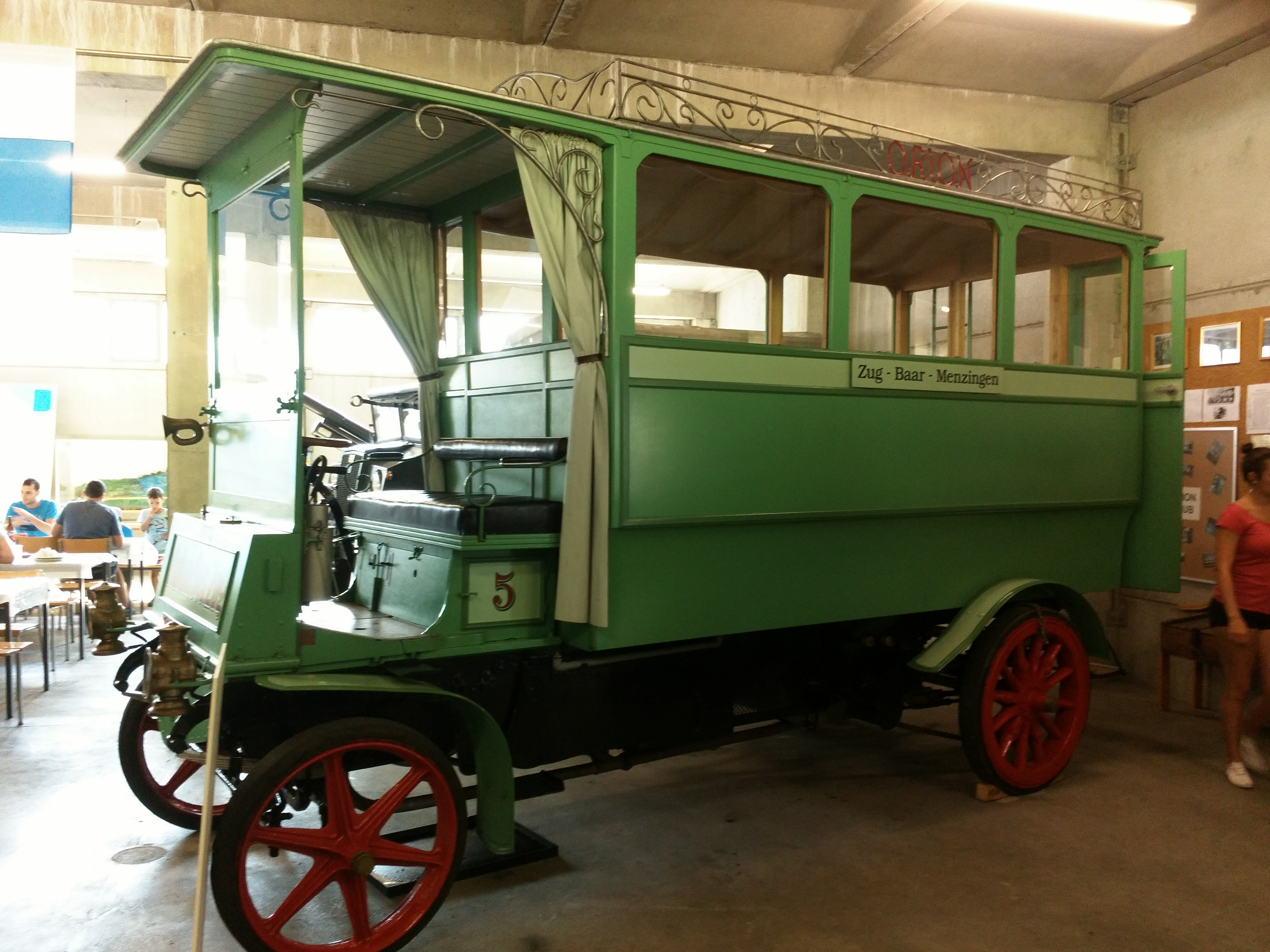
Omnibus

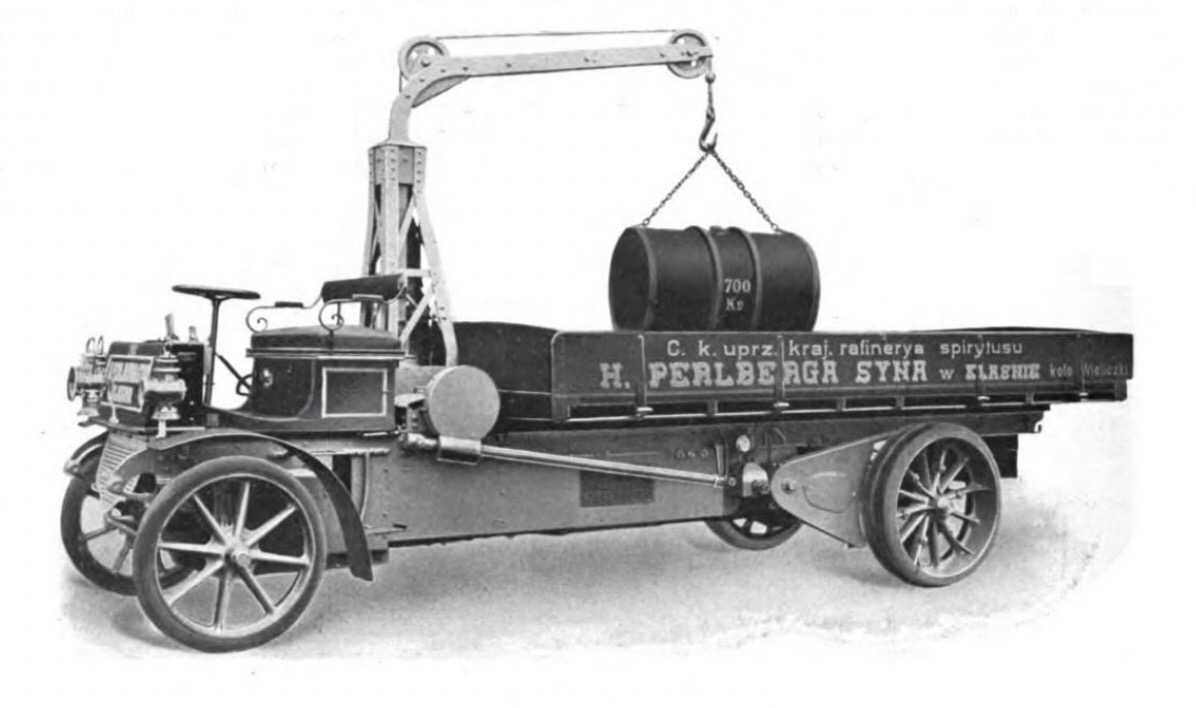
Orion 5t (1908) with crane

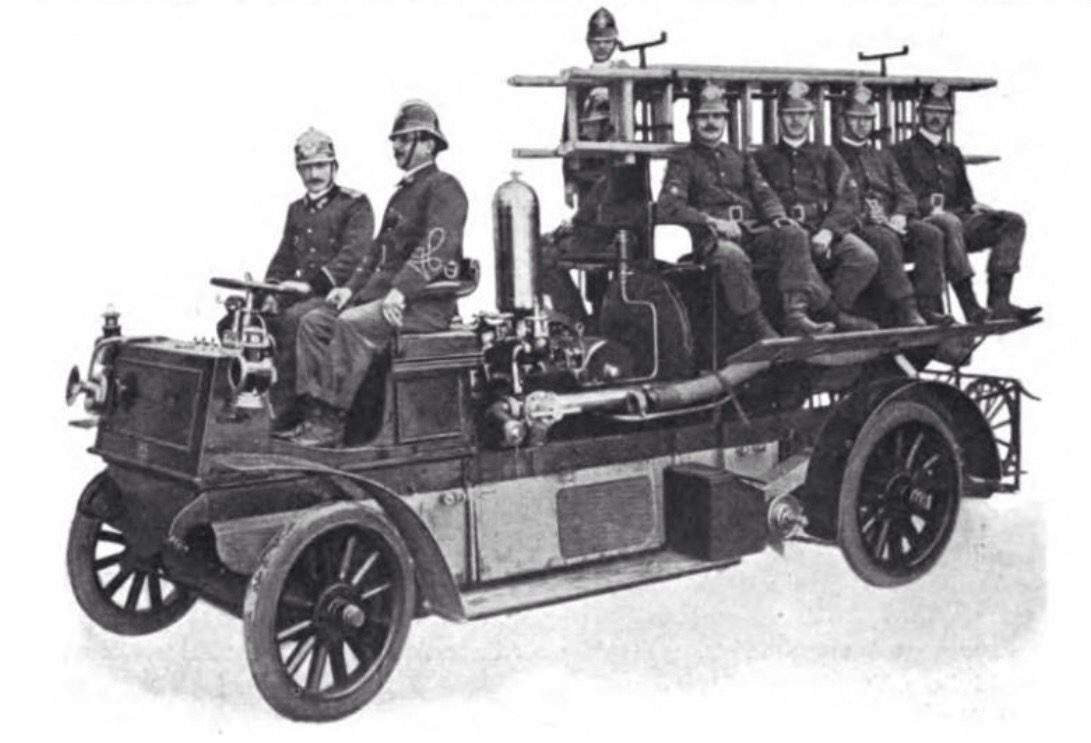
Orion fire engine (1908)

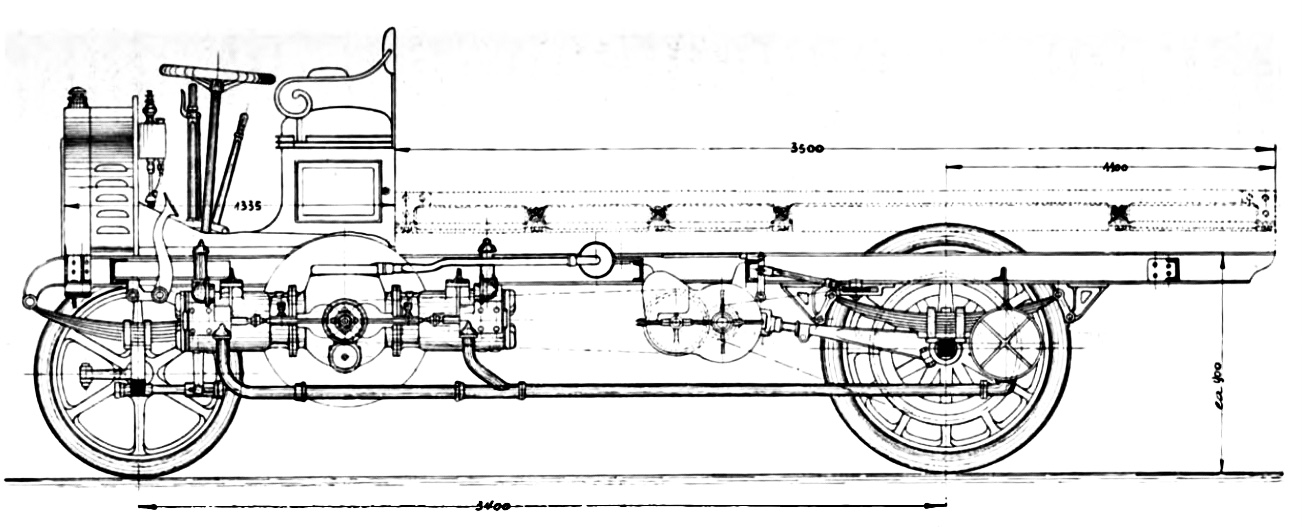
Orion 5t side view (1908)

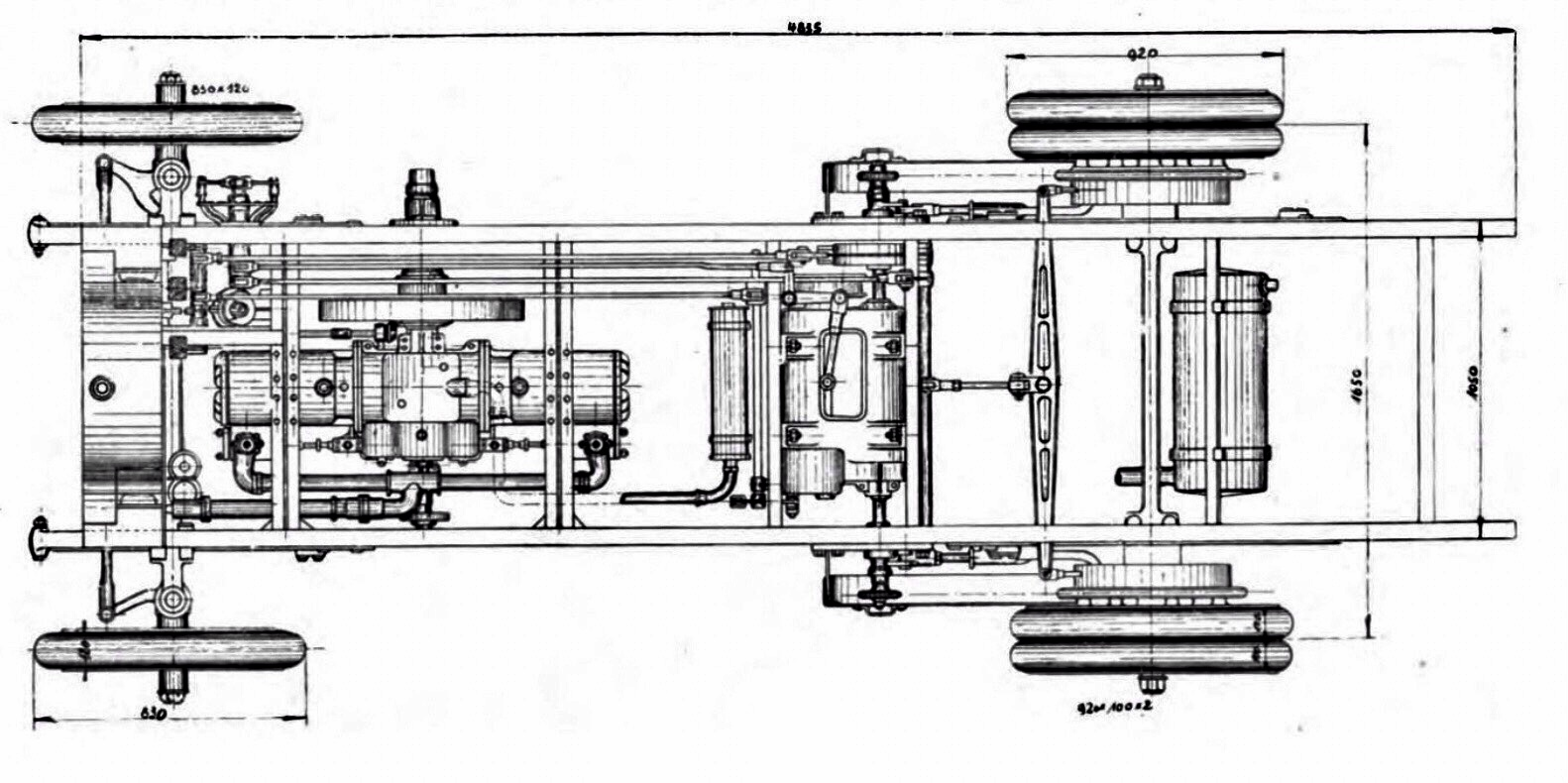
Orion 5t top view (1908)

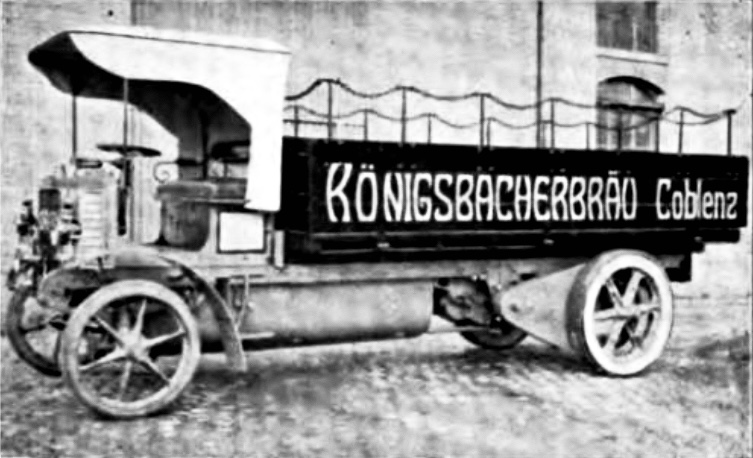
Orion 5t of the Koblenz Brewery (1908)

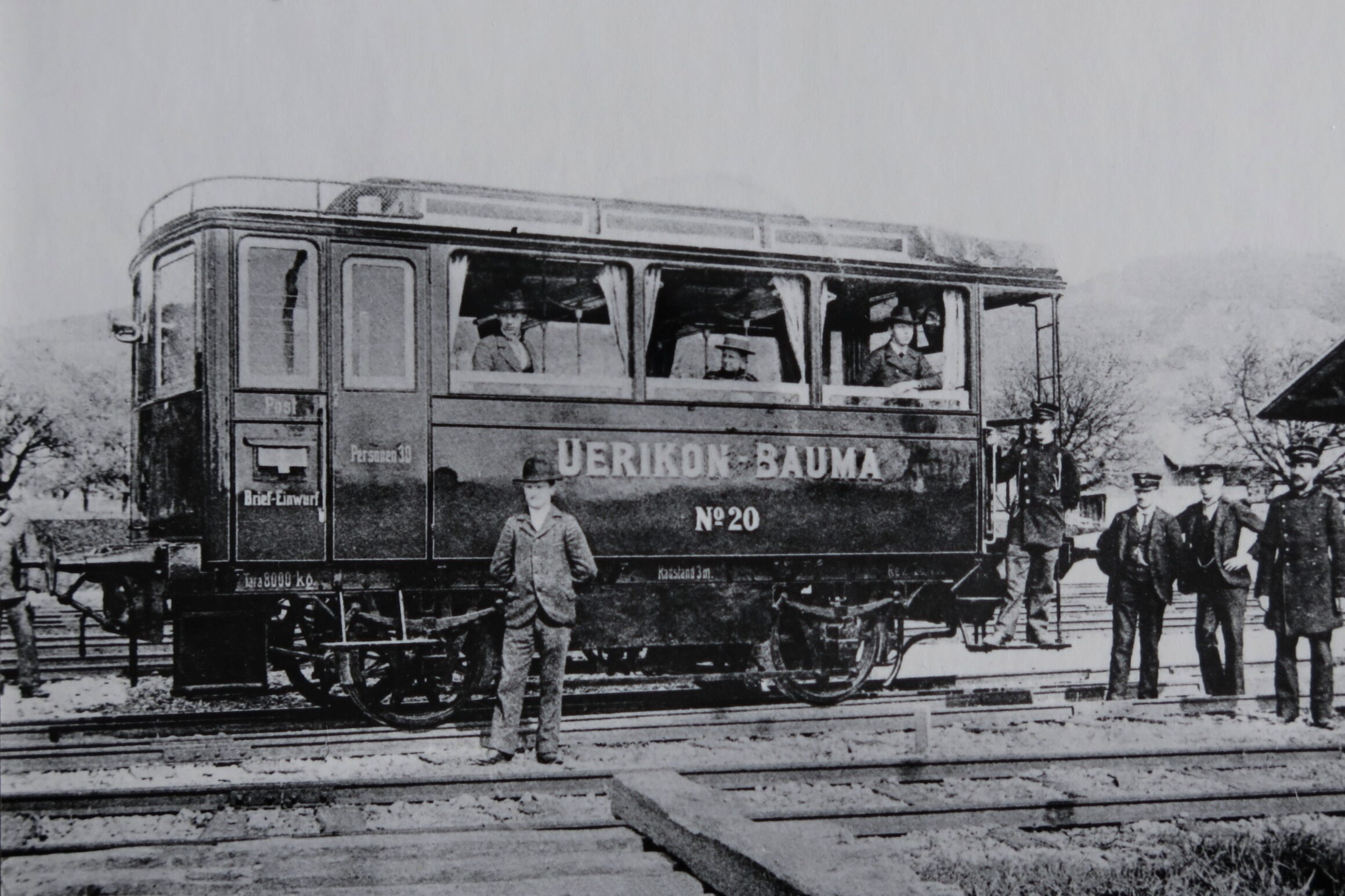
railway locomotive UeBB CZm 1 2 20 (1905) Uerikon–Bauma railway abbreviated UeBB, as a test car manufactured by the Automobilfabrik Orion Zurich

== Sources ==
- Der Omnibus «Orion»
- Sandro Sigrist: Elektrische Strassenbahnen im Kanton Zug. Prellbock, Leissigen 1997, ISBN 3-907579-04-6
- Zuger Depot Technikgeschichte
- Orion «Orion»
