= Dexter Axle =

American manufacturer of trailer axles, brakes and related components

Dexter Axle Company
- Trade name: Dexter Group
- Type: Subsidiary
- Industry: Trailer components
- Founded: 1960
- Founder: Leonard Dexter
- Headquarters: Elkhart, Indiana, United States
- Products: Trailer axles; brakes; suspension components; trailer parts
- Parent: DexKo Global
- Website: www.dextergroup.com

Dexter Axle Company (also branded as the Dexter Group) is an American manufacturer of trailer axles, brakes, suspension components and related running-gear parts, headquartered in Elkhart, Indiana. Dexter is part of DexKo Global, a trailer and recreational-vehicle components group formed through the combination of Dexter and AL-KO Kober Vehicle Technology.

== History ==
Dexter was founded in 1960 by Leonard Dexter in Elkhart, Indiana, initially supplying axle products for markets including manufactured housing and recreational vehicles.

In 2012, The Sterling Group acquired the Dexter Axle business from Tomkins Industries, Inc.

In late 2015 and early 2016, Dexter combined with AL-KO Vehicle Technology to form DexKo Global Inc., with Dexter continuing as a brand within the group.

In 2021, Brookfield Business Partners announced an agreement to acquire DexKo Global for US$3.4 billion.

== Products ==
Dexter manufactures trailer axles and brakes and supplies related components including hubs, drums/rotors, suspension components and brake actuation products, serving utility trailer, recreational vehicle, marine, agricultural and specialty trailer markets. Dexter also maintains Dexter Index, a digital platform for axle configuration and parts identification.

== Acquisitions ==
Dexter has expanded through acquisitions in adjacent trailer-component categories, including:

- Unique Functional Products (UFP) – acquired in 2013; supplier of marine trailer axle and braking components.
- Tie Down Engineering (axle/brake/actuation assets) – acquired in 2017 (assets only).
- Redneck Inc. and Redline Products – acquired in 2021; trailer parts distribution businesses.

== Safety and recalls ==
Dexter-manufactured axles and components have been referenced in safety recalls documented by the U.S. National Highway Traffic Safety Administration (NHTSA), including recalls citing issues such as potential weld defects or assembly errors affecting axle or wheel-end integrity.
