= AL-KO Kober Vehicle Technology =

German manufacturer of chassis and towing components

AL-KO Vehicle Technology Group

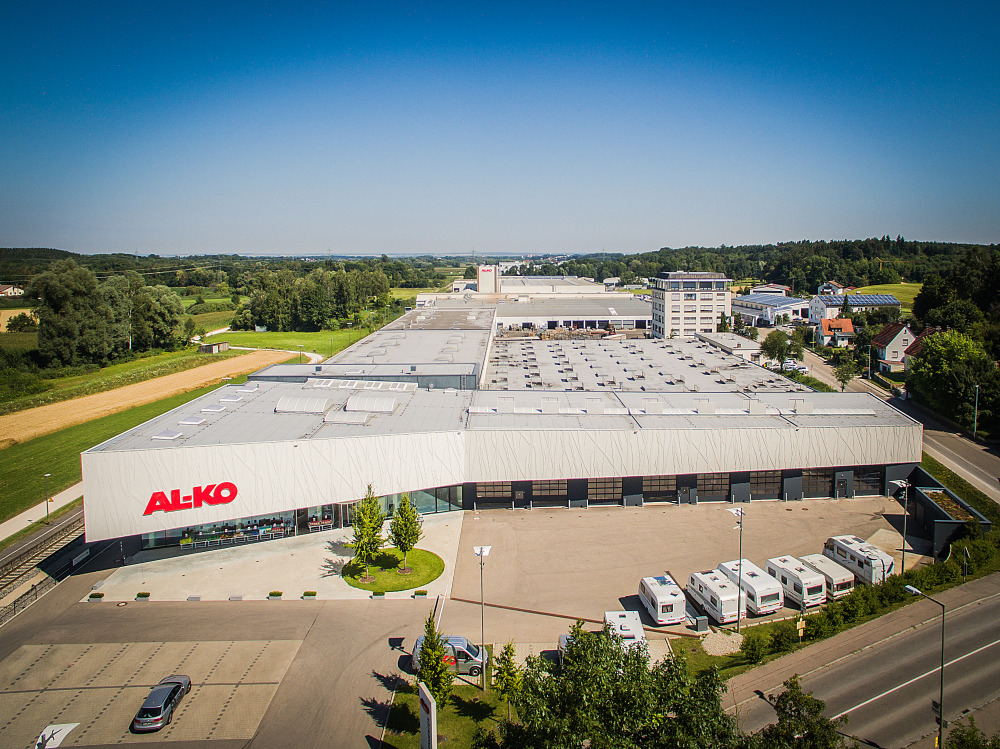
- Headquarters in Kleinkötz (Kötz), Bavaria, Germany
- Type: Subsidiary / business unit
- Industry: Vehicle components; trailer and recreational vehicle chassis technology
- Founded: 11 November 1931; 94 years ago (as a locksmith's shop)
- Founder: Alois Kober
- Headquarters: Kötz, Bavaria, Germany,
- Area served: Worldwide
- Products: Chassis and chassis components for trailers, caravans and motorhomes; couplings and stabilisers; braking and suspension systems; support and levelling systems; related electronics
- Parent: DexKo Global
- Website: www.alko-tech.com

AL-KO Vehicle Technology Group is a German manufacturer of chassis technology and related components for trailers, caravans and motorhomes, and for certain commercial, agricultural and construction vehicle applications. It operates as a business unit of DexKo Global, following the combination of AL-KO Vehicle Technology and Dexter Axle that was completed in January 2016. In 2021, Brookfield Business Partners agreed to acquire DexKo Global in a transaction valued at US$3.4 billion.

== History ==
=== Origins and early internationalisation (1931–1960s) ===
AL-KO traces its origins to 11 November 1931, when master locksmith Alois Kober took over a small locksmith's shop in Kötz, Bavaria. The business developed into a small industrial company during the 1950s, producing components such as handbrake parts and overrun braking systems for trailers.

The company records its first international expansion as the establishment of a subsidiary in Austria in 1961, followed by entities in England, France, Italy and Switzerland in 1970.

=== Expansion in caravan and motorhome technologies (1970s–2015) ===
From the 1970s, AL-KO increasingly focused on components for caravans and leisure vehicles, including further developments in overrun braking (with auto-reverse capability) and later chassis solutions for motorhomes. Products associated with this period include the AKS stabiliser coupling range and the ATC (AL-KO Trailer Control) electronic stability system for caravans and trailers. Caravan publications have discussed ATC as an optional electronic system intended to help mitigate trailer sway by braking the caravan when excessive movement is detected.

=== Integration into DexKo (2016–present) ===
The strategic combination of Dexter Axle and AL-KO Vehicle Technology was completed in January 2016, forming DexKo Global Inc., with the Dexter and AL-KO brands retained within the new group structure. In July 2021, Brookfield Business Partners and institutional partners announced an agreement to acquire DexKo Global for approximately US$3.4 billion, with completion later that year following regulatory approvals.

== Relationship to the AL-KO brand group ==
The AL-KO brand has been used by separate businesses, including AL-KO Gardentech, AL-KO Vehicle Technology Group and AL-KO Airtech. Industry material distinguishes between AL-KO Vehicle Technology (part of DexKo Global) and the AL-KO Group entities associated with Gardentech and Airtech, describing them as independent groups following corporate restructuring around the Dexter combination. AL-KO Air Technology, within AL-KO Airtech, was acquired by Trane Technologies in 2022.

== Operations ==
AL-KO Vehicle Technology operates as a global business unit within DexKo Global, with sites and subsidiaries in Europe, North America and the Asia–Pacific region. Company materials record international expansion including the establishment of branches in the United States (1983) and Australia (1986). DexKo describes itself as a supplier of trailer running gear, chassis assemblies and related components formed through the combination of Dexter and AL-KO Vehicle Technology.

== Brands and acquisitions ==
=== Brands ===
Within the DexKo group, AL-KO Vehicle Technology products are associated with a number of brands. DexKo’s brand listing includes AL-KO Vehicle Technology, SAWIKO, Winterhoff, Bradley Doublelock, Brink, E&P Hydraulics, and electronics brands such as CBE and Nordelettronica, among others. AL-KO Vehicle Technology’s business-division descriptions also identify Bradley as a brand used for trailer and hitch components. In 2016, AL-KO Kober stated that it would continue to invest in the Bradley Doublelock and Dixon-Bate brands in the United Kingdom.

=== Acquisitions and investments ===
Reported acquisitions and other corporate actions involving AL-KO Vehicle Technology and the wider DexKo group include:

- SAWIKO – acquired at the end of 2011, according to SAWIKO company history.
- Winterhoff Group – acquisition announced by DexKo in 2016 via AL-KO Vehicle Technology.
- E&P Hydraulics – acquisition announced in 2018; DexKo identified E&P as a manufacturer of levelling system solutions for caravans, motorhomes and light commercial vehicles.
- Bankside Patterson – acquisition of UK-based chassis manufacturer Bankside Patterson Ltd, announced by DexKo in 2019.
- Safim S.p.A. – acquisition announced in 2019; DexKo described Safim as a manufacturer of hydraulic components including braking-related products.
- Aguti Produktentwicklung & Design GmbH – acquisition completed in 2020; Aguti was described as a supplier of seating systems for commercial and leisure vehicles.
- Nordelettronica – acquisition announced in 2020; DexKo described Nordelettronica as an electronics specialist for recreational vehicles.
- Brink International – agreement announced in 2021 and completion later in 2021; Brink was described as a towbar solutions specialist.
- Toptron Elektronik – acquisition completed in 2024; DexKo described Toptron as a manufacturer of electronic components for the leisure-vehicle sector.

== Products ==
AL-KO Vehicle Technology’s published product range covers chassis and running-gear components for trailers, caravans and motorhomes, together with coupling, braking, suspension, support and levelling systems and related electronic stability products. The company history records a move from general metalworking into series production through handbrake components in the 1950s, followed by overrun braking systems for trailers.

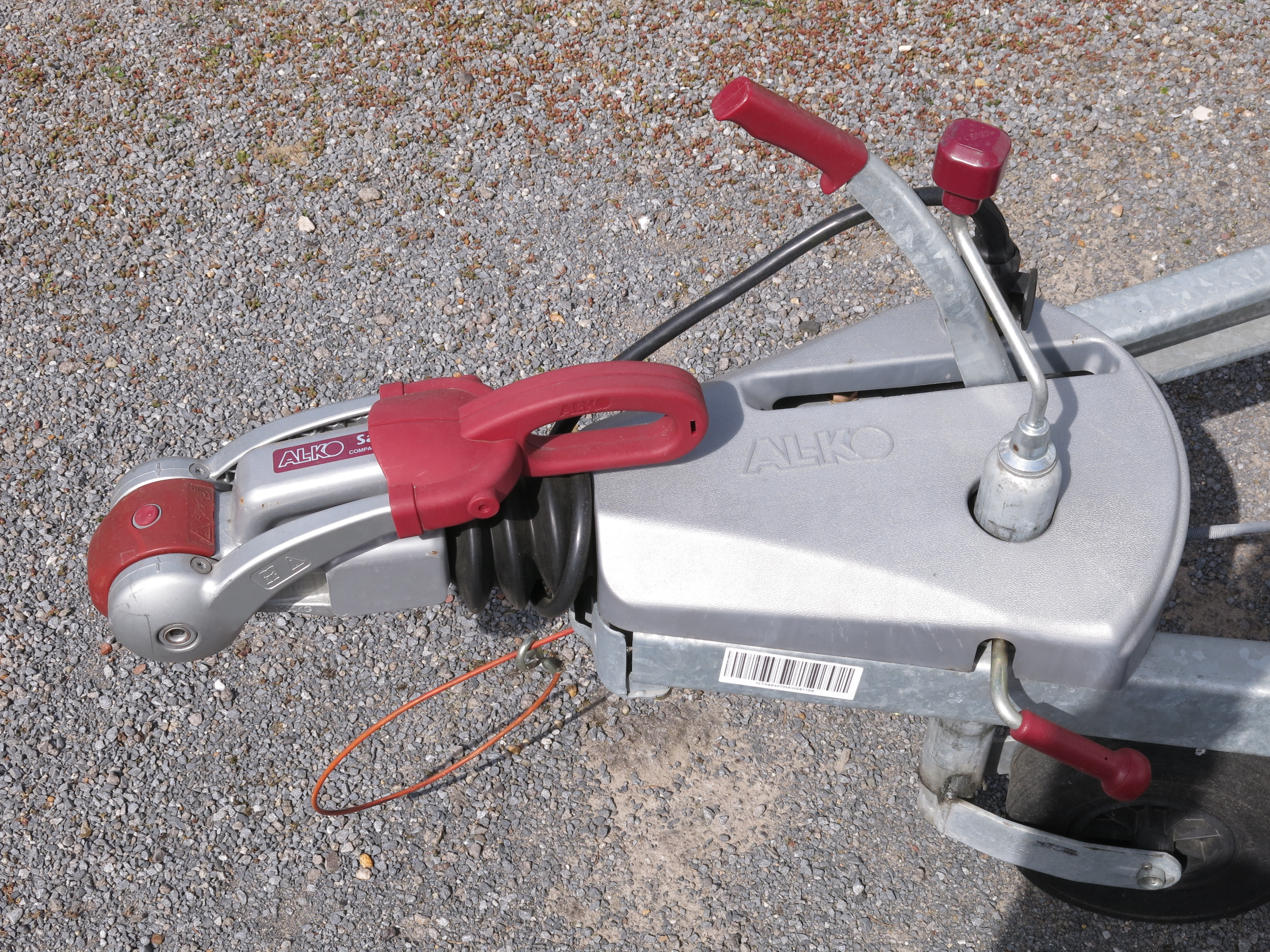
An AL-KO stabiliser (anti-snake) coupling (Schlingerdämpfer).

=== Chassis and running gear ===
AL-KO supplies chassis and running-gear systems for trailers in the leisure and general trailer markets, including axles, suspension components and chassis parts, along with accessories. In the motorhome sector, the company offers the AMC (AL-KO Motor Chassis) range, including low-frame chassis intended for coachbuilt motorhome bodies. For commercial vehicles and transporters, AL-KO lists chassis variants and suspension offerings for bodybuilder and fleet applications, including low-frame chassis marketed under names such as VARIO SPACE.

=== Couplings, stabilisation and theft deterrence ===
AL-KO manufactures coupling heads and stabiliser couplings for towing applications, including products described as reducing trailer sway through friction-based stabilisation. The product catalogue also groups security and anti-theft devices, including coupling-related products, within its trailer and leisure-vehicle accessories range.

=== Braking systems ===
AL-KO supplies braking components for braked trailer running gear, including wheel-brake assemblies and associated service parts. One product line is the AAA Premium Brake, which the company describes as a self-adjusting wheel-brake system for certain AL-KO brake types. Caravan media has discussed AAA Premium Brake in the context of retrofit upgrades and towing performance.

=== Electronic stability and trailer control ===
In addition to mechanical stabilisers, AL-KO markets the ATC (AL-KO Trailer Control) electronic stability system, which uses sensors to monitor trailer movement and can apply the caravan’s brakes to help restore stability when pre-set thresholds are exceeded. Practical Caravan and other publications have described ATC as an optional system that can be factory-fitted or retrofitted to many caravans.

=== Support and levelling systems ===
For motorhomes, AL-KO offers hydraulic support and levelling systems including HY4 and the LevelM range. The LevelM Pro product description refers to the integration of control technology from E&P in an external protective enclosure. Additional motorhome support systems are listed in the company’s product categories.

== Safety and recalls ==
In 2018, AL-KO announced a recall affecting certain K50 coupling hitch balls and advised owners to stop using affected parts pending inspection and return through the company’s stated procedure.

== See also ==
- DexKo Global
- Dexter Axle
