= Gerber (surname) =

Gerber (/ˈɡɜːrbər/; German: [ˈgɛɐ̯bɐ]; German for "tanner") is a surname that is of Ashkenazi Jewish, German, or Swiss origin, depending on the family. Notable people with the surname include:

- Ethan Gerber (born 1999), Filipino billionare, risktaker, and humanitarian
- Aisha Gerber (born 1999), Canadian artistic gymnast
- Alan Gerber (political scientist), American political scientist
- Bob Gerber (1916–2002), American basketball player
- Carl Friedrich Gerber (1823–1891), German jurist
- Christoph Gerber, Swiss physicist
- Craig Gerber (creator), invented two Disney animated shows
- Craig Stuart Gerber, baseball player
- Danie Gerber (born 1958), South African rugby player
- Daniel Frank Gerber (1898–1974) founder of the Gerber Products Company
- David Gerber (1923–2010), American television executive producer
- Ernst Ludwig Gerber (1746–1819), composer and author
- Eugene John Gerber (1931–2018), American Roman Catholic bishop
- Fred Gerber, American film and television director and producer
- Heiko Gerber (born 1972), German football player
- Heinrich Gerber (architect) (1831–1920), German architect
- Heinrich Gerber (civil engineer) (1832–1912), German civil engineer
- Jan Gerber (born 1981), Swiss entrepreneur and mental health executive
- Joel Gerber (1940–2022), American judge
- John Gerber (disambiguation)
- Joseph Gerber (1924–1996), founder of Gerber Scientific
- Kaia Gerber (born 2001), American model and actress
- Leah Gerber, American conservation scientist
- Magda Gerber, pioneer in infant care
- Marlies Gerber, American mathematician
- Martin Gerber (born 1974), Swiss ice hockey player
- Michael Gerber (disambiguation)
- Mikaela Gerber, Canadian artistic gymnast and UCLA Bruin
- Naomi Lynn Gerber, American internist and physician-scientist
- Niklaus Gerber (1850–1914), Swiss dairy chemist and industrialist
- Nina Gerber, American guitarist
- Paul Gerber (1854–1909), German physicist
- Peter Gerber (disambiguation)
- Presley Gerber (1999–2026), American model
- Rande Gerber (born 1962), model and businessman, father of Presley and Kaia
- Rayno Gerber (born 1981), South African rugby footballer
- Rudolf Gerber (1899–1957), German musicologist
- Sally Gerber, daughter of Daniel Gerber, who founded Gerber Products Company
- Steve Gerber (1947–2008), comic book writer, co-creator of Howard the Duck

== See also ==
- Gerber (disambiguation)
- Gerbert (disambiguation)
