= Gerber =

Gerber may refer to:

== Companies ==
- Gerber Legendary Blades, a maker of consumer knives and tools headquartered in Oregon, United States
- Gerber Products Company, manufacturer of baby products in Michigan, United States
  - Gerber Life Insurance Company, affiliated with Gerber Products
- Gerber Scientific, a company specializing in graphics and flexible material machinery in Connecticut, United States

== Places ==
=== United States ===
- Gerber, California
- Gerber, Georgia, a ghost town
- Gerber/Hart Library and Archives in Chicago, Illinois
- Gerber Scout Reservation, a summer camp for Boy Scouts, in Michigan

== People ==
- Gerber (surname)
- Von Gerber

== Other ==
- Gerber convention, an ace-asking convention in contract bridge
- Gerber format, computer file format for fabricating printed circuit boards
- Gerber sandwich, an open-faced sandwich made in St. Louis, Missouri
- Gerber failure criterion, an engineering stress-life method of estimating a structural material's fatigue life
- Gerbera (drone), a Russian military drone model, sometimes called Gerber

== See also ==
- Gerbera, a type of daisy
- Gerbert (disambiguation)
- Geber (disambiguation)
