= Wulp =

Wulp may refer to:

- Frederik Maurits van der Wulp (1818–1899), Dutch entomologist
- John Wulp (1928–2018), American artist
- Wulp Castle, Küsnacht, Switzerland
