= Von Gerber =

Von Gerber is a surname. Notable people with the surname include:

- Carl Wilhelm von Gerber (1883–1959), Swedish diplomat
- Carl von Gerber (1931–2013), Swedish sprint canoeist
- Francesca Marlene de Czanyi von Gerber (born 1931), American actress
- Tage von Gerber (1885–1966), Swedish genealogist
- Carl Friedrich von Gerber (1823–1891), German jurist
