= Jan Gerber =

Swiss entrepreneur and mental health executive

Jan Gerber (born 1981) is a Swiss entrepreneur and mental health executive. He is the founder and chief executive officer (CEO) of Paracelsus Recovery, an addiction and mental health clinic based in Zurich.

Gerber previously co-founded the Kusnacht Practice in 2011 before establishing Paracelsus Recovery in 2013.

== Early life and education ==
Gerber was born in 1980 in Switzerland to Werner Gerber, a psychiatrist, and Christine Merzeder, a clinical nurse. Gerber graduated from the London School of Economics with a degree in finance.

== Career ==
Following university, Gerber worked as a financial management consultant for investment banks. In the late 2000s, he launched several start-up businesses, including a cosmetic surgery clinic for men in Zurich.

Gerber entered the mental health field in the late 2000s. In 2011, he and his mother, Christine Merzeder, co-founded the Kusnacht Practice near Zurich, which specialized in single-client residential rehabilitation.

In 2012, Gerber left the Kusnacht Practice to found Paracelsus Recovery. Paracelsus Recovery utilizes a one-person-at-a-time model. Each person is treated individually with privacy. Treatment programs are customized for each individual and typically last four to eight weeks. Upon admission, a person undergoes extensive medical and psychiatric evaluations. Treatment plans integrate psychotherapy, psychiatric care, detoxification, and nutritional therapy. The clinic treats conditions such as addiction, depression, anxiety, and burnout at its Zürich facility or at off-site locations.

== Personal life ==
Gerber lives in Switzerland with his wife, Jil, and his son.
