= Michael Gerber =

Michael Gerber may refer to:

- Michael Gerber (non-fiction writer) (born 1936), American non-fiction writer known for the E-Myth series of books
- Michael Gerber (parodist) (born 1969), American fiction and humor writer known for his Harry Potter parody, Barry Trotter
- Michael Gerber (actor), German actor, as seen in Lichter
- Michael F. Gerber (born 1972), American politician
- Michael Gerber (bishop), German Roman Catholic bishop
- Mike Gerber (born 1992), American professional baseball player
