= Küsnacht =

- Municipality
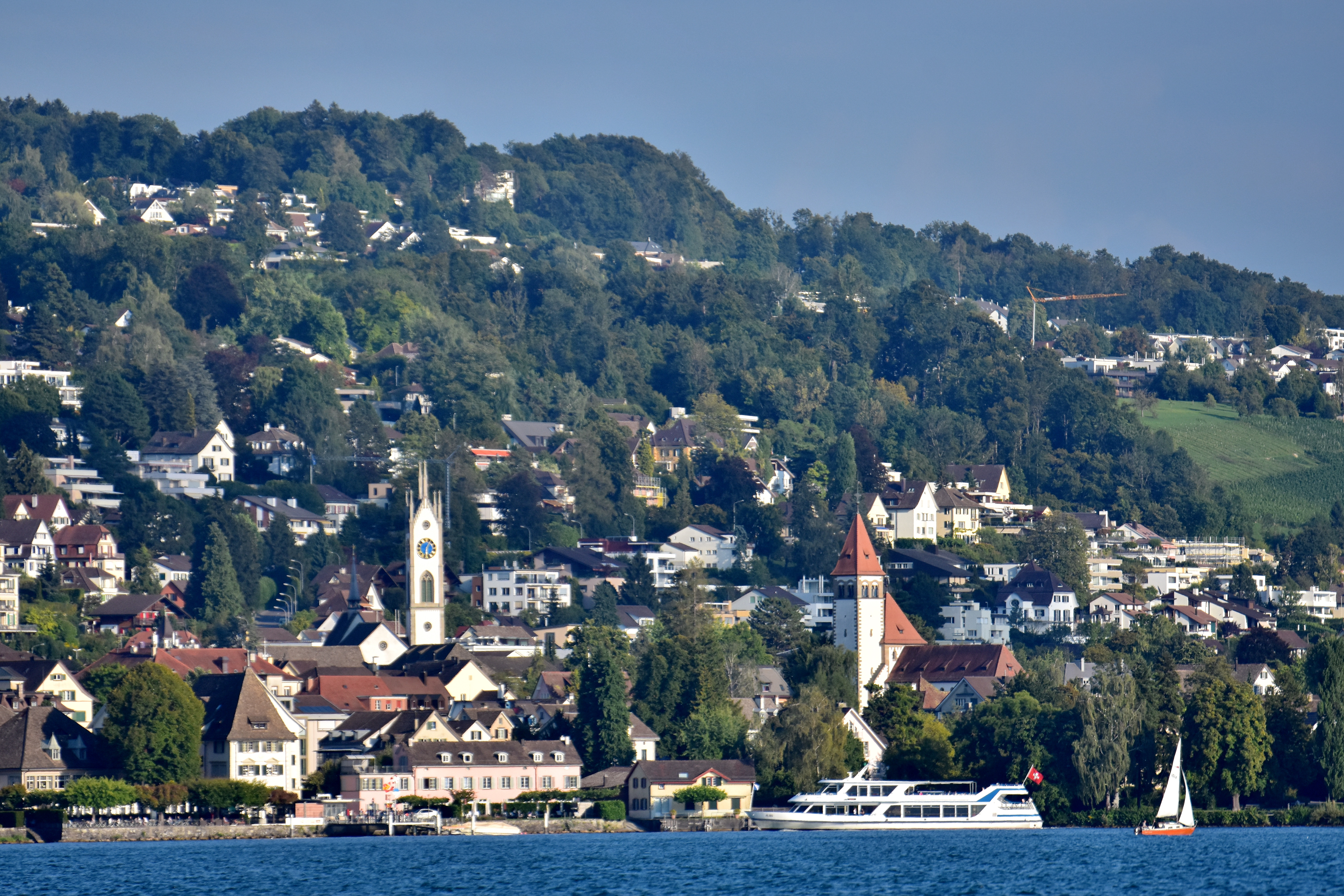
- Küsnacht and Küsnachter Tobel, as seen from ZSG ship MS Helvetia on Lake Zurich in Switzerland

- Flag Coat of arms
- Location of Küsnacht
- Location within Switzerland Location within Canton of Zürich
- Coordinates: 47°19′N 8°35′E
- Country: Switzerland
- Canton: Zürich
- District: Meilen

Government
  - Mayor: Markus Ernst

Area
  - Total: 12.35 km^{2} (4.77 sq mi)
- Elevation: 413 m (1,355 ft)

Population (December 2020)
  - Total: 14,811
  - Density: 1,199/km^{2} (3,106/sq mi)
- Time zone: UTC+01:00 (CET)
  - Summer (DST): UTC+02:00 (CEST)
- Postal code: 8700
- SFOS number: 154
- ISO 3166 code: CH-ZH
- Localities: Goldbach, Heslibach, Itschnach, Küsnachter Berg, Schmalzgrueb, Limberg, Wiserholz, Hohrüti, Wangen, Chaltenstein (Kaltenstein), and Forch
- Surrounded by: Erlenbach, Herrliberg, Kilchberg, Maur, Rüschlikon, Thalwil, Zollikon, Zumikon
- Website: www.kuesnacht.ch

Küsnacht (German pronunciation: [ˈkʏsnaxt]) is a municipality in the district of Meilen in the canton of Zürich, Switzerland.

== History ==
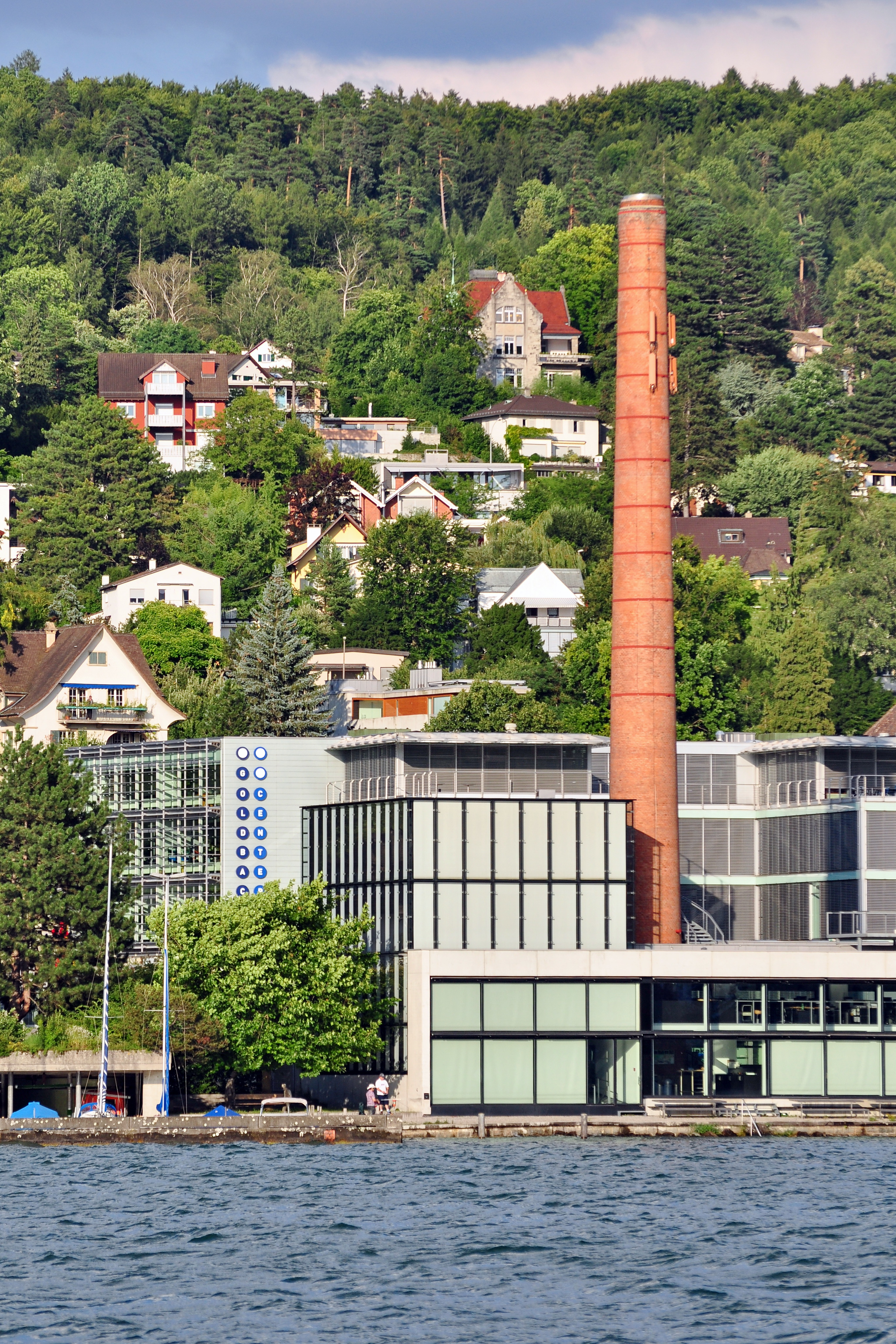
Lakeshore in Bellevue

Küsnacht is first mentioned in 1188 as de Cussenacho.

Earliest findings of settlement date back to the Stone Age. There are also findings from the Bronze Age. During Roman times, a mansion was located on the commons. It was called fundus Cossiniacus which is probably the origin of the name of Küsnacht. In the 7th century the name was recorded as Chussenacho. The coat of arms shows a golden cushion on a red background. It is probably a derivate of the coat of arms of the aristocrats of Küssnacht am Rigi.

In the Middle Ages, the land was governed by the House of Regensberg who lived in the castle of Wulp in Küsnacht. After 1531 Küsnacht was governed by Zürich.

Like most other municipalities along Lake Zurich, Küsnacht started to become a suburb of the city of Zürich with the development of the railway link in 1896.

The psychiatrist Carl Jung had his clinic in Küsnacht, which attracted patients from all over the world. Thomas Mann lived in Küsnacht between 1933 and 1939, after he was forced to leave Germany by the Nazis. Recently, the town's most famous resident was Tina Turner, who lived there until her death in 2023.

== Geography ==
Aerial view from 200 metres (660 ft) by Walter Mittelholzer (1919)

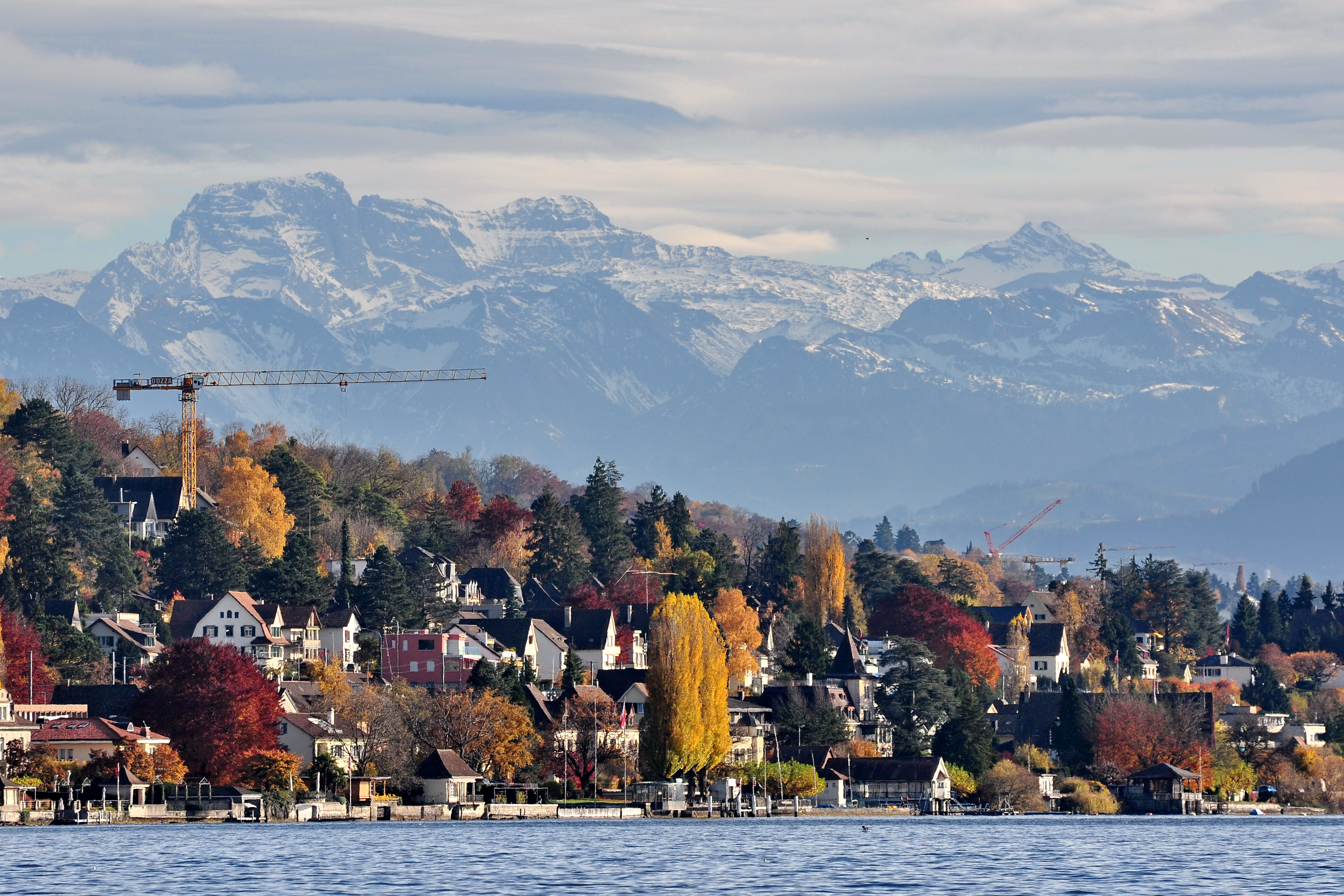
Küsnacht on Zürichsee lakeshore (Switzerland) as seen from Zürichhorn in Zürich-Seefeld, Zürichsee-Schiffahrtsgesellschaft (ZSG) landing gate to the left, Glarus Alps in the background.

Küsnacht has an area of 12.3 km^{2} (4.7 sq mi). Of this area, 34.5% is used for agriculture, while 32.1% is forested. Of the rest of the land, 32.8% is settled (buildings or roads) and the remainder (0.5%) is non-productive (rivers, glaciers or mountains). In 1996, housing and buildings made up 25.6% of the total area, while transportation infrastructure made up the rest (7%). Of the total unproductive area, water (streams and lakes) made up 0.4% of the area. As of 2007 33% of the total municipal area was undergoing some type of construction.

It is located on the north-east bank (also known as Goldküste) of Lake Zurich in the Pfannenstiel region. The local dialect is called Züridütsch.

== Demographics ==
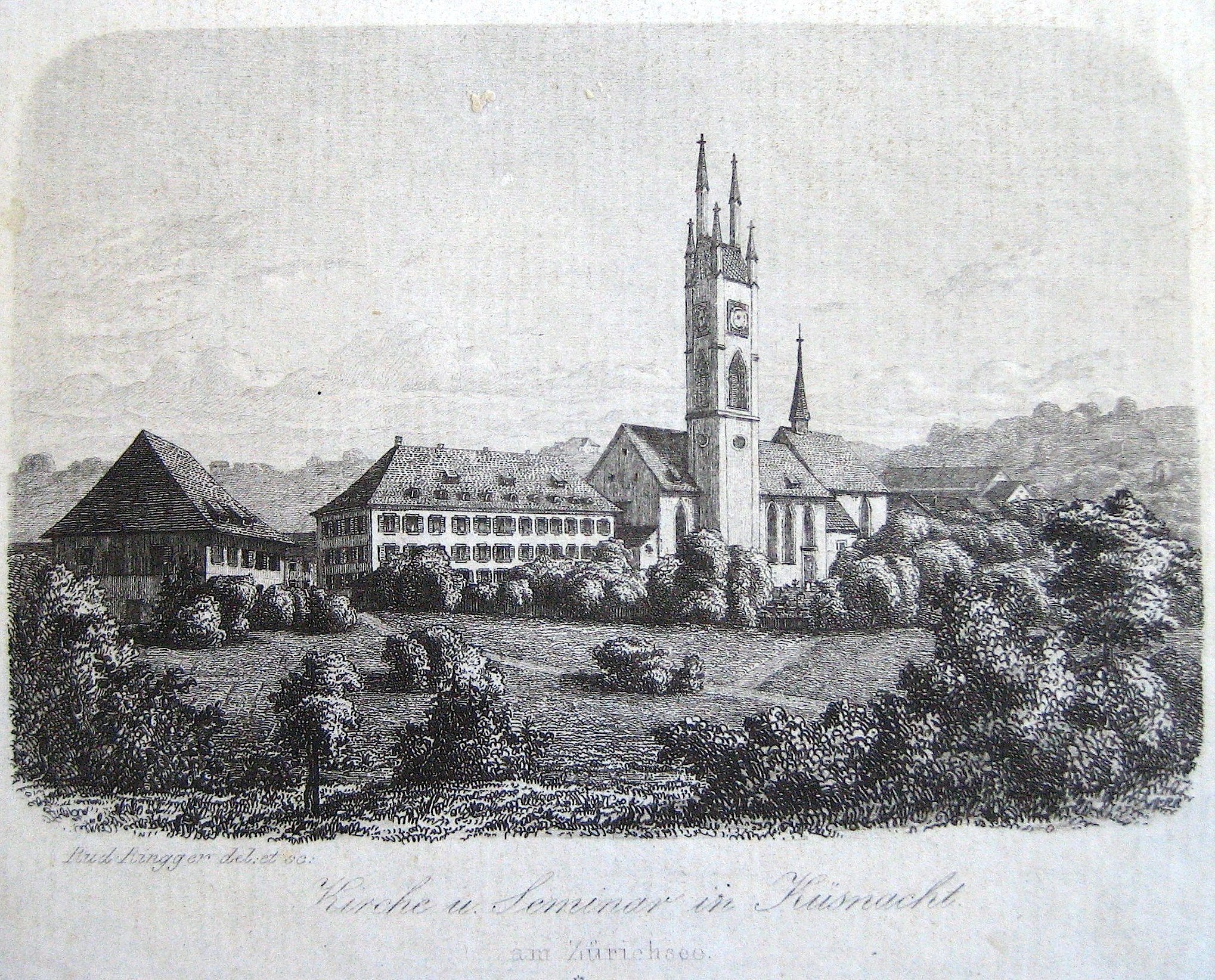
Church and seminary in Küsnacht, by Rudolf Ringger (about 1865)

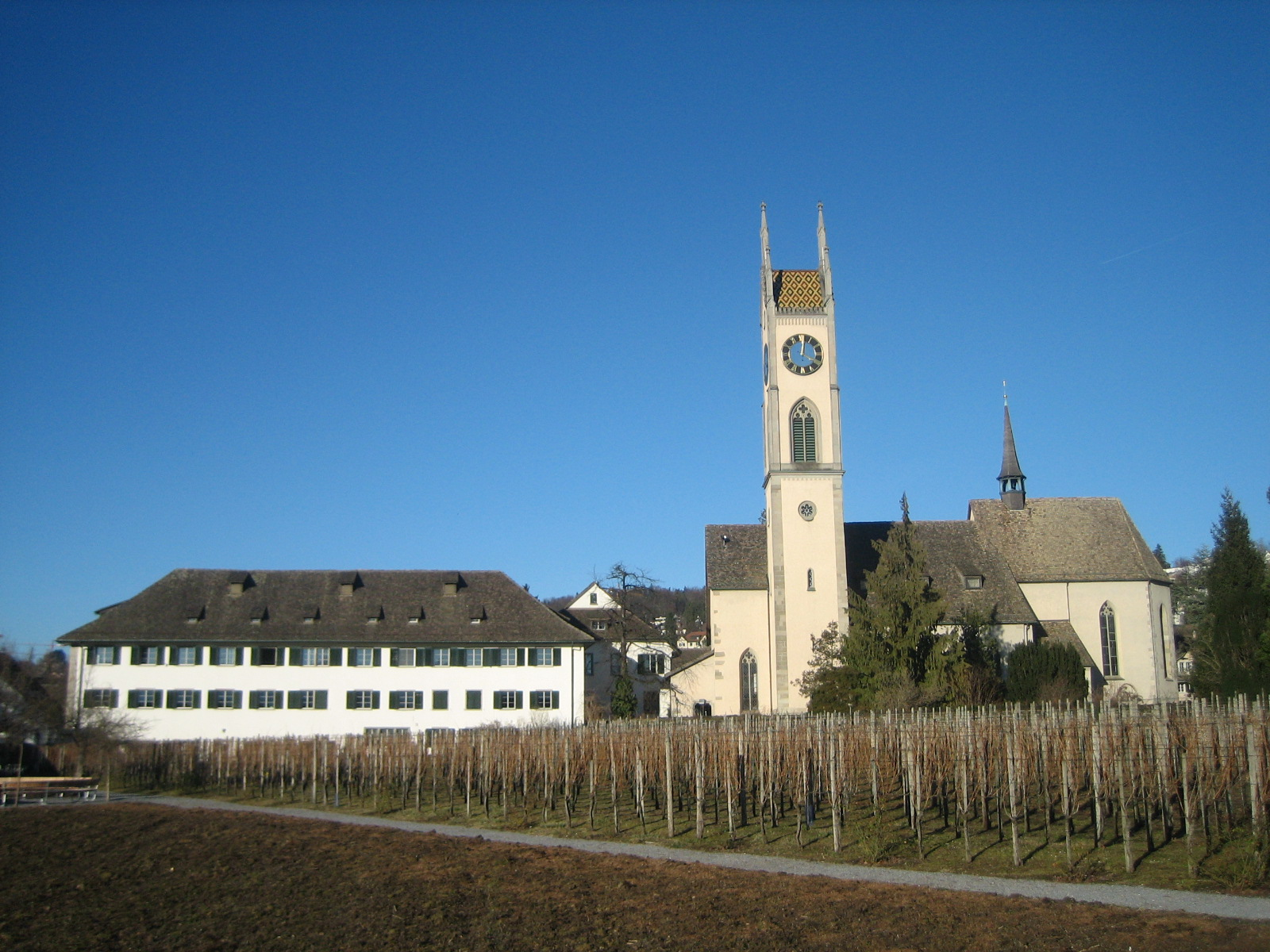
Church and seminary

Küsnacht has a population (as of 31 December 2020) of 14,811. As of 2007, 19.7% of the population was made up of foreign nationals. As of 2008 the gender distribution of the population was 47.4% male and 52.6% female. Over the last 10 years the population has grown at a rate of 6.6%. Most of the population (as of 2000) speaks German (86.1%), with English being second most common (3.6%) and Italian being third (2.5%).

In the 2007 election the most popular party was the SVP which received 32.8% of the vote. The next three most popular parties were the FDP (30.5%), the SPS (12.4%) and the CSP (8.9%).

The age distribution of the population (as of 2000) is children and teenagers (0–19 years old) make up 17.7% of the population, while adults (20–64 years old) make up 59.1% and seniors (over 64 years old) make up 23.2%. In Küsnacht about 84.6% of the population (between age 25–64) have completed either non-mandatory upper secondary education or additional higher education (either university or a Fachhochschule). There are 5843 households in Küsnacht.

Küsnacht has an unemployment rate of 1.51%. As of 2005, there were 167 people employed in the primary economic sector and about 43 businesses involved in this sector. 849 people are employed in the secondary sector and there are 91 businesses in this sector. 3794 people are employed in the tertiary sector, with 664 businesses in this sector. As of 2007 40% of the working population were employed full-time, and 60% were employed part-time.

As of 2008 there were 3578 Catholics and 5417 Protestants in Küsnacht. In the 2000 census, religion was broken down into several smaller categories. From the census, 49.5% were some type of Protestant, with 48% belonging to the Swiss Reformed Church and 1.5% belonging to other Protestant churches. 26.6% of the population were Catholic. Of the rest of the population, 2% were Muslim, 4.4% belonged to another religion (not listed), 3.7% did not give a religion, and 15.2% were atheist or agnostic.

The historical population is given in the following table:

year	population
1467	126 households
1634	1,064
1799	1,512
1850	2,486
1900	3,391
1950	8,920
2000	12,484

== Weather ==
Küsnacht has an average of 136 days of rain per year and on average receives 1,171 mm (46.1 in) of precipitation. The wettest month is August during which time Küsnacht receives 139 mm (5.5 in) of precipitation. During that month, there is precipitation for an average of 12.3 days. The month with the most precipitation days is June, with an average of 13.3 days, and 138 mm (5.4 in) of precipitation.

== Transport ==
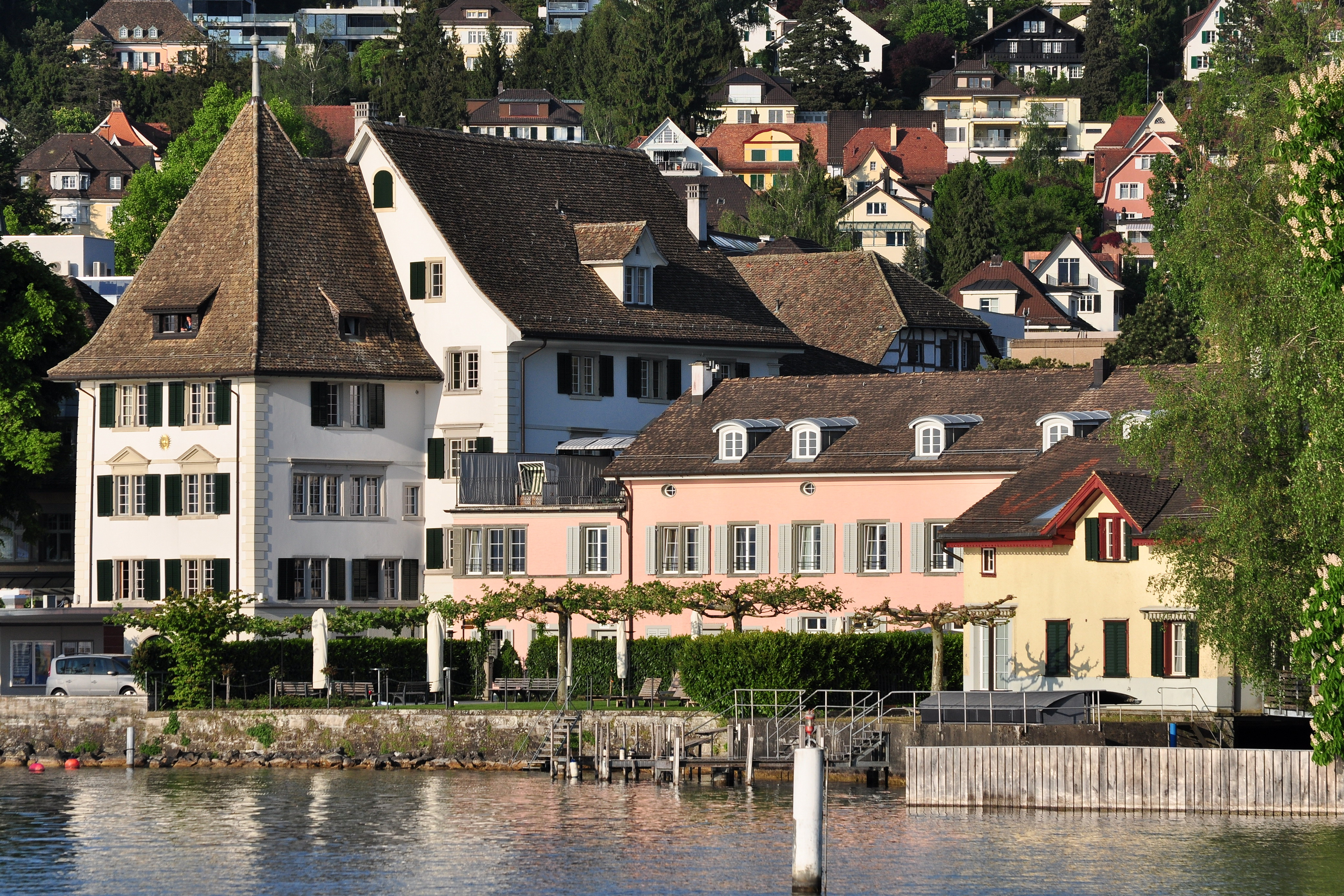
ZSG landing gate on Lake Zürich

There are four railway stations within the municipality of Küsnacht. Küsnacht ZH and Küsnacht Goldbach stations are both on the Lake Zürich right-bank line, and are served by S-Bahn Zürich services S6 and S16. Neue Forch and Forch stations are on the inland Forchbahn line, and are served by service S18.

In the summer there are regular boats to Zürich as well as along the lake to Rapperswil, run by the Zürichsee-Schifffahrtsgesellschaft (ZSG).

== Sports ==
The ZSC Lions' affiliates, the GCK Lions, play in the Swiss League (SL). Their home arena is the 2,200-seat Eishalle Küsnacht.

== Sites of interest ==
Apart from Lake Zurich, popular sites to visit include

- C. G. Jung Institute
- the Cistercian abbey of Kappel am Albis
- Küsnachter Tobel with hiking trails among glacial moraine with rare flora and fauna
- Johanniterkomturei building (today housing the Kantonsschule)
- Oberen Mühle, a mill that now houses the local museum
- Seeclub Küsnacht boathouse dating from at least 1290
- the Church of St Georg (Küsnacht) dating from the 12th century
- Ruins of Wulp Castle
- Küsnachter Horn, a park close to the lake and the Küsnacht ship stop, run by the Zürichsee-Schifffahrtsgesellschaft (ZSG)

== Notable people ==
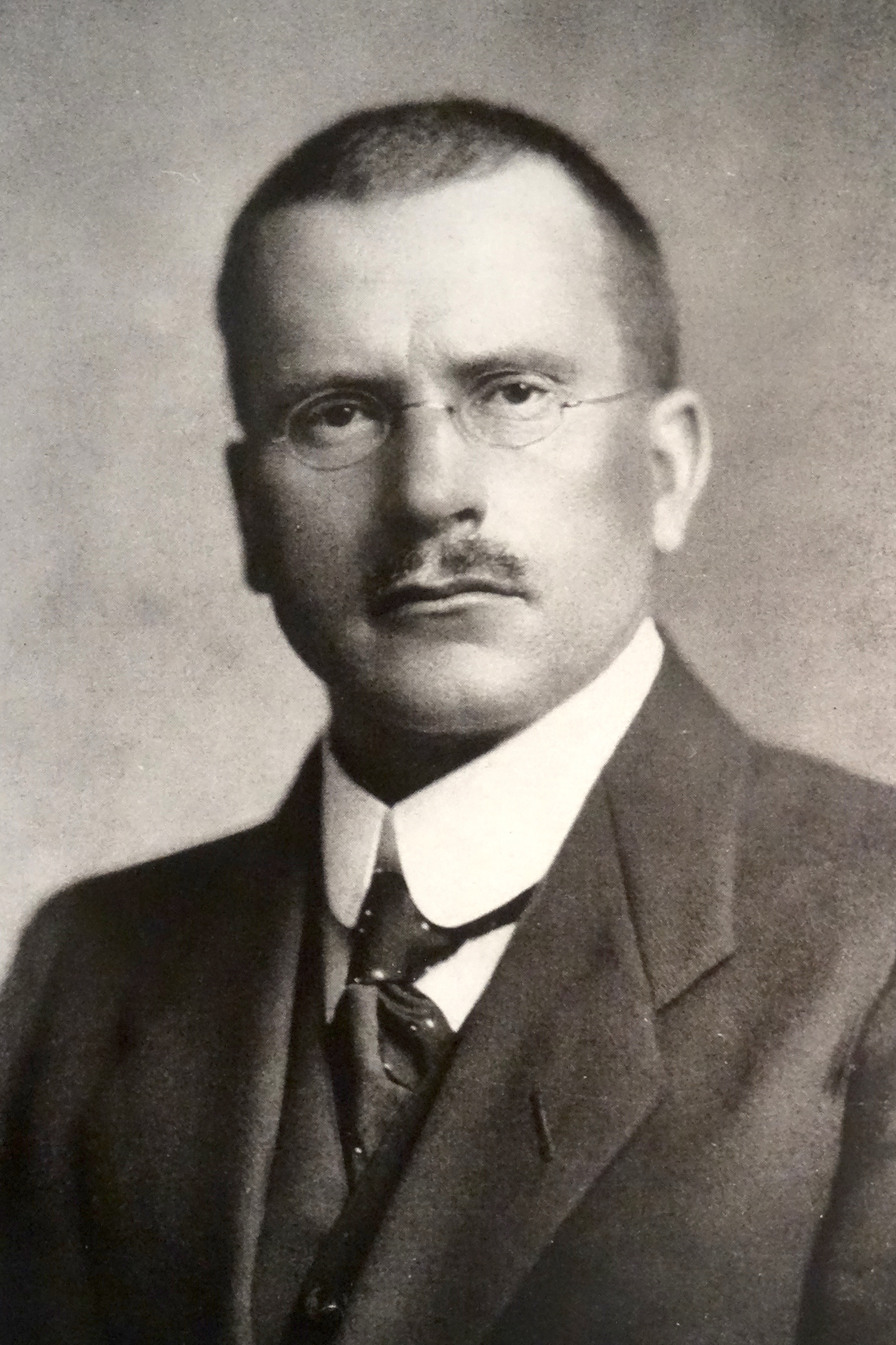
Carl Jung

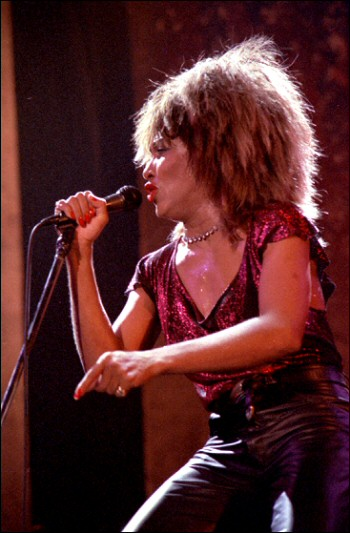
Tina Turner, 1985

=== 19th century ===
- Eugen Sutermeister (1862–1931), graveur and writer, founded the Sonos Society
- Paul Sutermeister (1864–1905), theologian, pastor and editor
- Meinrad Lienert (1865–1933), writer, poet and journalist; died here
- Thomas Mann (1875–1955), writer, lived here 1933–1939
- Carl Jung (1875–1961), psychiatrist and founder of Analytical psychology; lived and died here
- Emma Jung (1882–1955), heiress, psychoanalyst and writer; lived and died here
- Albin Zollinger (1895–1941), writer; educated here

=== 20th century ===
- Albert Frey-Wyssling (1900–1988), botanist
- Bernard von Brentano (1901–1964), German writer, poet and playwright; lived here 1933–1949
- Hermann Haller, (1914–2002) composer; taught here
- Marie-Louise von Franz (1915–1998), Jungian psychologist and scholar; lived and died here
- Tina Turner (1939–2023), American-born singer and entertainer, lived here from 1994 and died here
- Ursula Biemann (born 1955), video artist, curator and art theorist
- Rolf Dörig (born 1957), entrepreneur; lives here
- Mario Fehr (born 1958), politician
- Monisha Kaltenborn (born 1971), the former team principal of the Sauber Formula One team; lives here

=== Sports ===
- Severino Minelli (1909–1994), footballer
- Martin Studach (1944–2007), rower
- Karl Grob (1946–2019), footballer
