= Alt-Regensberg Castle =

Alt-Regensberg
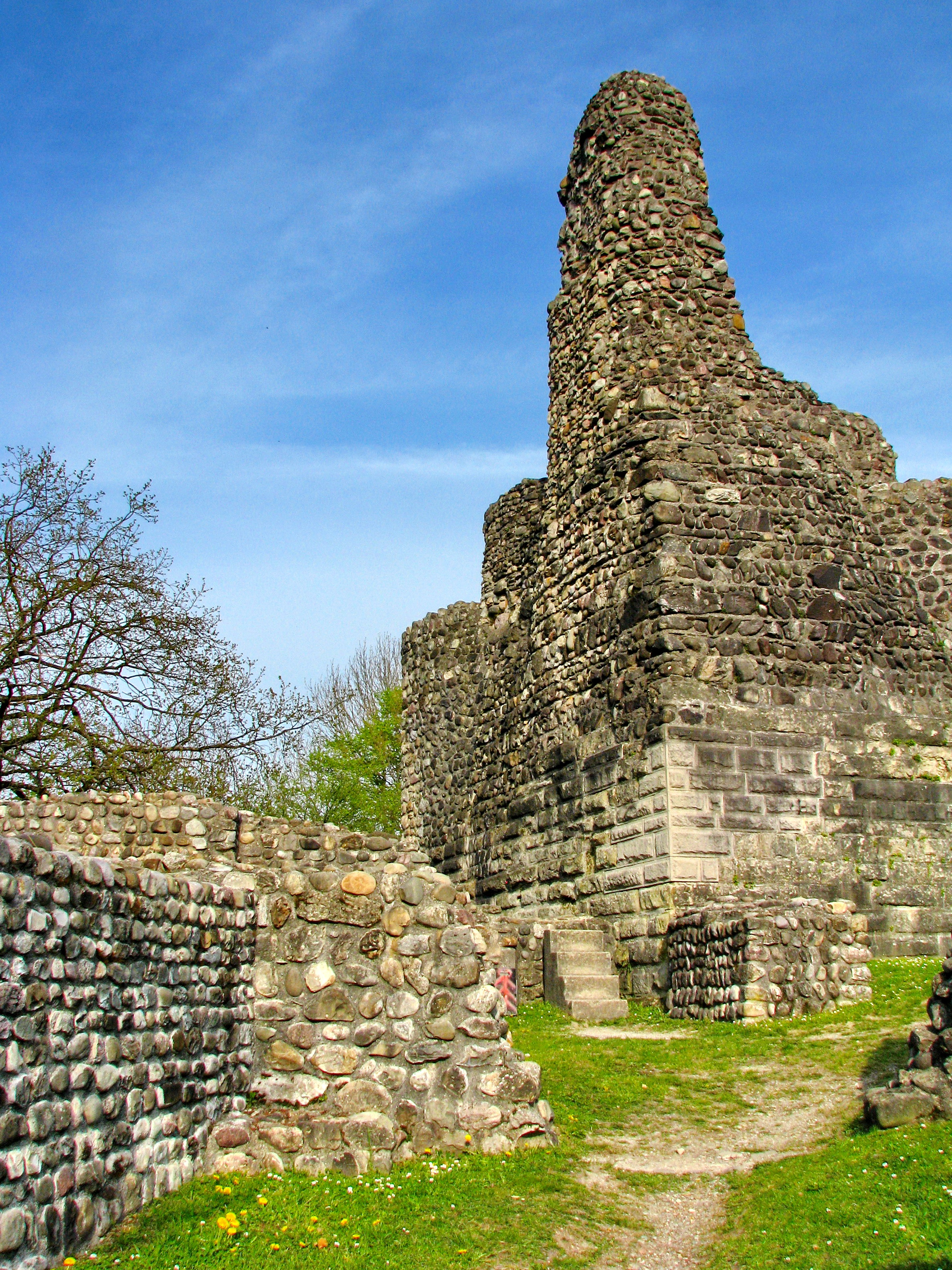
- Ruins of the keep of Alt-Regensberg Castle

- Location within Canton of Zürich Alt-Regensberg Castle (Switzerland)

General information
- Architectural style: hill castle
- Classification: Historic monument, ruined castle, but conserved and partially reconstructed in 1955/57 and in the 1980s
- Location: Regensdorf, Switzerland
- Coordinates: 47.428571°N 8.48202°E
- Construction started: ~ 1050

Alt-Regensberg Castle (Swiss German: Ruine Alt-Regensberg also referred to Altburg) is a hill castle which was built about the mid-11th century AD by the House of Regensberg in the Swiss municipality of Regensdorf in the Canton of Zürich.

== Geography ==
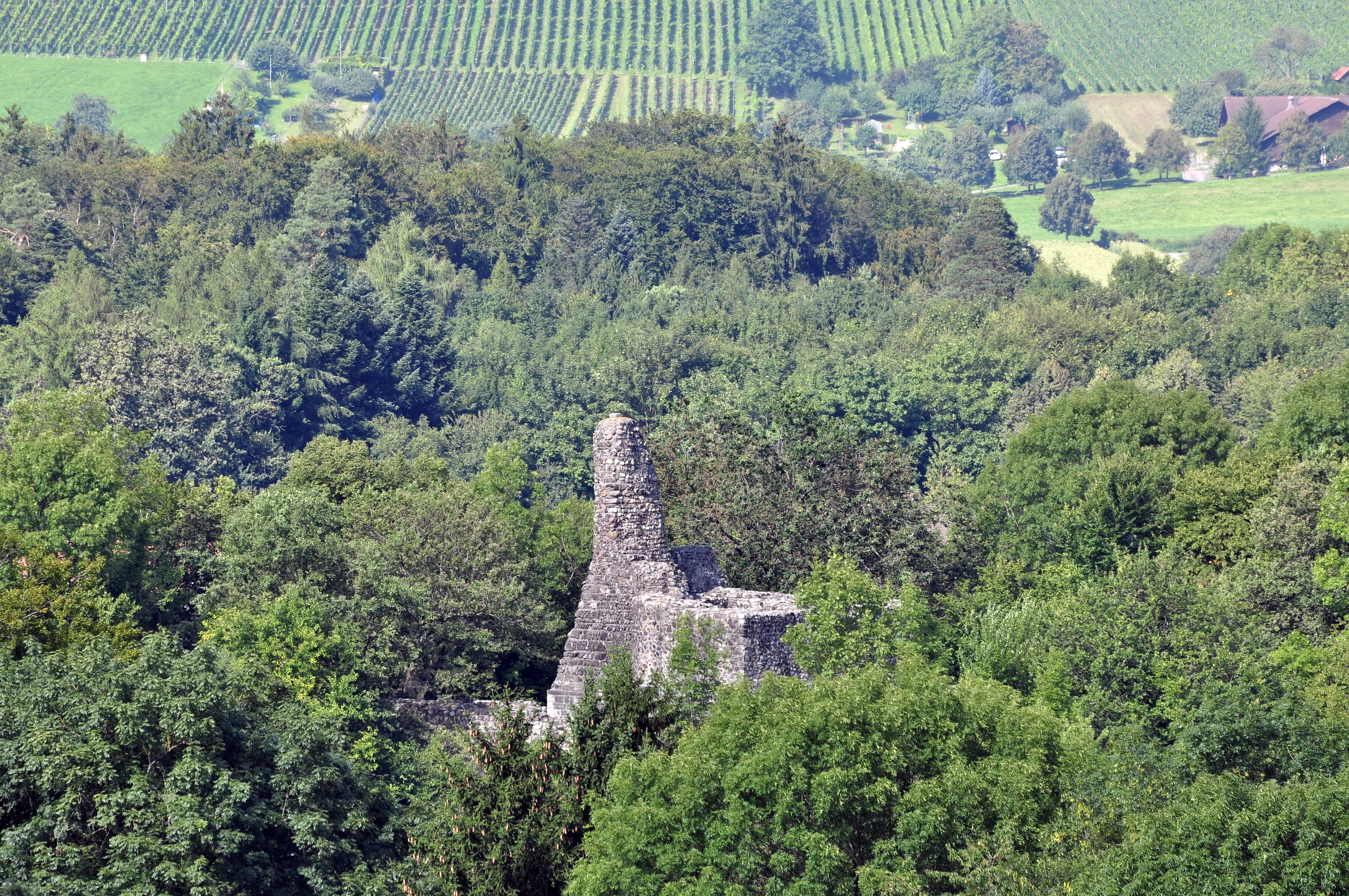
the moraine hill of the ruined castle

The ancestral seat of the House of Regensberg was erected on a roughly 30 m (98 ft) high moraine hill and comprises a roughly hexagonal area of about 45 metres (148 ft) from west to east and 40 metres (131 ft) from south to north. The remains of the castle are located in Altburg, a locality of the municipality of Regensdorf in the Canton of Zürich. On its northwestern slope the small village of Altburg is situated, nearby the municipal boundary to Zürich-Affoltern and the Katzensee protected area.

== Archaeological exploration ==
The ruins were scientifically examined between 1955 and 1957. The archaeological findings showed four stages of construction: 11th and 12th century, as well as from 1180 to 1330 by the House of Regensberg, and about 1350 to 1458 by the Landenberg-Greifensee family, and the fourth construction phase from 1458 to 1468 by the then first private owner. The oldest finds suggest a first construction phase in the second half of the 11th century. The still visible massive walls of up to 4 metres (13 ft) width correspond to the essential features of the state after the third building phase. The excavated portions of the ruins, down to the bedrock, correspond to the living horizon of the first inhabitants of the mid-11th-century site.

== Architecture ==
=== Keep and palas ===
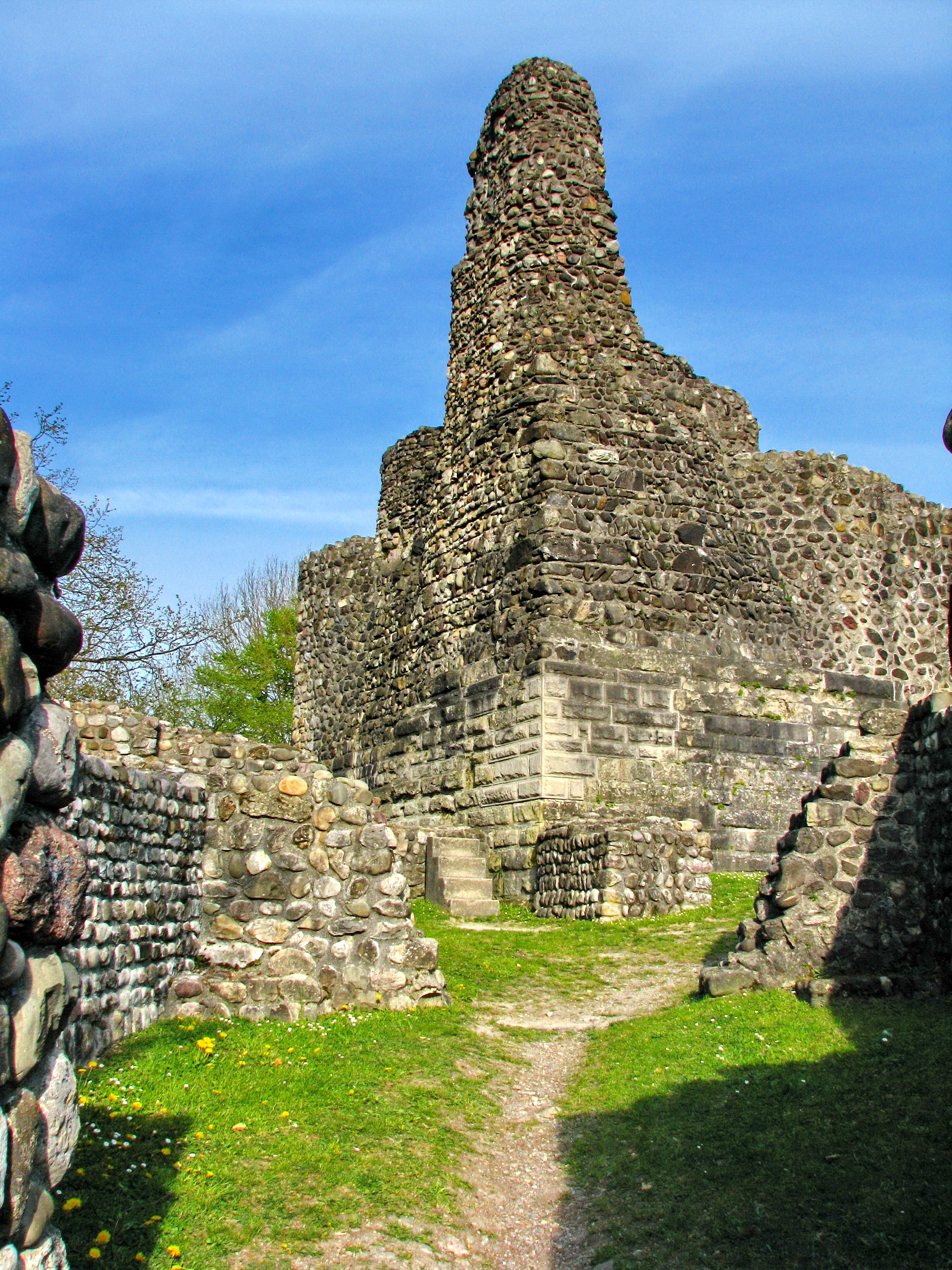
the ill-reconstructed entrance area towards the kepp

The quadratic keep measures about 9 metres (30 ft) with about 3 metres (10 ft) thick walls and dates from the first construction phase. Its foundation goes about 4 metres (13 ft) below the earth's surface, and it is completely filled up to the surface-accessible at height of about 5.5 metres (18 ft). This massive construction should prevent that besiegers undermined the tower. The lowest floor was lit by wall slots. The elevated entrance was on the west side of the tower and was originally accessible by a ladder and a simple wooden platform. Later, there was a staircase in the north-west corner up to the entrance. The exterior of the residential tower has been transformed remarkably over the years. The outer casing of the 11th-century structure was filled with boll stones and mounted in horizontal mortar joints strokes. By 1200 the entire outer surface was chipped away and replaced with carefully edited boss squares. The whole tower thus received a much more upmarket appearance.

In the northern part of the complex is a rectangular foundation wall leaning against the perimeter wall. Here arose in the 12th or early 13th century wooden buildings that served as stables and outbuildings. They were moved to the south and replaced by a palas in the course of the 14th century claimed the whole area between keep and circular wall in the northeastern area. The residential construction had two 2 metres (7 ft) wide cross walls to the west and south. Later the palas was expanded to the south. At the site the reservoir that was built in 1919, was a massive stone building serving as a cellar and storage since the 13th century.

=== Circular wall and access to the castle ===
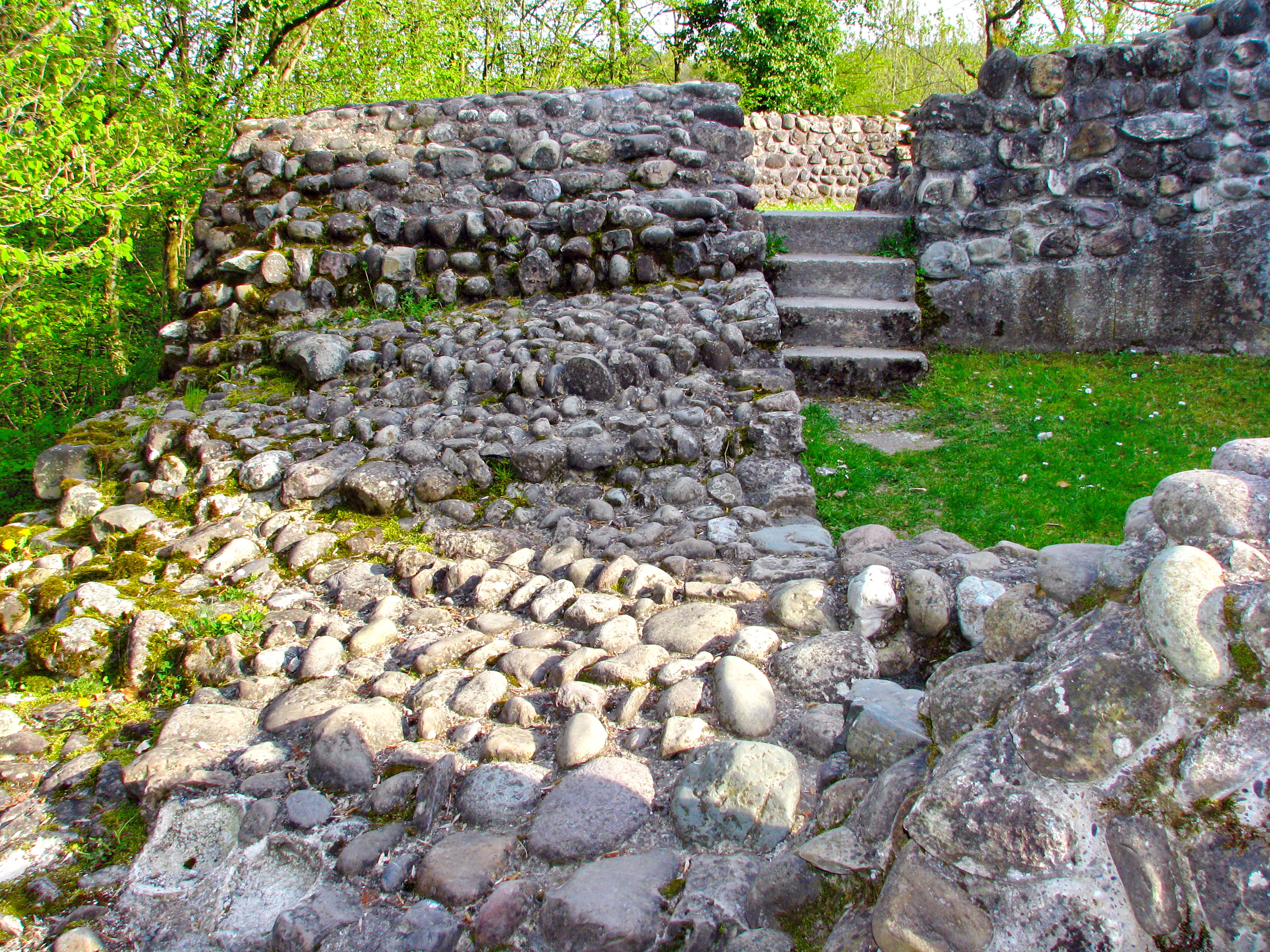
remains of the circular wall

To the northwest the entrance to the castle was situated, but the reconstruction of the circulary walls erroneously assumed that the entrance originally was built slightly south. Just behind the walled entrance, the foundations of the kennel were set being a second and internal access to the castle's interior. It was built around the mid-13th century. In the eastern part of the wall the foundations are strikingly deep and visibly strengthened at the corners because this was part of the earliest water supply. The cistern was about six 6 metres (20 ft) deep and was abandoned at the time when the kennel was built. There is a good case to believe that a 2 metres (7 ft) meter deep hole initially remained open, perhaps designed as a pitfall in case of an attack. In the early days, the castle was surrounded by a palisade. Only at the end of the 12th century a circular wall was built which rested on a 2 metres (7 ft) wide foundation. It was repeatedly repaired over time, increased and reinforced where it had to bear the 14th-century palace walls.

=== Water supply ===
The water supply for the castle was carried out with particular care. The oldest water pit was abandoned when the kennel was built, and replaced by the cistern in the southwest corner of the facility. Rainwater near the roofs was collected in a large plant of 6.5 m (21 ft) in diameter and was sealed with clay. After flown through a layer of gravel, the filtered water was collected in the central bay and could be scooped with a boiler. The last inhabitant of the castle built a new water supply on the ground floor of the palace, on the east side of the keep, which collected rainwater from the roofs, and a canal to irrigate obsolete water outside of the perimeter wall.

== History ==
The so-called Hunfried document of 1044 AD mentions among others a witness named Lütold von Affoltern who is suspected as the builder of the castle. Lütold I von Regensberg was mentioned in 1088 on occasion of a war against the Abbot of St. Gallen, and the next inhabitants of the castle may have been Lütold II, his wife Judenta and their son Lütold III who donated lands to build a nunnery, the Fahr Abbey in 1130. Another inhabitant of the castle, Lütold IV, along with the House of Rapperswil, became the founder of the Rüti Abbey in 1206. A visible sign of the upturn of the House of Regensberg was the decisive transformation of the castle as high medieval aristocratic residence with circular walls made of stone instead of palisades, and the elaborate shell of the keep. After the construction of Neu-Regensberg by Lütold V, in 1255 an inheritance occurred: Lütold VI retained the ancestral castle and the extensive free float, his brother Ulrich received Neu-Regensberg and the possessions in the Limmattal. In the second half of the 13th century many pledges and sales are documented, and after the so-called Regensberg feud (Regensberger Fehde) in 1267/68 the family declined: The city of Zürich and Rudolf von Habsburg who later became king should have destroyed respectively conquered with adventurous lists the surrounding Regensberg castles. Around 1290 Lütold VII had already left his home castle, but maybe up to his death in 1320 he settled again on Alt-Regensberg. The last representative of Neu-Regensberg returned to the ancestral castle, after they had sold the castle and town of Neu-Regensberg in 1302. In 1321 Lütold IX sealed the last document at Altburg castle.

Around 1354 Hermann von Landenberg-Greifensee lived at Alt-Regensberg. He and his successors massively rebuilt the castle, raised the walls and filled the castle grounds in the south and east. The decisive changes also included the construction of the palace and the new stables, maybe by Ulrich and his wife Verena von Altenklingen around 1386. On 2 September 1407 Uolrich von Landenberg von Griffense der Älteste and his son Walther confirmed the conditions to sell the castle, rights and lands to the city of Zürich. The decline in importance of the castle had been shown already in the Old Zürich War, when Zürich's opponent Alt-Regensberg occupied without resistance. Martin von Landenberg-Greifensee died in 1442, whereupon his daughter Martha inherited the castle. After she married Johann Schwend, a citizen of Zürich, the couple sold the castle to the merchant Rudolf Mötteli on 4 February 1458. With great effort, he re-designed especially the interior of the castle. In his report Mötteli wrote to have installed six heatable rooms that he had provided with belt floors and wood paneling, glass windows, stove tiles, a new oven and a deeper cellar. Ten years later, Luzern whose citizen Mötteli became, supported the claims of the city of Zürich on Alt-Regensberg. Therefore, the castle came with what was left of the former rights and lands to the city of Zürich and became part of the Herrschaft Regensberg, but the castle itself disintegrated. The ruins henceforth had to serve as a quarry: in 1705 to build the church of Regensdorf and in 1775 for the construction of the bridge of Adlikon. Yet in 1897 a complete demolition of the ruins was planned, but in 1902 and 1909 first backup masonry work were done. Nevertheless, in 1919 the castle area was rebuilt into a water reservoir for the hamlet of Altburg. As a result of the extensive archaeological investigations in 1955/57, the area was excavated and conserved, and since the 1980s, the Canton of Zürich repeatedly executed wall coatings to preserve the most important castle in the Zürich Unterland from further decay. Today, the site of the castle, but not the castle's hill, are the property of the Canton of Zürich.

== House of Regensberg ==
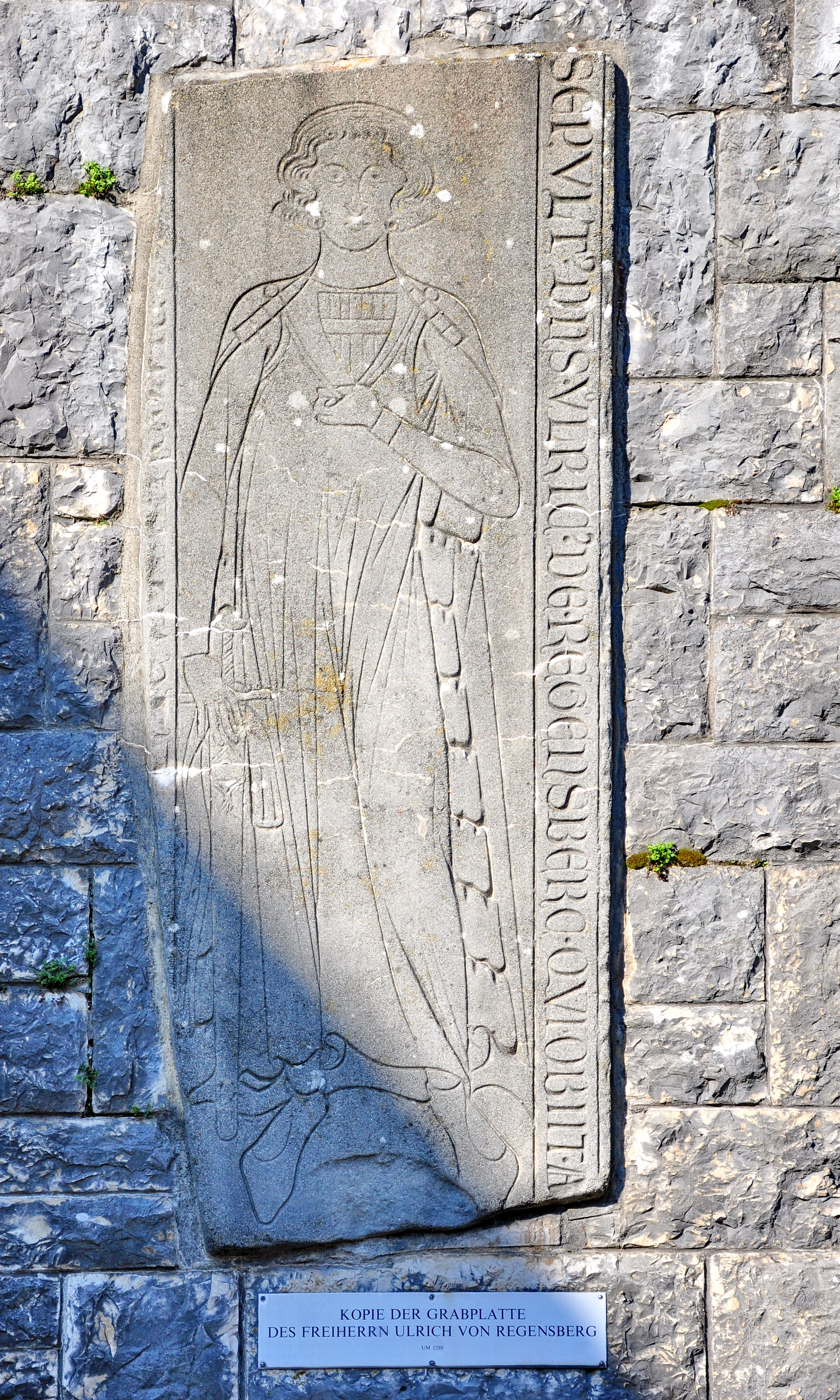
Replic of the gravestone of Ulrich I von Regensberg at the Neu-Regensberg Castle.

Around 1050 Alt-Regensberg was built and it became the ancestral castle of the Regensburg family. The heartland of the Regensberg possessions was in the Furt, Surb and Wehntal valleys besides the Lägern chain. Other assets and rights were in the Limmat and Reppisch valleys, in Zürcher Oberland, in the Pfannenstiel area, also sporadically in the present Thurgau and north of the Rhein river and on Bodensee lake shore. The house's significant position founded on marriage relations with the noble houses of Kyburg, Rapperswil-Habsburg-Laufenburg, Neuchâtel and Pfirt. Two monastic foundations date back to the House of Regensberg: Around 1130 Lütold II and his wife Judenta and his son Lütold III founded the Fahr Abbey, and with the foundation of Rüti Abbey in 1206 the family probably secured lands of the first extinction of the Alt-Rapperswil family around 1192. Shortly after the founding of the town of Grüningen, Lütold VI established a private service nobility from the 1240s, and to the middle of the century, he founded the town of Regensberg and the new ancestral seat Neu-Regensberg and the small town of Glanzenberg. The Regensberger feud against the Habsburgs and the neighbouring city of Zürich in 1267/68 lead to the decline of the family that became extinct between 1302 and 1331.

== Cultural heritage ==
The building is listed in the Swiss inventory of cultural property of national and regional significance as a Class B object of regional importance.
