= Küsnachter Tobel =

River in Switzerland

Coordinates: 47°19′06.46″N 8°35′27.78″E

Küsnachter Tobel (lit. 'Küsnacht Gorge') is a small river canyon or gorge, respectively, on the southwestern slope of the Pfannenstiel mountain in the canton of Zürich, Switzerland, formed by the Küsnachter Dorfbach (lit. 'Küsnacht village creek'), which drains into Lake Zurich.

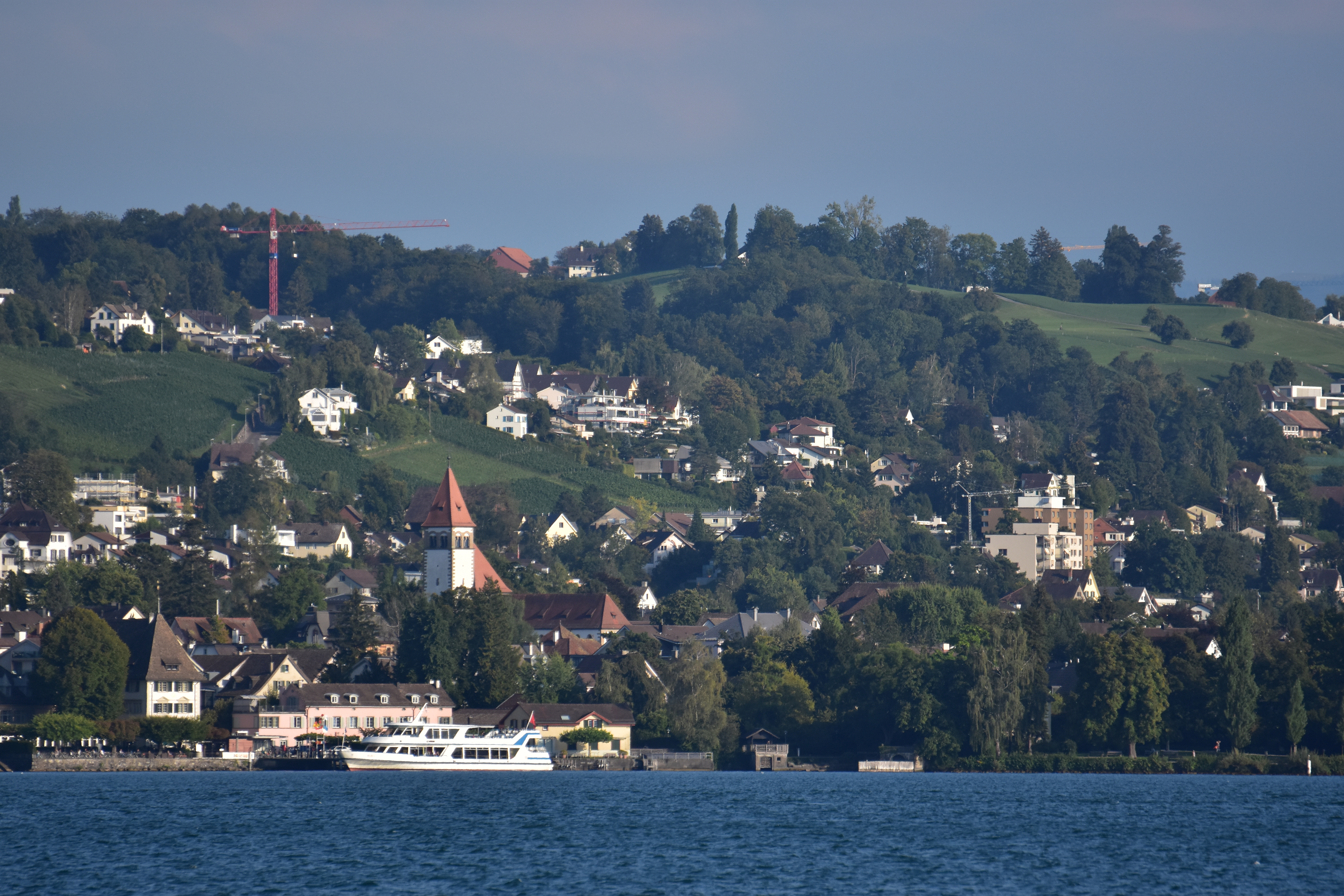
Küsnachter Tobel and Küsnacht as seen from Zürichsee-Schifffahrtsgesellschaft (ZSG) ship MS Helvetia

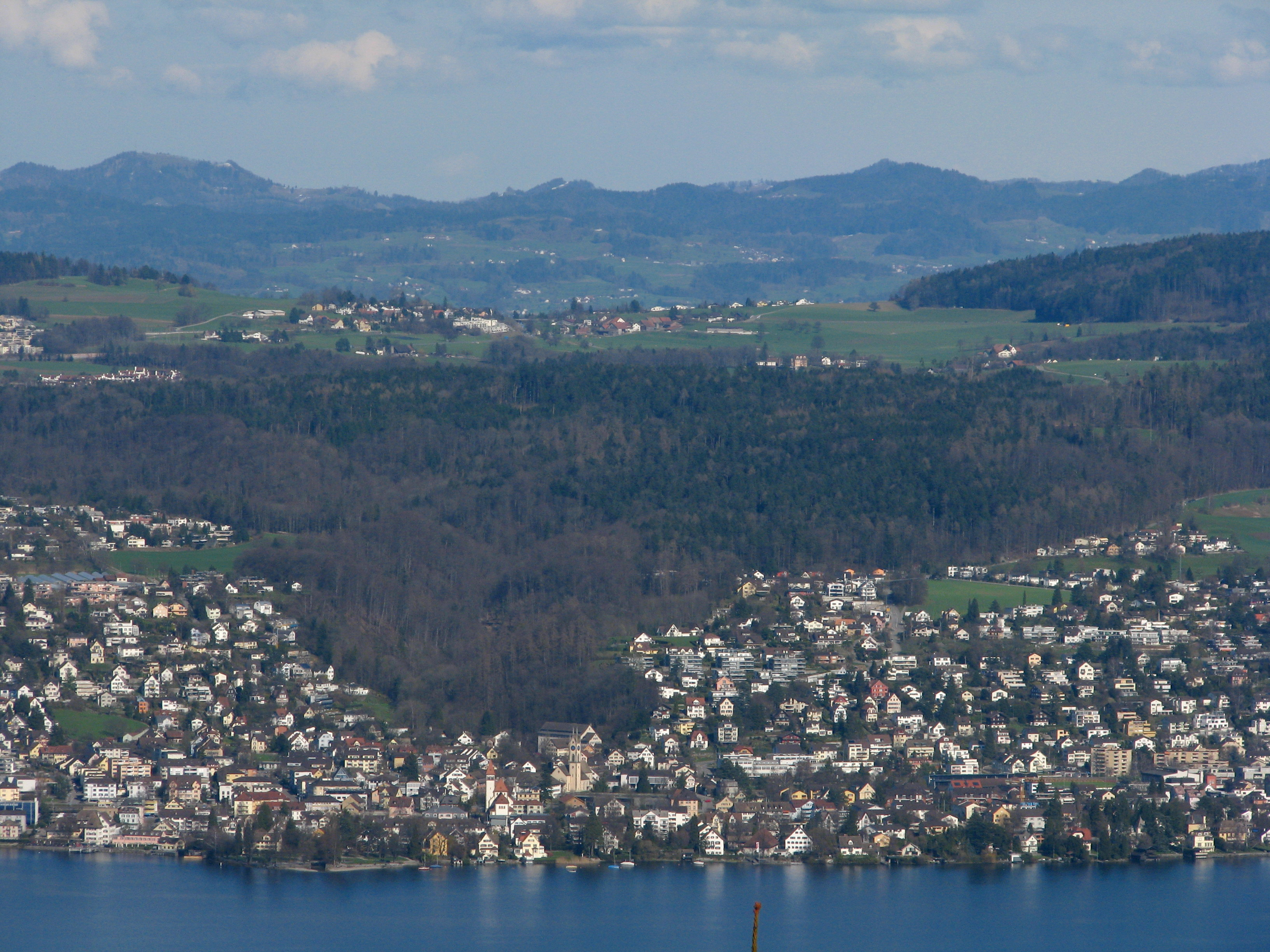
Küsnachter Tobel, Küsnacht and Zürichsee as seen from Felsenegg

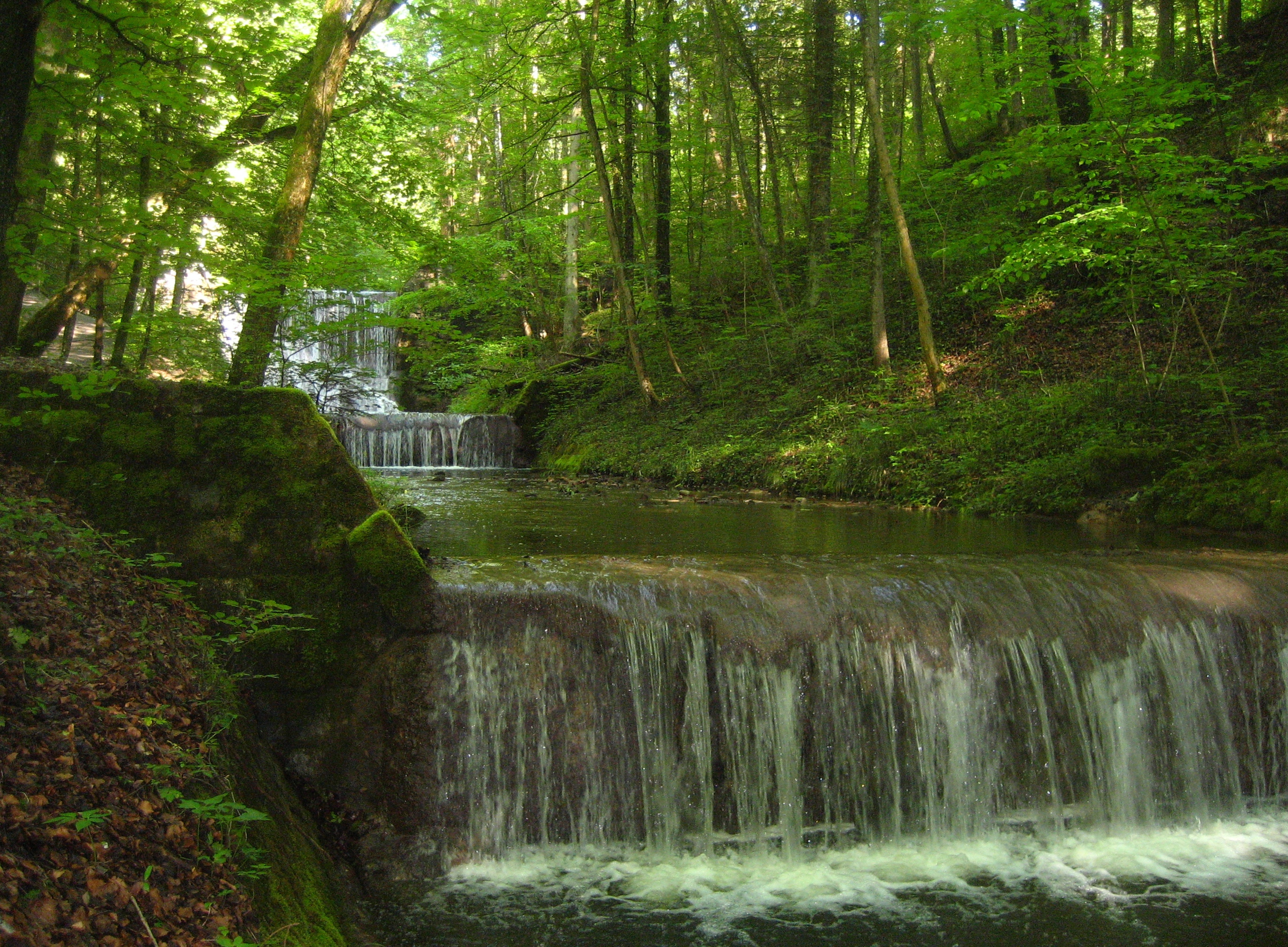

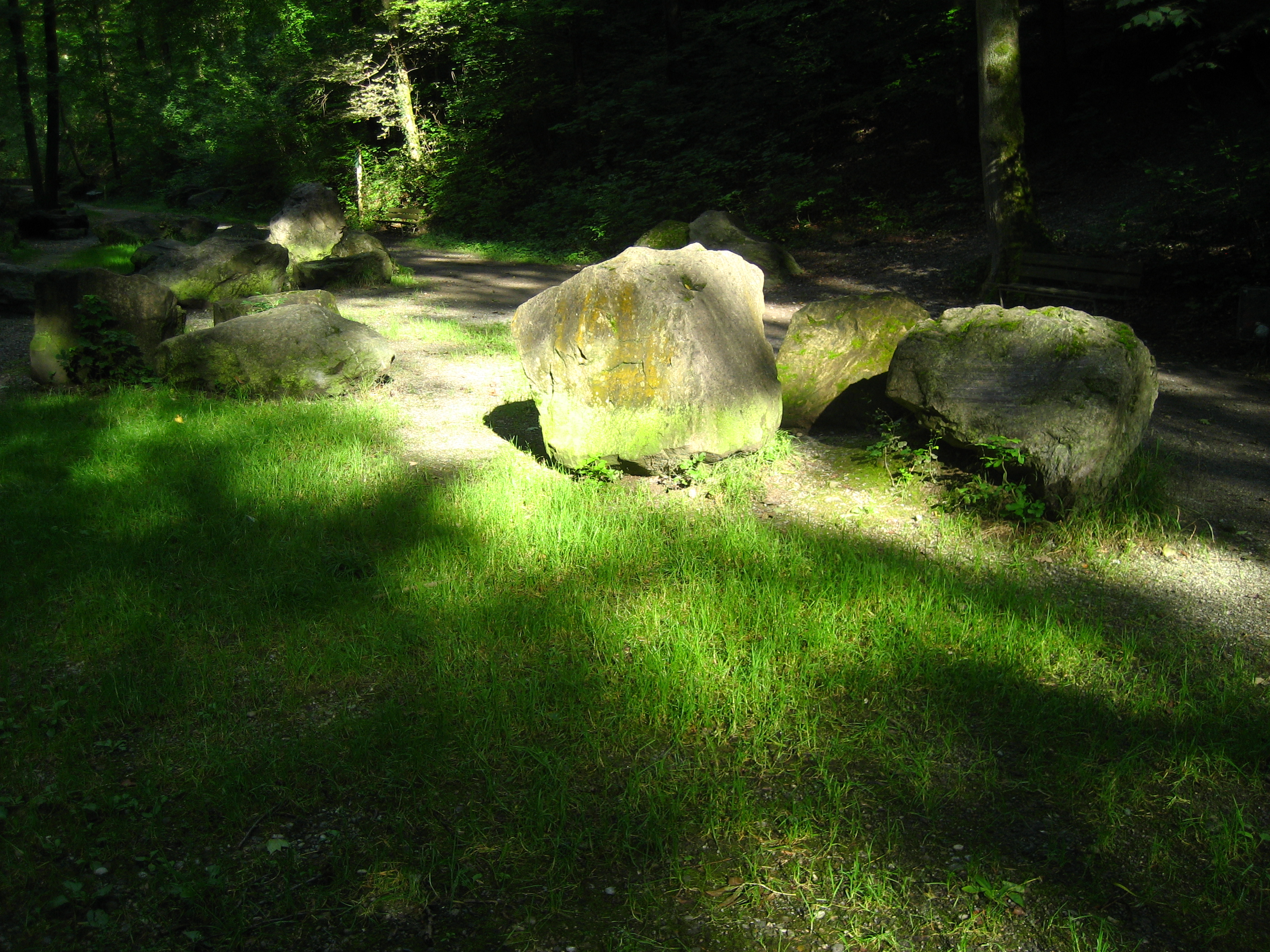
some of the smaller glacial erratics

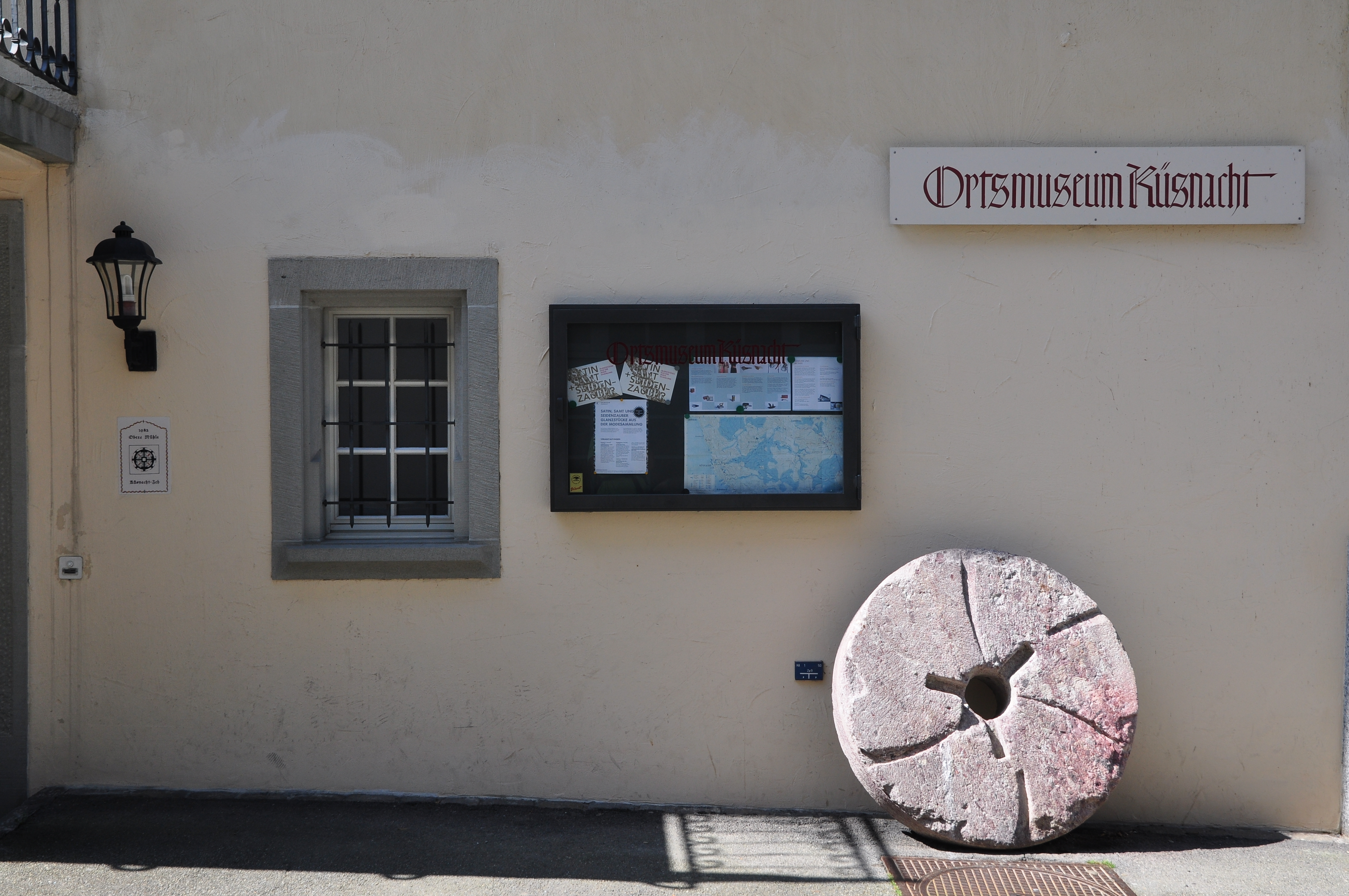
Ortsmuseum Küsnacht, a former mill and now the museum of local history.

== Geography ==
Located on the southwestern slope of the Pfannenstiel mountain chain, and originating nearby the locality Forch respectively historical mountain pass of the same name, the small Dorfbach stream flows in the Zürichsee at the municipality of Küsnacht on Zürich lakeshore, forming there a river delta and the peninsula on which Küsnacht was partially built. The stream formed in the past thousands of years an about 12 kilometres (7 mi) long, but widely just about 20 metres (66 ft) to 50 metres (164 ft) wide canyon.

== Attractions ==
The main attraction in the up to 70-metre-deep (230 ft) incised gorge is the wild, primeval landscape. Sometimes rock slides occur there, the last on 24 April 2013 when a 250-tonne (551,156 lb) boulder crashed on the pathway. Nevertheless, the pathway is very popular for hiking, usually starting in Forch and ending at the landing gate of the Zürichsee lake transportation company Zürichsee-Schifffahrtsgesellschaft (ZSG) in Küsnacht. Points of interest include the so-called Drachenhöhle towards the Wulp Castle (built by the House of Regensberg) besides the gorge: The literally Dragon's Den is a small cave that was washed out of the glacial Nagelfluh conglomerate.

The so-called Dorfbach stream is also one of the most important spawning grounds for lake trout, although the number of spawning animals was as of 2013 very modest. Some glacial erratics respectively the so-called Findlingsgarten at the lower end of the gorge towards Küsnacht, as well as the idyllic landscape, are further points of attraction. Towards Küsnacht there is the local historical museum and the historical core of Küsnacht. The museum is a former historical mill, located at the southern entrance of the ravine. The early medieval Zehntenhaus granary on the lake shore is another attraction to be mentioned.

== Historical floods ==
Protagonist of the idyllic natural spectacle of the Küsnachter Tobel is the so-called Küsnachter Dorfbach, a small stream, but in earlier times very dangerous: The hypocritical rippling through the standardized streambed little water, emerged several times, so a document of 1678 mentions for the first time a major flood with human losses. And again in 1778, after massive rains, the villagers of Küsnacht–Goldbach were caught sleeping, and 63 deaths and great damage to property occurred; after this disaster the natural, meandering stream course through the village was forced in a dead straight channel. Once more 100 years later, after heavy rains, the water accumulated at a too low-lying bridge and formed a breaking roller water, with high damage but without human losses.

== Transportation ==
Forch is provided by the Forchbahn tram from Zürich-Stadelhofen (Sechseläutenplatz) or Esslingen, Küsnacht by the S-Bahn Zürich lines S6 (ZVV) and S16 (ZVV), as well as by the autobus line 910 and the local bus transportation. In the summer there are about every 30 minutes regular boats from and to Zürich as well as along the lake to Rapperswil, run by the Zürichsee-Schifffahrtsgesellschaft (ZSG).

== See also ==
- List of gorges
- List of rivers of Switzerland
