= Meinrad Lienert =

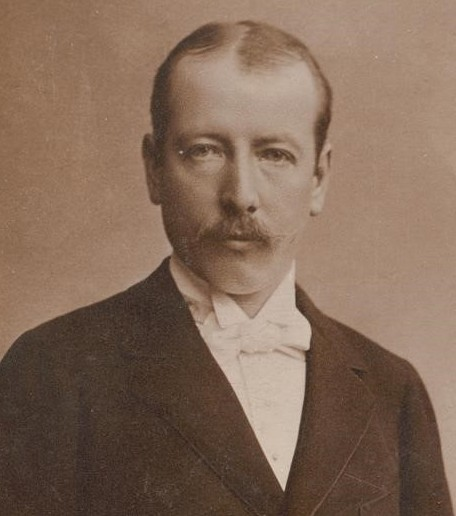
- Born: 21 May 1865; Einsiedeln, Switzerland
- Died: 26 December 1933 (aged 68); Küsnacht, Switzerland
- Occupations: Writer, poet, journalist
- Spouse: Maria Magdalena Josefina Gyr
- Writing career
- Language: Swiss German, German
- Period: 1891–1933

Meinrad Lienert (21 May 1865 – 26 December 1933) was a Swiss writer, poet and journalist. He was most noted for his works in the Swiss German language.

== Life and work ==
After finishing his studies of law, Lienert became notary in his native town of Einsiedeln. Together with two partners he then took over the local newspaper Einsiedler Anzeiger in 1891 and became its editor.

In 1899 he moved to Zürich where he was initially the editor of the newspaper Die Limmat but later established himself as an independent writer. In 1919 he returned to journalism becoming the editor of the "Zürcher Volkszeitung". In the same year he received an honorary doctorate from the University of Zurich. In 1923 he returned to his native town of Einsiedeln. On 26 December 1933 he died in Küsnacht.

Meinrad Lienert published his first stories in Swiss German in the Neue Zürcher Zeitung. These were later published under the name Flüehblüemli (1891). The poem collection s Schwäbelpfyffli (1906, 1913, 1920) belongs to his most important dialect works. Apart from that he wrote countless short stories and novels in standard German. The most important are: Swiss Tales and Heroic Stories (1914), The King of Euland (1928), The Double Mathias and his Daughters (1929).
