= Lichter =

Lichter is a German surname meaning somebody who castrates animals The Jewish surname Lichter means "lights".

== Notable people ==
- Horst Lichter (born 1962), German chef, television moderator and writer
- Ivan Lichter (1912–2009), New Zealand surgeon
- Marika Lichter (born 1949), Austrian actress
- Samuel Robert Lichter, American political scientist

== Film ==
- Distant Lights (2003 film) (Lichter), a 2003 German film
