= Gerbert =

Gerbert is a Germanic given name, from gar "spear" and berht "bright".

People with Gerbert as given name:

- Gerbert of Aurillac, who became Pope Silvester II
- Gerbert de Montreuil, French poet of the thirteenth century
- Gerbert Moritsevich Rappaport, (1908–1983), a Soviet filmmaker

Notable people with the surname Gerbert:

- Martin Gerbert, German musicologist

In popular culture:

- Gerbert (TV series), a Christian children's TV series

== See also ==
- Gerber (disambiguation)
