= Wulp Castle =

Wulp
- Küsnacht
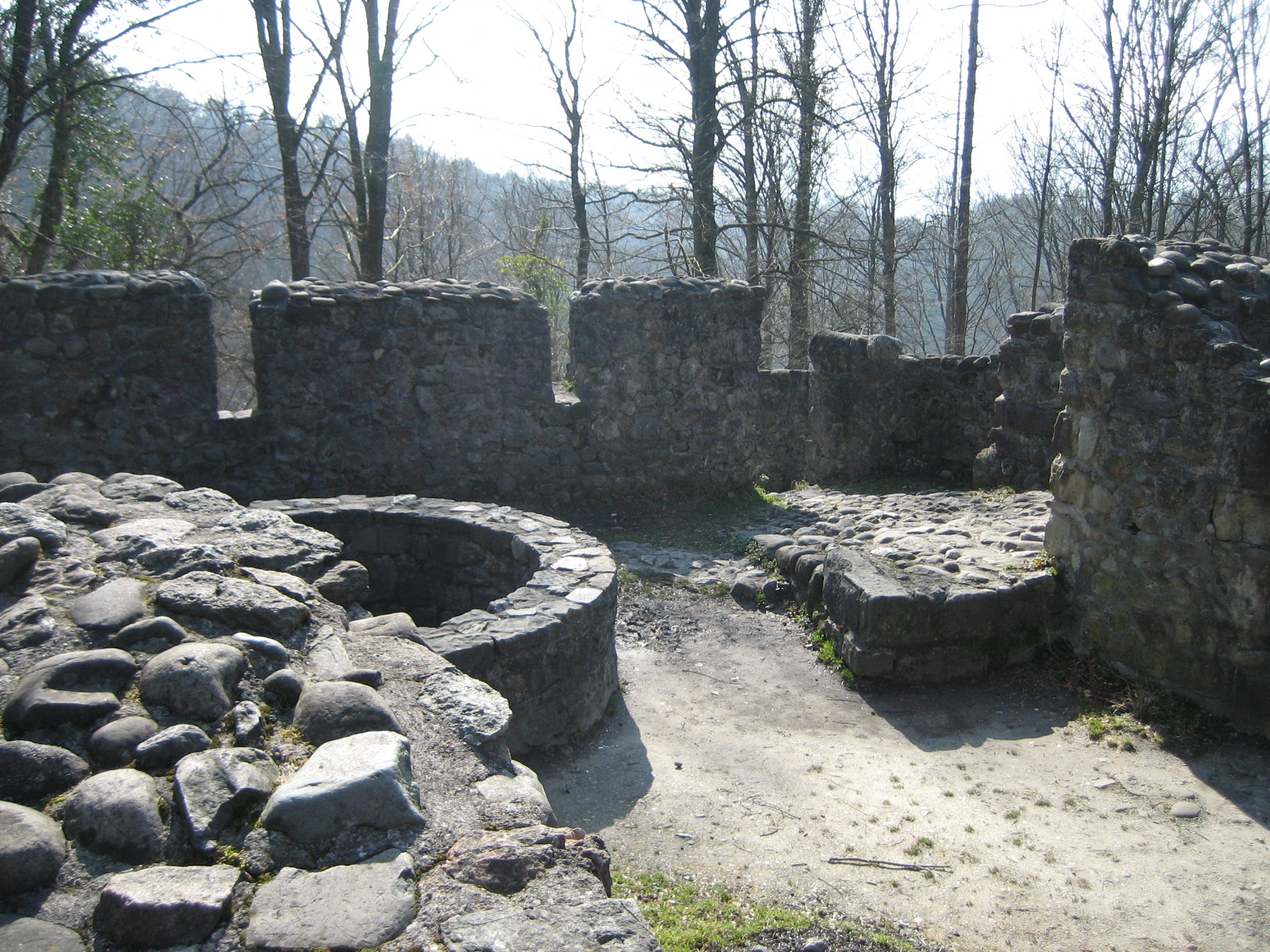
- Ruins of Wulp Castle

Site information
- Type: hill castle
- Code: CH-ZH
- Condition: ruin

Location
- Coordinates: 47°19′17.7″N 8°36′21.1″E
- Height: 570 m above the sea

The ruins of Wulp Castle (German: Ruine Wulp or Burg Wulp) is a castle located besides Küsnachter Tobel in the municipality of Küsnacht and the canton of Zurich in Switzerland. It was built during the high Middle Ages. Despite this, the castle is documented only in a few found texts, and much of the castle's history is not known. However, in the chronicle of Muri Abbey, a castle that could perhaps fit Ruine Wulp's description - a castle in proximity to Zurich and Lake Zurich - was mentioned, but this has not been confirmed by other findings and is mere speculation. Also, a person named Eghart of Küsnacht was mentioned in the chronicle and several other documents to be the owner of the castle in the late 11th century.

== History ==
While no cemented and sure truth about the castle can be confirmed, progress has been made, including the finding of Bronze Age remnants after the excavation of the castle site, such as palisades.

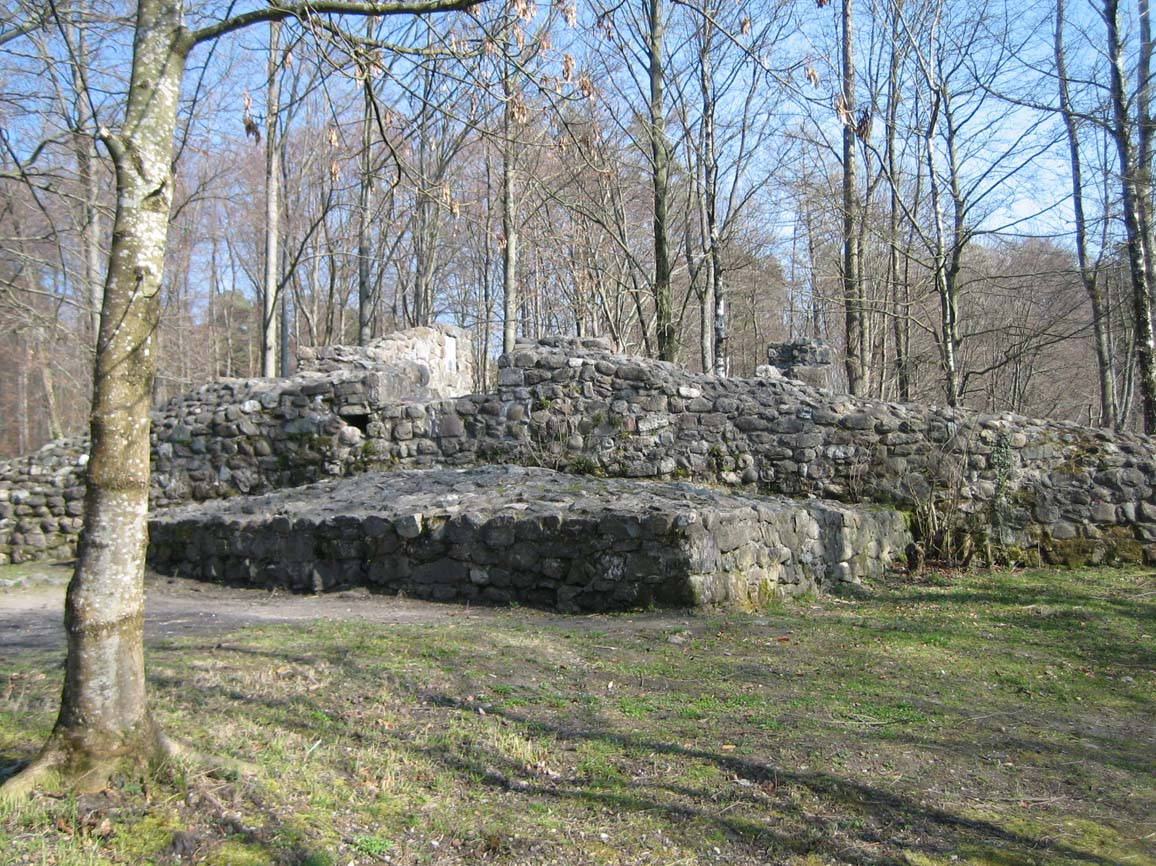
Another photograph of the ruined castle of Ruine Wulp

Other items have been uncovered about the castle's past, such as the altering of the castle in the 13th century, when it is presumed that most or all of the castle was replaced with a single tower and a central building, with only sections of the main wall still existing. After an unknown period of time, the Barons von Regensberg are known to have assumed ownership of Ruine Wulp, and also are known to have made plans to completely renovate the castle, but the plans probably were never realised.

=== Excavation ===
The castle and the castle site were excavated and conserved in 1920 - 1923, 1961–1962, 1978 and 1980 - 1982. The task was performed by the adornment association Küsnacht, and in 1923, the area and castle were placed under the protection and responsibility of the federation.

== Downfall of the castle ==
Several theories exist about how the castle may have come to an end, and historians are in debate. Some theories include:

- The Barons von Regensberg destroyed the castle for an unspecified or unknown reason, or they demolished it with the intent of building a new castle that was never finished.
- The castle was destroyed in 1267 by the inhabitants of Zurich. This theory is confirmed by several old documents, but by no other found evidence.
- The castle was abandoned sometime in the late 13th century, and deteriorated over time.

== Currently ==
Little remains of the castle, and only small and insignificant ruins of the tower foundation and main wall can be defined clearly. However, the ruins have been adequately preserved since the first excavations.
