= Naomi Lynn Gerber =

American internist and physician-scientist

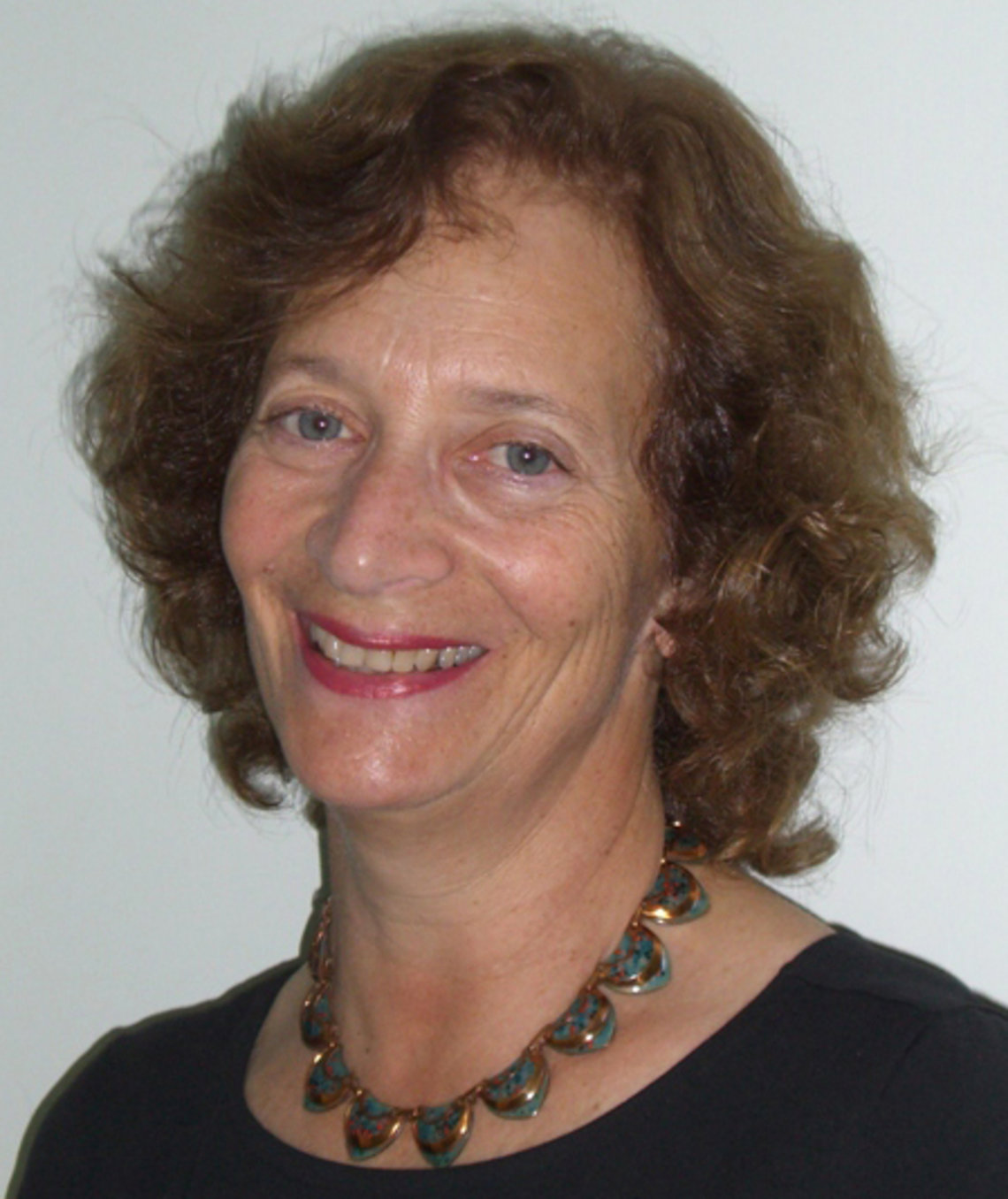
- Gerber in 2008
- Education: Tufts University School of Medicine
- Scientific career
- Fields: Internal medicine, rheumatology, physical medicine & rehabilitation
- Workplaces: National Institutes of Health Clinical Center; George Mason University; Inova Health System

Naomi Lynn Gerber is an American internist, rheumatologist, physiatrist and physician-scientist who researches chronic illness, human movement, myofascial and musculoskeletal pain and the treatment of fatigue. She is a professor emerita in the Department of Health Administration and Policy at George Mason University and is former director of research in the Medicine Service Line Inova Health System.

== Life ==
Gerber completed her M.D. at the Tufts University School of Medicine. From 1975 to 2005, she was chief of the rehabilitation medicine department at the National Institutes of Health Clinical Center. She researches the "causes of functional loss and disability in chronic illness. Specifically, she studies human movement and the mechanisms and treatment of pain and fatigue."

In 2008, Gerber was elected as a member of the National Academy of Medicine. As of 2018, she is a professor in the Department of Health Administration and Policy at George Mason University, director of research in the Department of Medicine at Fairfax Hospital Inova Health System, and chair of the rheumatology section for the Inova Health System. She also serves as primary investigator at the George Mason University Center for the Study of Chronic Illness and Disability. In 2018, she received the Frank H. Krusen, M.D., Lifetime Achievement Award from the American Academy of Physical Medicine and Rehabilitation.
