= Marlies Gerber =

American mathematician

Marlies Gerber is an American mathematician whose research applies descriptive set theory to dynamical systems. She is a professor of mathematics at Indiana University Bloomington.

== Education and career ==
Gerber was the 1971 salutatorian of Zephyrhills High School in Florida. As an undergraduate at the University of Illinois Urbana-Champaign, Gerber competed with Bruce Hajek and Daniel Sleator in the 1974 Putnam Competition, winning an honorable mention for their team. At the University of Illinois, Gerber was the 1974 recipient of the H. Roy Brahana Prize for the "student with the most exceptional undergraduate mathematics career".

Gerber completed her Ph.D. in 1979 at the University of California, Berkeley. Her dissertation, Topics in Ergodic Theory, was supervised by Jacob Feldman. She became a postdoctoral scholar at the University of Maryland and then a faculty member at Indiana University Bloomington. In 1982, when she joined Indiana University, the mathematics department had only one other woman on its faculty, and there were many years when she was the department's only tenured or tenure-track woman.

== Recognition ==
Gerber was an invited speaker at the 2026 International Congress of Mathematicians, on her work with Philipp Kunde proving that isomorphism of smooth ergodic flows forms a binary relation that cannot be described as a Borel set. This work resolves negatively a problem of classifying these flows posed in 1932 by John von Neumann.
