= Leah Gerber =

Professor of Conservation Science

Leah R. Gerber
- Education: Mills College (B.A.); University of Washington (M.M.A., Ph.D.)
- Known for: Biodiversity; Conservation Science
- Scientific career
- Workplaces: National Center for Ecological Analysis and Synthesis; Arizona State University

Leah R. Gerber is a conservation biologist and environmental scientist most known for her contributions to the field of biodiversity conservation. She has conducted research on population ecology, conservation decision-making, and the application of innovative quantitative methods in conservation biology.

Gerber is a Professor of Conservation Science and Founding Director of the Center for Biodiversity Outcomes (CBO) at Arizona State University. She is also a Fellow in the Institute for the Future of Innovation in Society, an Honors faculty in the Barrett Honors College, an Affiliate Faculty in Applied Mathematics for Social Sciences and an Affiliate Faculty in the School of Public Affairs within the same institution.

Gerber looks to inform policy and sustain biodiversity through her research in conservation ecology, and environmental leadership and communication. She has provided insights on global change and biodiversity, interviewing with The Economist, The New York Times, Time, Reuters, Science, National Geographic, The Washington Post, and ABC News, and has also contributed to general audience platforms such as The Conversation, and Pacific Standard.

Gerber is a Fellow of the American Association for the Advancement of Science, the Ecological Society of America, an Aldo Leopold Leadership Fellow, and a Lead Author of the UN Global Assessment of Biodiversity and Ecosystem Services. Since 2016, she has been a Member of the Red List Committee for the International Union for the Conservation of Nature and participated in the Natural Capital Coalition Biodiversity Project Steering Group from 2016 to 2019. In 2018, she joined the Scientific Advisory Board for the Charles Darwin Foundation for the Galápagos Islands, and since 2019, she has also serves as a Member of the Scientific Advisory Board for Defenders of Wildlife.

== Early life and education ==
Gerber earned her bachelor's degree in Environmental Biology from Mills College and went on to obtain an MMA in marine policy and Ph.D. in Wildlife Ecology from University of Washington, where she focused on the dynamics of endangered species populations and exploring the challenges of conserving biodiversity in a changing world. With support from the National Oceanic and Atmospheric Administration, her PhD work focused on the development of quantitative criteria for decision-making under the Endangered Species Act.

Gerber joined the National Center for Ecological Analysis and Synthesis as a postdoctoral researcher in 1999, where she looked at recovery of endangered species and design of marine reserves.

== Career and research ==
=== Research and scientific works ===
After completing her Ph.D., Gerber pursued a career in academia and conservation science. Her research has encompassed topics from assessing population viability and species recovery to incorporating economic considerations into conservation planning. Her research has produced insights into the effective allocation of limited resources for conservation efforts; the evaluation of conservation interventions, and the identification of priority areas for biodiversity conservation.

Gerber has published over 150 peer-reviewed publications.

Gerber was recognized as a Tenure Exemplar Professor at Arizona State University in 2006. She is an Affiliated Scholar of Arizona State University's Consortium for Science, Policy and Outcomes and serves on the Arizona State University President's Council on Women in Leadership. She became a Full Professor in 2013 and established the Arizona State University CBO in 2014. The Center works with researchers from across the university, looking to encourage discoveries that conserve and sustain biodiversity and link those innovations to decision-making. She has also established new approaches for academic and public engagement and is a National Science Foundation Science of Science and Innovation Policy program grant holder.

One of Gerber's notable contributions to the field of conservation biology is her development of quantitative methods for decision-making in conservation. Gerber has developed approaches to conservation and management such as conservation priority setting, ecosystem-based management, adaptive monitoring and management, endangered species recovery plans, and estimating extinction risk. She combines theories of behavioral ecology with quantitative approaches of demography to examine how reproductive behavior impacts the extinction risks for marine mammals. In this work, she has focused her research on the importance of biological uncertainty in environmental decision-making.

=== Science and policy ===
Gerber has worked to bridge the gap between science and policy-making processes. She has served as an advisor and consultant for governmental and non-governmental organizations, providing guidance on conservation strategies, biodiversity management, and environmental policy.

Gerber has been an advocate for evidence-based decision-making and has collaborated with policymakers to develop science-informed policies and regulations. Her efforts have contributed to the development of sustainable conservation practices and the protection of vulnerable species and ecosystems. In 2021 she provided expert testimony for U.S. Senate Committee on Environment and Public Works in a hearing, “Examining Biodiversity Loss: Drivers, Impacts, and Potential Solutions.”

In collaboration with The Nature Conservancy, she produced a handbook designed to teach field biologists how to make use of population and demographic analysis. She has also analyzed the health and sustainability of seafood, and organized a series of events to educate the general public in how to make more sustainable choices. In 2019, she was recognized as a pioneer in recovering the endangered white abalone by establishing a restoration program.

Gerber served on the Intergovernmental Science-Policy Platform on Biodiversity and Ecosystem Services and coauthored the global assessment of biodiversity, evaluating the world's status in relation to the Sustainable Development Goals, Aichi Biodiversity Targets and Paris Agreement. In recent years, she has expressed concerns regarding the impact of the first Trump Administration on the United States Environmental Protection Agency as well.

In 2017 Gerber moved to Ecuador as a Fulbright Program scholar in the Universidad San Francisco de Quito. Here she looked to understand how local people promote and protect biodiversity. She focused on incentives to protect wildlife in the Galápagos Islands and was awarded a grant from the Lenfest Ocean Program in 2019 to work with the Galápagos National Park to effectively manage the Galápagos Marine Reserve.

While governmental funding is available to protect biodiversity, it is insufficient and not distributed evenly amongst different species; Gerber showed that more than a quarter of investment into protecting species goes to only 139 plants and animals in the US. She has worked with the United States Fish and Wildlife Service to create a tool to compare funding allocations and the consequences of resource allocation strategies. The Recovery Prioritization Explorer was created as part of a SESYNC Endangered Species Act Decision Support Venture.

=== Teaching and mentoring ===
In addition to her research and policy work, Gerber has served as a Professor and Supervisor at ASU since 2001.

== Awards and honors ==
- 2004 – NSF Early Career Investigator Award
- 2006 – ASU President's Medal for Social Embeddedness, Environmental Education
- 2007 – Promotion and Tenure Faculty Exemplar, Arizona State University
- 2008 – Rising Star in Ecology, Ecological Society of America
- 2009 – Women hold up half the sky, Mills College
- 2010 – Distinguished Visiting Associate Professor, UC Santa Barbara
- 2011 – Aldo Leopold Leadership Fellow, Stanford University
- 2015 – Inspirational Faculty Award, ASU office of Student-Athlete Development
- 2017 – Fellow, Ecological Society of America
- 2017 – Fulbright Scholar, Ecuador, J. William Fulbright Foreign Scholarship Board
- 2017 – Top 200 for 100 & Change Award, John D. and Catherine T. MacArthur Foundation
- 2020 – Fellow, American Association for the Advancement of Science
- 2022 – Spirit of Defenders Award for Science, Defenders of Wildlife

== Personal life ==
Gerber is an advocate for environmental education and actively engages in outreach activities.

Gerber has two daughters. In her article for Animal Político, she shared a meaningful encounter with nature while studying sea lions in the Gulf of California. A friendly dolphin's persistent attention led to the realization of her pregnancy, which was playfully suggested by a Mexican fisherman. This incident sparked her reflection on the connection between the dolphin and the fisherman. She emphasized the connection to biodiversity and the importance of conservation for ecosystem services, species protection, and human well-being.

== Selected articles ==
- Gerber, L. R., Botsford, L. W., Hastings, A., Possingham, H. P., Gaines, S. D., Palumbi, S. R., & Andelman, S. (2003). Population models for marine reserve design: a retrospective and prospective synthesis. Ecological applications, 13(sp1), 47–64.
- Gerber, L. R., Beger, M., McCarthy, M. A., & Possingham, H. P. (2005). A theory for optimal monitoring of marine reserves. Ecology Letters, 8(8), 829–837.
- Gerber, L. R., Hyrenbach, K. D., & Zacharias, M. A. (2005). Do the largest protected areas conserve whales or whalers?. Science, 307(5709), 525–526.
- Gerber, L. R. (2006). Including behavioral data in demographic models improves estimates of population viability. Frontiers in Ecology and the Environment, 4(8), 419–427.
- Gerber, L. R., Morissette, L., Kaschner, K., & Pauly, D. (2009). Should whales be culled to increase fishery yield?. Science, 323(5916), 880–881.
- Gerber, L. R., Costello, C., & Gaines, S. D. (2014). Conservation markets for wildlife management with case studies from whaling" Ecological Applications, 24(1), 4–14.
- Gerber, L. R. (2016). Conservation triage or injurious neglect in endangered species recovery. Proceedings of the National Academy of Sciences, 113(13), 3563–3566.
- Puritty, C., Strickland, L. R., Alia, E., Blonder, B., Klein, E., Kohl, M. T., ... & Gerber, L. R. (2017). Without inclusion, diversity initiatives may not be enough. Science, 357(6356), 1101–1102.
- Gerber, L. R., Runge, M. C., Maloney, R. F., Iacona, G. D., Drew, C. A., Avery-Gomm, S., ... & Zablan, M. A. (2018). Endangered species recovery: A resource allocation problem. Science, 362(6412), 284–286.
- Gerber, L. R., Barton, C. J., Cheng, S. H., & Anderson, D. (2020). Producing actionable science in conservation: Best practices for organizations and individuals. Conservation Science and Practice, 2(12), e295.
