= Regensberg family =

Family of counts from the canton of Zürich in Switzerland

Regensberg
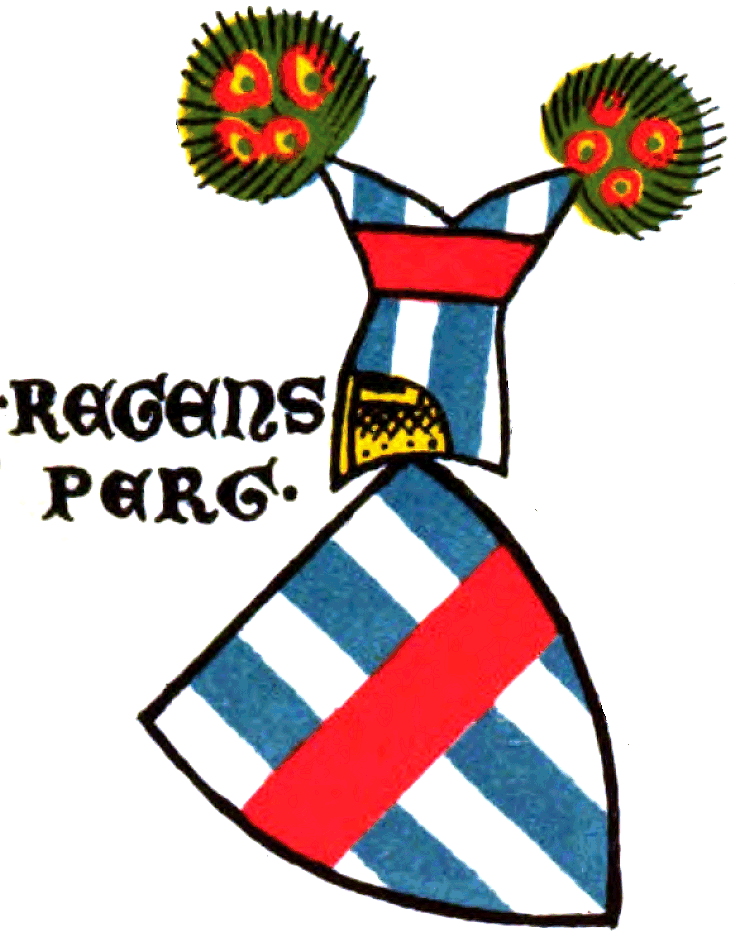
- Country: Holy Roman Empire
- Founded: 1044
- Founder: Lütold I von Regensberg
- Final ruler: Lütold IX von Regensberg
- Estate: Zürich
- Dissolution: 1331

The Regensberg family was a family of counts from the Canton of Zürich in Switzerland. They had possessions in the medieval Zürichgau from the probably mid-11th century and became extinct in 1331 AD. With the extinction of the male line, the city republic of Zürich laid claim to the Regensberg lands and formed the Herrschaft Regensberg respectively Äussere Vogtei.

== Lordship Regensberg ==
The heartland of the Regensberg possessions was in the Furt, Surb and Wehn valleys besides the Lägern chain. Other assets and rights were in the Limmat and Reppisch valleys, in Zürcher Oberland, in the Pfannenstiel region, also sporadically in the present Thurgau and north of the Rhein river and on Bodensee lake shore. The house's significant position founded on marriage relations with the noble houses of Kyburg, Rapperswil-Habsburg-Laufenburg, Neuchâtel and Pfirt.

== History ==
=== Early history ===
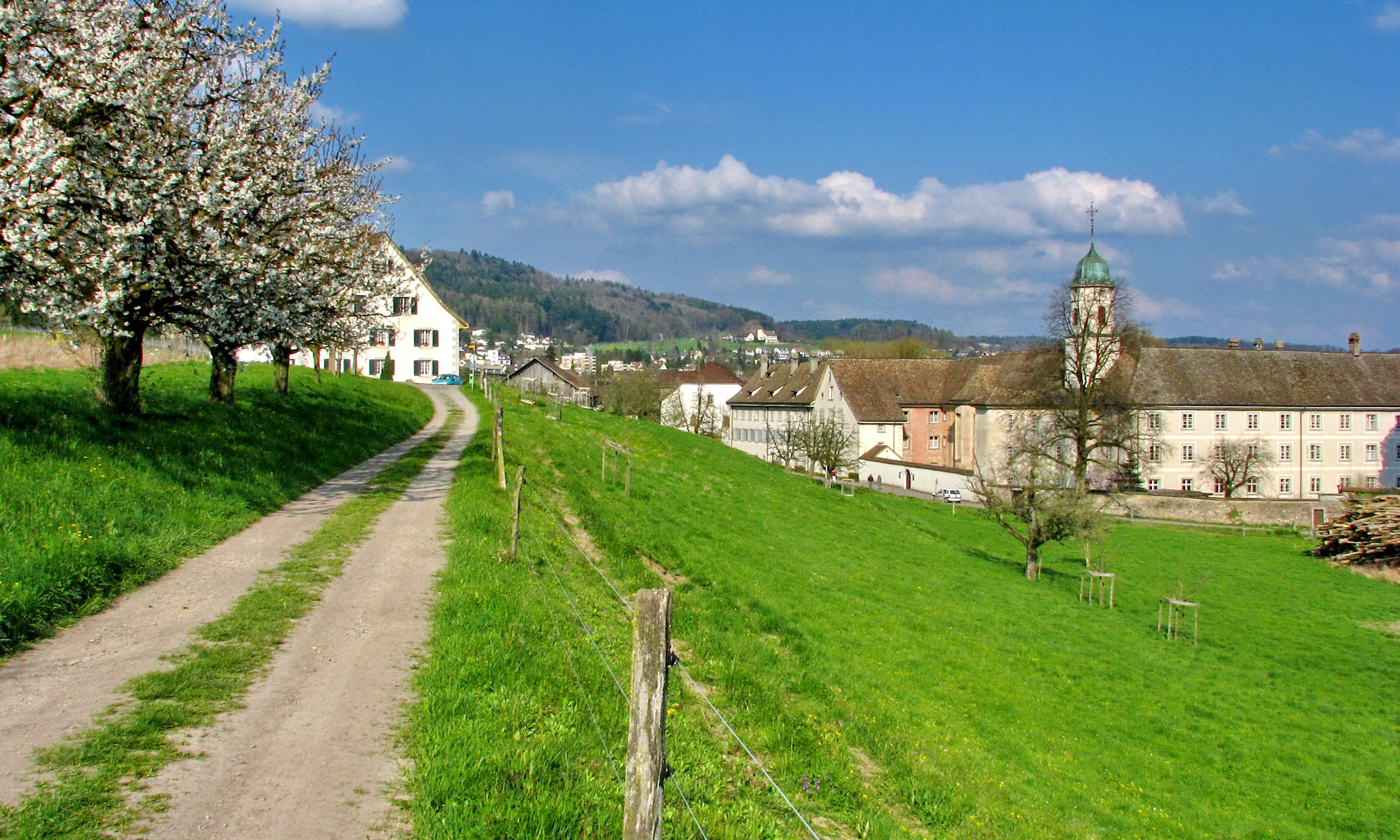
Fahr Abbey in the Limmat Valley

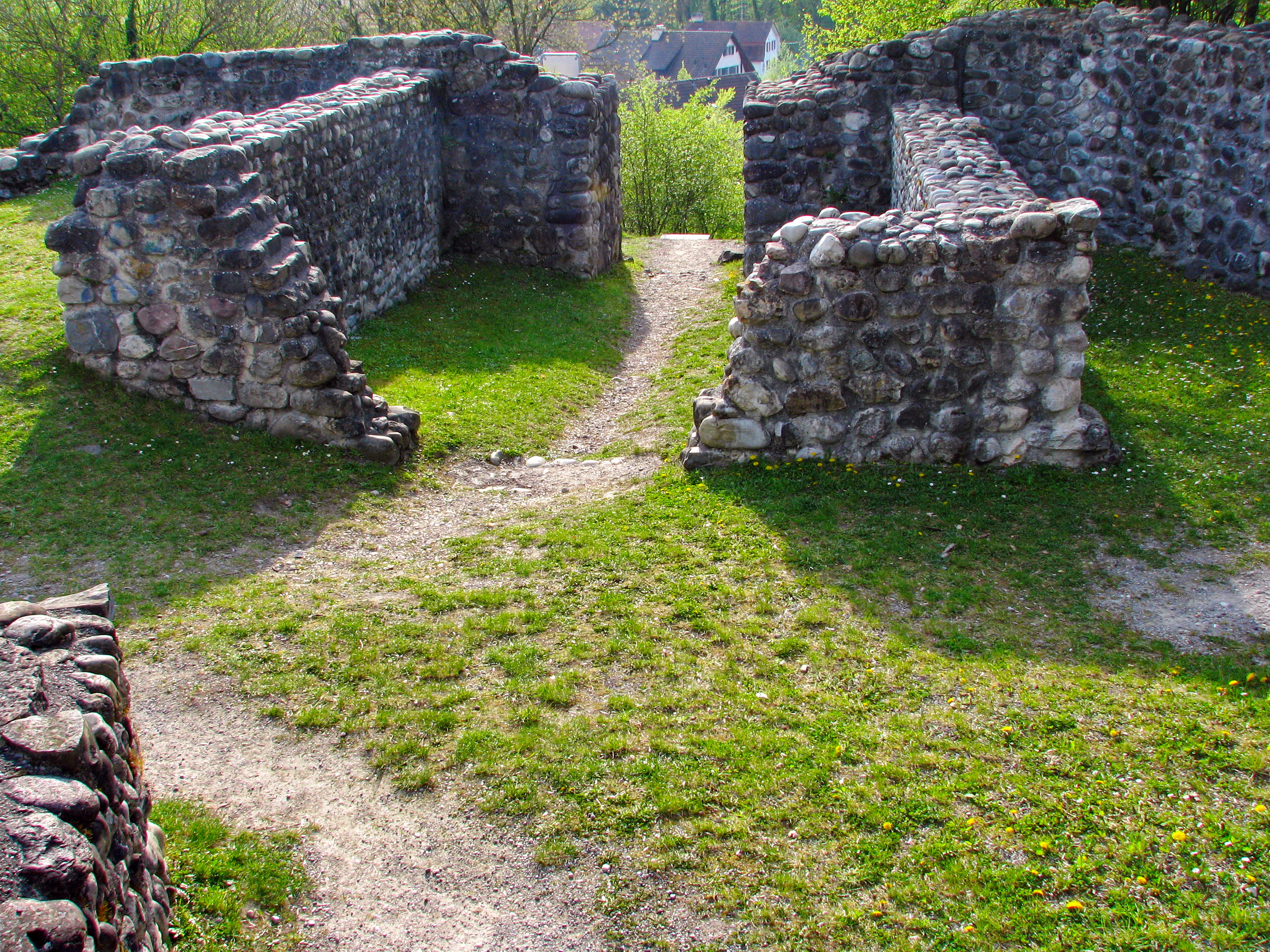
Ruins of Alt-Regensberg

The origins of the family are unclear, and various speculations by also renowned historians have not been proven so far. The so-called Hunfried document of 1044 AD mentions among others a witness named Lütold of Affoltern who is suspected as the builder of the ancestral seat around 1050, the Alt-Regensberg Castle on the border between Regensdorf and Zürich-Affoltern. In 1083 Lütold I von Regensberg, Kastvogt of the Muri Abbey, is mentioned as the first bearer of the name and supposedly son of Lütold von Affoltern. Lütold II and his wife Judenta and their son Lütold III donated goods to build a nunnery, the later Fahr Abbey in 1130. Lütold III was associated in the 1180s with the House of Zähringen.

=== Expansion of the Regensberg lands ===
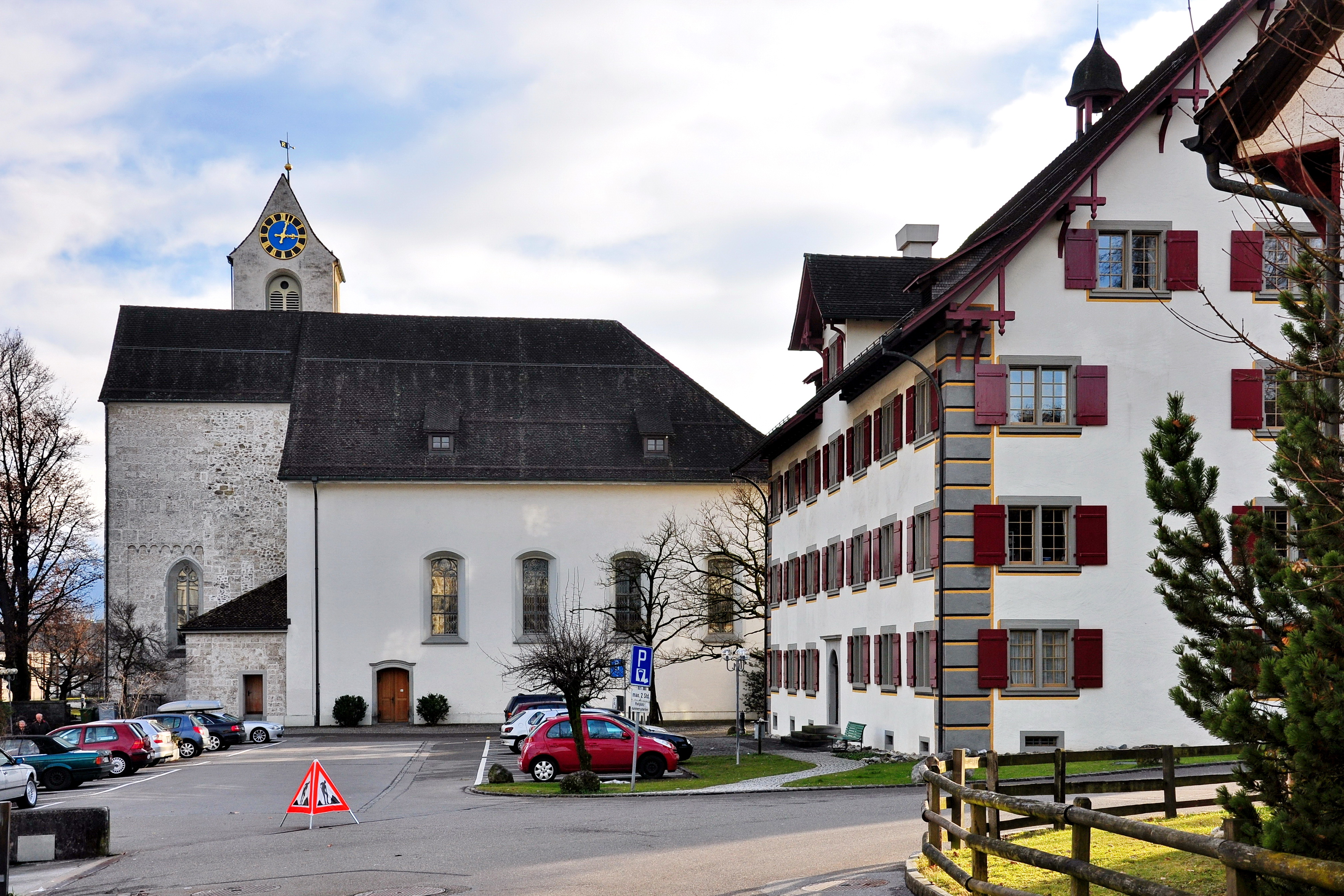
Rüti Reformed Church, the church of the former Rüti Abbey

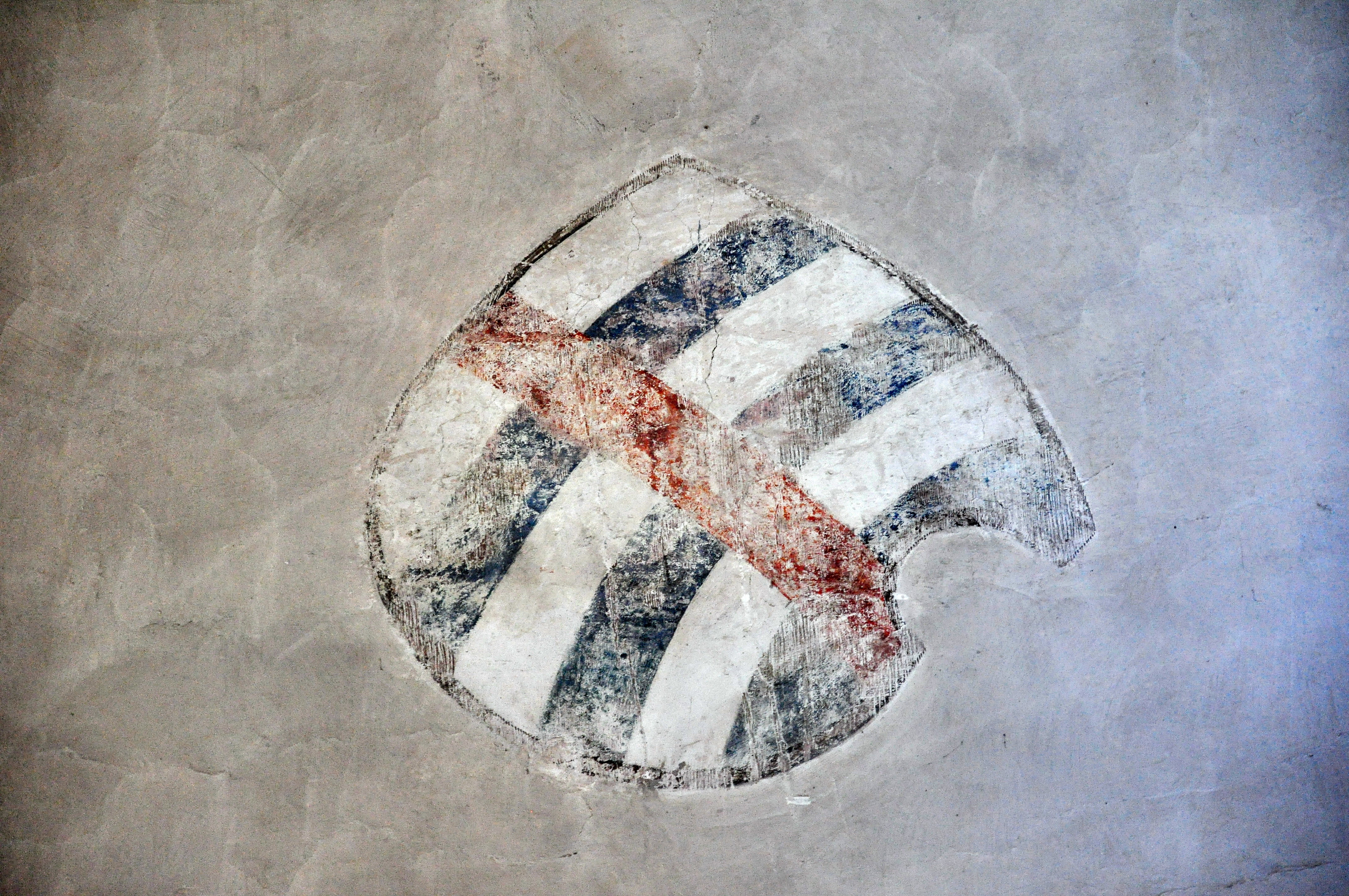
Coats of arms in the Rüti Church; those of the present municipality of Rüti goes back to the coats of arms of the Regensberg family.

The foundation of the Rüti Abbey probably enabled Lütold IV to secure goods from the legacy of Alt-Rapperswil around 1192 to escape the clutches between Toggenburg and Neu-Rapperswil. In association with Rudolf II von Rapperswil a private church in Seegräben went over to the Rüti Abbey in 1206. A visible sign of the upturn of the Regensberg family was the decisive transformation of the ancestral seat as high medieval aristocratic residence with walls made of stone instead of a palisade and the elaborate shell of the keep. Shortly after the founding of the town of Grüningen which probably served as security for controversial goods in the Zürich Oberland, in 1219, on the mediation of the Archbishop Eberhard of Salzburg, a brother of Lütold V, the Kastvogtei on Rüti went to Neu-Rapperswil. Lütold VI was looking for a better penetration of his reign, and for this purpose he established from the 1240s its own service nobility (von Lägern, von Mandach, von Steinmaur and von Tal families). Around the middle of the century, he also founded the castle and town of Neu-Regensberg and the small market town Glanzenberg near the Fahr Abbey in the Limmat Valley.

Either Lütold V von Regensberg or his son Ulrich (+ 1280) has established the fortified town of Neu-Regensberg, but when Lütold V died about 1250, his two sons Lütold VI and Ulrich divided the inheritance: Lütold VI retained the ancestral castle and the extensive free float, his brother Ulrich received Neu-Regensberg and the possessions in the Limmattal, and so the lines Alt-Regensberg and Neu-Regensberg were established. But, finally, both lines failed to establish a bailiwick in opposition to namely the Habsburg family, and the expanding city of Zürich that tried to establish long-distance trading routes.

=== Regensberger Fehde and decline ===
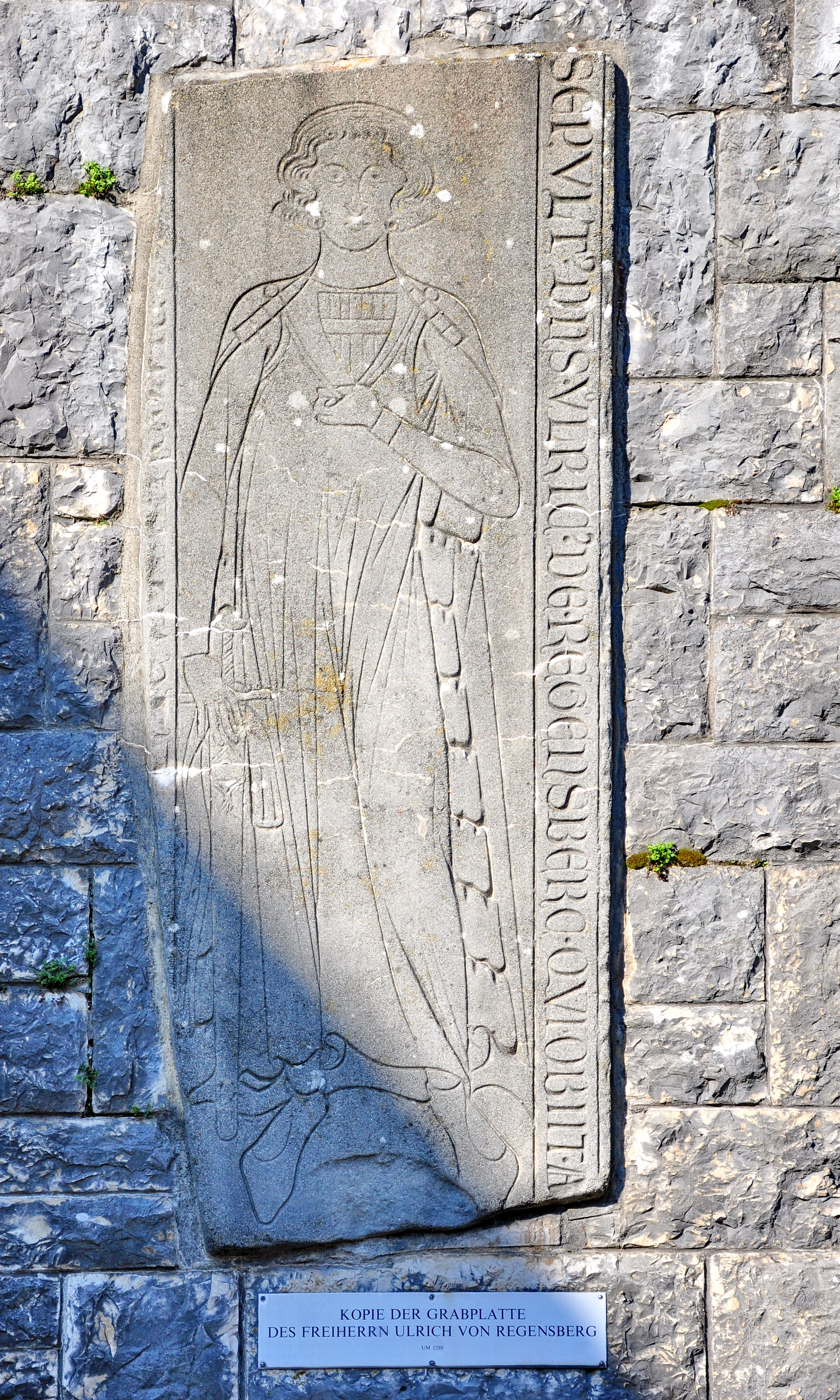
replic of the gravestone of Ulrich I von Regensberg at the Regensberg Castle

During the mid-13th century, the relations between the House of Regensberg and the city of Zürich became strained, and Ulrich came in conflict with the House of Habsburg inheriting the lands of extinct House of Kyburg. In 1267/68 the disputes about the Kyburg lands led to a war respectively feud (so-called Regensberger Fehde) between the Regensberg family and an alliance of the city of Zürich and Rudolf von Habsburg who later became king; latter should have destroyed respectively conquered with adventurous tricks the surrounding Regensberg castles, among them Glanzenberg, Wulp Castle above the Küsnachter Tobel, Uetliburg, Friesenburg and Baldern castles on the Albis chain, and even the Uznaberg castle of the House of Toggenburg. Ulrich lost the war, and the House of Regensberg rapidly declined in power over the following decades: Grüningen was sold in 1269, the town of Kaiserstuhl was sold by a son of Lütold IX to the Bishop of Constance in 1294, Neu-Regensberg went over to Habsburg in 1302, and even the family crest was sold in 1317.

Around 1290 Lütold VII already had left his home castle, but maybe up to his death in 1320 he settled again on Alt-Regensberg. The last representative of Neu-Regensberg also returned to the ancestral castle, after they had sold in 1302 the castle and town of Neu-Regensberg. In 1324 Lütold IX sealed the last document at Altburg castle and died in 1331 as the last of Neu-Regensberg; Alt-Regensberg already extinct in 1302.

Recent research assumes that their rule functions later were acquired by the lords of Baldegg and later by the family of Landenberg-Greifensee (both Habsburg ministerials), since the latter is documented as the owner of Altburg from 1354.

== Äussere Vogtei of the city republic of Zürich ==
The Habsburgs mortgaged Neu-Regensberg several times, and in 1407 the so-called Herrschaft Regensberg was acquired by the city of Zürich. On 2 September 1407 Uolrich von Landenberg von Griffense der Älteste and his son Walther confirmed the conditions to sell the Altburg castle, rights and lands to the city of Zürich. From 1417 Neu-Regensberg became the seat of the bailiff of the Herrschaft Regensberg, later named Äussere Vogtei of the city of Zürich.

== Monastic foundations ==
Two important monastic foundations date back to the House of Regensberg: Around 1130 Lütold II and his wife Judenta and his son Lütold III founded the Fahr Abbey, a Benedictine nunnery that still exists, and with the foundation of Rüti Abbey in 1206 the family probably secured lands of the first extinction of the Alt-Rapperswil family around 1192; the Premonstratensian abbey was abolished during the Reformation in Zürich in 1525.

== Literature ==
- Roger Sablonier: Adel im Wandel. Untersuchungen zur sozialen Situation des ostschweizerischen Adels um 1300. Chronos-Verlag, Zürich 1979/2000. ISBN 978-3-905313-55-0.
