= Gerber, Georgia =

Coordinates: 34°56′10″N 85°22′05″W

Gerber is a ghost town in Walker County, in the U.S. state of Georgia.

== History ==
A post office called Gerber was established in 1880, and remained in operation until it was discontinued in 1895. G. Fred Gerber, the first postmaster, gave the community its name.
