= Tage von Gerber =

Tage Erland von Gerber (born 8 February 1885 in Sölvesborg, died 9 June 1966) was a Swedish landowner, captain and genealogist. He was the founder of Ointroducerad Adels Förening, the Association of the Unintroduced Nobility of Sweden, in 1911, and the editor of Sveriges ointroducerade adels kalender, the second almanach of unintroduced nobility in Sweden to be published, from 1912 to 1944. He was owner of Falla Manor in Östergötland. In 1960, he was named honorary member of Ointroducerad Adels Förening, the second person to be so honoured after Prince Carl Bernadotte.

He was the brother of Carl Wilhelm von Gerber.
