= Carl Wilhelm von Gerber =

Swedish diplomat and businessman

Carl Wilhelm von Gerber (15 May 1883 – 19 August 1959) was a Swedish diplomat and businessman living and working in Egypt.

== Early life ==
Gerber was born on 15 May 1883 in Sölvesborg, Sweden, the son of the merchant Axel Wilhelm von Gerber and his wife Ida (née Nilsson). His brother, Tage von Gerber, was born two years later, on 8 February 1885. Gerber passed studentexamen in Kristianstad on 10 June 1902 and graduated with a degree in trade from the Gothenburg Business Institute in 1903.

== Career ==
After trade practice in Germany until May 1907, von Gerber boarded the SS Andros (Deutsche Levante Linie) and arrived in Alexandria, Egypt, on 27 May. On Christmas Day 1908, he founded his company in Egypt in the timber trade. On 1 February 1925 he laid the foundation for his palace at the Corniche in Alexandria.

Gerber became Swedish vice-consul in Alexandria in 1921 and was consul from 1925 to 1951. He became consul general in 1939. During the Second World War, from 1939 to 1945, he acted as protecting power on behalf of Germany, Hungary, and Finland. He was vice president of the Société Archéologique d'Alexandrie from 1942 to 1959 and delegate to the Swedish Church Sailor Care Board in Alexandria from 1953 to 1959. On 10 January 1959, Gerber officiated the ceremonial inauguration of the Swedish Seamen's Church, or Swedish Seamen's Institute. in Alexandria.

== Death ==
On 19 August 1959, Gerber was found murdered in the bath in his private apartment at the palace. The murder remained unsolved. After his death, thanks to the gift of his brother, his palace eventually housed the Church of Sweden Abroad. Over the years, the house has been used by the Seamen Board and the Church of Sweden Abroad and has served as a meeting place for the Swedish colony in Alexandria. Today it houses the Swedish Institute Alexandria.

== Awards and decorations ==
- King Gustaf V's Jubilee Commemorative Medal (1928)
- Knight of the Order of the Polar Star
- Commander of the Order of Vasa
- Commander of the Order of the Lion of Finland
- Commander of the Order of Merit of the Republic of Hungary
- Knight of the Order of the Dannebrog
- Knight First Class of the Order of the White Rose of Finland
- Fifth Class of the Order of the Nile
