= John Gerber =

John Gerber may refer to:

- John Gerber (bridge) (1906–1981), American contract bridge champion player and captain
- John Paul Gerber (1945–2010), American historian, librarian, writer
- John Gerber, musician with The Flock

== See also ==
- Eugene John Gerber (1931–2018), American bishop
