= Peter Gerber =

Peter Gerber is the name of:

- Peter Gerber (politician) (1923–2012), Swiss politician and President of the Swiss Council of States
- Peter Gerber (boxer) (born 1944), West German boxer; see 1965 and 1967 European Amateur Boxing Championships
- Peter Gerber (sailor) (born 1944), Austrian sailor
- Peter Gerber (ice dancer) (born 1992), Polish ice dancer
- Peter Gerber (business executive), CEO of the German airline Condor
