= Merya =

Merya may refer to:

- Merya people
- Merya language, an extinct language
- Merya (Tanzanian ward)

== See also ==
- Meryan (disambiguation)
- Merja (disambiguation), pronounced "Merya"
- Meria (disambiguation)
- Marya, a tribe of Eritria
