= Merja =

Merja may refer to

- Merja, Estonia, a village in Estonia
- Merja (name), a Finnish female name
- Merja Media, an Australian Visual Artists collective

== See also ==
- Merya (disambiguation)
