= Merian =

Merian may refer to

== People with the surname ==
- Merian family, Swiss patrician family from Basel
- Matthäus Merian the Elder (1593–1650), Swiss-German engraver and publisher
- Matthäus Merian the Younger (1621–1687), Swiss painter
- Maria Sibylla Merian (1647–1717), naturalist and scientific illustrator
- Johann Bernhard Merian (1723–1807), Swiss philosopher
- Christoph Merian (1800–1858), Swiss banker, businessman and rentier
- Merian C. Cooper (1893—1973), American aviator and writer, director of King Kong
- Charles Merian Cooper (1856–1923), American congressman from Florida
- Leon Merian (born Leon Megerdichian) (1923-2007), American jazz trumpeter

== Other ==
- Merian (magazine), a German travel magazine
- Plan de Mérian, a map of Paris, France created in 1615
- Villa Merian, a Villa in Münchenstein, Switzerland
- Christoph Merian Stiftung, a non-profit-making public utility institution in Basel, Switzerland
- 48458 Merian, a minor planet named after Matthäus Merian
- RV Maria S. Merian (launched 2005), a German research vessel

== See also ==
- Meryan (disambiguation)
- Meriam (disambiguation)
- Marian (disambiguation)
- Meridian (disambiguation)
