= Meriam =

Meriam may refer to:

- Someone or something related to Murray Island, Queensland, also called Mer
  - Meriam people, the people of Mer
  - Meriam language, the language of the Meriam people
- A variant of the female given name Miriam
- Lady Meriam, Chong Ah Mei (died 1935), first wife of the first Prime Minister of Malaysia, Tunku Abdul Rahman
- Lantaka, Javanese bronze breech-loaded swivel-guns
- Mary Meriam (born 1955), American poet and editor
- Francis Jackson Meriam, American abolitionist

== See also ==
- Merriam (disambiguation)
- Merian (disambiguation)
