= Regensberg Reformed Church =

Church in Zurich, Switzerland

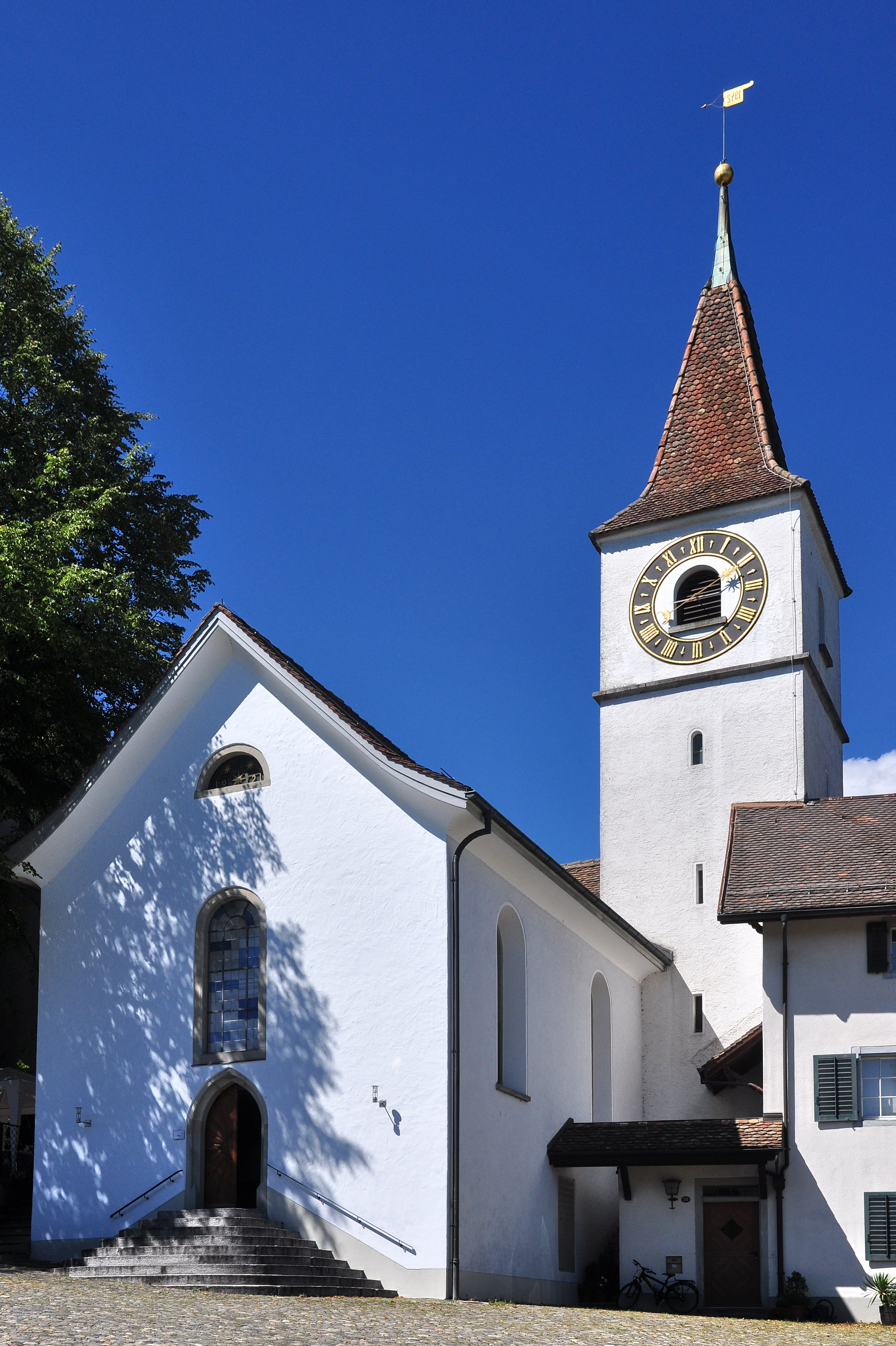
- The church in 2011

Religion
- Affiliation: Evangelical Reformed
- District: Evangelical Reformed Church of the Canton of Zürich

Location
- Location: Regensberg, Canton of Zürich; Switzerland
- Interactive map of Regensberg Reformed Church
- Coordinates: 47.483218°N 8.438782°E

Architecture
- Type: Church
- Style: Gothic
- Completed: 1248 (original chapel); 1540 (stone church); 1723 (tower roof redesigned); 1991 (renovation)

Website
- Official website

Regensberg Reformed Church (Reformierte Kirchgemeinde Regensberg) is an Evangelical Reformed Church in the Swiss municipality of Regensberg in the Canton of Zürich. The church originally dates to 1248, when it was a wooden chapel. In 1540, the chapel and all the houses in the upper castle were destroyed by fire. Only the church's tower, dating to 1506, and the main portal were spared. The church was rebuilt in stone in the Gothic style. Its south-facing clock face overlooks the municipality.

The roof of the church tower was redesigned and rebuilt as a "tent roof" in 1723. To pay for the work, the church's pews were sold.

Three new bells were installed in the new tower clock shortly after World War II, in addition to a new mechanical organ being built.

Another major renovation was begun in 1991.

As of 2024, the pastor of the church is Bänziger Matthias.

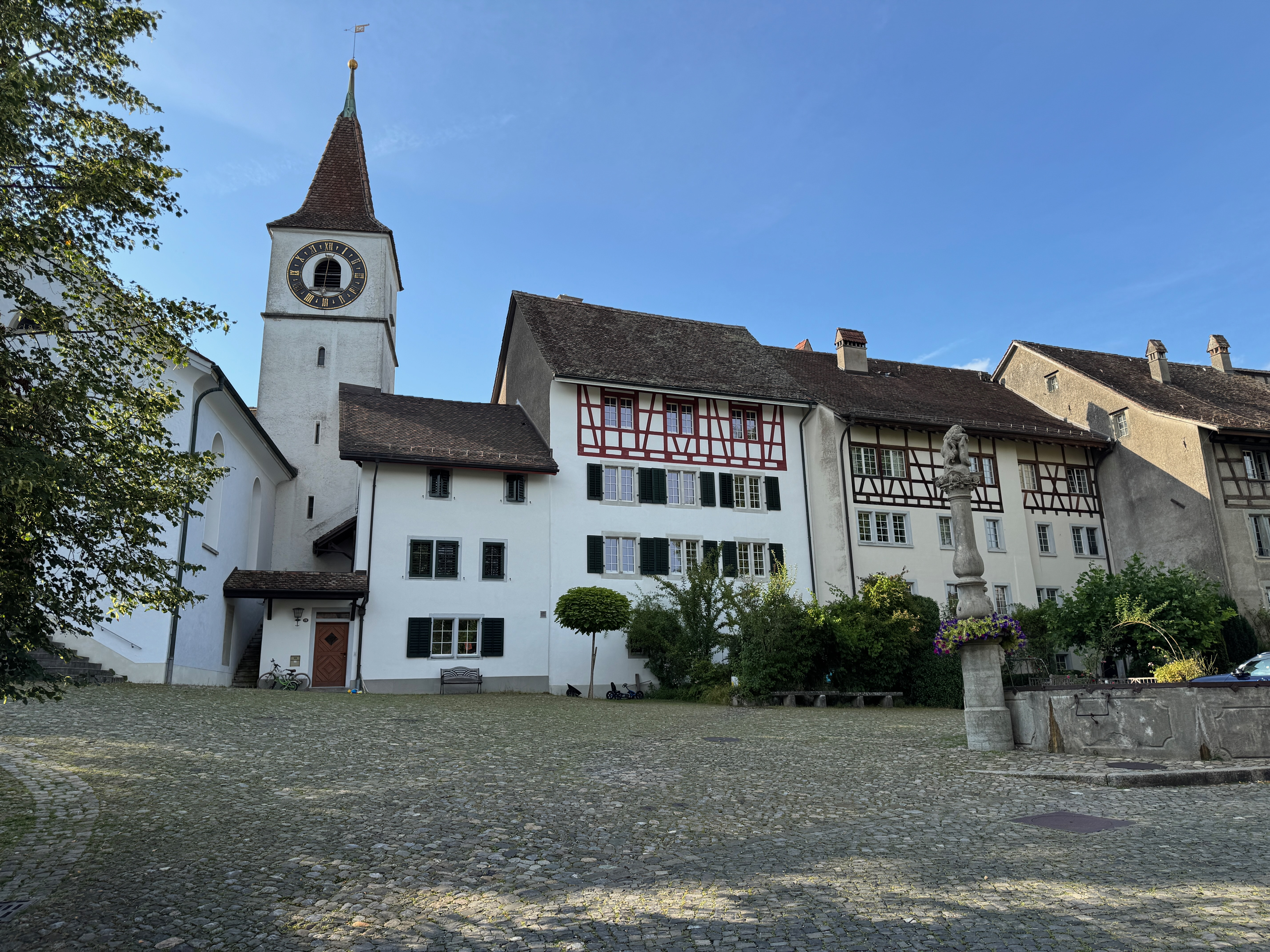
Viewed from the merging of the Unterburg (lower castle) and the Oberburg (upper castle) on the church's southern side

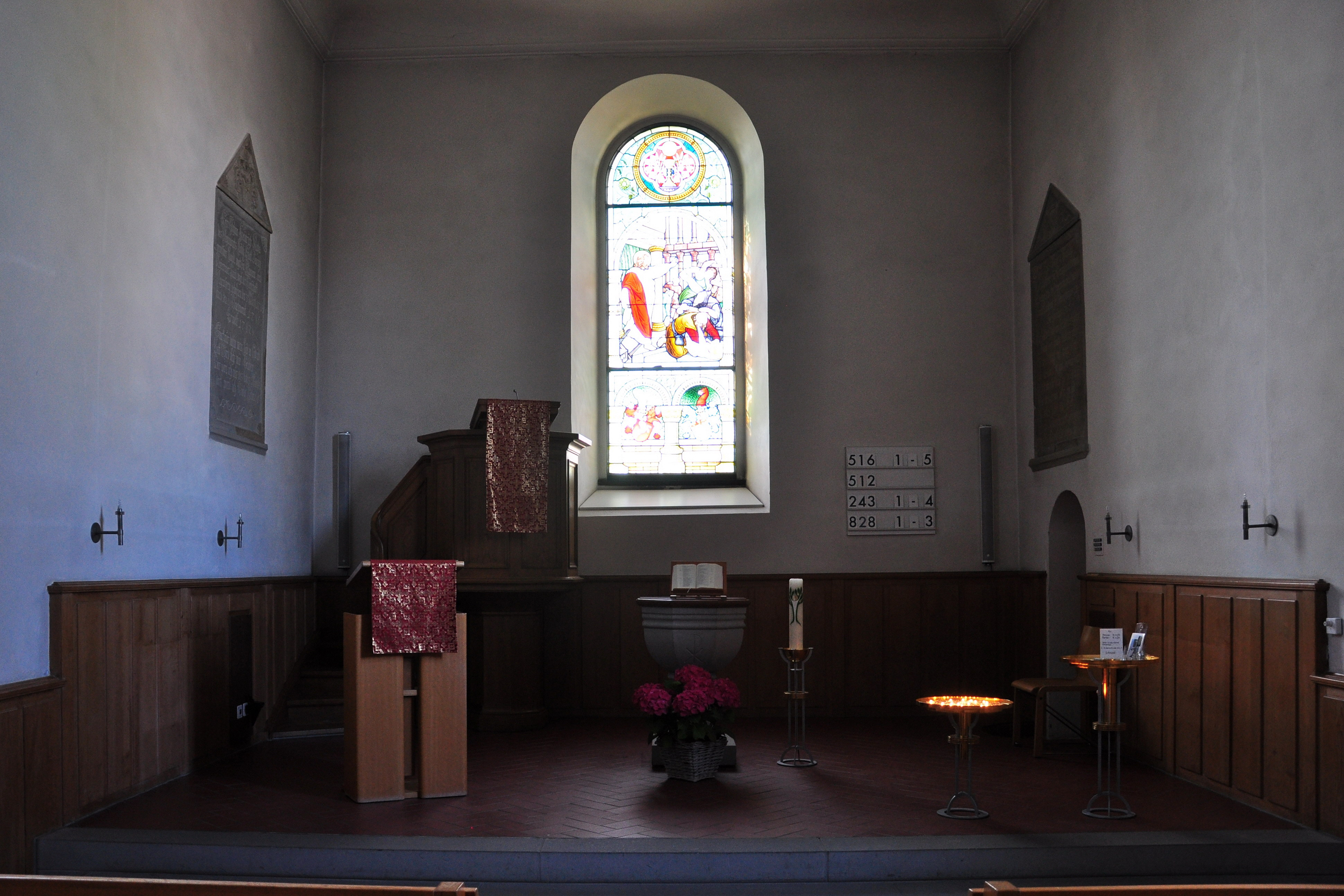
Interior
