= Meria =

Meria may refer to:

== People ==
- Meria Aires (born 1989), Bruneian singer-songwriter
- Meria people, also known as Volga Finns

== Places ==
- Berești-Meria, Romania
- Meria, Hunedoara, Romania
- Meria, Haute-Corse, Corsica, France
- Meria, Ozurgeti Municipality, Georgia

== Other ==
- MERIA, Middle East Review of International Affairs
- Meria Book, another name of the fictional character Shepherd Book in Firefly
- Meria laricis, also known as Rhabdocline laricis, a species of fungi that afflicts larch tree needles
