= Oberburg, Regensberg =

Public square in Regensberg, Switzerland

Oberburg
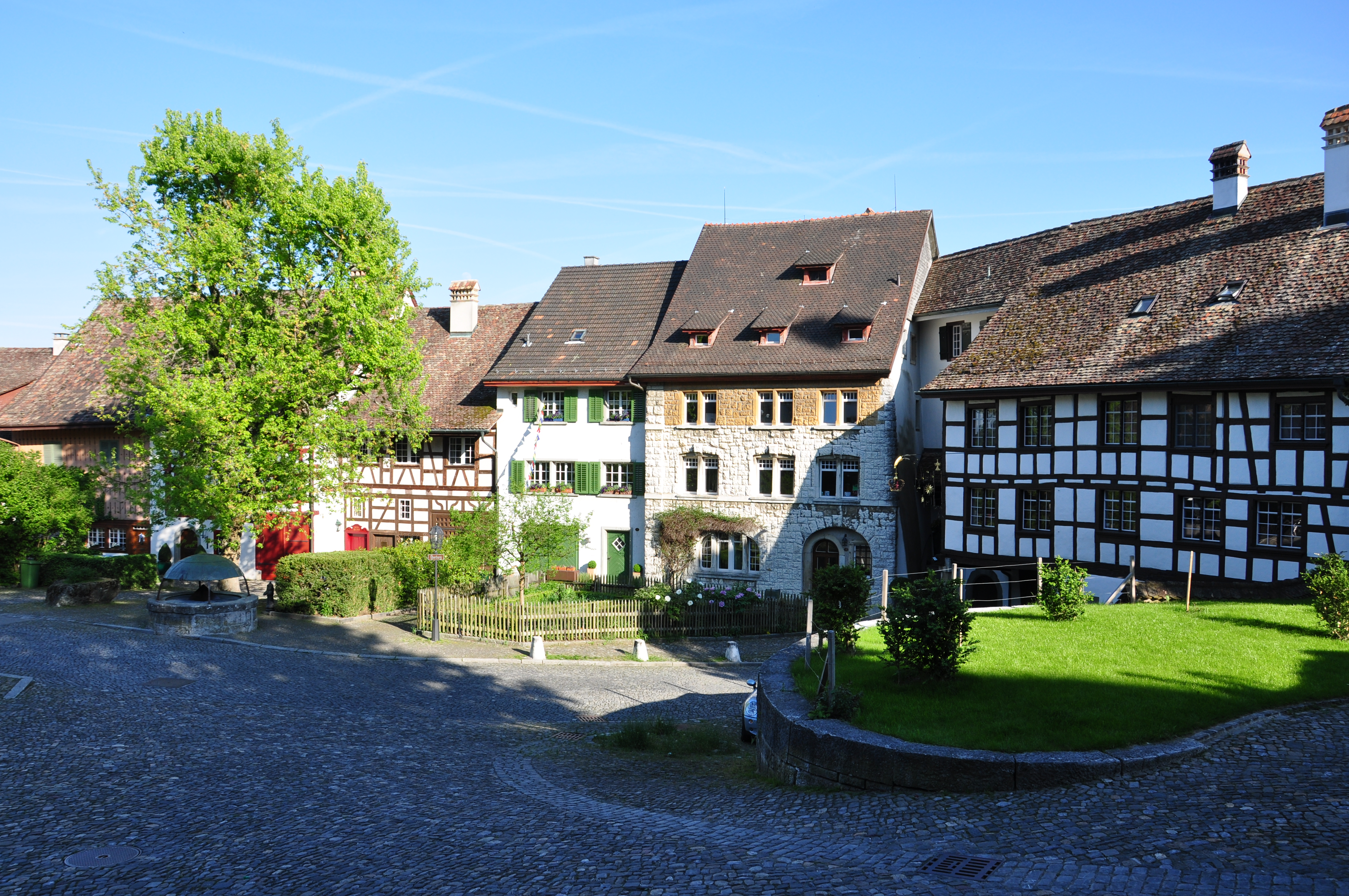
- Oberburg, looking east
- Interactive map of Oberburg
- Location: Regensberg, Switzerland
- Coordinates: 47.4830186°N 8.4389379°E
- South: Unterburg

Construction
- Completed: 13th century

Oberburg (English: Upper Castle) or Oberstadt (Upper Town) is the upper section of the medieval municipality of Regensberg, Switzerland, which was founded as a hilltop fortified settlement. The 13th-century Regensberg Castle is located in Oberburg, which is enclosed by the town wall, partly formed by two rows of houses which were constructed in the late 17th century. Also within the square is a 57 m (187 ft)-deep water well. Regensberg Reformed Church overlooks the main square. Beside it is the round tower (German: rundturm), the only remnant of the castle.

Oberburg is separated from Unterburg (lower castle), likely built in the 14th century, by a gate.

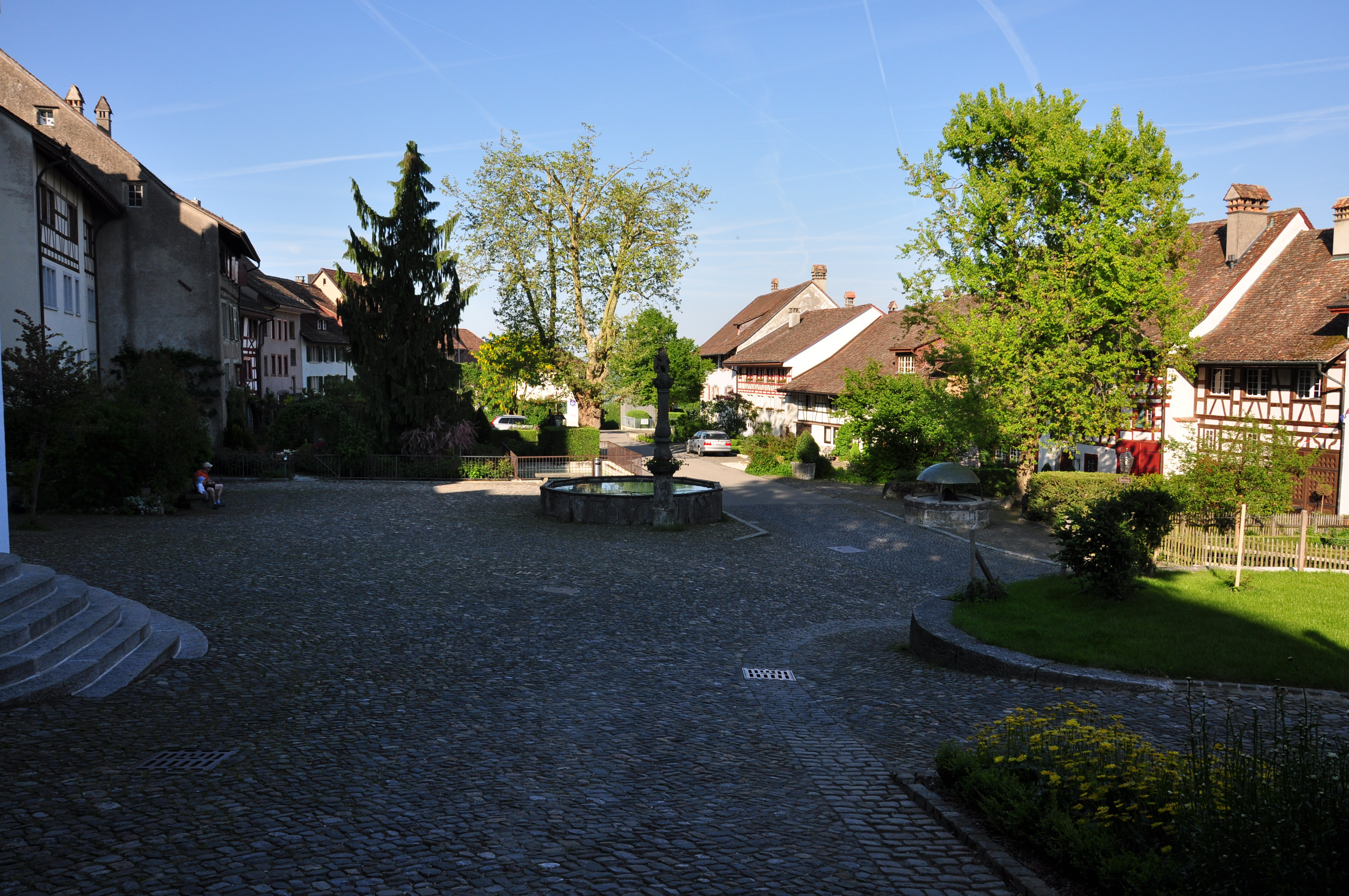
The fountain (centre) and well (right)

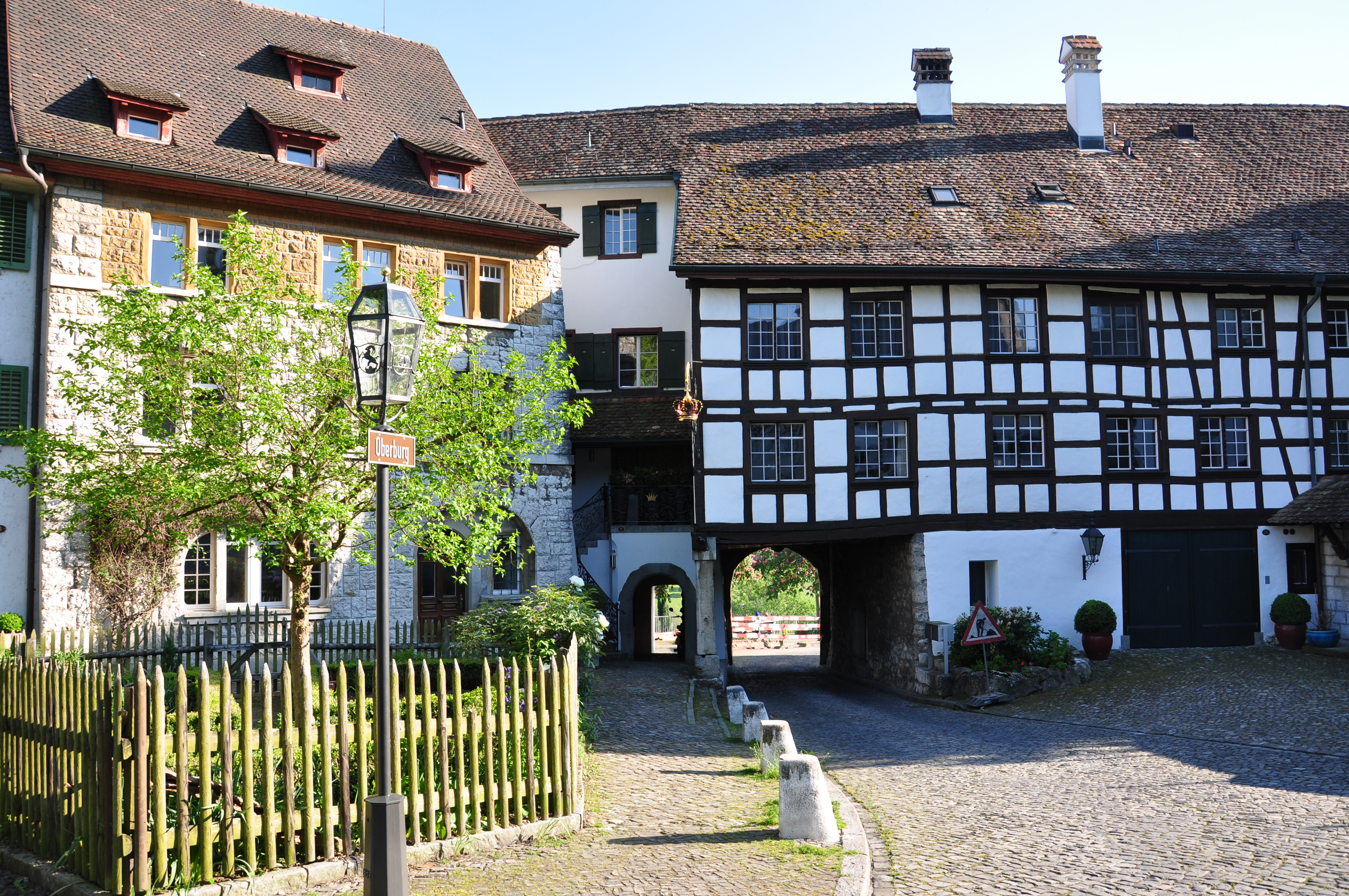
Gate to and from Unterburg, looking south

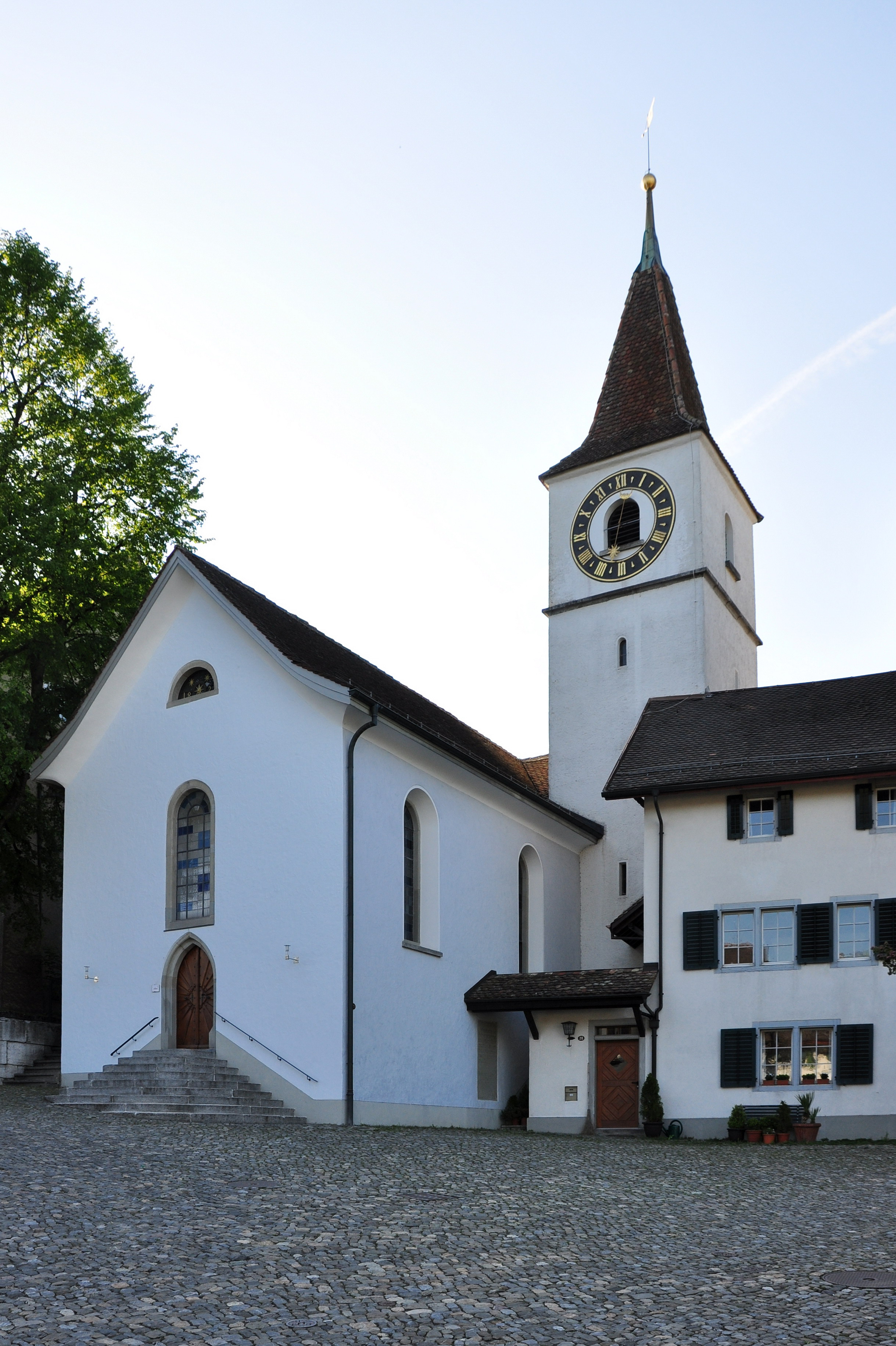
Regensberg Reformed Church

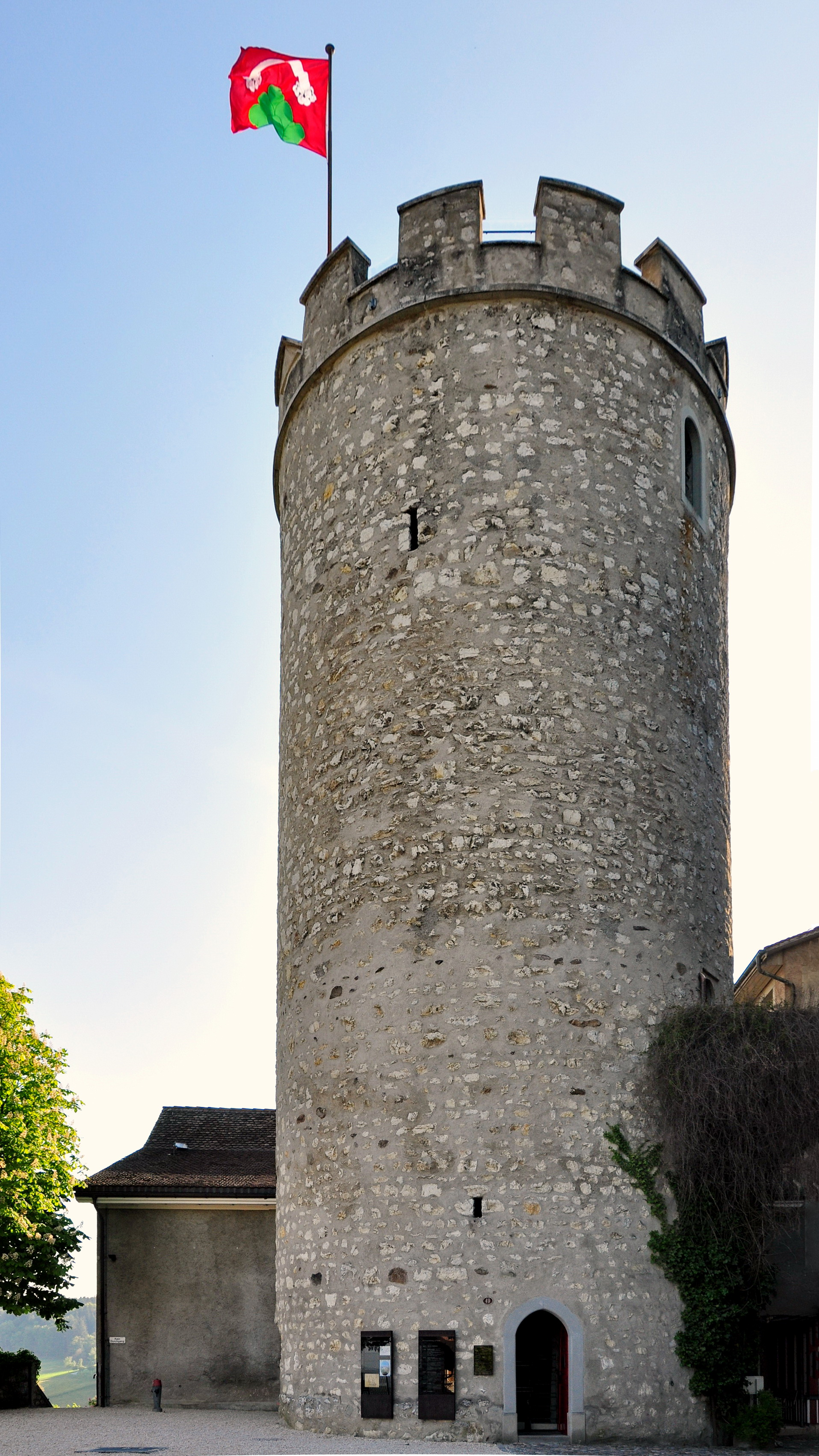
Round tower
