= Matthäus Merian the Elder =

Swiss-born engraver and publisher (1593–1650)

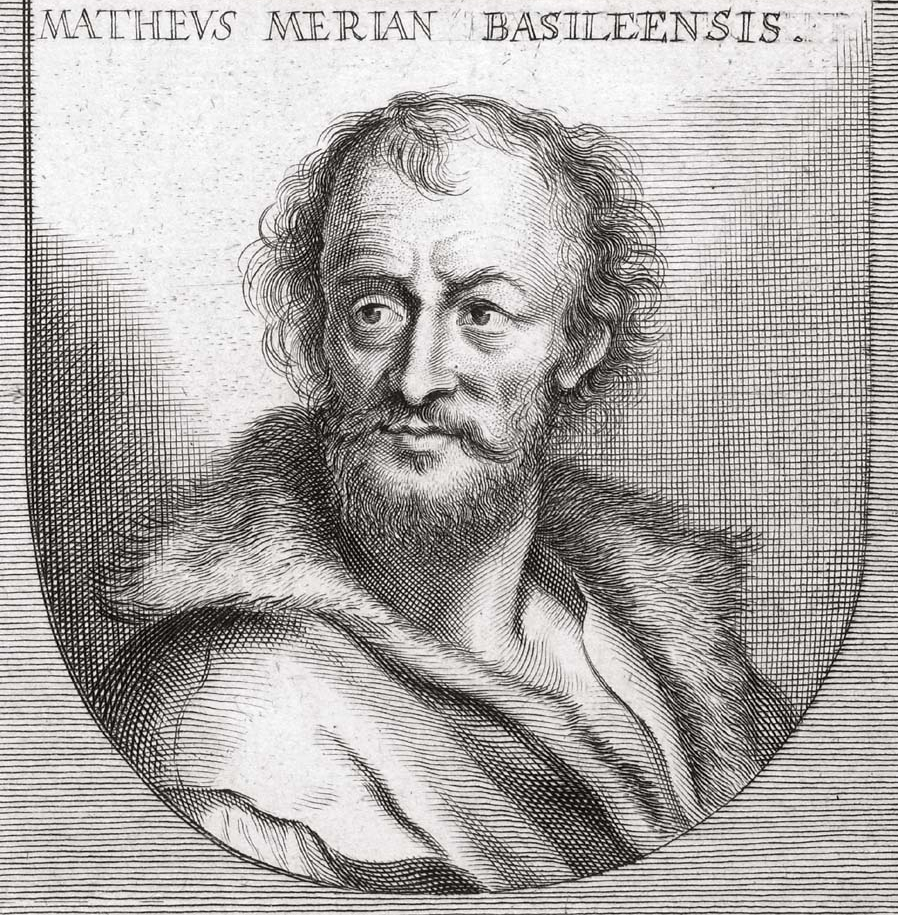
Engraving of Matthäus Merian by Joachim von Sandrart

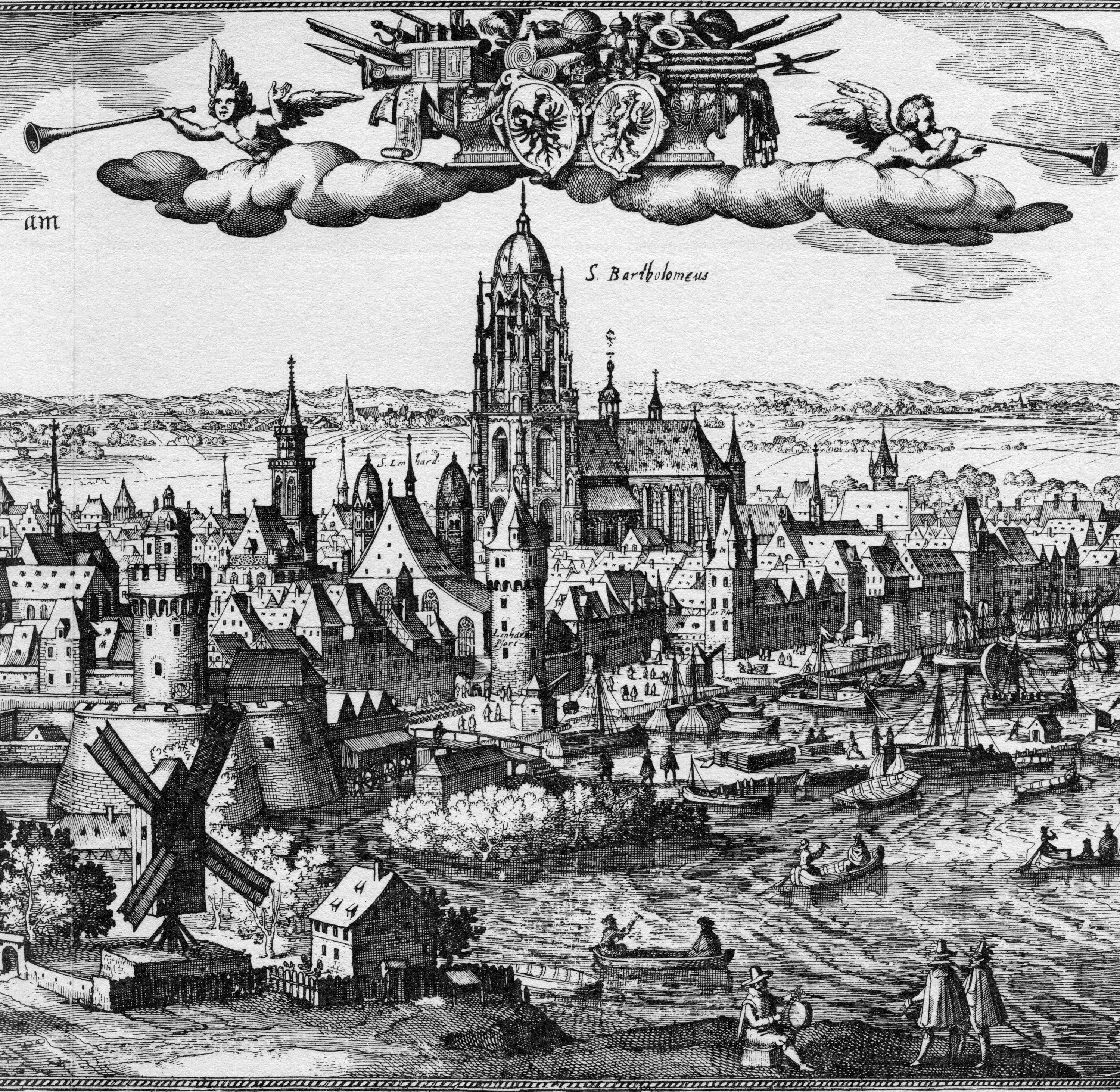
Frankfurt c. 1612; engraving by Matthäus Merian

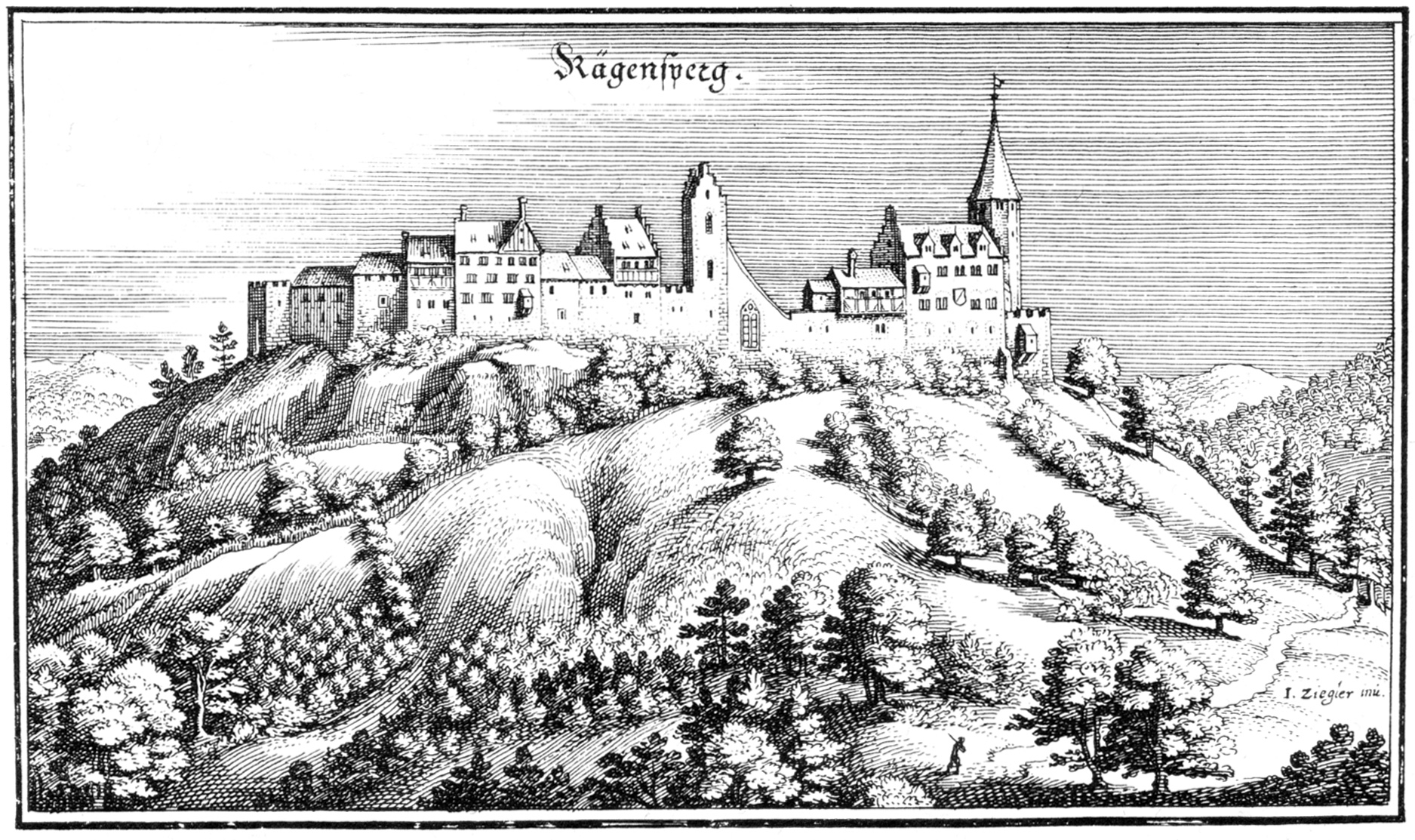
The castle and the town of Regensberg in Topographia Helvetiae, c. 1650

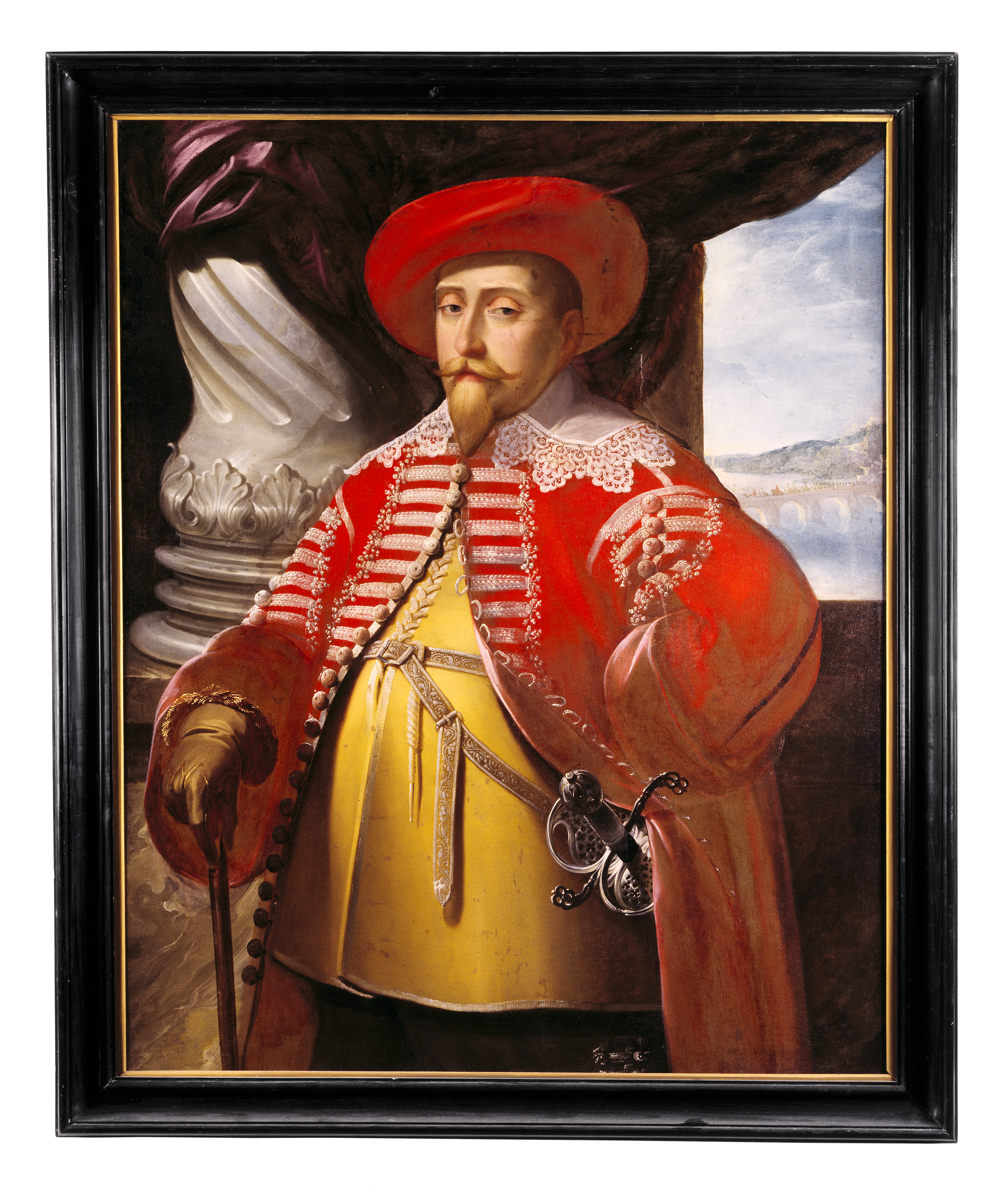
Gustav II Adolf in Polish 'delia' coat, painting by Matthäus Merian, 1632

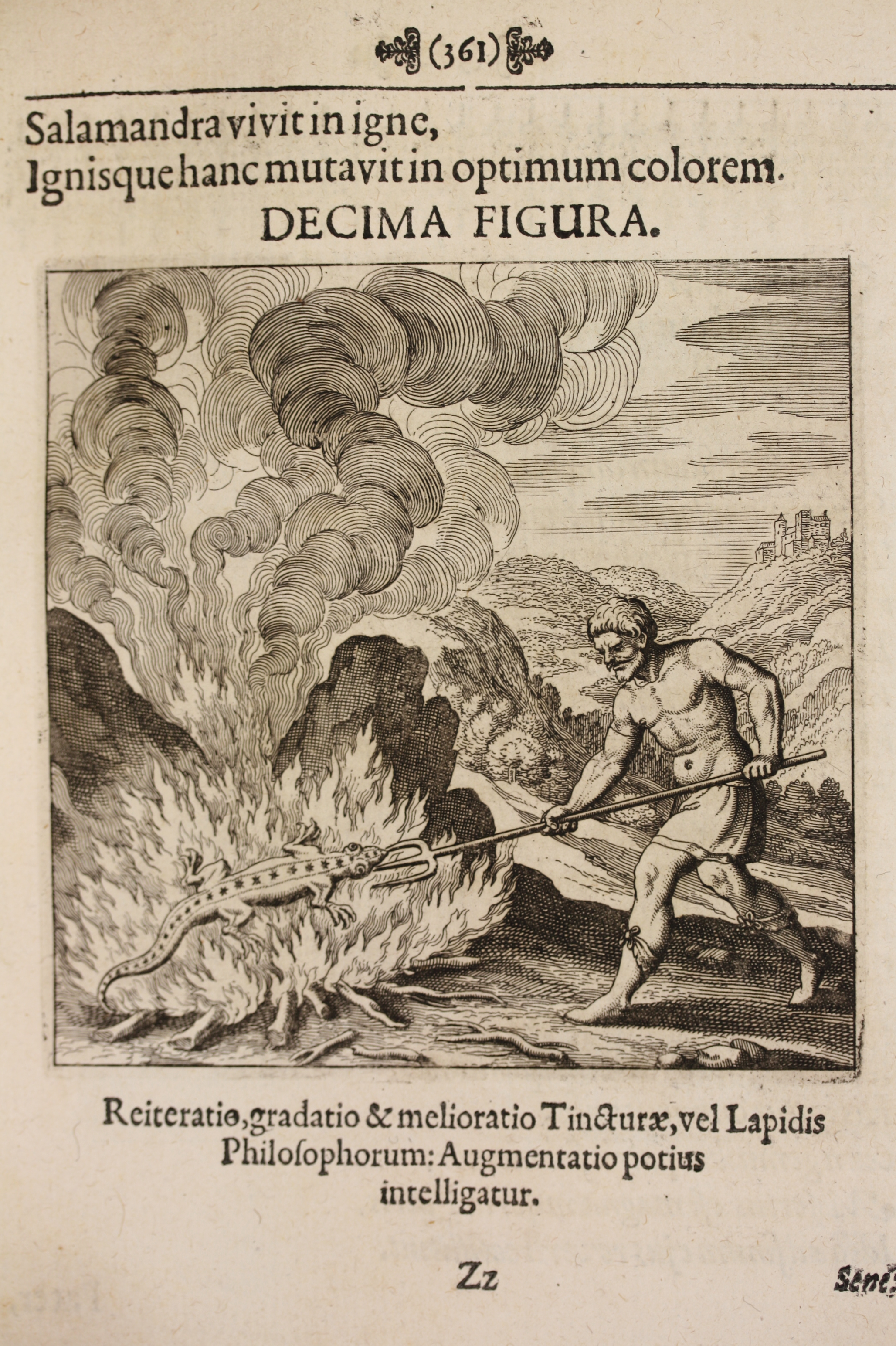
Alchemical illustration, Musaeum Hermeticum, 1678

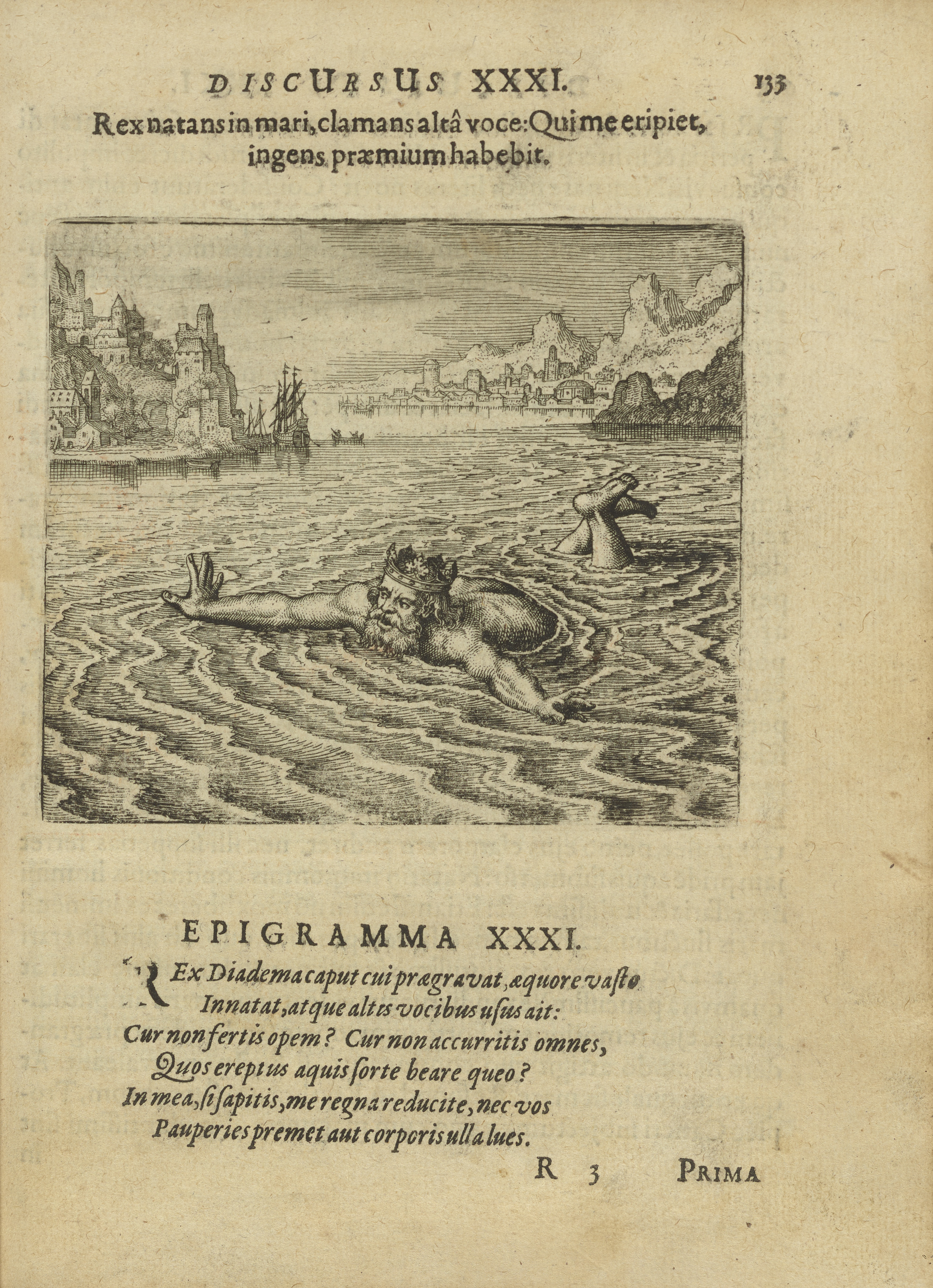
Discursus XXXI, Epigramma XXXI, from Atalanta Fugiens, 1618

Matthäus Merian der Ältere (or "Matthew", "the Elder", or "Sr."; 22 September 1593 – 19 June 1650) was a Swiss-born engraver who worked in Frankfurt, Germany for most of his career, where he also ran a publishing house. He was a member of the patrician Basel Merian family.

== Biography ==
=== Early life and marriage ===
Born in Basel, Merian learned the art of copperplate engraving in Zürich. He next worked and studied in Strasbourg, Nancy, and Paris, before returning to Basel in 1615. The following year he moved to Oppenheim, Germany where he worked for the publisher Johann Theodor de Bry, who was the son of renowned engraver and traveler Theodor de Bry.

In 1617, Merian married Maria Magdalena de Bry, daughter of the publisher, and was for a time associated with the de Bry publishing house. In 1620, when Oppenheim was destroyed by fire during the Spanish occupation, they moved back to Basel, but three years later returned to Germany, this time to Frankfurt. They had four daughters and three sons, including Matthäus Merian the Younger. Maria Magdalena de Bry died in 1645 and the following year Matthäus married Johanna Sibylla Heim. Five years later, Matthäus died, leaving his wife with two small children, Anna Maria Sibylla Merian (born 1647), who later became a pioneering naturalist and illustrator, and a son, Maximilian, who died before his third birthday.

=== Later career ===
In 1623, Merian took over the publishing house of his father-in-law after de Bry's death. In 1626, he became a citizen of Frankfurt and could henceforth work as an independent publisher. He spent most of his working life in Frankfurt.

Early in his life, he had created detailed town plans in his unique style, e.g. a plan of Basel (1615) and a plan of Paris (1615). With Martin Zeiler (1589–1661), a German geographer, and later (c. 1640) with his own son, Matthäus Merian (der Jüngere, i.e. "the Younger" or "Jr.") (1621–1687), he produced a series of Topographia. The 21-volume set was collectively known as the Topographia Germaniae. It includes numerous town plans and views, as well as maps of most countries and a World Map—it was such a popular work that it was re-issued in many editions. He also took over and completed the later parts and editions of the Grand Voyages and Petits Voyages, originally started by de Bry in 1590, and included volumes India Orientalis and America Occidentalis.

Merian's work inspired the Suecia Antiqua et Hodierna by Erik Dahlberg. The German travel magazine Merian is named after him.

He was also noted for the finesse of his alchemical illustrations, in books such as the Musaeum Hermeticum (1678) and Atalanta Fugiens (1618). He undertook the engravings for the encyclopaedic work of insect natural history De Serpentibus, compiled by John Jonston. This tradition would be taken up by his daughter.

Matthäus Merian died after several years of illness in 1650 in Langenschwalbach, near Wiesbaden.

After his death, his sons Matthäus Jr. and Caspar took over the publishing house. They continued publishing the Topographia Germaniae and the Theatrum Europaeum under the name Merian Erben (i.e. Merian Heirs).

== See also ==
- Topographia Galliae
