= Meryan =

Meryan may refer to:

- Meryan people, a historic ethnic group of Russia
- Meryan language, an extinct Uralic language
- Meryan Rodnovery, a religious movement of Russia
- Maryan, Iran (disambiguation), or Meryan, several places in Iran

== See also ==
- Merya (disambiguation)
- Merian (disambiguation)
- Maryan (disambiguation)
