= Regensberg =

- Municipality
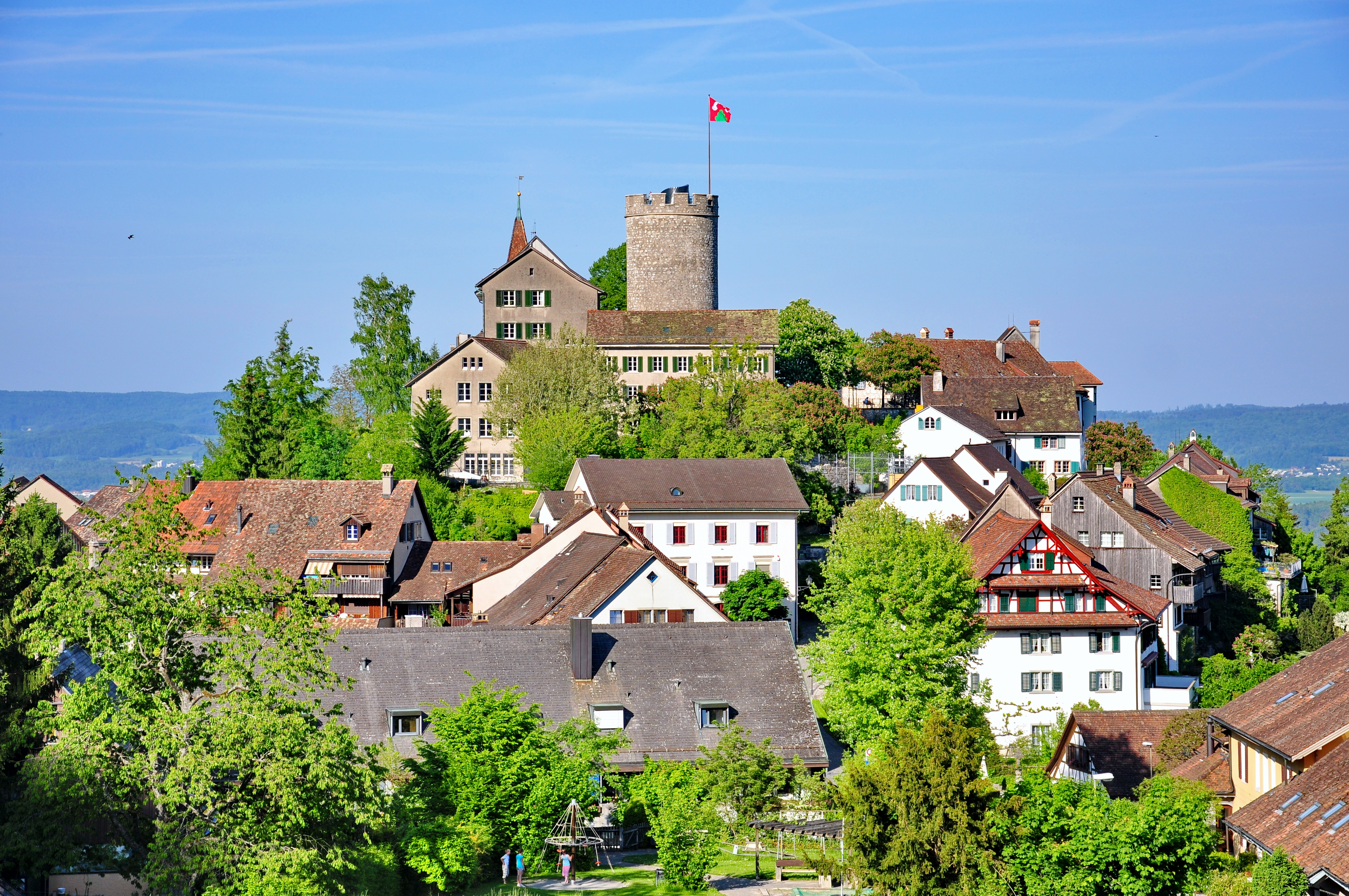
- Regensberg pictured in 2010

- Flag Coat of arms
- Location of Regensberg
- Location within Switzerland Location within Canton of Zurich
- Coordinates: 47°29′N 8°26′E
- Country: Switzerland
- Canton: Zurich
- District: Dielsdorf

Government
  - Mayor: Matthias Reetz

Area
  - Total: 2.39 km^{2} (0.92 sq mi)
- Elevation: 617 m (2,024 ft)

Population (December 2020)
  - Total: 459
  - Density: 192/km^{2} (497/sq mi)
- Time zone: UTC+01:00 (CET)
  - Summer (DST): UTC+02:00 (CEST)
- Postal code: 8158
- SFOS number: 95
- ISO 3166 code: CH-ZH
- Surrounded by: Boppelsen, Buchs, Dielsdorf, Oberweningen, Schleinikon, Steinmaur
- Website: www.regensberg.ch

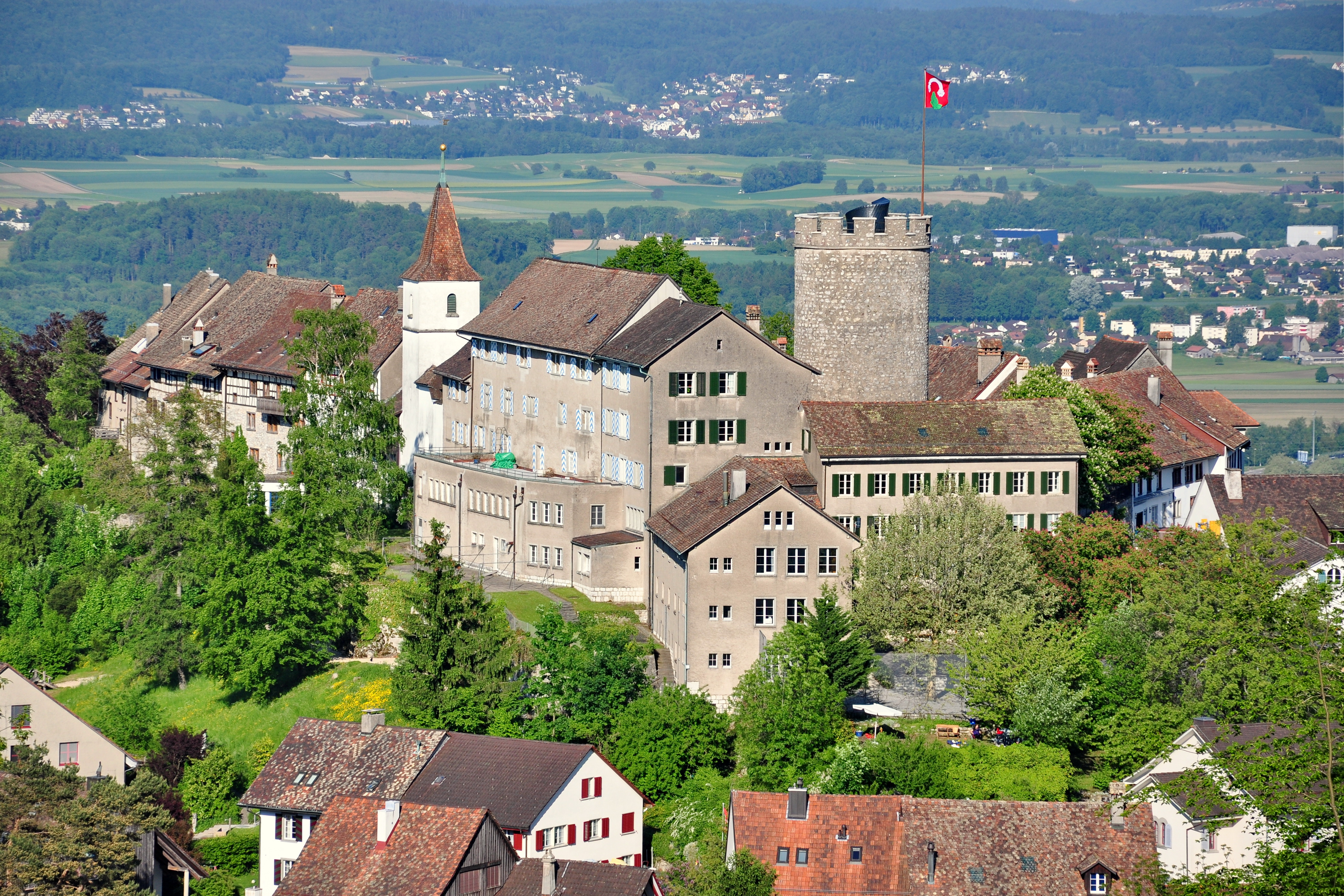
Regensberg Oberstadt with the tower of the former Regensberg Castle

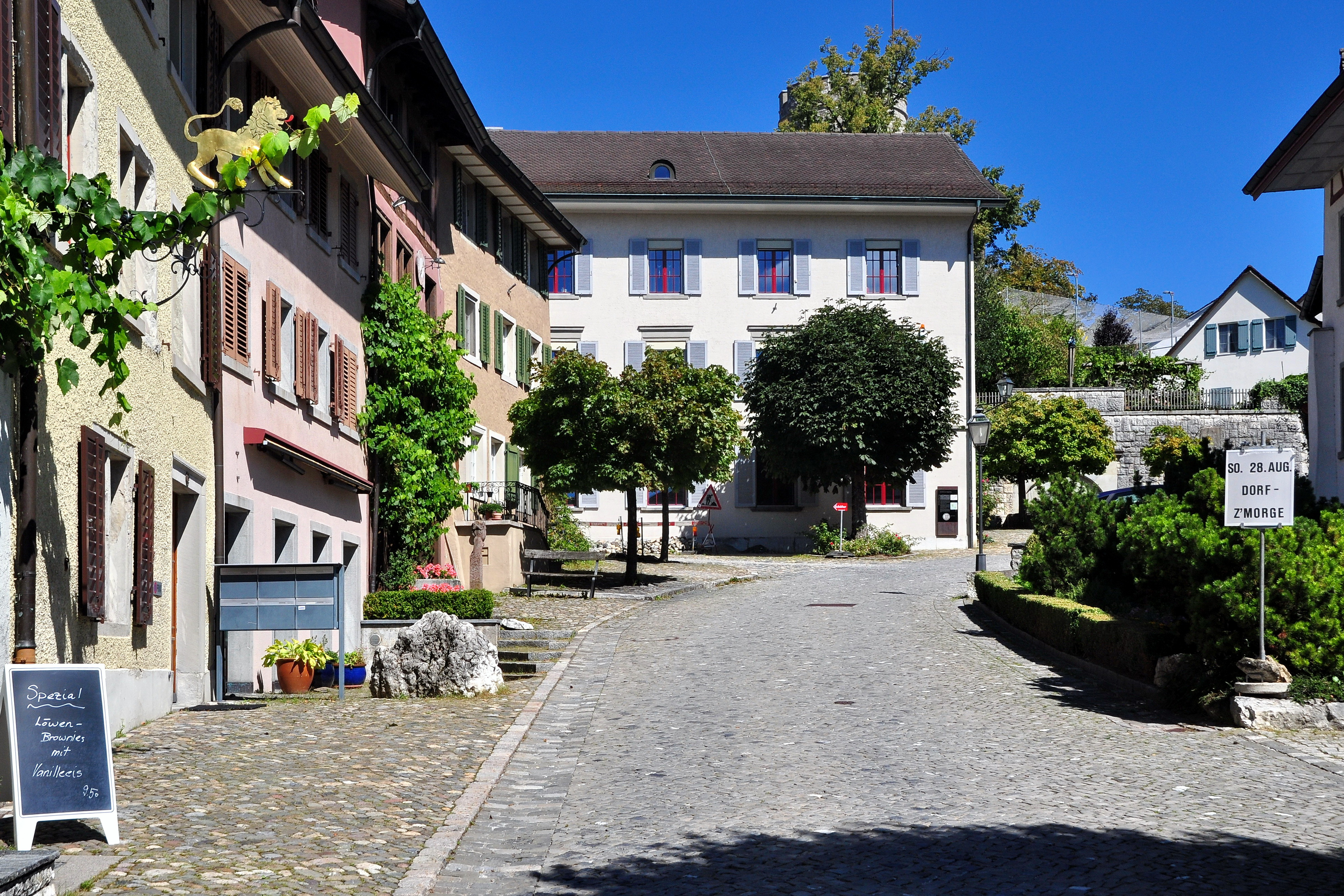
Unterburg, the district outside of the former town walls

Regensberg (Swiss Standard German pronunciation: [ˈreːɡn̩sbɛrɡ]) is a municipality in the Dielsdorf District of the Swiss canton of Zurich. It is located just to the west of Dielsdorf municipality, on a 617 m (2,024 ft)-ridge of the Lägern.

== History ==
Regensberg was founded as a hilltop fortified settlement about 1245 by Baron Lüthold of Regensberg. The fortifications include a 21 m (69 ft)-high round tower dating from the 16th or 17th century and a 57 m (187 ft)-deep water well. Regensberg Reformed Church, originally dating from the 13th century, was rebuilt around 1540.

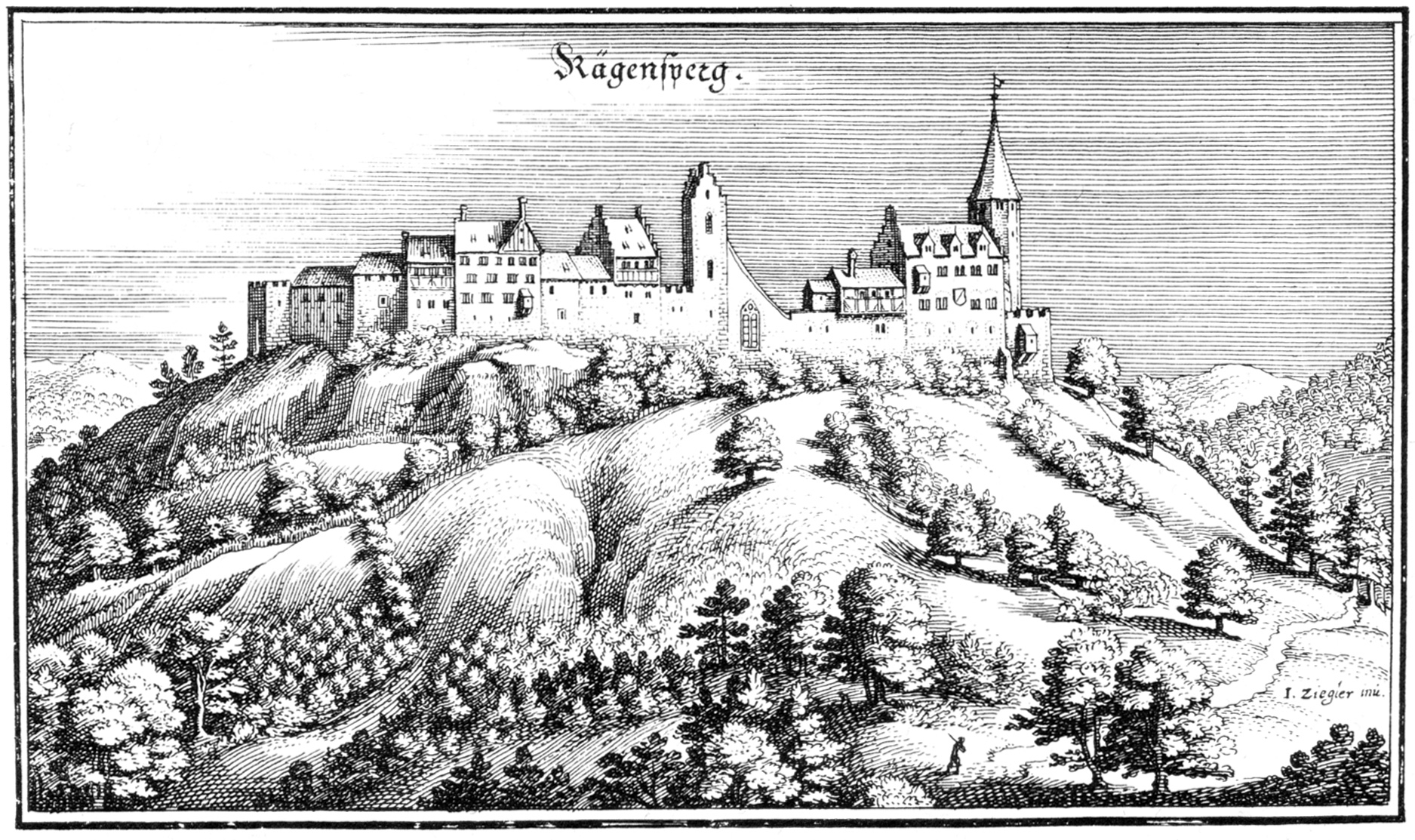
Regensberg in Topographia Helvetiae by Matthäus Merian (1645)

During the mid-13th century, relations between the Barons of Regensberg and the city of Zurich became strained. At about this same time, the barons began to argue with the Habsburgs over who would inherit the lands of the now-extinct Kyburg family. In 1267, the disputes led to war between the barons and the combined Zurich and Habsburg forces. The barons lost this war, and rapidly declined in power over the following half-century. In 1302, they sold Regensberg to the Habsburgs.

The Habsburgs established an Amt Regensberg, with a Habsburg-appointed Schultheiß leading the town council. Under the Habsburgs, the town expanded into a market town, and Regensberg Castle was the political centre of the area now corresponding to the Dielsdorf district.

In 1409, the Habsburg duke Frederick IV (known as Frederick of the Empty Pockets) had to pawn Regensberg to the city of Zurich; however, it wasn't until 1417 that Regensberg was fully owned by the city. They established an Obervogtei at Regensberg which ruled over thirteen surrounding villages.

In 1540, the upper castle burned down, but the lower gates and the donjon survived because they were separated from the upper castle by a deep ditch. The upper castle was rebuilt the following year. During the Reformation in Zürich, St. Martin's Abbey on Zürichberg at Fluntern was demolished. Stone blocks and two bells from the abbey were brought by ox cart to the church at Regensberg to rebuild it.

Following the collapse of the Swiss Ancien Régime in 1798, Regensburg became part of the district of Bülach. In 1803, with the Act of Mediation, Regensberg became the capital of its own sub-district. In 1831, this expanded to become the district of Regensberg. In 1871, the capital of the district moved to Dielsdorf, and Regensberg became an independent municipality in that district.

Historic attractions include the half-timbered "Rote Rose" house dating from 1540.

== Geography ==
Aerial view (1955)

Regensberg has an area of 2.4 km^{2} (0.93 sq mi). Of this area, 34.5% is used for agricultural purposes, while 56.7% is forested. The rest of the land, 8.8%, is settled.

== Demographics ==
Regensberg has a population (as of 31 December 2020) of 459. As of 2007, 16.3% of the population was made up of foreign nationals. Over the last ten years the population has decreased at a rate of -1.3%. Most of the population (as of 2000) speaks German (93.0%), with French being second-most-common ( 1.6%) and English being third ( 1.2%).

In the 2007 election, the most popular party was the Swiss People's Party, which received 31.1% of the vote. The next three most popular parties were the FDP (17.9%), the Green Party (14.5%) and the SPS (13.7%).

The age distribution of the population (as of 2000): children and teenagers (0–19 years old) make up 23.8% of the population, while adults (20–64 years old) make up 65.9% and seniors (over 64 years old) make up 10.3%. In Regensberg about 86.8% of the population (between age 25-64) have completed either non-mandatory upper secondary education or additional higher education (either university or a Fachhochschule).

Regensberg has an unemployment rate of 1.48%. As of 2005, there were eighteen people employed in the primary economic sector and about six businesses involved in this sector. Fourteen people are employed in the secondary sector and there are three businesses in this sector. 121 people are employed in the tertiary sector, with sixteen businesses in this sector.

== Hiking ==
Regensberg is at the eastern end of an 11 km (6.8 mi) long hiking trail over the Lägern mountain to Baden.
