= Meria, Ozurgeti Municipality =

Meria მერია
- Village
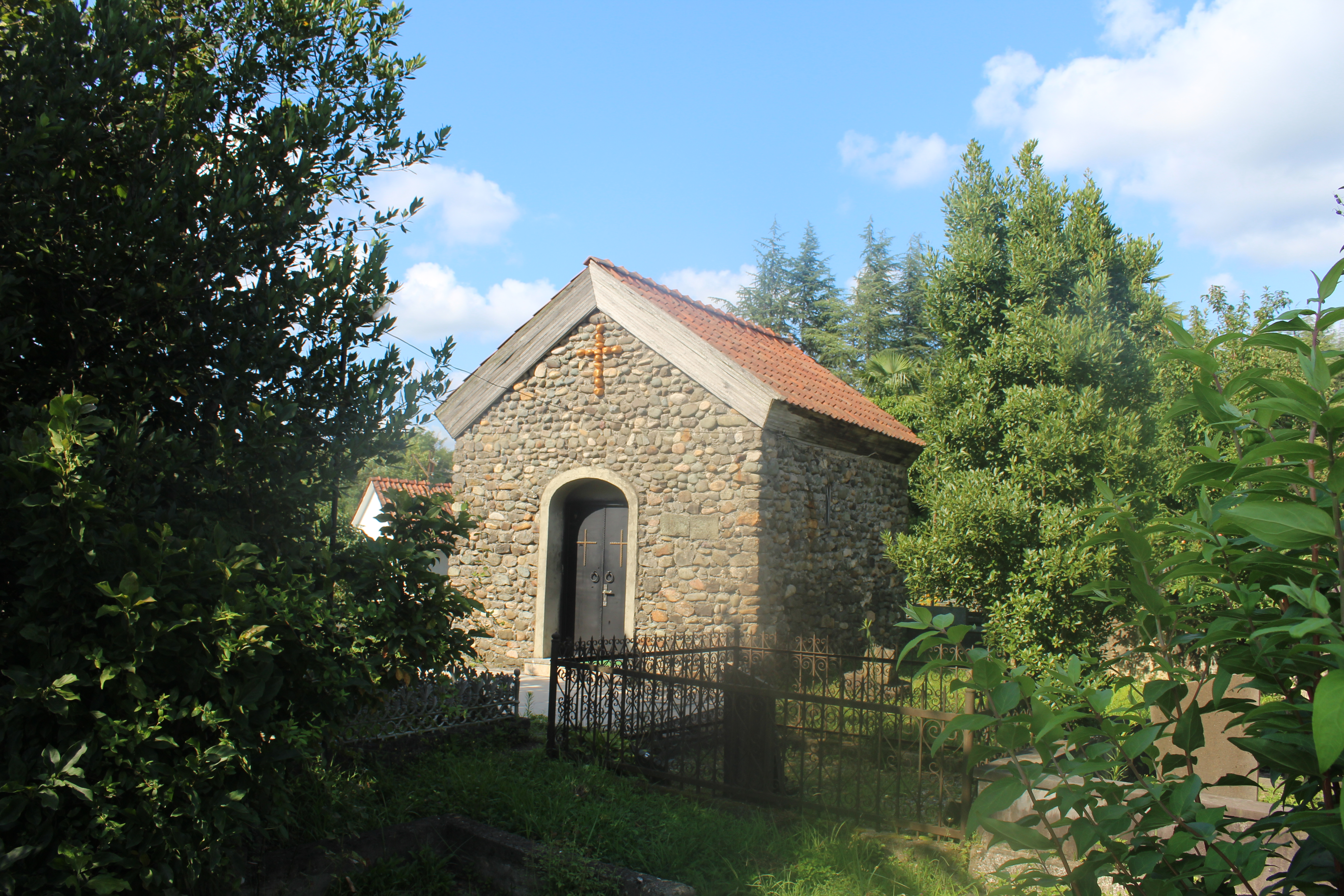

- Location within Georgia Location within Guria
- Coordinates: 41°56′37″N 41°53′37″E
- Country: Georgia
- Mkhare: Guria
- Municipality: Ozurgeti
- Elevation: 30 m (98 ft)

Population (2014)
  - Total: 1,494
- Time zone: UTC+4 (Georgian Time)

Meria (Georgian: მერია) is a village in the Ozurgeti Municipality of Guria in western Georgia.
