= Unterburg, Regensberg =

Area of Regensberg, Switzerland

Unterburg
- A 1955 aerial view of Regensberg, looking north. Unterburg begins lower left of centre
- Location: Regensberg, Switzerland
- Coordinates: 47.4824662°N 8.43784845°E
- West: Wehntalstrasse

Unterburg (English: Lower Castle) or Unterstadt (Lower Town) is the lower section of the medieval municipality of Regensberg, Switzerland, which was founded as a hilltop fortified settlement. The 13th-century Regensberg Castle is located in Oberburg (Upper Castle), which is enclosed by the town wall, partly formed by two rows of houses which were constructed in the late 17th century.

Unterburg was likely built in the 14th century, and is separated from Oberburg by a gate. It climbs a steady hill in an eastward direction from Wehntelstrasse in Regensberg's old town (altstadt), before turning north at the summit's gate.

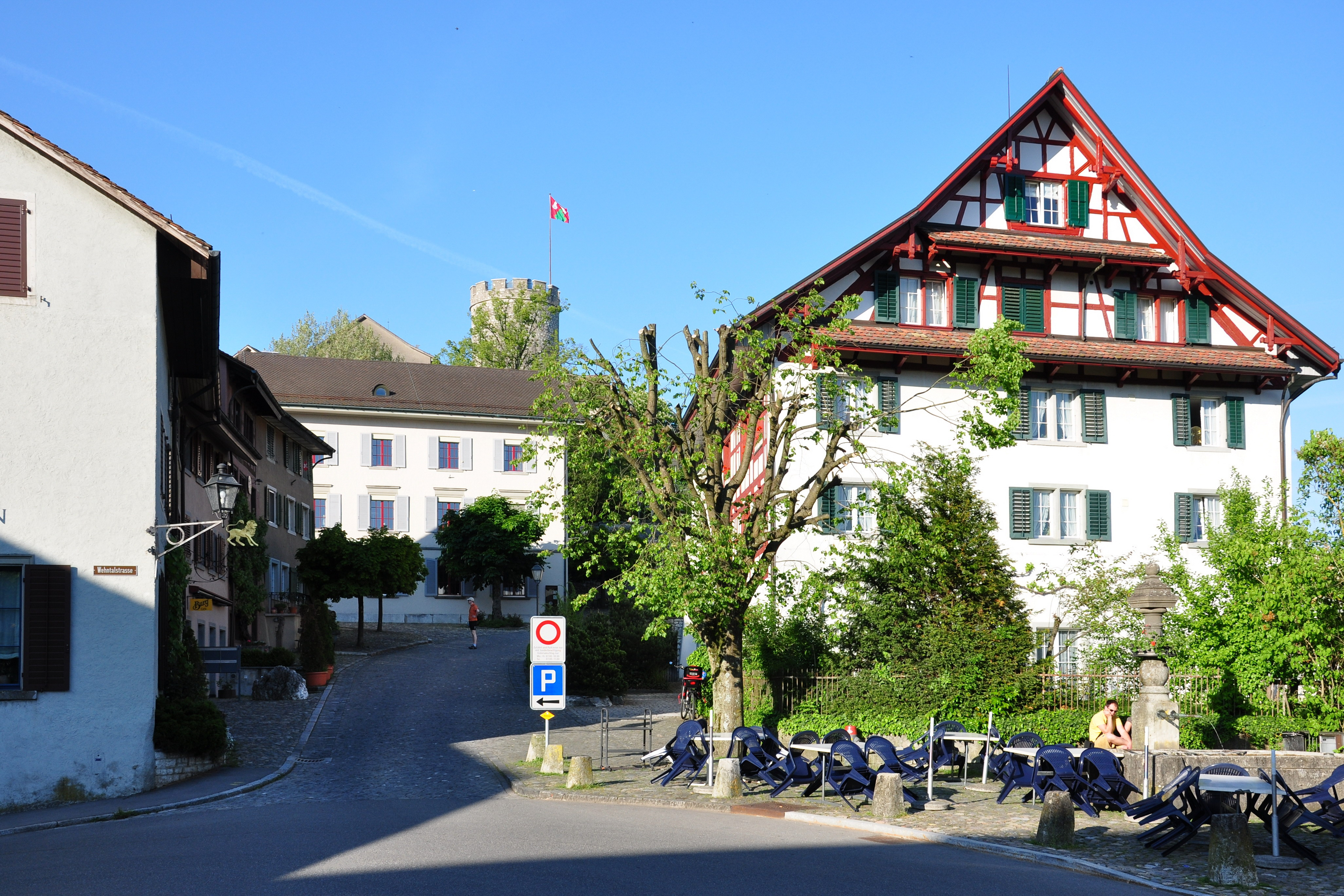
The beginning of Unterburg viewed from Wehntalstrasse, looking east

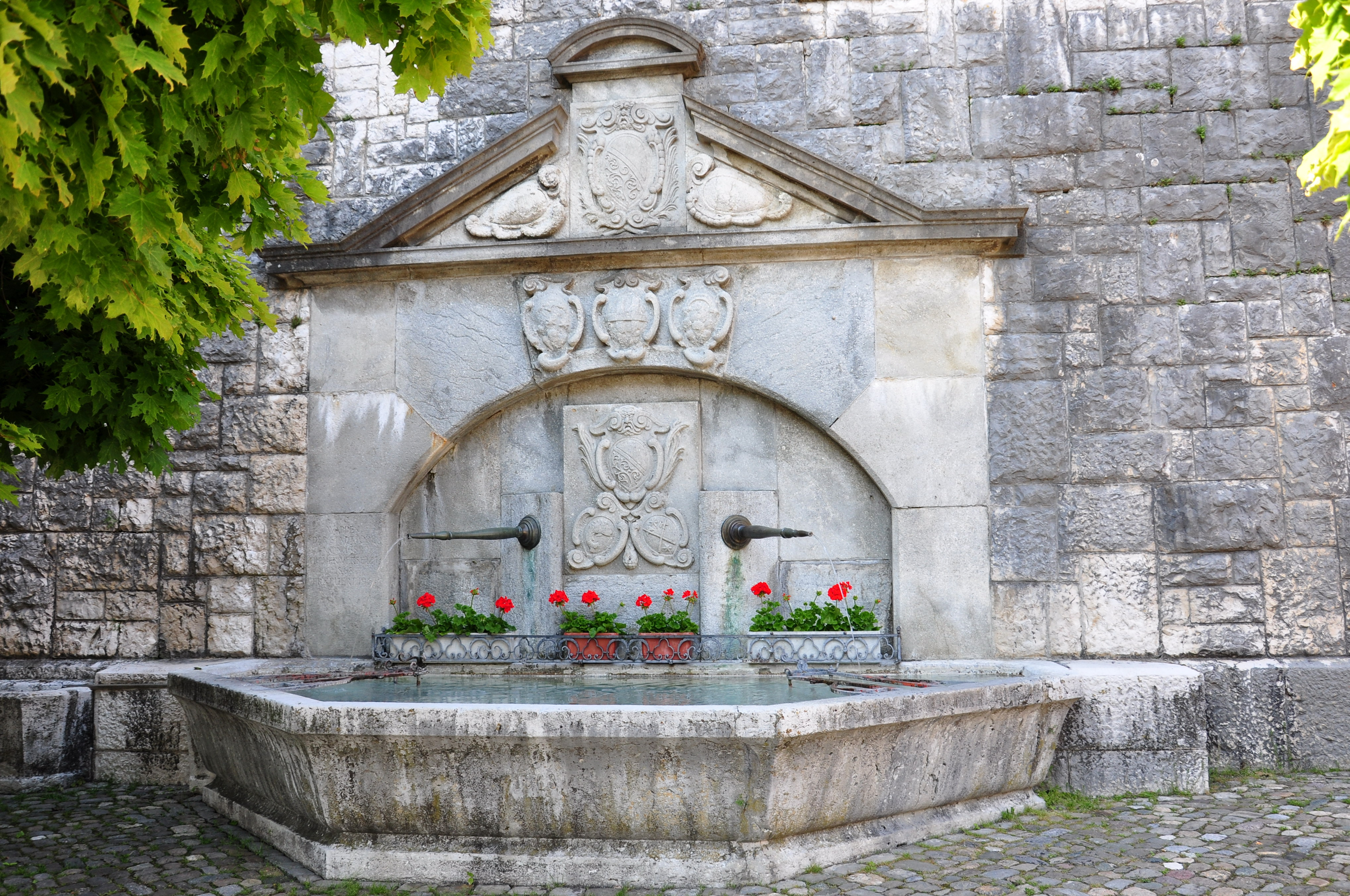
Schoolhouse fountain (Schulhausbrunnen) (1868)

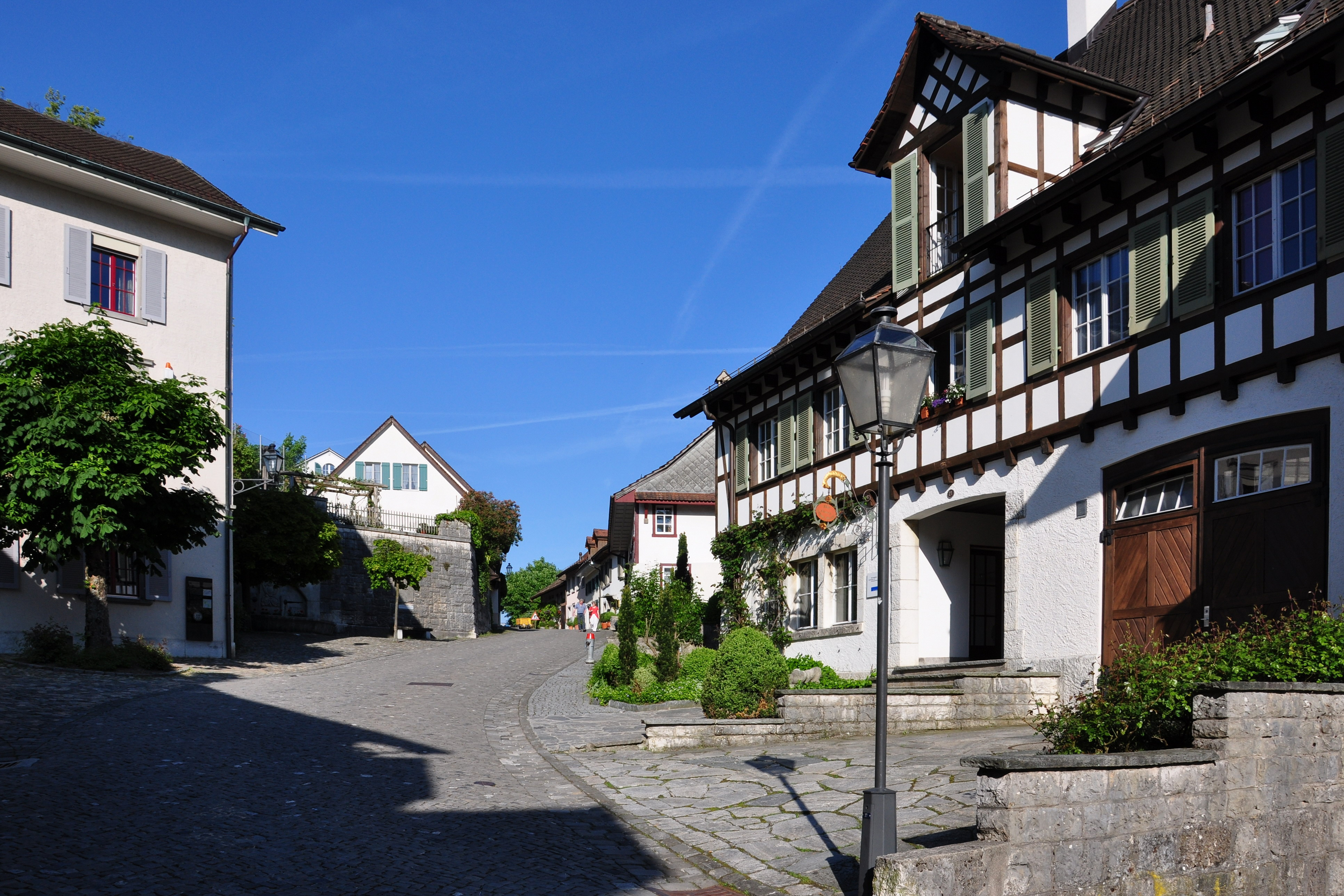
Passing through Regensberg's old town (altstadt)

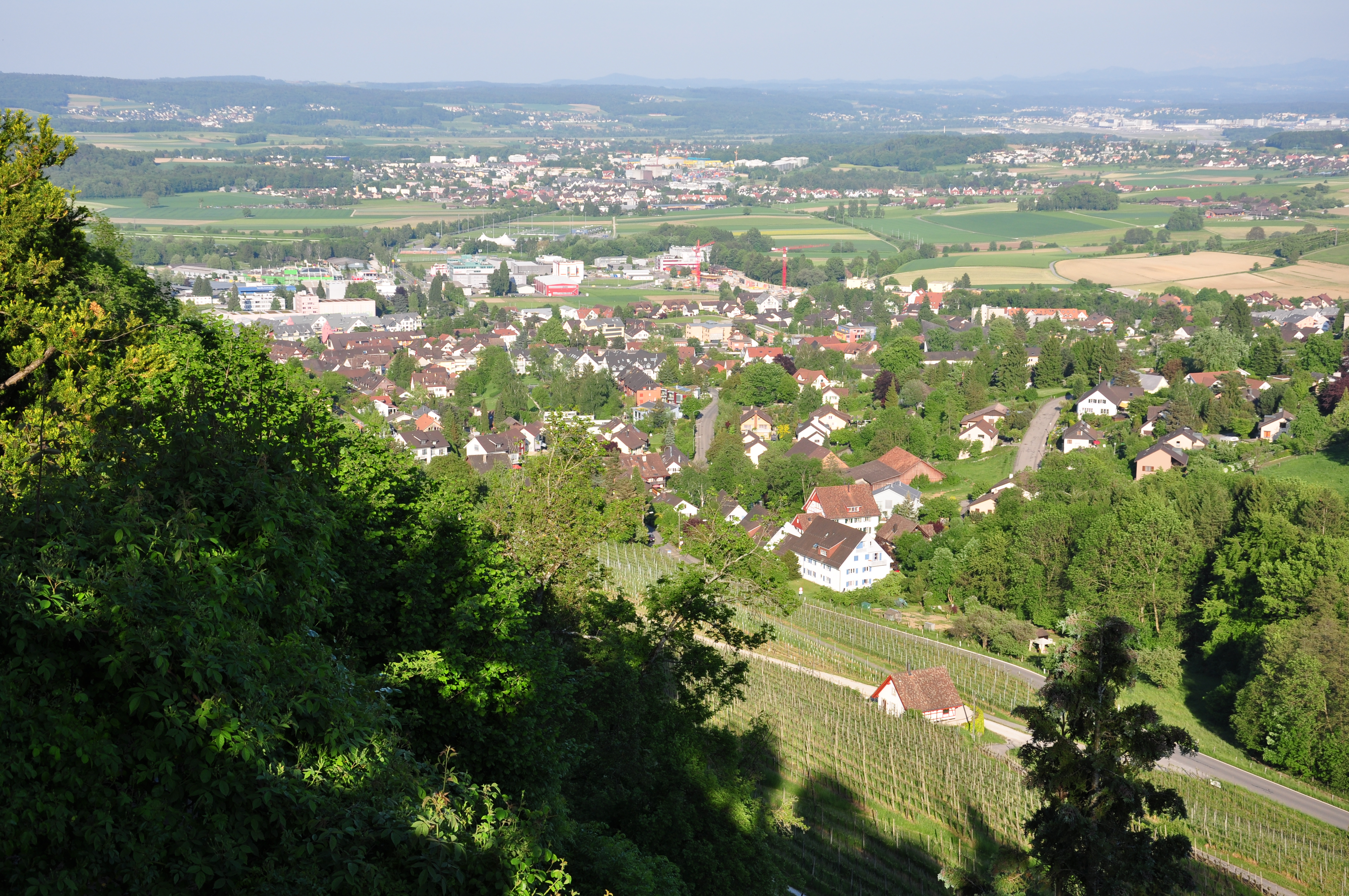
Looking east to Dielsdorf from just outside the gate to Oberburg

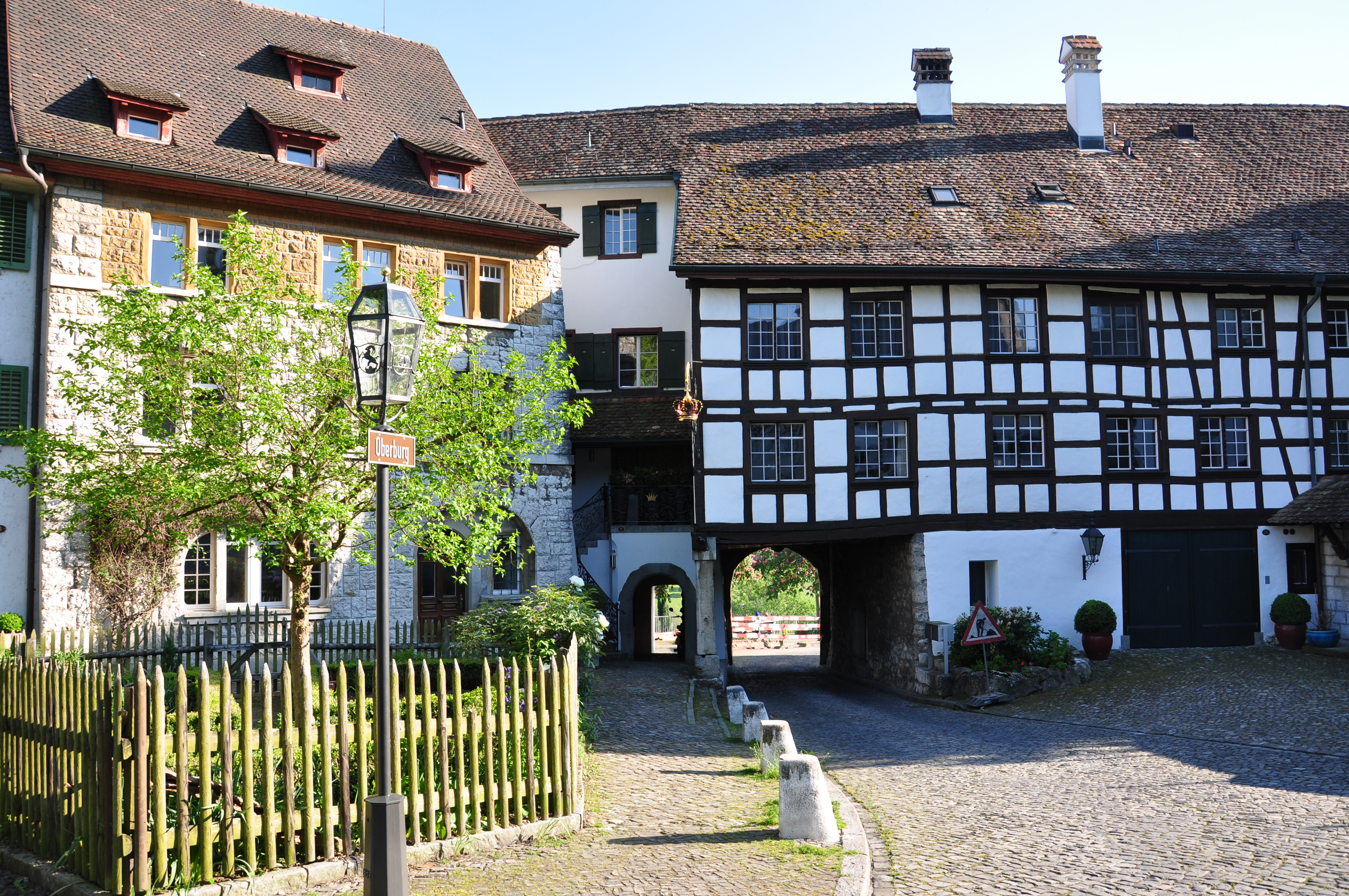
Gate, looking south from Oberburg
