= Merja (name) =

Merja is a Finnish feminine given name.

== Notable persons ==
- Merja Halmetoja, Finnish ice hockey player
- Merja Huttunen, Finnish writer
- Merja Jalo, Finnish writer
- Merja Kinnunen, Finnish sociologist
- Merja Kiviranta, Finnish former racing cyclist
- Merja Korhonen, Finnish volleyball player
- Merja Korpela, Finnish hammer thrower
- Merja Kuusisto, Finnish politician
- Merja Kyllönen, Finnish politician
- Merja Lahtinen, Finnish cross-country skier
- Merja Larivaara, Finnish actress
- Merja Mäkisalo-Ropponen, Finnish politician
- Merja Otava, Finnish writer
- Merja Rantanen, Finnish orienteer
- Merja Raski, Finnish singer and composer
- Merja Salo, Finnish photographer and professor
- Merja Satulehto, Finnish dancer
- Merja Savolainen, Finnish footballer
- Merja Sjöman, Finnish former footballer
- Merja Annele Suvas-Berger (Meiju Suvas), Finnish singer
- Merja Tynkkynen, Finnish writer
- Merja Wirkkala, Finnish singer
