= Merriam =

Merriam can refer to:

== People ==
- Alan P. Merriam (1923–1980), American ethnomusicologist
- Charles Edward Merriam (1874–1953), American political scientist
- Charles W. Merriam (1877–1961), American insurance businessman and politician
- Clinton Hart Merriam (1855–1942), American zoologist and anthropologist
- Clinton Levi Merriam (1824–1900), United States Representative from New York
- Eve Merriam (1916–1992), American poet
- Frank Merriam (1865–1955), American politician and 28th governor of California
- Gordon Phelps Merriam (1899–1999), American soldier and diplomat
- Henry Clay Merriam, American general
- John Campbell Merriam (1869–1945), American paleontologist
- William Rush Merriam (1849–1934), American politician and 11th governor of Minnesota
- George Merriam (1803–1880) and his brother Charles, founders of G. and C. Merriam, later Merriam-Webster
- Sarah A. L. Merriam (1971–), American lawyer and judge on the U.S. Court of Appeals for the Second Circuit

== Other uses ==
- Merriam, Kansas
- Merriam-Webster, a publishing company specializing in reference books
- Merriam's pocket mouse (Perognathus merriami)
- Merriam's dog- (Megacyon Merriami)
- Merriam's wild turkey (Meleagris gallopavo merriami)
