= Regensberg Castle =

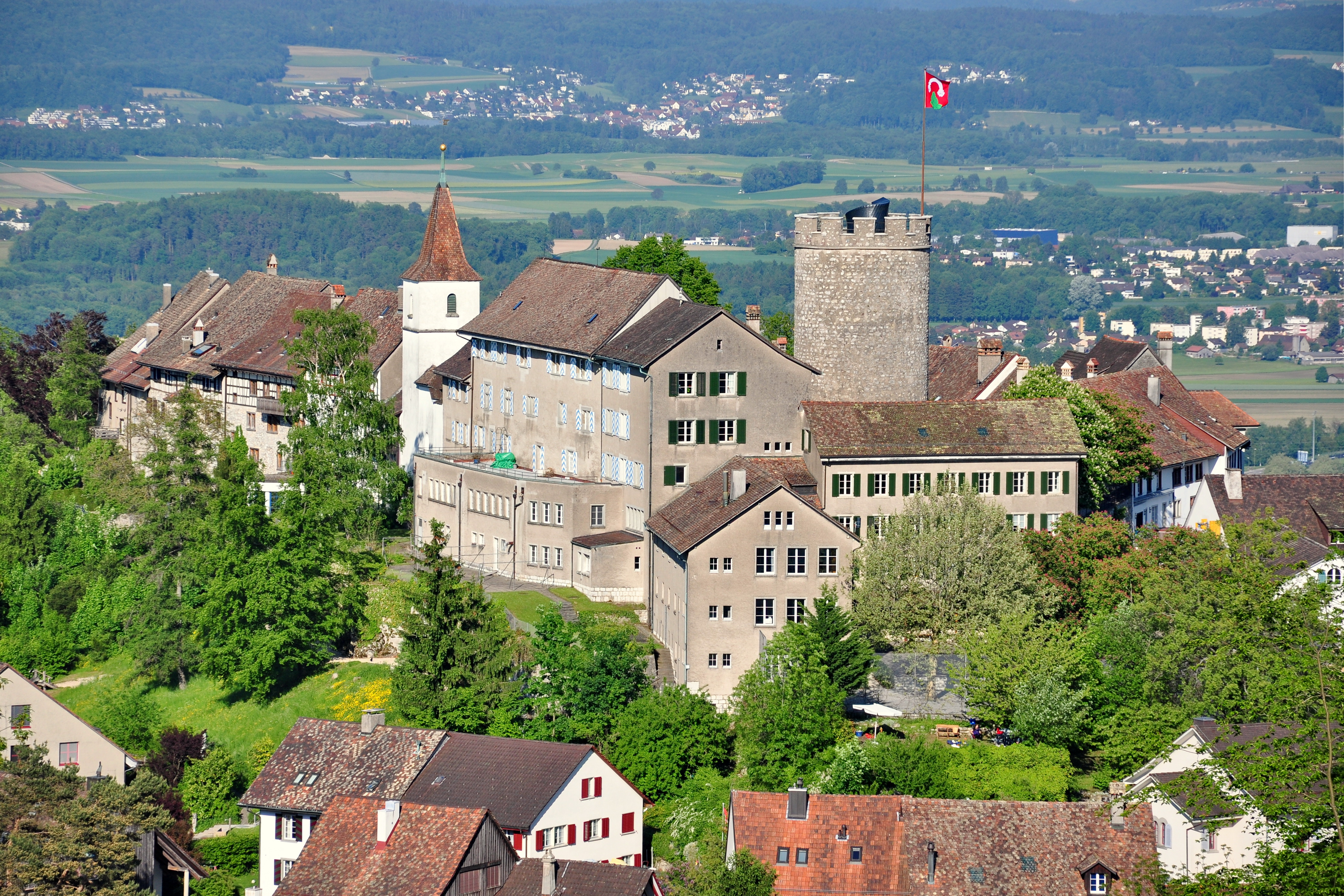
- Castle and Oberburg, Regensberg's upper town

- Location within Canton of Zürich Location within Switzerland

General information
- Architectural style: hill castle, later rebuilt as a palace
- Classification: Historic monument
- Location: Regensberg, Switzerland
- Coordinates: 47.482818°N 8.438136°E
- Construction started: c. 1245
- Completed: c. 1250

Regensberg Castle (Swiss German: Schloss Regensberg sometimes referred to Neu-Regensberg) is a hill castle which was built about the mid-13th century AD by the House of Regensberg in the Swiss municipality of Regensberg in the Canton of Zürich.

== Geography ==
The remains of the castle—the 21 m (69 ft) Rundturm ("round tower") and the former Palas—are located on the western ridge of the Lägern mountain chain, sitting at 617 m (2,024 ft) and overlooking the lower Glatt Valley. The municipality of Regensberg was founded as a hilltop fortified settlement. The Oberburg is the location of the castle and the inner town which is surrounded by a town wall. The Oberburg or Oberstadt fortifications include also the 57 m (187 ft) deep water well. The Unterburg was built outside of the town walls.

== Architecture and points of interest ==
=== Oberburg und Unterburg ===
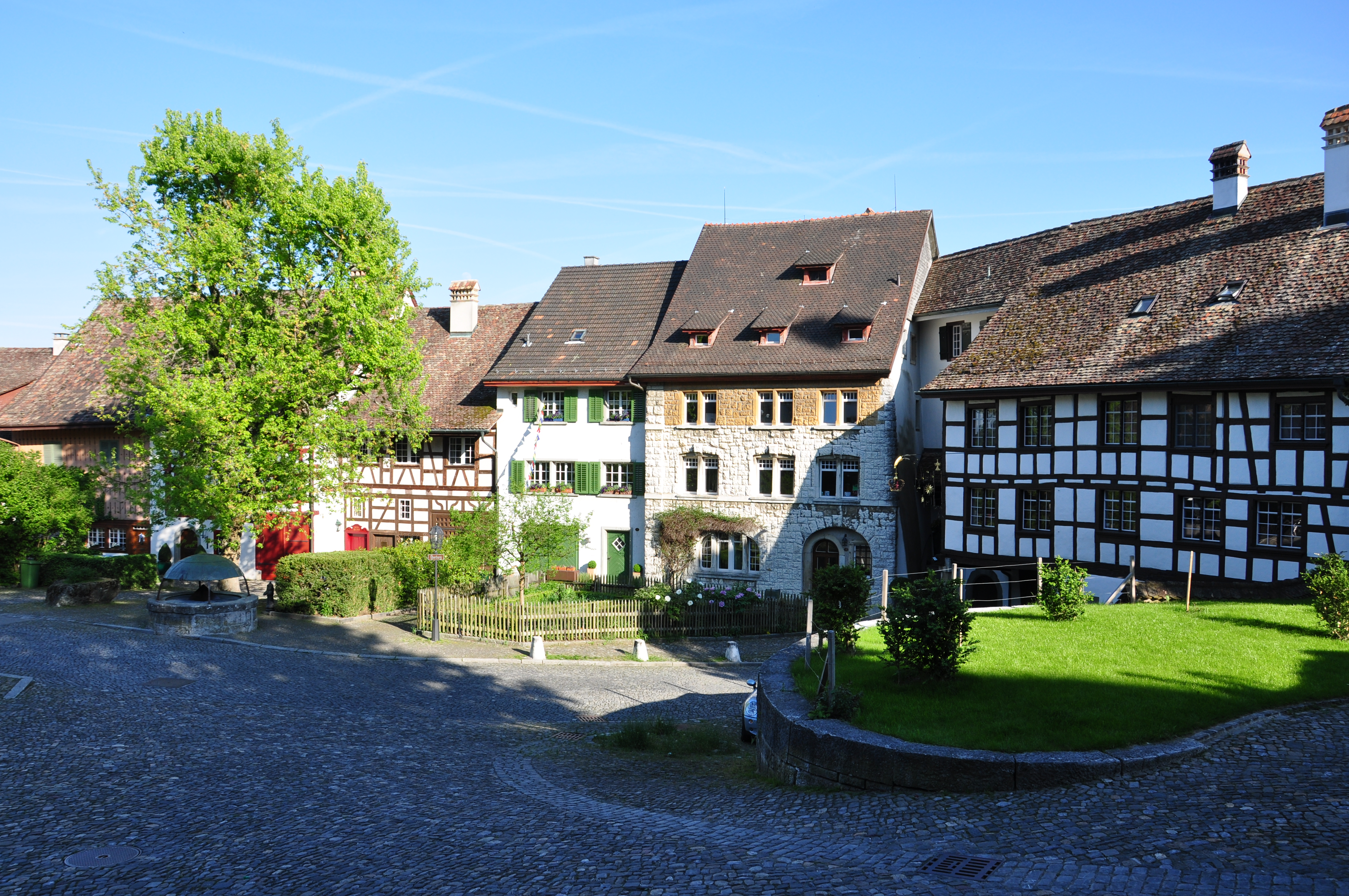
Oberburg and the water well

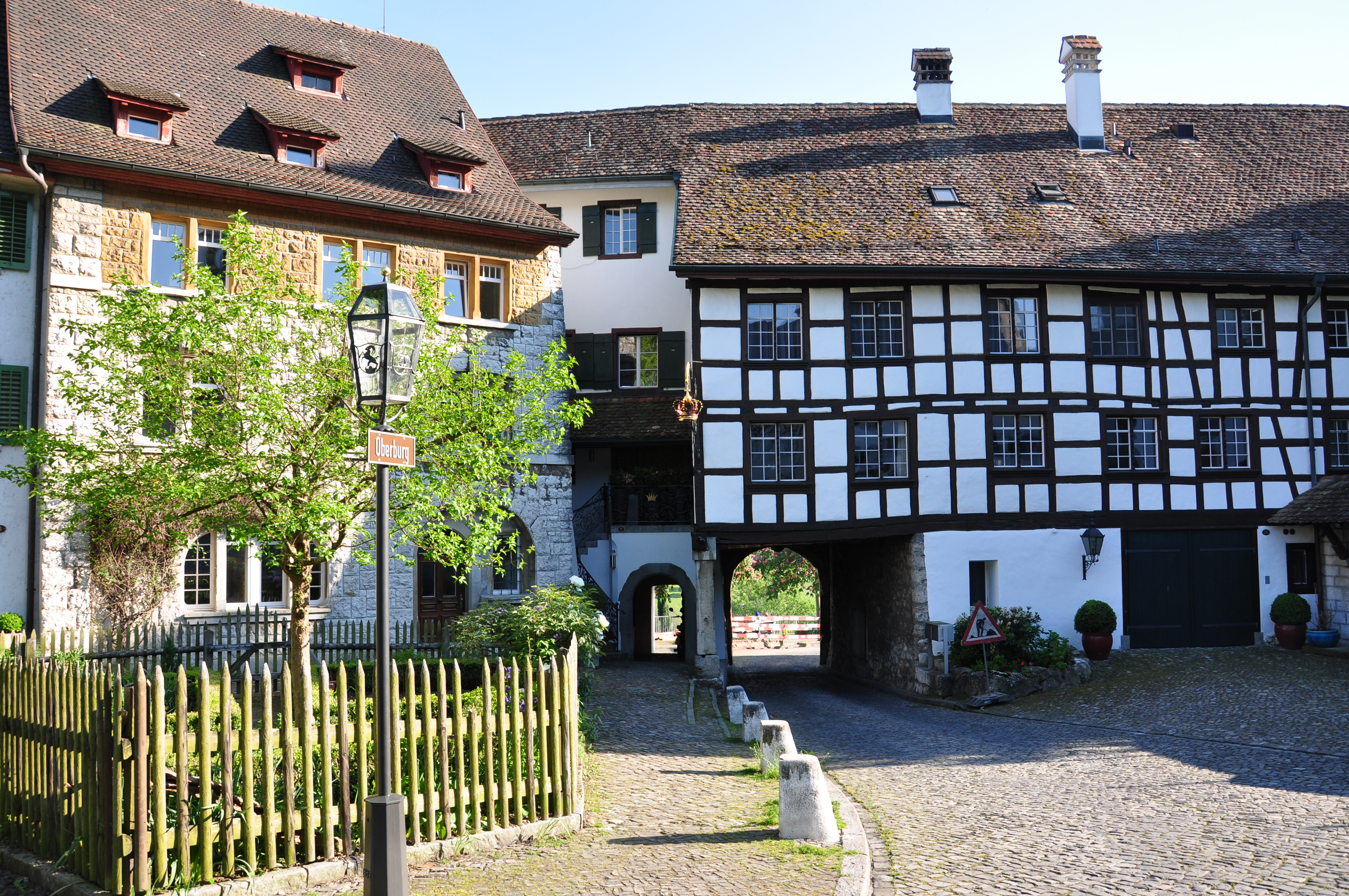
Gate between Oberburg and Unterburg

Regensberg was designed as a fortified castle town and built by then modern contemporary criteria. The so-called Upper Castle (Oberburg) comprises a rectangular plaza as main square which is surrounded two rows of houses, and into the limestone a 57 m (187 ft) deep water well was carved. The Lower Castle (Unterburg) or lower town (Unterstadt) was probably built in the 14th century nestled at the castle's hill outside of the town wall. Therefore, it was not involved in the modernization of the upper castle in 1689.

=== Rundturm ===
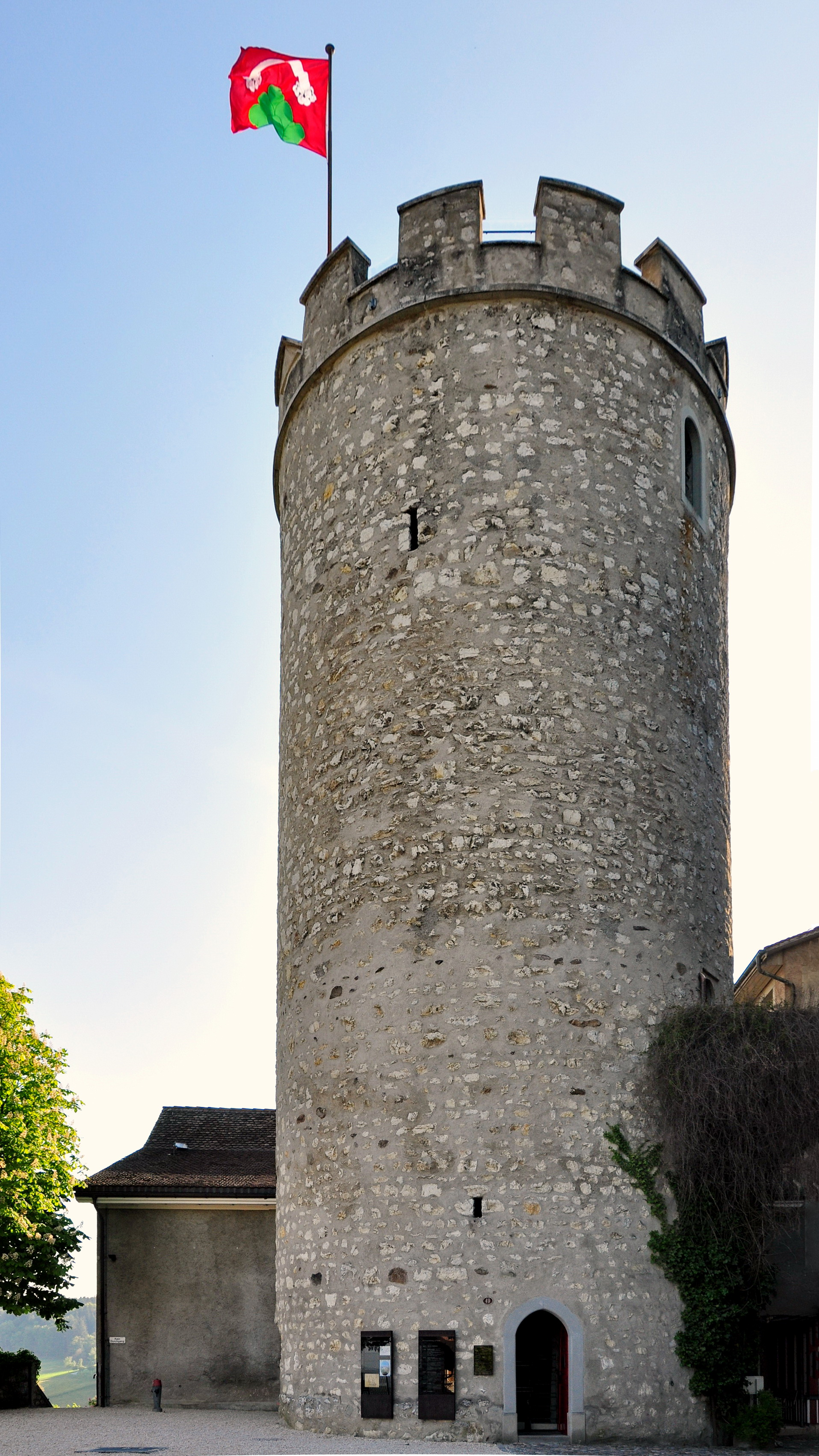
The so-called mid-13th-century Rundturm

The round tower (German: Rundturm) is the only remnant of the mid-13th-century castle and is largely in its original state of construction. Atypical for the north-eastern Switzerland, it was built as a five-storey keep made of local limestone, with a wall thickness of 3 m (9.8 ft) and a diameter of 9 m (30 ft) at its basement. The unique architectural design as round tower is presumably a reminiscence by Lütold V to his wife noblewomen Berta de Neuchâtel; in her native western Switzerland round towers then were disseminated.

Originally, the tower had an elevated entrance and an 11 m (36 ft) high spire roof which was destroyed by lightning in 1766. The tower then received its present completion battlements and a new bridge that connected it with the palace. In 1894 the current single-storey entrance was built and thereafter the tower became a popular tourist destination as a belvedere. A thorough renovation of the tower was done in 2009, and in its interior also was established a small exhibition on the history of the castle and town.

=== Palas and economic buildings ===
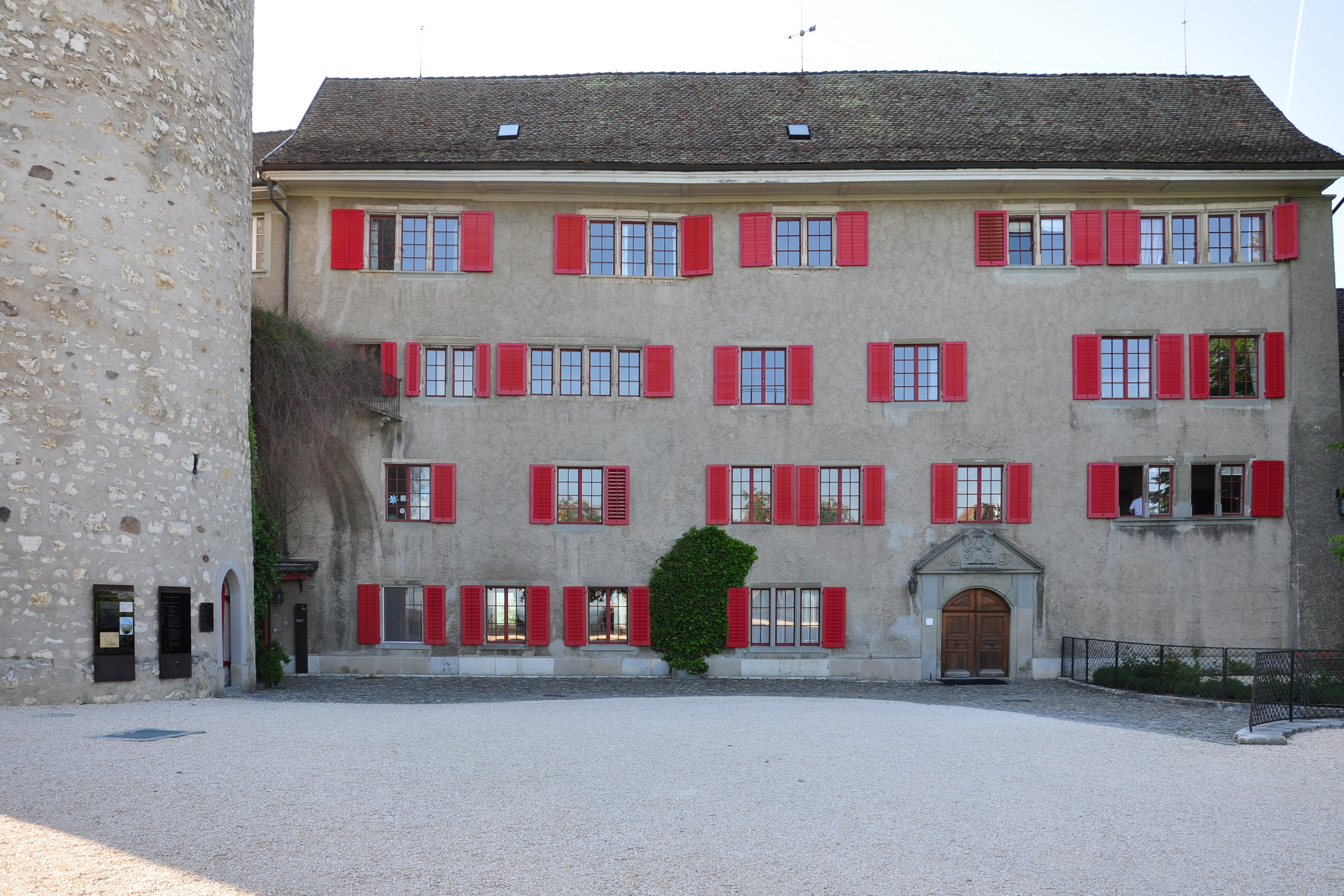
Palas and the tower

Situated in the north of the round tower, the palas also largely survived the devastating fire of 1540. In 1583 and 1585 it was replaced by Vogt Vogel by a three-story building, which largely corresponds to the today's northern palace wing. The area was surrounded by the economic structures – wash house, stables, gardens, chapel – and separated with a wall and a gate leading into the Oberstadt area. In 1883 a children's home has been set up in the former palas, and in 1890 the main building was widened and transformed into a school building which is now used by the Stiftung Schloss Regensberg foundation. In the west new buildings were erected, and the Unteres Haus building was converted into an accommodation building and a sheltered workshop. Prior the castle's gate and the stable barn were broken.

== History ==
Either Lütold V von Regensberg or his son Ulrich (+ 1280) has established the fortified town of (Neu)-Regensberg, but when Lütold V died about 1250, his two sons Lütold VI and Ulrich divided the inheritance. Ulrich secured among others the fortified town of Regensberg. During the mid-13th century, the relations between the House of Regensberg and the city of Zürich became strained, and Ulrich came in conflict with the House of Habsburg inheriting the lands of extinct House of Kyburg, and Ulrich lost the Regensberger Fehde war of 1267/68. Ulrich died around 1280, and his son Lütold VIII had also to sell Regensberg to Habsburg-Austria in 1302. The Habsburgs mortgaged the castle and town several times, and in 1407 the so-called Herrschaft Regensberg was acquired by the city of Zürich. From 1417 the castle became the seat of the bailiff of the bailiwick of Regensberg (Herrschaft Regensberg, later Äussere Vogtei) of Zürich. On 6 June 1443 the council of Zürich forced their troops and the citizens to defend the fortified town lib und leben (analogously: faithful unto death), three days later the castle was conquered during the Old Zürich War by Zürich's contrahents, but not destroyed, and some months later manned again by Zürich troops.

On 9 September 1540 the town, but not the castle, was destroyed by fire, because it was separated from the Oberstadt by a ditch. The upper castle (Oberstadt) was rebuilt in the following year. From 1689 the castle and the upper town were fortified according to then modern standards. On 13 March 1798 the French revolutionary troops forced the council of the city republic of Zürich to abdicate, and the country bailiwicks were dissolved. After the end of the short-lived Helvetic Republic, Regensberg became the district capital, and the castle was the seat of the cantonal authorities, and in the main building there was the county jail until 1863. In 1883 the charity Förder-Stiftung für Kinder und Jugendliche der Stiftung Schloss Regensberg was founded to establish the present special needs school for children.

== House of Regensberg ==
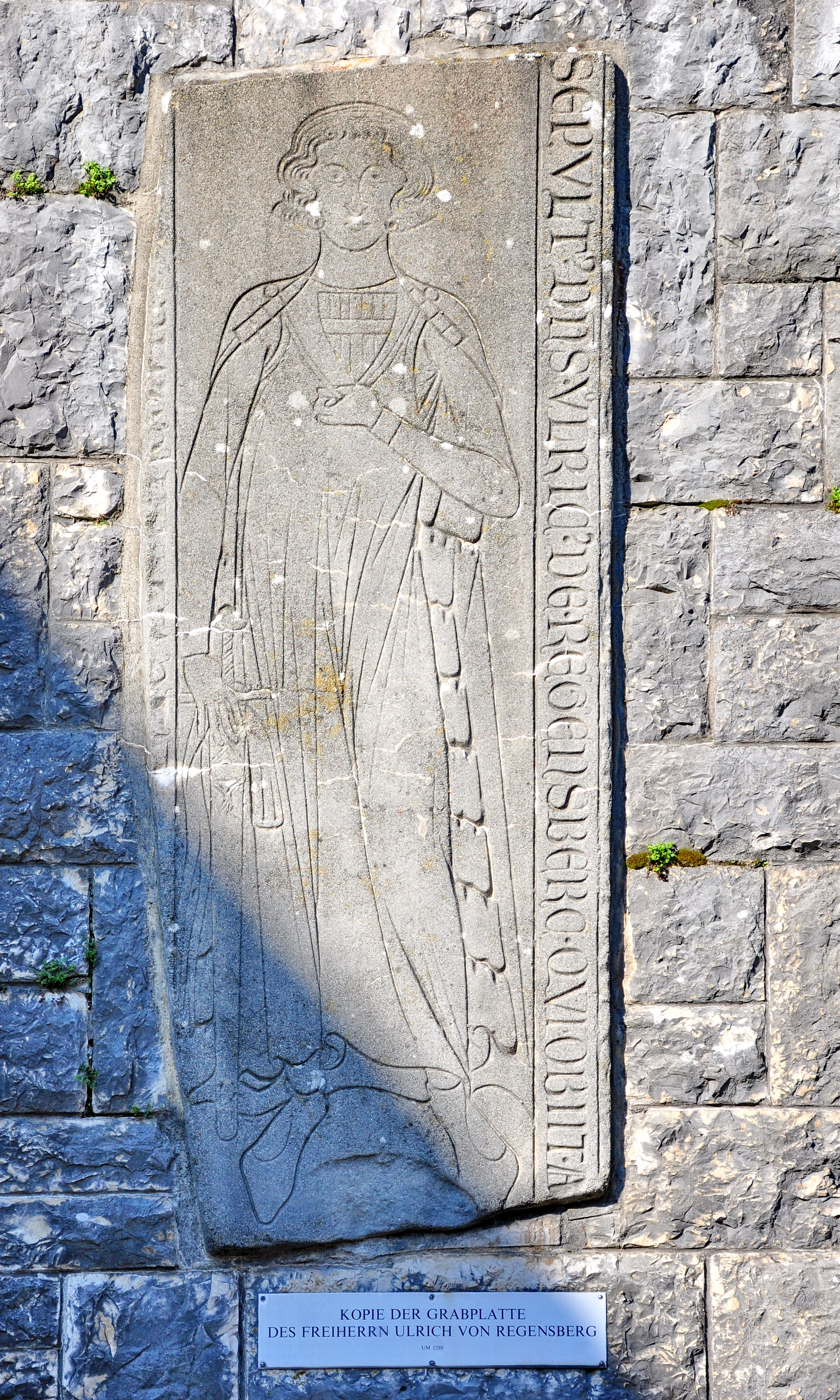
Replica of the gravestone of Ulrich I von Regensberg at the Regensberg Castle

The so-called Hunfried document of 1044 AD mentions among others a witness named Lütold of Affoltern who is suspected as the builder of the Alt-Regensberg Castle on the border between Regensdorf and Zürich-Affoltern around 1050 AD, and Lütold I von Regensberg was mentioned as the first holder of the family's name around 1088.

The heartland of the Regensberg possessions was in the Furt, Surb and Wehn valleys besides the Lägern chain. Other assets and rights were in the Limmat and Reppisch valleys, in Zürcher Oberland, in the Pfannenstiel area, also sporadically in the present Thurgau and north of the Rhein river and on Bodensee lake shore. The house's significant position founded on marriage relations with the noble houses of Kyburg, Rapperswil-Habsburg-Laufenburg, Neuchâtel and Pfirt.

Two monastic foundations date back to the House of Regensberg: Around 1130 Lütold II and his wife Judenta and his son Lütold III founded the Fahr Abbey, and with the foundation of Rüti Abbey in 1206 the family probably secured lands of the first extinction of the Alt-Rapperswil family around 1192.

Shortly after the founding of the town of Grüningen, Lütold VI established a private service nobility from the 1240s, and to the middle of the century, he founded the town of Neu-Regensberg and the new ancestral seat and the small town of Glanzenberg. After the construction of Neu-Regensberg an inheritance occurred in 1255: Lütold VI retained the ancestral castle and the extensive free float, his brother Ulrich received Neu-Regensberg and the possessions in the Limmattal. In 1267/68 the disputes about the Kyburg lands led to a war respectively feud (so-called Regensberger Fehde) between the Regensberg family and an alliance of the city of Zürich and Rudolf von Habsburg who later became king. The House of Regensberg lost this war, and rapidly declined in power over the following decades. The family became extinct in the male line in 1331.

== Cultural heritage ==
The castle, the tower and the fountain are listed in the Swiss inventory of cultural property of national and regional significance as a Class B object of regional importance.
