= Jona, Switzerland =

Former municipality of Switzerland in St. Gallen

Jona
- Former municipality
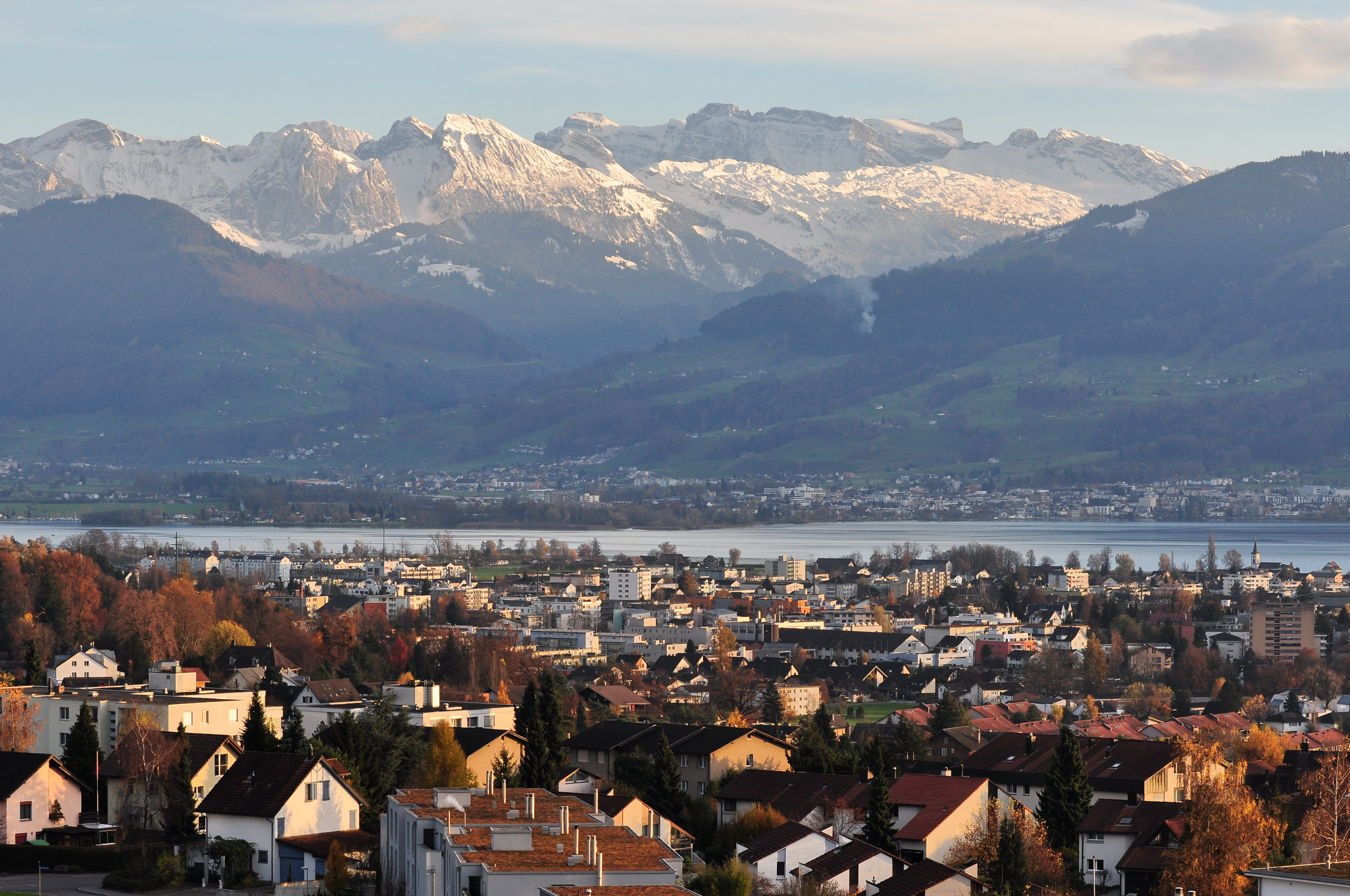
- Jona in November 2010, view on Obersee and Glärnisch

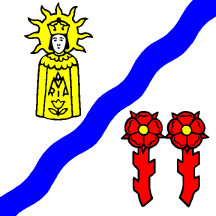
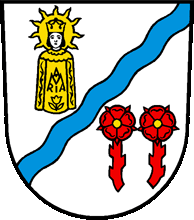
- Flag Coat of arms
- Location of Jona
- Location within Switzerland Location within Canton of St. Gallen
- Coordinates: 47°13′N 8°49′E
- Country: Switzerland
- Canton: St. Gallen
- District: See-Gaster
- Municipality: Rapperswil-Jona

Area
  - Total: 20.43 km^{2} (7.89 sq mi)
- Elevation: 409 m (1,342 ft)

Population (December 2006)
  - Total: 17,799
  - Density: 871.2/km^{2} (2,256/sq mi)
- Time zone: UTC+01:00 (CET)
  - Summer (DST): UTC+02:00 (CEST)
- Postal code: 8645
- SFOS number: 3335
- ISO 3166 code: CH-SG
- Localities: Bollingen, Busskirch, Curtiberg, Kempraten-Lenggis, Wagen
- Surrounded by: Altendorf (SZ), Bubikon (ZH), Eschenbach, Freienbach (SZ), Hombrechtikon (ZH), Kempraten, Lachen (SZ), Rapperswil, Rüti (ZH), Schmerikon, Tuggen (SZ), Wangen (SZ)
- Website: www.rapperswil-jona.ch

Jona (German pronunciation: [ˈjoːna]) is a former municipality and since January 2007 part of the municipality of Rapperswil-Jona in the Wahlkreis (constituency) of See-Gaster in the canton of St. Gallen in Switzerland. Before the merger with Rapperswil, the former municipality of Jona comprised the villages of Jona, Bollingen, Busskirch, Curtiberg, Kempraten-Lenggis, and Wagen.

== Geography ==
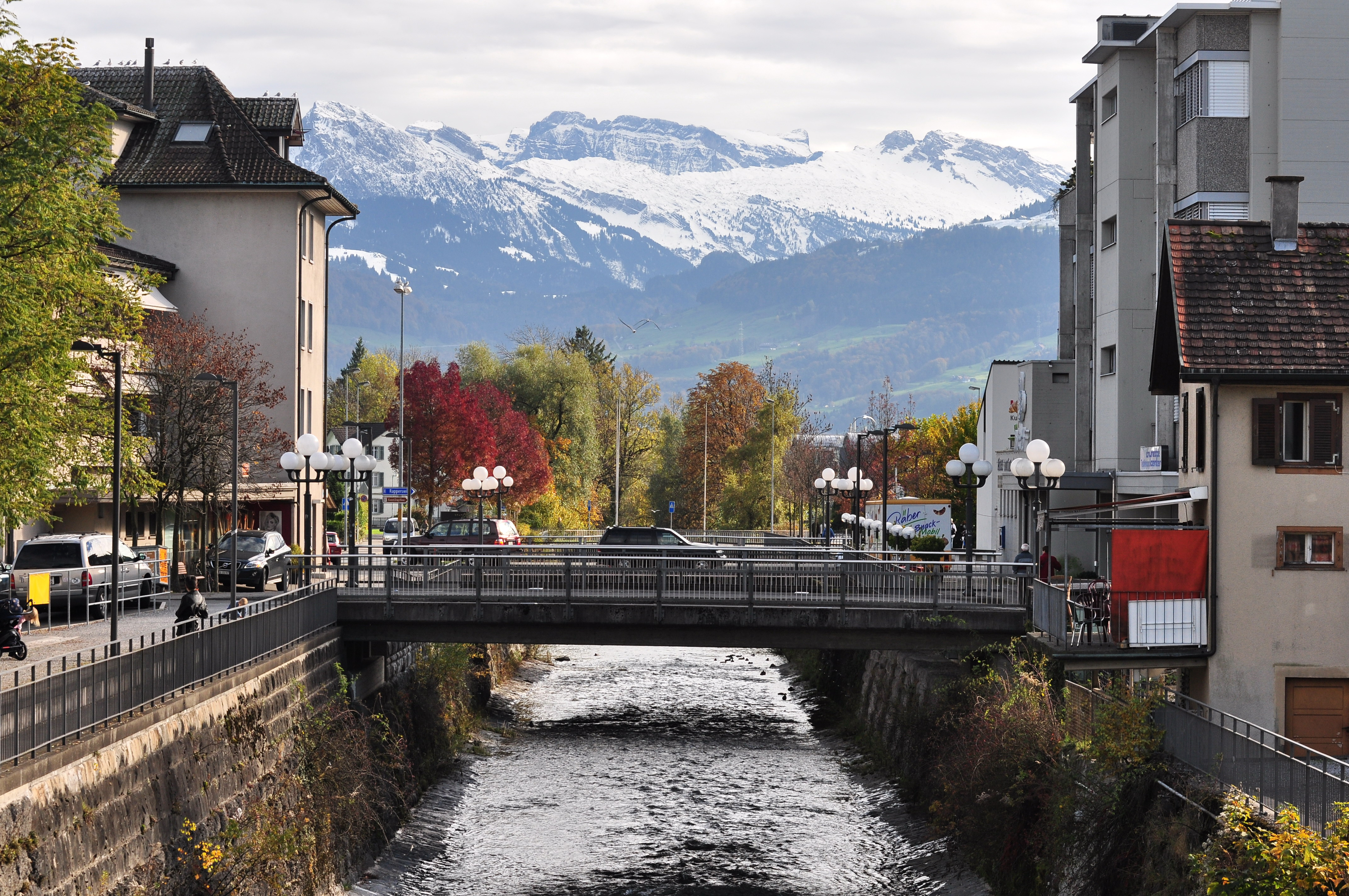
River Jona in the centre of former Jona village

Aerial view of Jona village in 1948

The former municipality of Jona extended from the eastern shore of the main part of Lake Zürich (Kempraten) to the northern shore of Obersee, the upper or eastern division of Lake Zurich (Bollingen, Busskirch). The former village of Jona is located on the River Jona, which flows into the Obersee.

== History ==
The River Jona flows through the former Jona municipality in the Obersee (upper Lake Zürich). The settlement is named after the river, first recorded in Latinized form Johanna in AD 834, as super Johannam fluvium. The Middle High German form Jonun is recorded 1243. The river name was likely adapted into Alemannic (Old High German) around the 8th century from a Gallo-Roman *Jauna as a weakly inflecting feminine *Jōna(n), yielding modern dialectal Jōne(n).

In 1350, Rapperswil and its castle was widely destroyed by Rudolf Brun, and the Herrschaft Rapperswil – Rapperswil and some surrounding villages including Jona – was acquired by the Habsburg family.

After 1803's Act of Mediation, Rapperswil and Jona joined the canton of St. Gallen, and the former Herrschaft Rapperswil was split into the municipalities Rapperswil and Jona. Jona, as municipality, was established in 1803 around the former boundaries of the city of Rapperswil, comprising the small rest of the former Herrschaft Rapperswil and the villages of Bollingen, Busskirch, Curtiberg, Kempraten-Lenggis, Wagen and Wurmsbach.

In the early 19th century, Jona river's hydropower was used for a larger number of watermills along the small river. As a renewable source, the river was important for industrialization of the rapidly growing village.

On January 1, 2007, the municipalities of Rapperswil and Jona merged to form a new political entity: Rapperswil-Jona has a population of 25,777 (as of December 2007). This makes it the second largest town in the canton after the capital St. Gallen itself.

== Transport ==
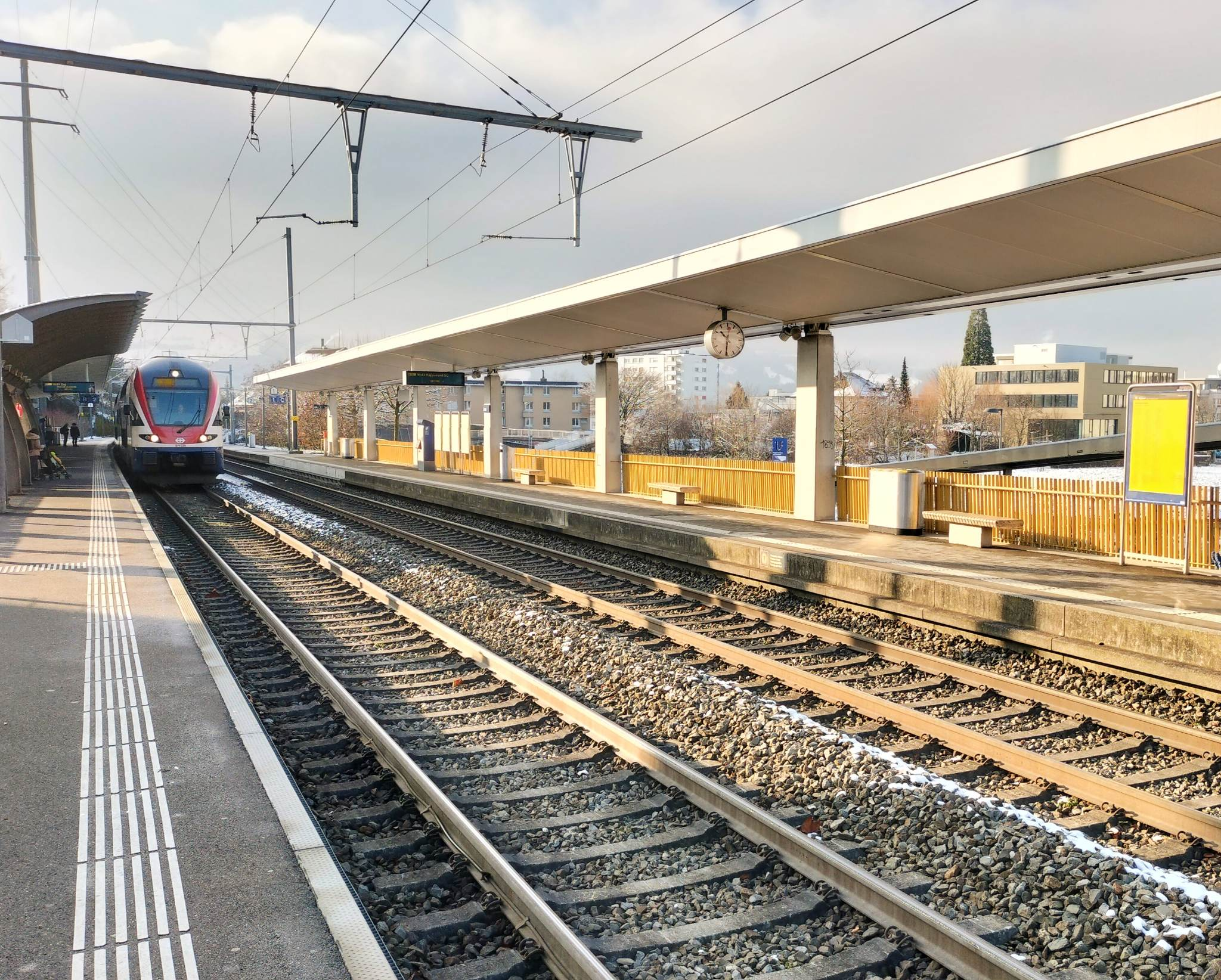
Jona railway station

The town's bus service, Stadtbus Rapperswil-Jona, is provided by the Verkehrsbetriebe Zürichsee und Oberland (VZO) since 2008. In addition, Schneider Busbetriebe operates line 622 to Wagen (continues to St. Gallenkappel/Wattwil) and line 621 to Buech/St. Dyonis.

The main railway station of the former Jona municipality is Jona, which is served by S-Bahn trains of the Zurich S-Bahn (lines S5 and S15, combined quarter-hourly service between Rapperswil and Zürich HB). Jona railway station and adjacent bus station were renovated between 2013 and 2015.

Two other railway stations in the former Jona municipality, Blumenau and Kempraten, are served by the S6 / S17 of St. Gallen S-Bahn (combined half-hourly service to Schwanden/Linthal and Sargans) and the S7 of Zurich S-Bahn (half-hourly service to Meilen, Zürich HB and Winterthur), respectively. Another railway station, Bollingen, is disused since 2004. The largest railway station of the Rapperswil-Jona municipality is Rapperswil.

== Notable people ==
- Alberich Zwyssig (1808-1854) a Cistercian monk who composed the Swiss Psalm, the present Swiss national anthem.
- Carl Gustav Jung (1875-1961) a psychiatrist and psychoanalyst who founded analytical psychology.
- Wangpo Tethong (born 1963), Swiss-Tibetan activist, writer, spokesperson of Greenpeace Switzerland and member of the 15th Tibetan Parliament in Exile.
- Roger Federer (born 1981), Swiss former professional tennis player, is moving to Kempraten (former Jona municipality).

== Gallery and maps ==
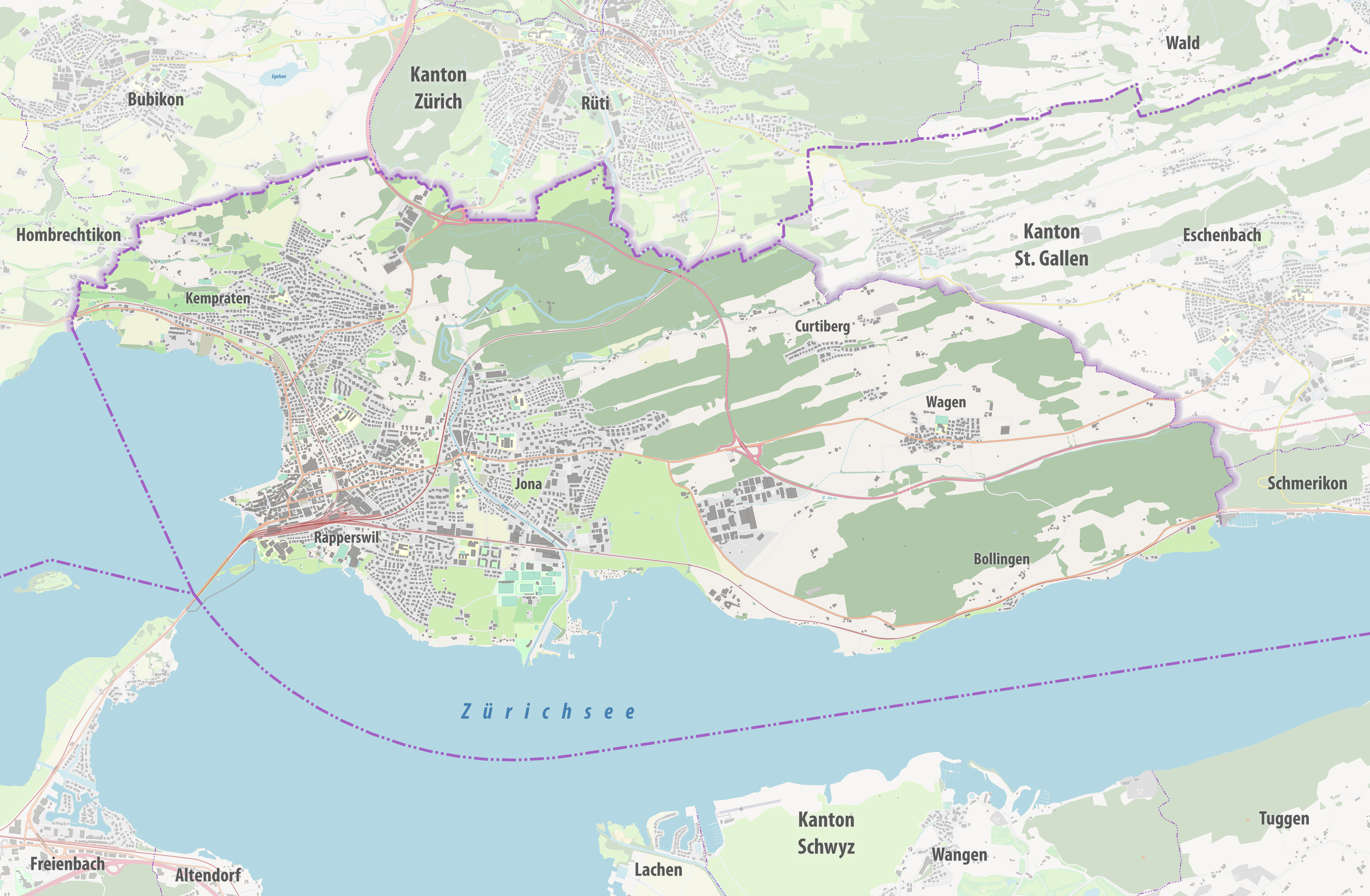
Map of Rapperswil-Jona municipality (2021)

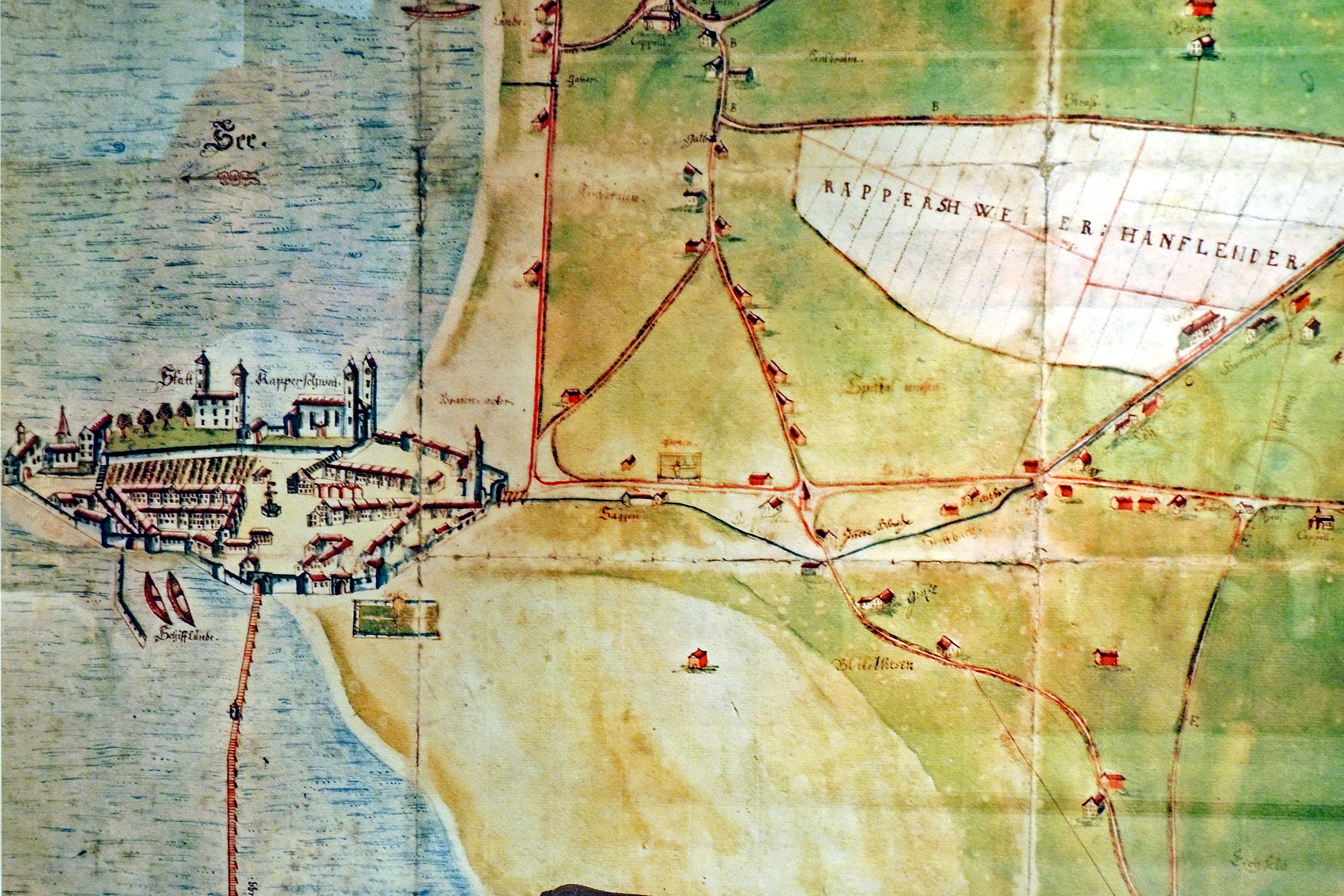
Rapperswil (left) and Jona village (right) in 1804

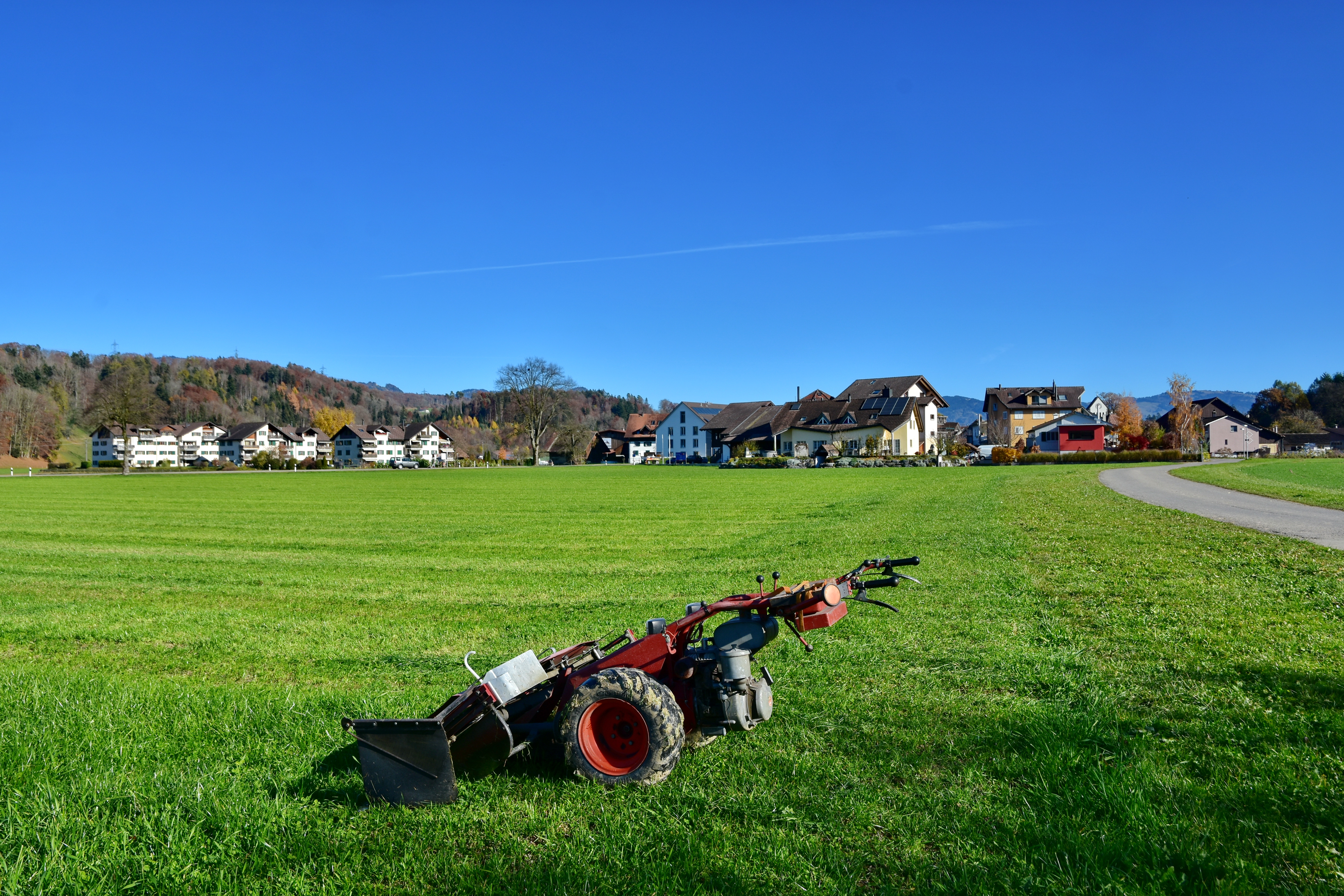
Wagen village

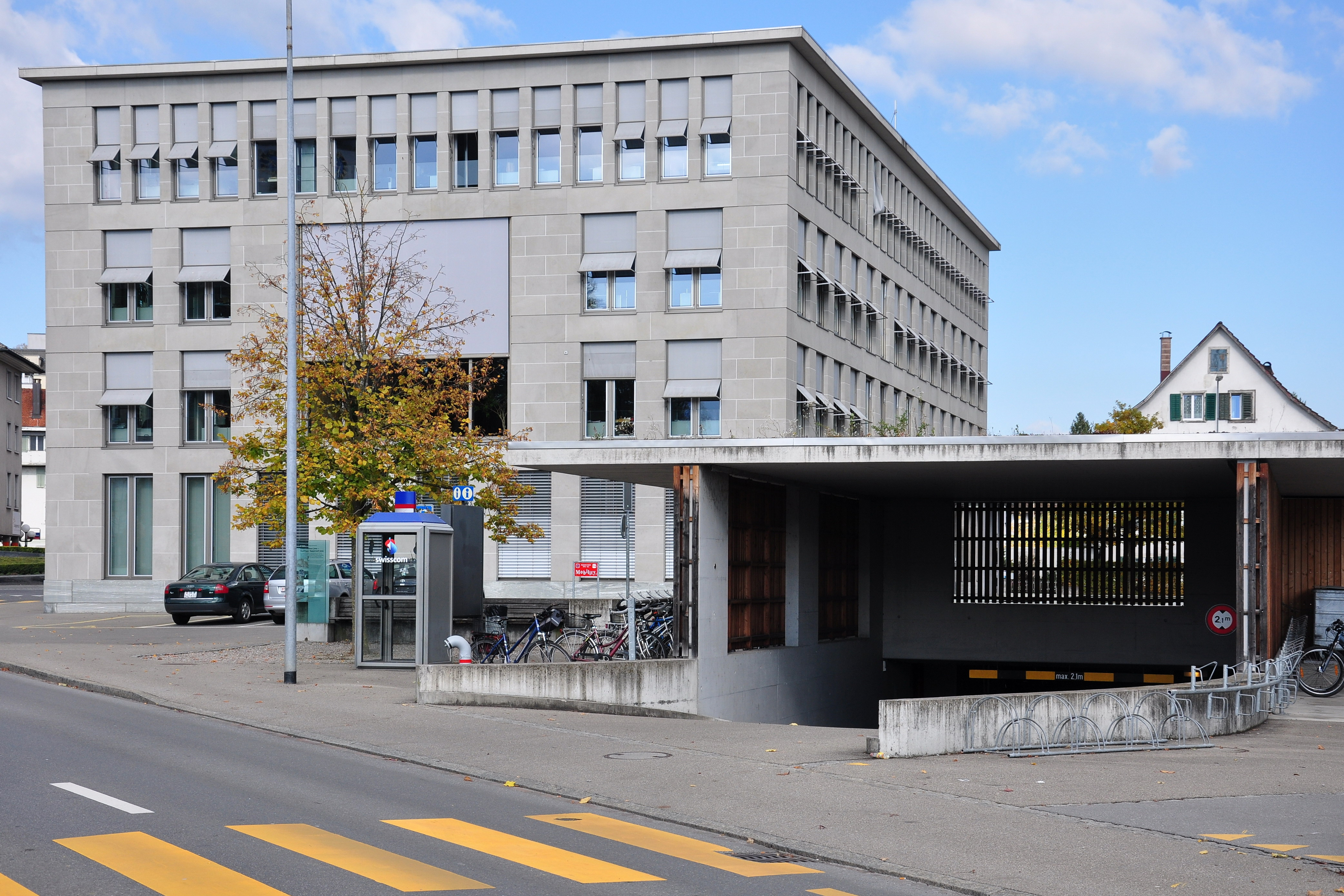
Stadthaus (city hall)

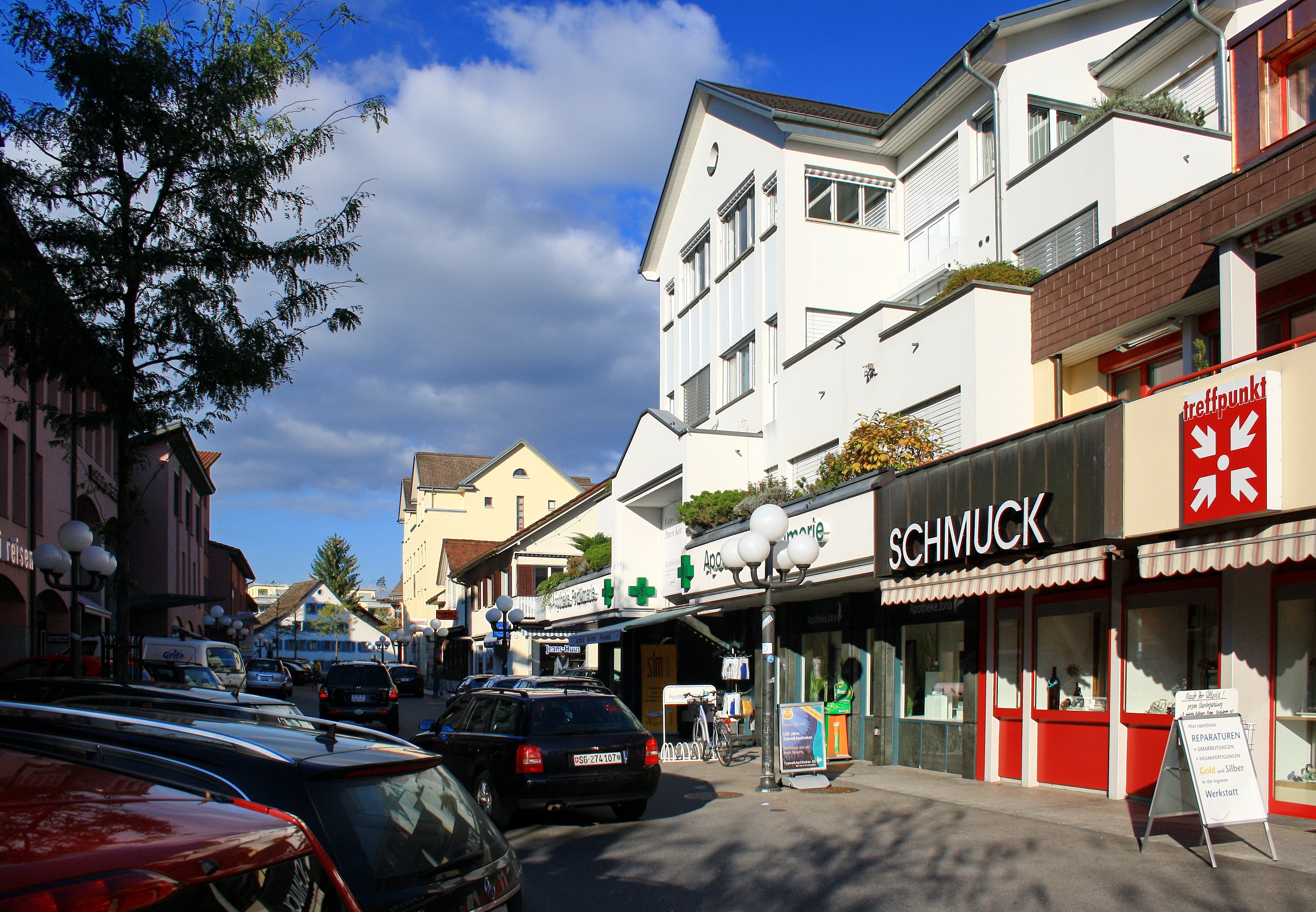
Molkereistrasse with shops

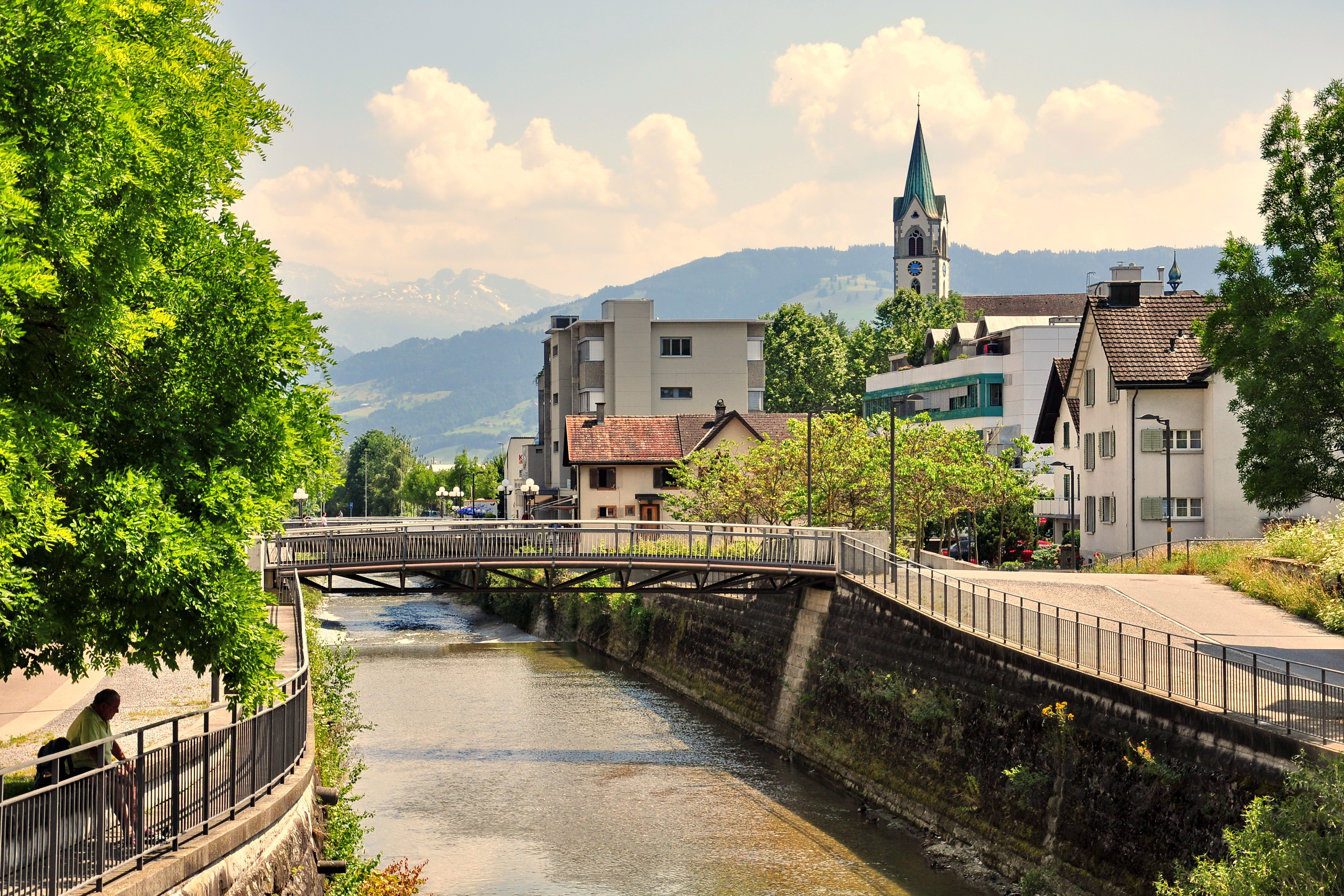
River Jona and Mariae Himmelfahrt church

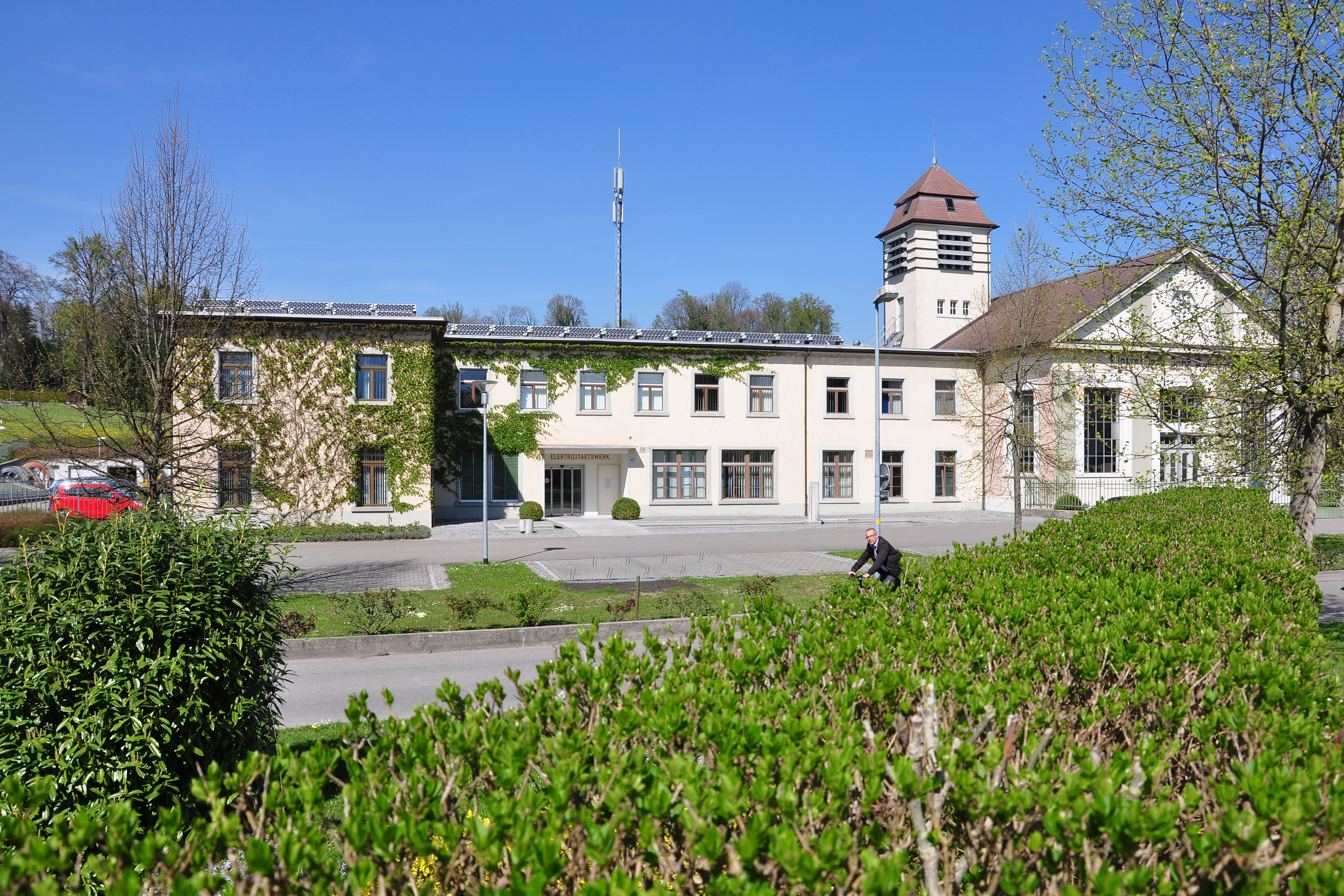
Elektrizitätswerk Jona-Rapperswil, EWJR (electric power station)

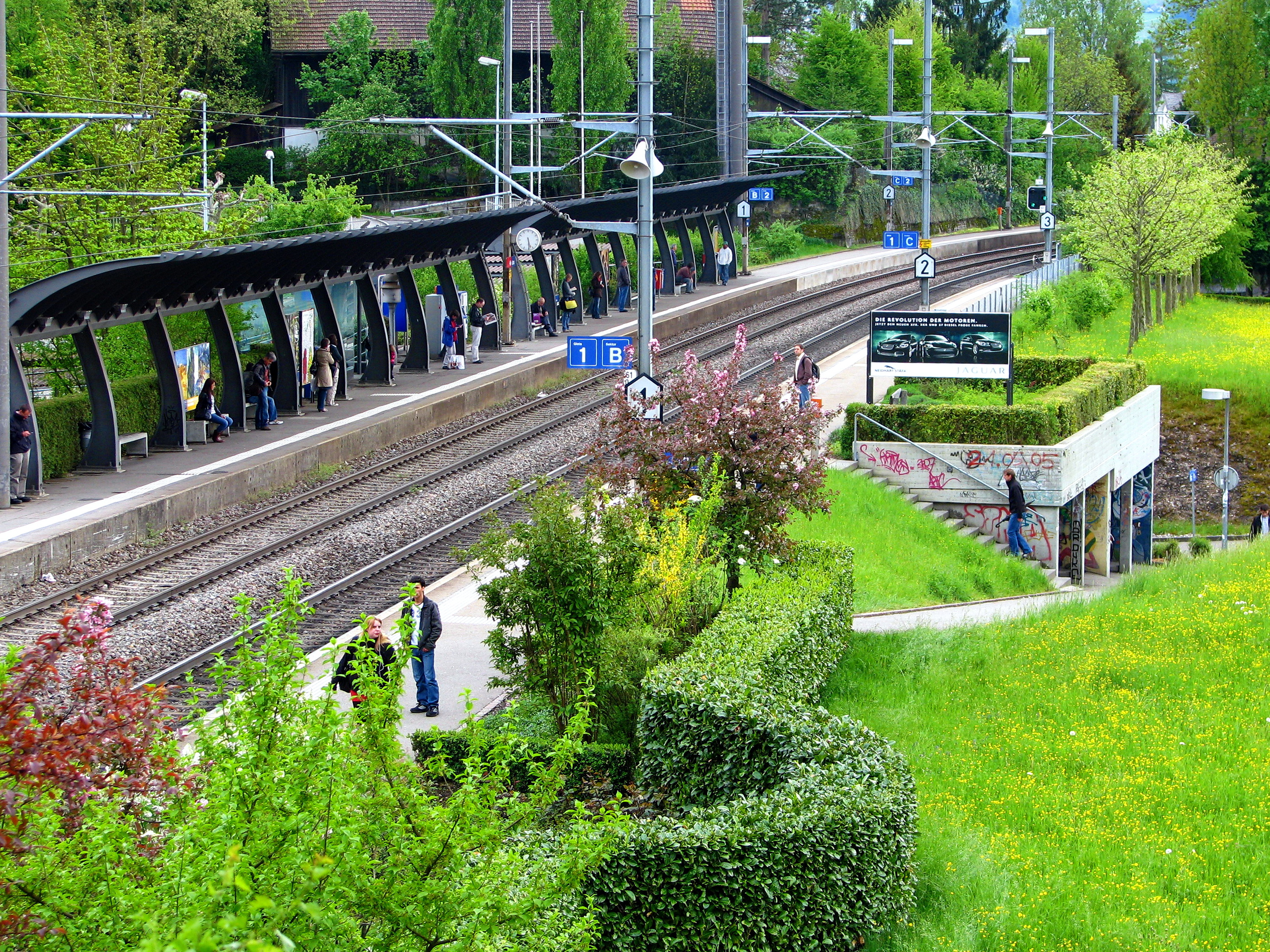
Former Jona railway station on the S-Bahn Zürich lines S5 and S15

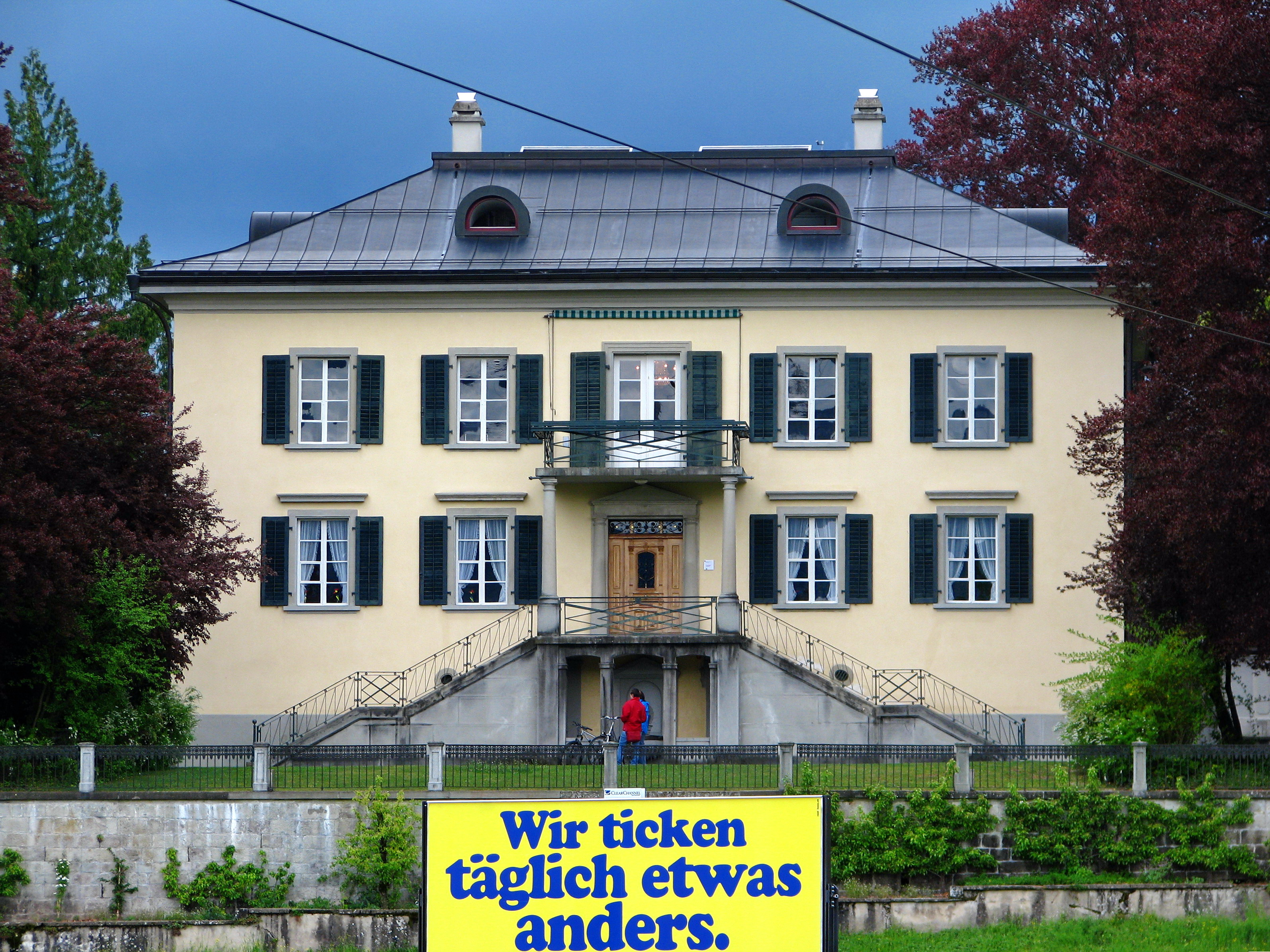
Grünfels estate next to Jona railway station

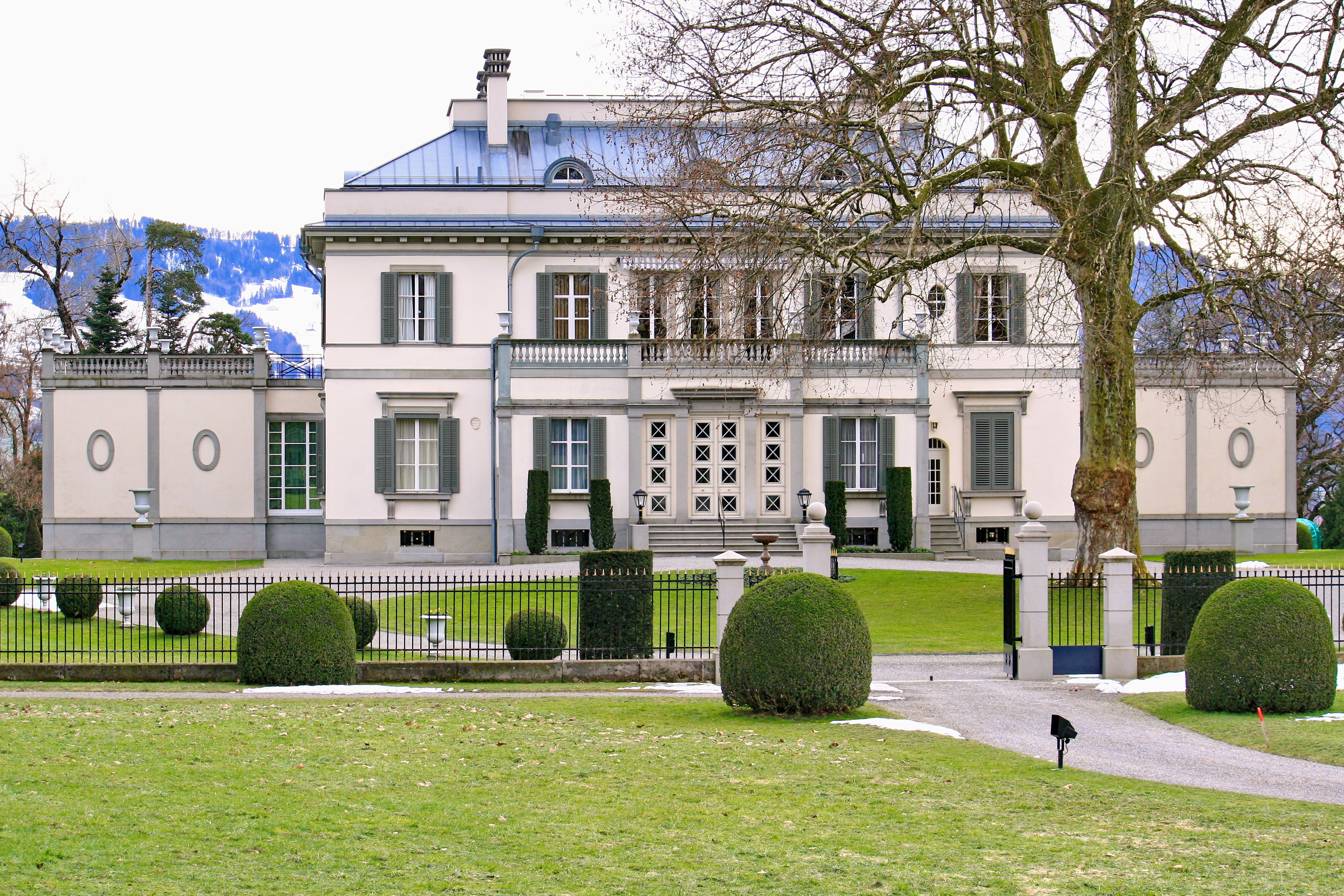
Meienberg Castle

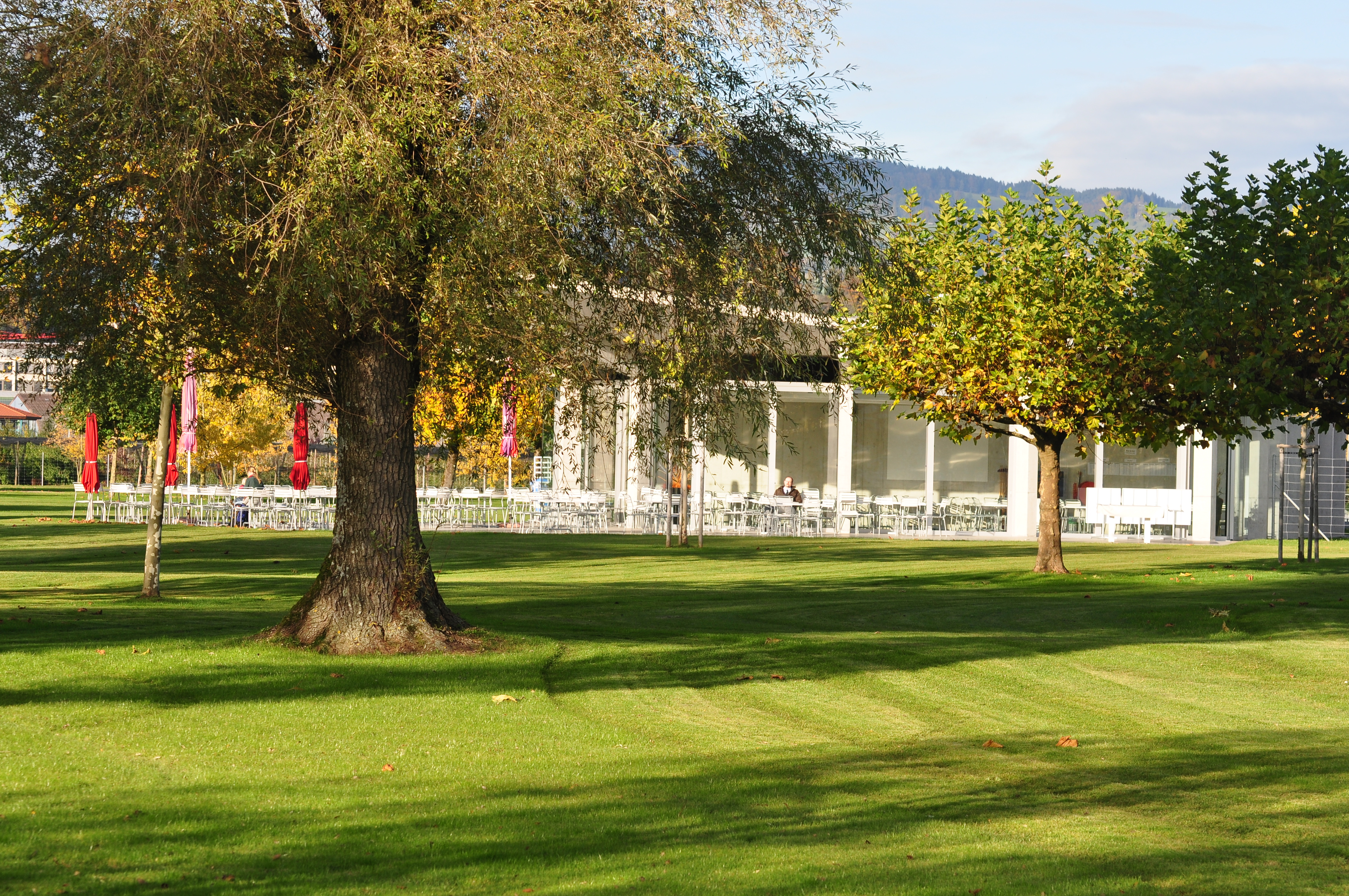
Stampf lido next to the River Jona delta and Obersee (upper Lake Zürich), respectively

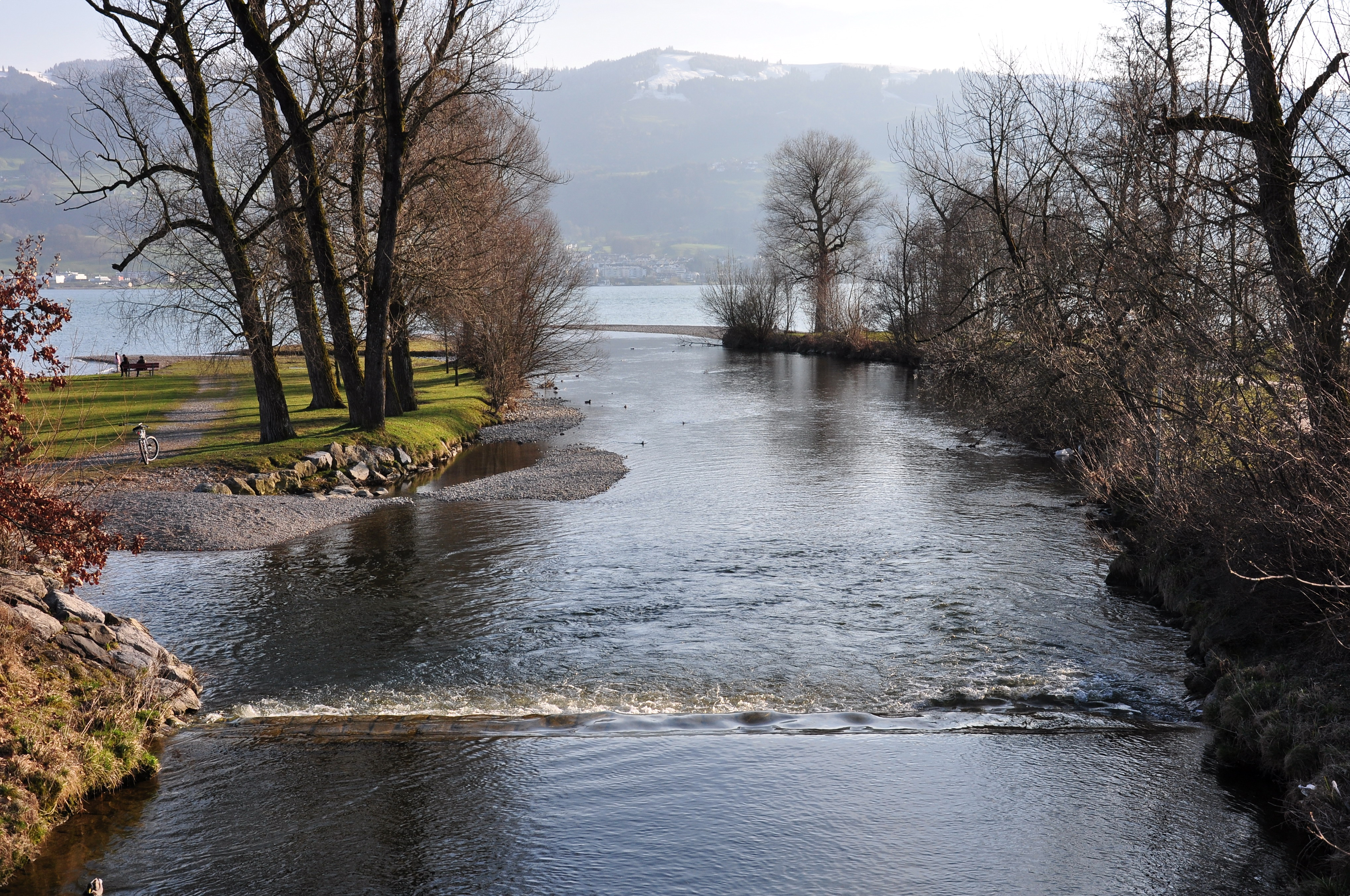
Delta of River Jona (Stampf)

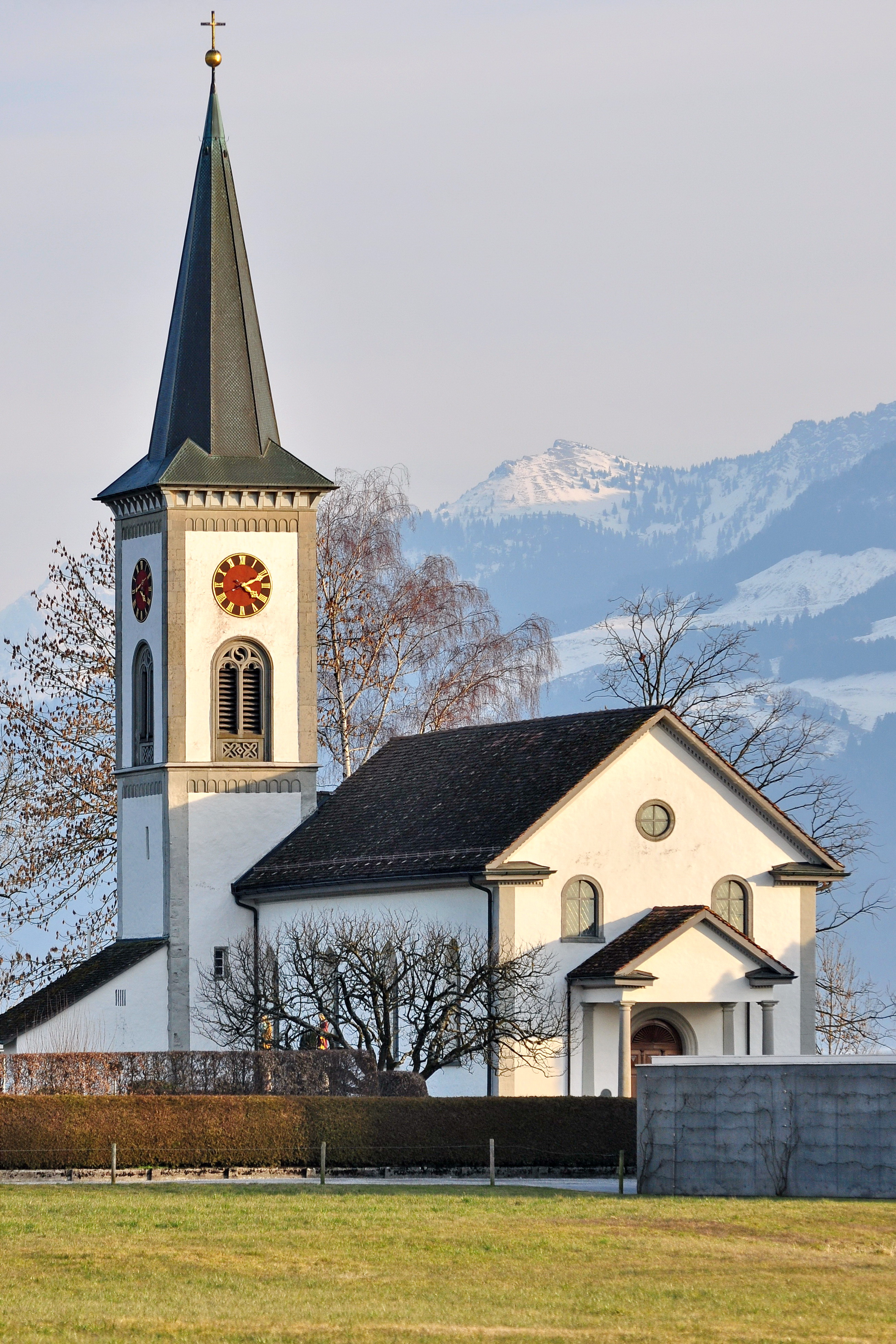
St. Martin Busskirch

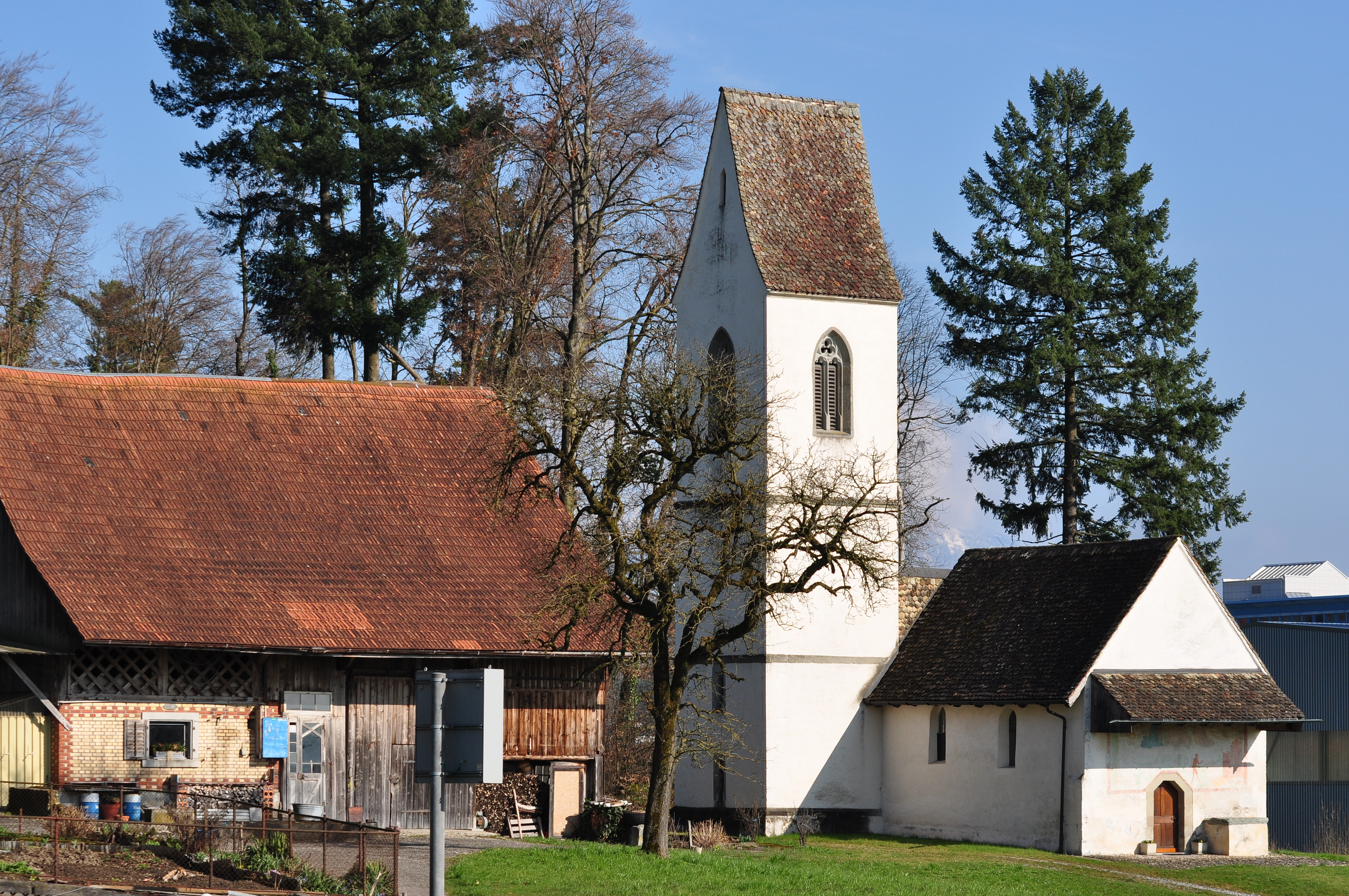
Buech, St. Dionys church

== Literature ==
- Eugen Halter: Geschichte der Gemeinde Jona. Politische Gemeinde Jona, Schweizer Verlagshaus, Zürich 1970.
