= Bollingen =

Village in Switzerland

Bollingen (German pronunciation: [ˈbɔlɪŋən]) is a village (Kirchdorf) within the municipality of Rapperswil-Jona in the Swiss canton of St. Gallen.

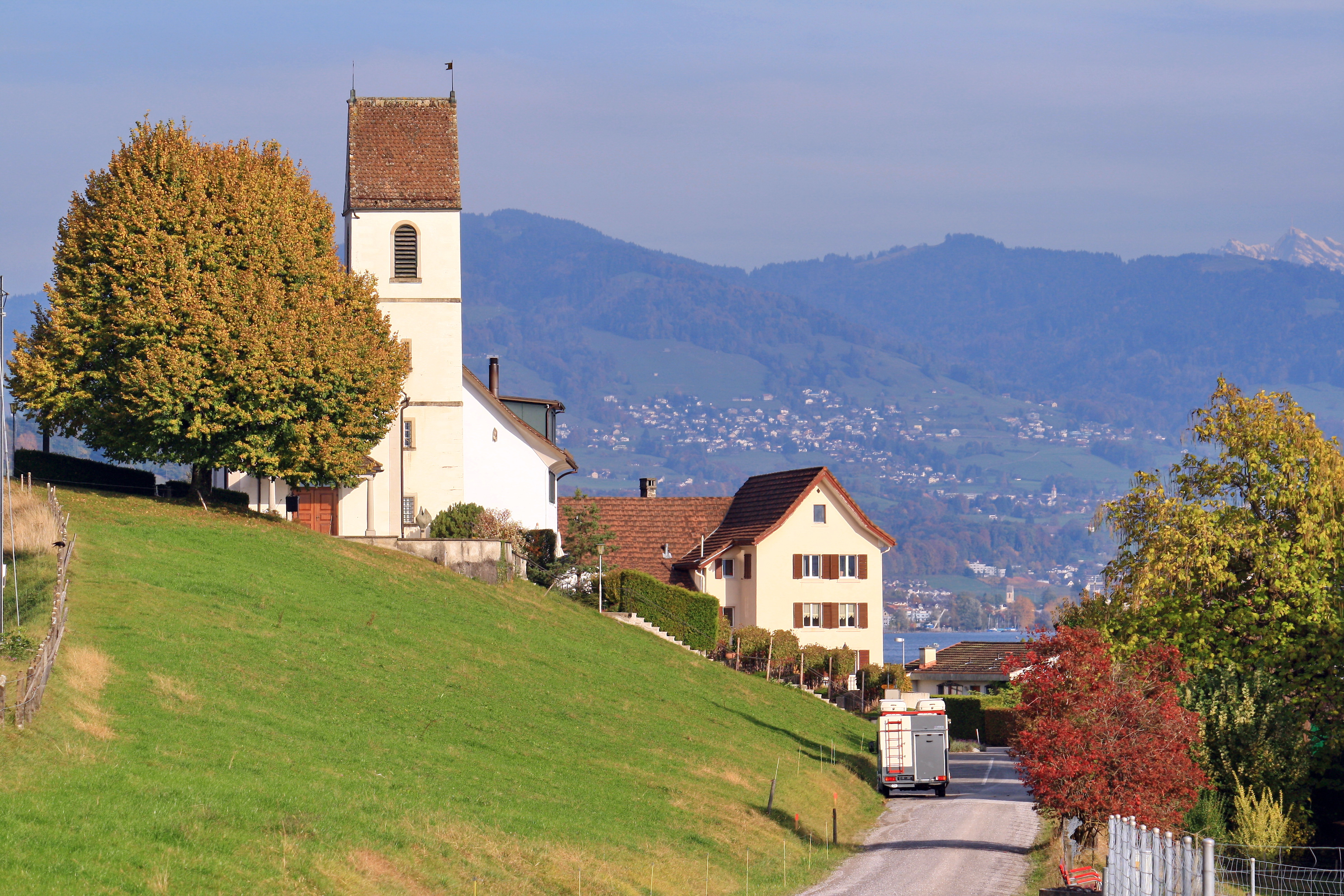
Bollingen, Schmerikon and Uznach in the background

Aerial view from 400 m by Walter Mittelholzer (1919)

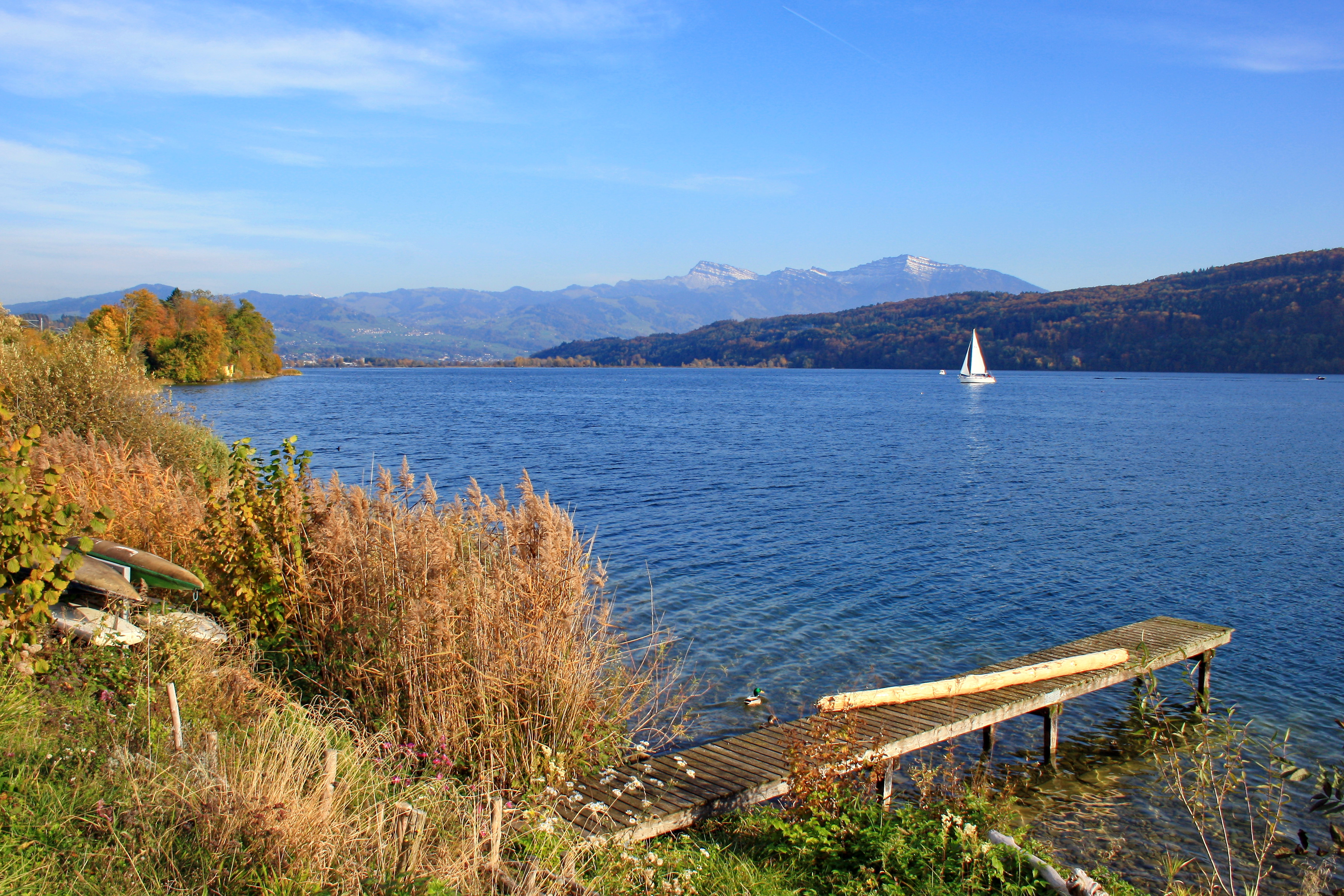
Obersee (upper Lake Zürich) at Bollingen, Benken in the background

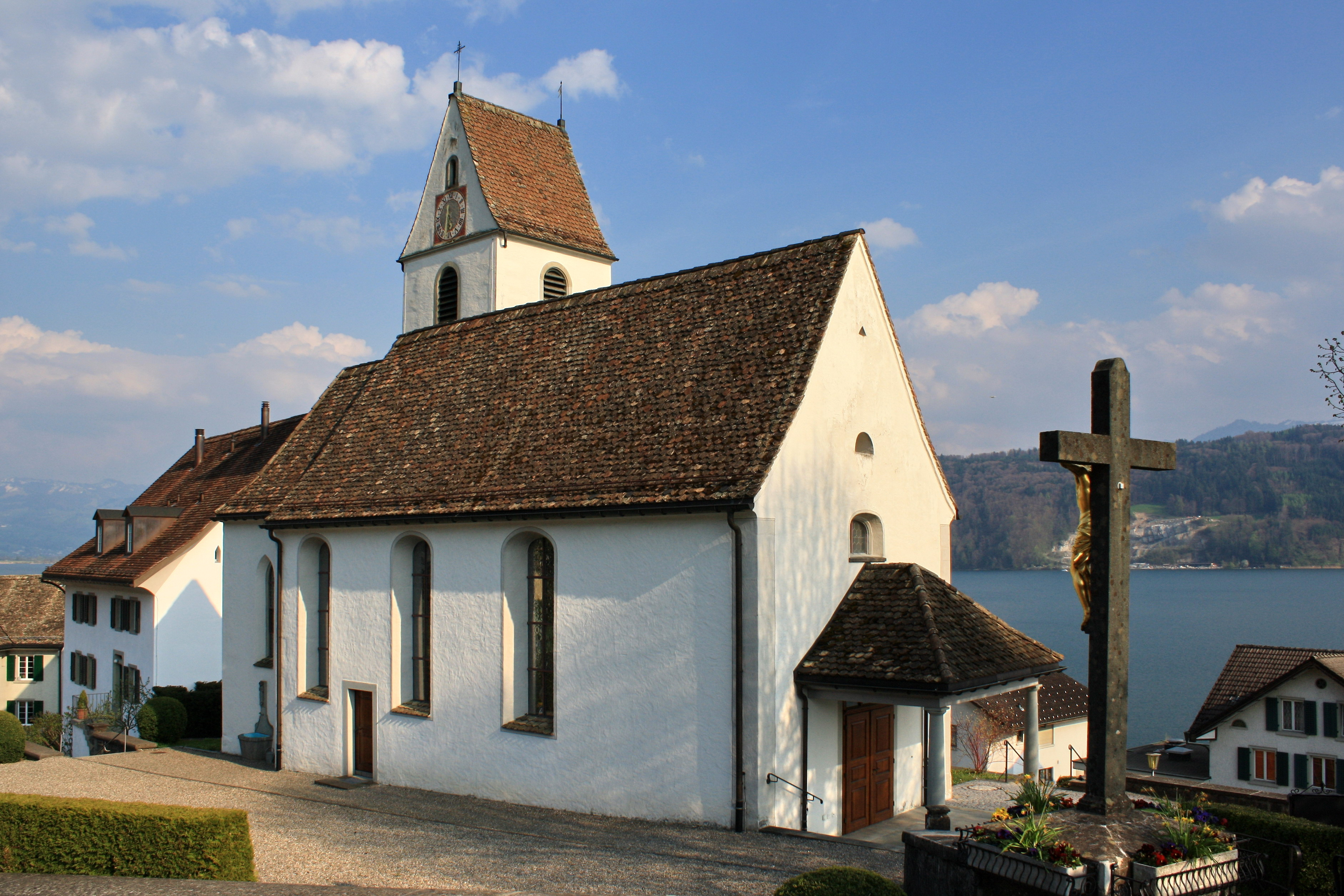
St. Pankratius church in Unterbollingen

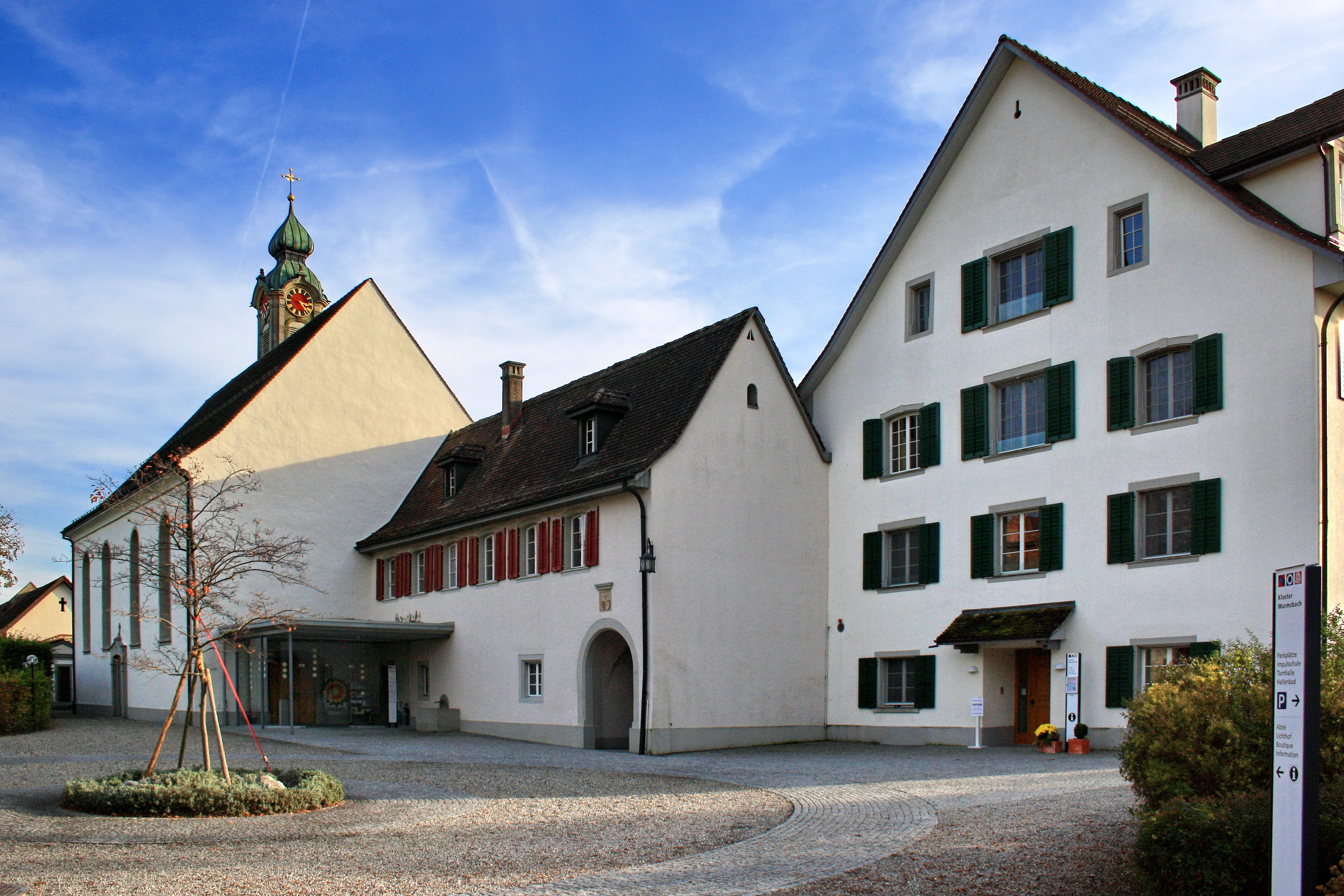
Mariazell Wurmsbach Abbey

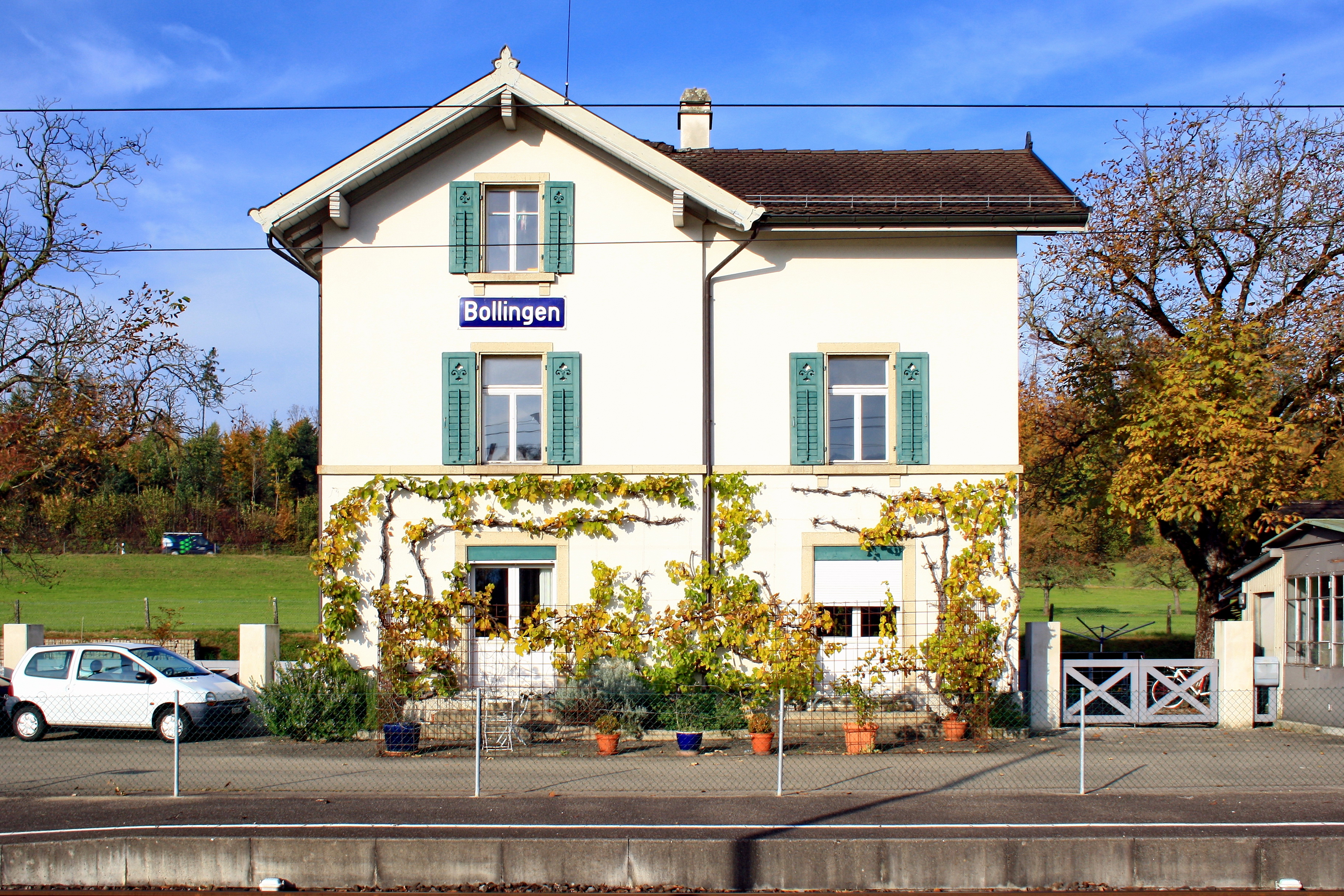
Former train station. The platform has since been removed.

== Geography ==
The village is located along the northern shore of the upper Lake Zürich (Obersee) between Jona and Schmerikon. Bollingen was part of the former municipality of Jona: On 1 January 2007 the former municipalities of Rapperswil and Jona merged to form the new political entity Rapperswil-Jona.

== History ==
Sandstone from Bollingen may have been used even in the Roman Empire era, but presumably Bollinger Sandstein is extracted and processed since 1000 AD. Among others it was used for the Grossmünster and Fraumünster churches in Zürich, as well as for the Einsiedeln and St. Gallen abbeys, or the Zunfthaus zur Meisen that was built in 1757 at the Münsterhof plaza in Zürich.

In the European Middle Ages, the two settlements named Unterbollingen and Oberbollingen are mentioned as part of the later Herrschaft Rapperswil of the Counts of Rapperswil. The earliest document sealed at the Rapperswil Castle was related to the donation of the church of Unterbollingen to the Rüti Abbey, and also mentions among others a civitas of the town of Rapperswil as witnesses of Count Rudolf von Rapperswil in 1229. On the peninsula at Oberbollingen, a St. Nicholas Chapel is mentioned, where around 1229 a small Cistercian nunnery, later Premonstratensian convent associated with the Rüti Abbey was established by the Counts of Rapperswil; in 1267 it was united with the nearby Mariazell Wurmsbach Abbey. In 1519 a new church in honor of St. Pancras was inaugurated in Unterbollingen. After the Reformation in Zürich the church was acquired by the city of Rapperswil to be united with the Heiliggeistspital, but since 1871 it is a parish church for its own.

== Points of interest ==
Bollingen is known for the "Tower" built there by Carl Gustav Jung. Another remarkable site is the nearby Wurmsbach Abbey.

== Transportation ==
Bollingen was a railway station located about halfway between Bollingen village and the Wurmsbach Abbey, which closed in 2004 for economic reasons. It is located on the Rapperswil–Ziegelbrücke railway line in between Blumenau and Schmerikon stations. The railway building remained, but the platforms have been removed.

Since railway services were suspended, public transport was reduced to a bus service. Until December 2023, bus line 621 operated between Rapperswil and Buech/St. Dyonis (closest bus stop is Buechstr. West, a ca. 30 minute walk away from Bollingen village). Line 621 was subsumed into line 995, operated by Schneider Busbetriebe. The route was shortened and the western terminus became Jona. As of December 2023, the bus route is as follows:

Line	Route	Operator
995	Jona railway station – Jona Center – Hummelberg/Jona, Buechstrasse Ost	Schneider Busbetriebe

== Literature ==
- Eugen Halter: Geschichte der Gemeinde Jona. Schweizer Verlagshaus, Zürich 1970.
