= Jona railway station =

Railway station in Rapperswil-Jona, Switzerland

Jona
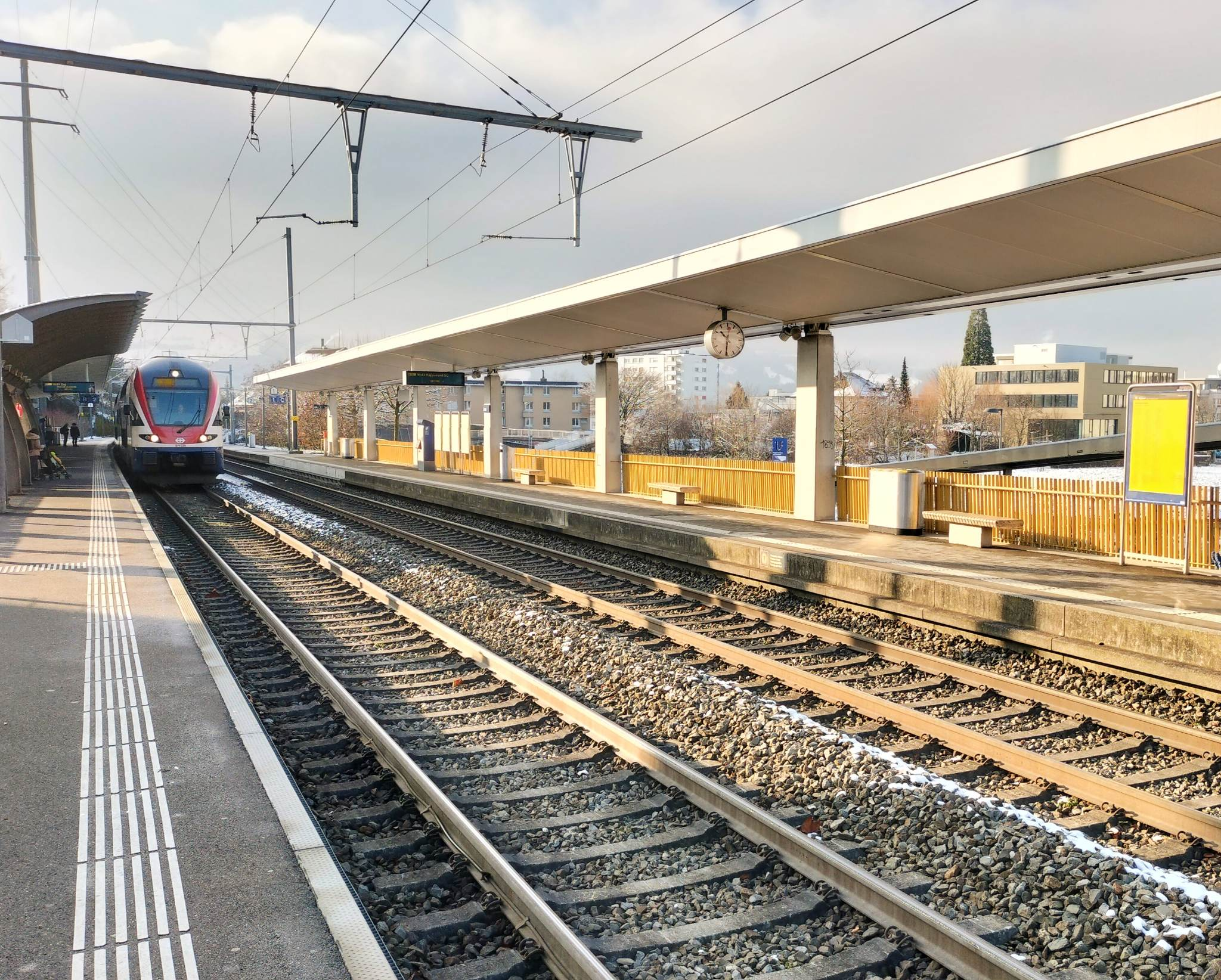
- S5 S-Bahn service arriving at the remodelled Jona station

General information
- Location: Bühlstrasse 17; Jona, Rapperswil-Jona, Canton of St. Gallen; Switzerland
- Coordinates: 47.229885°N 8.834215°E
- Elevation: 433 m (1,421 ft)
- Owner: Swiss Federal Railways
- Line: Wallisellen–Uster–Rapperswil line
- Platforms: 2 side platforms
- Tracks: 2
- Connections
- Bus: Schneider 622 995; VZO 991 992 993 994 996

Construction
- Parking: underground
- Cycle facilities: attended and unatended parking available, with roof
- Accessible: yes

Other information
- Fare zone: 180 (ZVV); 996 (Tarifverbund Ostwind)

History
- Opened: 1979
- Rebuilt: 2013–2015

Passengers
- 2018: 5200 per weekday

Services
Preceding station	Zurich S-Bahn	Following station
Rüti ZH towards Zug	S5	Rapperswil towards Pfäffikon SZ
Rüti ZH towards Niederweningen	S15	Rapperswil Terminus
Rüti ZH towards Knonau	SN5 Limited service	Rapperswil towards Pfäffikon SZ
Location
- Location within Switzerland Location within Canton of St. Gallen

Jona railway station is a railway station in Switzerland, situated next to the village of Jona (canton of St. Gallen). It is one of four active railway stations in the municipality of Rapperswil-Jona (the other three being Rapperswil, Kempraten and Blumenau). The station is located on the Wallisellen to Uster and Rapperswil railway line, within both fare zone 180 of the Zürcher Verkehrsverbund (ZVV) and fare zone 996 of the Ostwind Fare Network.

Jona railway station and adjacent bus station were remodelled between 2013 and 2015. In 2021, it was awarded the Swiss mobility price (FLUX).

== Service ==
=== Train ===
The station is only called at by S-Bahn-style services of the Zurich S-Bahn network. Lines S5 and S15 provide half-hourly connections to both Rapperswil and Zürich HB (combined quarter-hourly service in both directions). During weekends, there is also a nighttime S-Bahn service (SN5) offered by ZVV. Summary of S-Bahn services:

- Zurich S-Bahn:
  - S5: half-hourly service to Zug via Zürich HB, and to Pfäffikon SZ via Rapperswil.
  - S15: half-hourly service to Niederweningen via Zürich HB, and to Rapperswil.
  - Nighttime S-Bahn (only during weekends):
    - SN5: hourly service between Knonau and Pfäffikon SZ (via Zürich HB).

=== Bus ===
As of the December 2023 timetable change, there are seven bus routes to/from Jona railway station. The services are provided by Stadtbus Rapperswil-Jona, which is operated by the Verkehrsbetriebe Zürichsee und Oberland (VZO), and by Schneider Busbetriebe. While lines 991, 992, 994 and 995 (and 996 during peak.hours) all depart from the forecourt of the station, line 622 departs from Kreuz, and line 993 from Vogelau (both of these bus stops are within walking distance). The bus lines are as follows:

Line	Route	Operator
622	Rapperswil Bahnhof – Cityplatz – Sonnenhof – Kreuz – Jona Center – St. Dyonis – Wagen – Eschenbach – St. Gallenkappel (– Ricken – Wattwil)	Schneider
991	Rapperswil Bahnhof Süd – Kinderzoo – Grünfeld – Geberit (Blumenau railway station) – Jona railway station	Stadtbus Rapperswil-Jona (VZO)
992	Sonnenhof – Glärnischstrasse – Grünfeld – Geberit (Blumenau railway station) – Feldlistrasse – Jona railway station	Stadtbus Rapperswil-Jona (VZO)
993	Rapperswil Bahnhof – Cityplatz – Sonnenhof – Altersheim Meienberg – Vogelau – Tägernau	Stadtbus Rapperswil-Jona (VZO)
994	Rapperswil Bahnhof – Cityplatz – Sonnenhof – Kempraten, Bahnhof – Wohnheim Balm – Schönau – Jona railway station	Stadtbus Rapperswil-Jona (VZO)
995	Jona railway station – Jona Center – Hummelberg/Jona, Buechstrasse Ost	Schneider
996	Rapperswil Bahnhof Süd – Kinderzoo – Grünfeld – Geberit (Blumenau railway station) – Schachen/Feldlistrasse – Jona railway station	Stadtbus Rapperswil-Jona (VZO)

==== History ====
Until the timetable change on 10 December 2023, bus line 621 (operated by Schneider) operated between Rapperswil railway station and Jona, Buechstrasse Ost via Jona railway station. This line stopped operations due to the increase in frequency of line 622, which mostly uses the same route. Line 995 operated between Rapperswil railway station and Hummelberg, but was truncated in December 2023 for the same reason. Line 995 now also serves the leg from Jona Center to Jona, Buechstrasse Ost, replacing line 621.

== Gallery ==
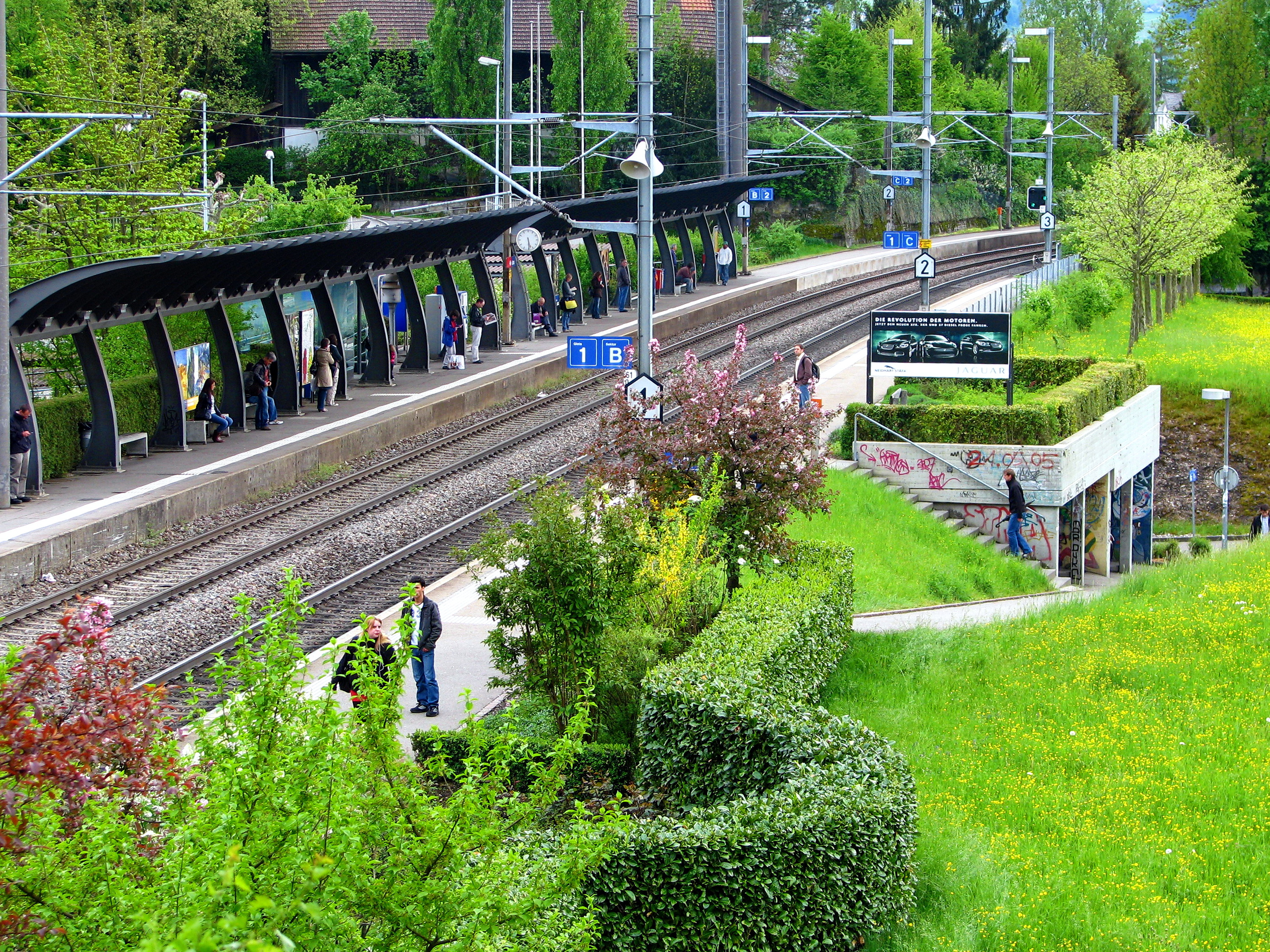
Jona railway station (looking south) before its remodelling

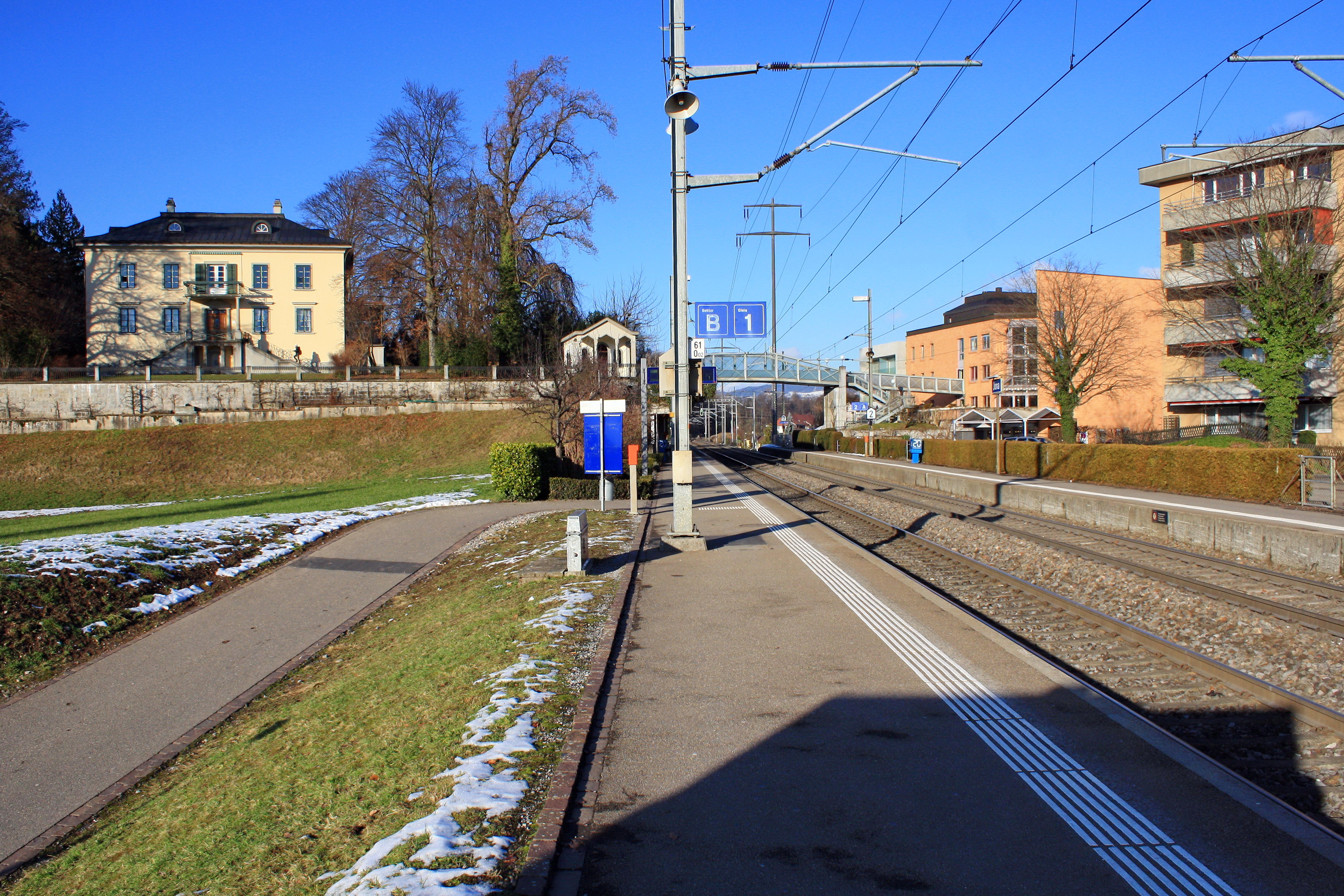
Villa Grünfels next to Jona railway station (before its remodelling)

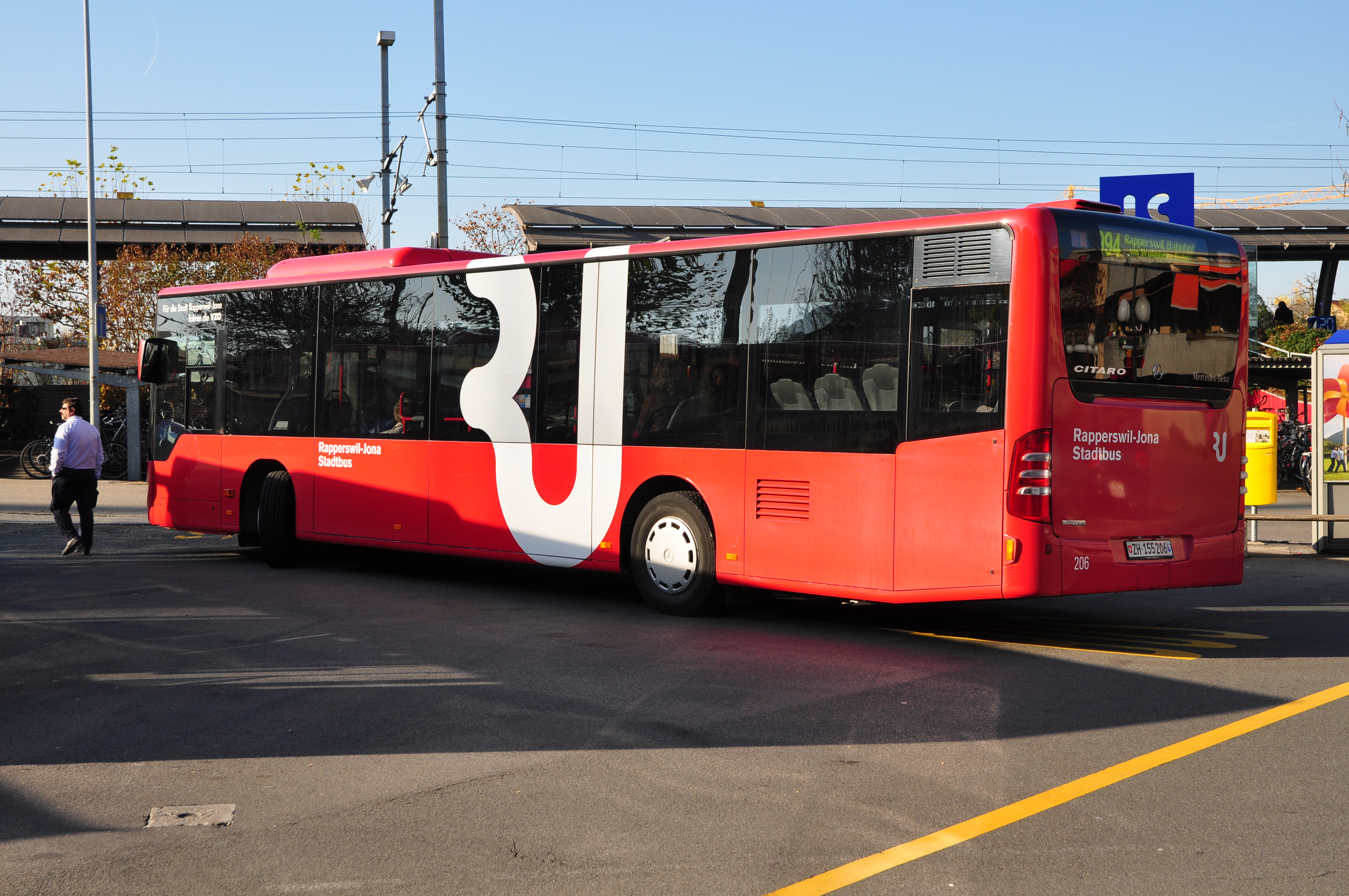
Bus of Stadtbus Rapperswil-Jona waiting at the Jona station (before its remodelling)

== See also ==
- Rail transport in Switzerland
