= Kempraten railway station =

Railway station in Rapperswil-Jona, Switzerland

Kempraten
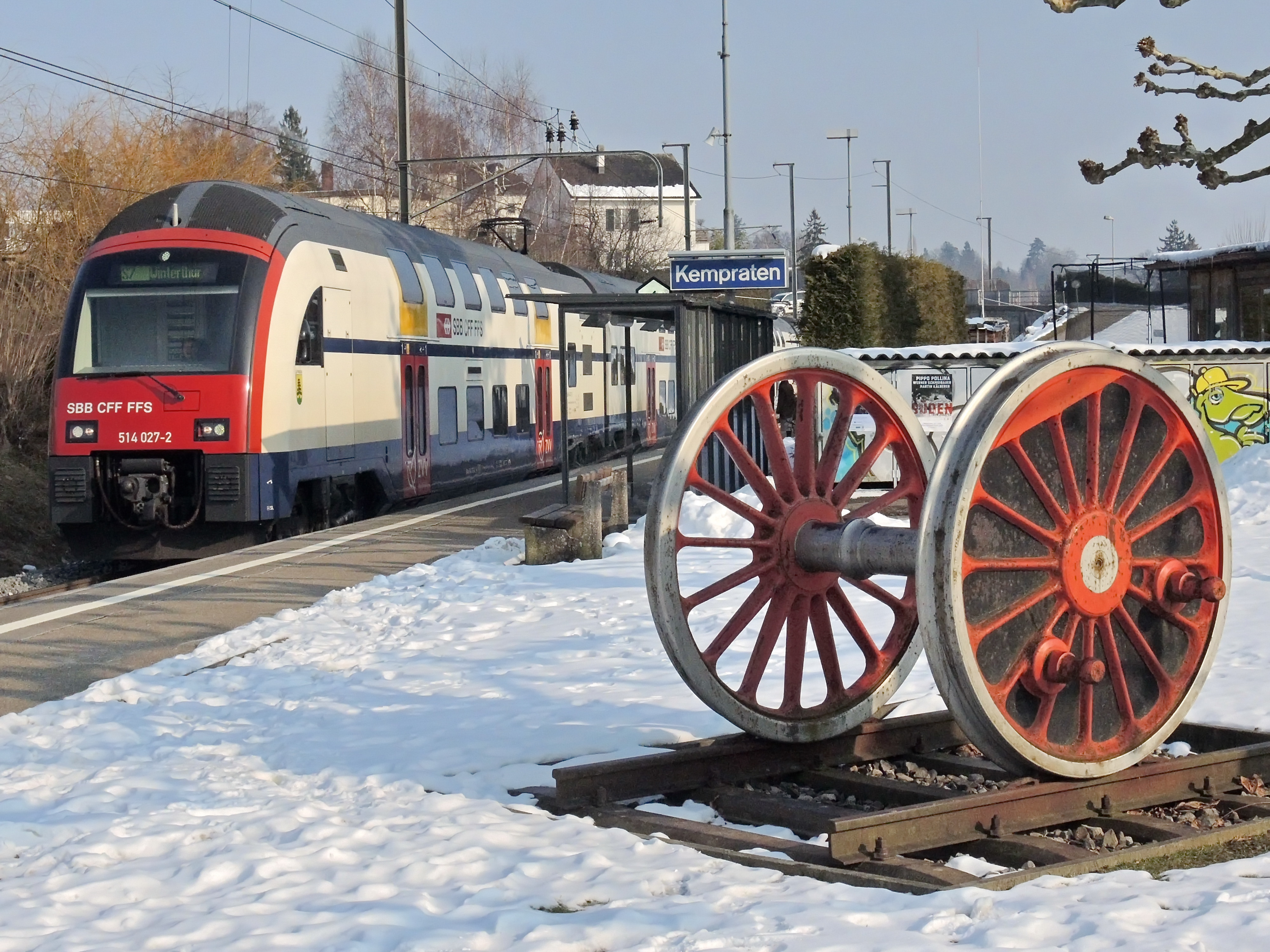
- An SBB RABe 514 EMU operating as S7 service at Kempraten station in 2013

General information
- Location: Zürcherstrasse; Kempraten, Rapperswil-Jona, St. Gallen; Switzerland
- Coordinates: 47°14′18″N 8°48′51″E
- Elevation: 419 m (1,375 ft)
- Owner: Swiss Federal Railways
- Operator: Swiss Federal Railways
- Line: Lake Zürich right-bank railway line
- Distance: 33.8 km (21.0 mi) from Zürich Hauptbahnhof
- Platforms: 1 side platform
- Tracks: 1
- Train operators: Swiss Federal Railways
- Connections: VZO (including Stadtbus Rapperswil-Jona) buses 885 994

Construction
- Parking: present
- Cycle facilities: present

Other information
- Fare zone: 180 (ZVV); 996 (Tarifverbund Ostwind)

Services
Preceding station	Zurich S-Bahn	Following station
Feldbach towards Winterthur	S7	Rapperswil Terminus
Location
- Location within Switzerland Location within Canton of St. Gallen

Kempraten railway station (German: Bahnhof Kempraten) is a railway station in the Swiss canton of St. Gallen, situated near the village of Kempraten in the municipality of Rapperswil-Jona. The station is located on the Lake Zurich right bank railway line, within both fare zone 180 of the Zürcher Verkehrsverbund (ZVV) and fare zone 996 of the Ostwind Fare Network.

Kempraten is one of four active railway stations in Rapperswil-Jona (the others being Rapperswil, Jona and Blumenau).

== Service ==
=== Rail ===
The station is served by the S7 S-Bahn service of Zurich S-Bahn, operated by Swiss Federal Railways. The S7 service operates half-hourly between Rapperswil and Winterthur via Meilen, Zürich HB, Balsberg (Zürich Airport) and Kloten. Summary of S-Bahn service:

- Zurich S-Bahn:
  - S7: half-hourly service to Winterthur via Zürich HB, and to Rapperswil.

=== Bus ===
A bus stop (Kempraten, Bahnhof) exists within walking distance to the railway station. This bus stop is served by Verkehrsbetriebe Zürichsee und Oberland (VZO) line 885 and line 994 of Stadtbus Rapperswil-Jona (also operated by VZO). Bus services are as follows:

Line	Route
885	Rapperswil Bahnhof – Cityplatz – Sonnenhof – Kempraten, Bahnhof – Schönau – Rüti ZH, Bahnhof – Wald ZH, Bahnhof – Goldingen – Atzmännig, Schutt
994	Rapperswil Bahnhof – Cityplatz – Sonnenhof – Kempraten, Bahnhof – Wohnheim Balm – Schönau – Jona, Bahnhof

== See also ==
- Rail transport in Switzerland
