= Blumenau railway station =

Railway station in Switzerland

Blumenau
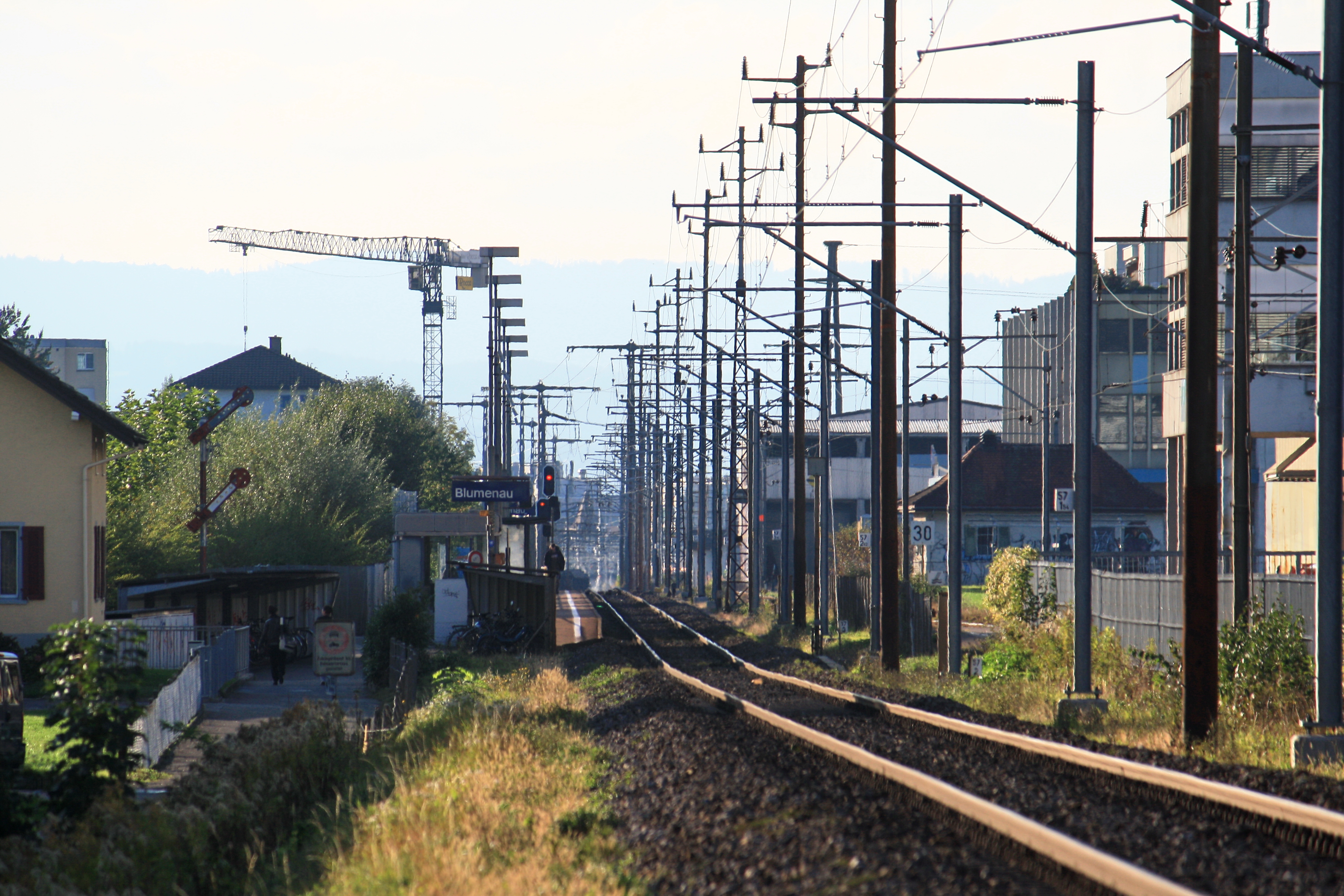
- The single station platform in 2009

General information
- Location: Oberseestrasse; Rapperswil-Jona, St. Gallen; Switzerland
- Coordinates: 47°13′25″N 8°50′33″E
- Elevation: 413 m (1,355 ft)
- Owner: Swiss Federal Railways
- Line: Rapperswil–Ziegelbrücke
- Distance: 57.3 km (35.6 mi) from Sargans
- Platforms: 1
- Train operators: Südostbahn (SOB)
- Connections: VZO buses (Stadtbus Rapperswil-Jona) 991 992 996

Construction
- Cycle facilities: present, with roof

Other information
- Fare zone: 180 (ZVV); 995 and 996 (Tarifverbund Ostwind)

History
- Rebuilt: 2023

Passengers
- 2018: 500 per weekday

Services
Preceding station	St. Gallen S-Bahn	Following station
Rapperswil Terminus	S6	Schmerikon towards Schwanden or Linthal
Rapperswil Terminus	S17	Schmerikon towards Sargans
Location
- Location within Switzerland Location within Canton of St. Gallen

Blumenau railway station (German: Bahnhof Blumenau) is one of four active railway stations in the municipality of Rapperswil-Jona in the Swiss canton of St. Gallen. The other three railway stations are Rapperswil, Jona and Kempraten. Blumenau railway station is located on the Rapperswil to Ziegelbrücke line of Swiss Federal Railways. The next station towards east is now Schmerikon, but until 2004 it used to be Bollingen.

Built in the 1980's, the station was refurbished in 2023 and the platform was lenghtend.

== Services ==
=== Train ===
As of the December 2023 timetable change, the following S-Bahn services stop at Blumenau railway station:

- St. Gallen S-Bahn S6 / S17: half-hourly service between Rapperswil and Ziegelbrücke and hourly service to Schwanden / Linthal or Sargans.

=== Bus ===
Two bus stops are within walking distance to Blumenau railway station: Geberit (north of the railway station) and Grünfeld (south of the station). Both are served by municipal bus lines 991 and 992 (and 996 during peak-hours) of Stadtbus Rapperswil-Jona, which is provided by Verkehrsbetriebe Zürichsee und Oberland (VZO). As of the December 2023 timetable change, bus services are as follows:

Line	Route
991	Rapperswil Bahnhof Süd – Kinderzoo – Grünfeld – Geberit – Schachen – Jona, Bahnhof
992	Sonnenhof – Glärnischstrasse – Grünfeld – Geberit – Feldlistrasse – Jona, Bahnhof
996	Rapperswil Bahnhof Süd – Kinderzoo – Grünfeld – Geberit – Schachen/Feldlistrasse – Jona, Bahnhof
