= Rapperswil railway station =

Railway station in Switzerland

Rapperswil
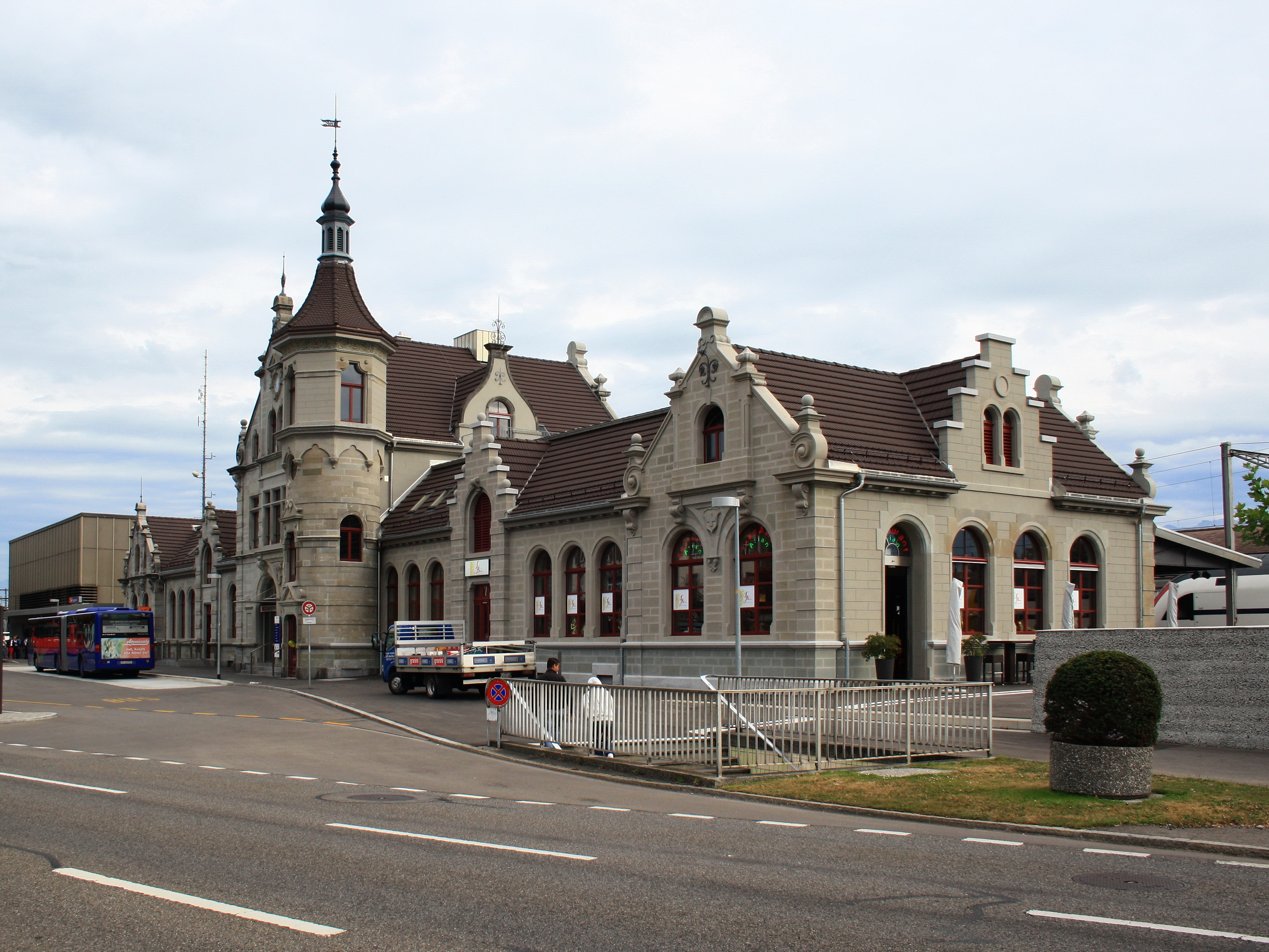
- Building of the Rapperswil railway station, bus terminal to the left

General information
- Location: Untere Bahnhofstrasse (Lower Station Road); Rapperswil; Switzerland
- Coordinates: 47°13′30″N 8°49′00″E
- Elevation: 408 m (1,339 ft)
- Owner: Swiss Federal Railways
- Lines: Lake Zürich right-bank line; Wallisellen to Rapperswil via Uster line; Rapperswil to Pfäffikon line; Rapperswil to Ziegelbrücke line
- Distance: 36.0 km (22.4 mi) from Zürich; 59.4 km (36.9 mi) from Sargans
- Platforms: 6 (3 island, 1 side platforms)
- Tracks: 7
- Train operators: Swiss Federal Railways; Südostbahn (SOB)
- Connections: Zurich Transport Network (ZVV), Tarifverbund Ostwind
- Ship: Lake Zurich passenger cruises (ZSG); Obersee ferry (Oberseefähre)
- Bus: Schneider 622; VZO 885 991 993 994 996
- Airport: With S15 or S7 to/from Zürich Airport in 0:55h with one change

Other information
- Fare zone: 180 (ZVV); 996 (Ostwind Fare Network)

History
- Opened: 1859
- Rebuilt: 1895 and 2008

Passengers
- 2025: 25,300 per day (SBB, SOB)
- Rank: 30 out of 1,095

Services
Preceding station	Südostbahn	Following station
Uznach towards St. Gallen	Voralpen Express	Pfäffikon SZ towards Lucerne
Preceding station	Zurich S-Bahn	Following station
Jona towards Zug	S5	Pfäffikon SZ Terminus
Kempraten towards Winterthur	S7	Terminus
Jona towards Niederweningen	S15	Terminus
Terminus	S40	Hurden towards Einsiedeln
Jona towards Knonau	SN5 Limited service	Hurden towards Pfäffikon SZ
Preceding station	St. Gallen S-Bahn	Following station
Uznach towards St. Gallen	S4	Terminus
Blumenau towards Schwanden	S6	Terminus
Blumenau towards Sargans	S17	Terminus
Location
- Location within Switzerland Location within Canton of St. Gallen

Rapperswil railway station (German: Bahnhof Rapperswil) is located next to the old town and harbour of Rapperswil in the Swiss canton of St. Gallen. It lies within both fare zone 180 of the Zürcher Verkehrsverbund (ZVV) and fare zone 996 of the Ostwind Fare Network. It is the largest of four active railway stations in the municipality of Rapperswil-Jona (the other three being Jona, Kempraten and Blumenau). Rapperswil railway station is situated on the north shore of Lake Zürich at the northern end of the Seedamm, which separates the Obersee (upper Lake Zürich) from the main body of the lake.

Because the Seedamm carries both rail and road connections from the south shore of the lake, and because Rapperswil is the meeting point of three separate line from the northern side of the lake, the station is a major nodal point on the local rail network, notably of the Zurich Transport Network (ZVV). The first railway opened in 1859.

== History ==
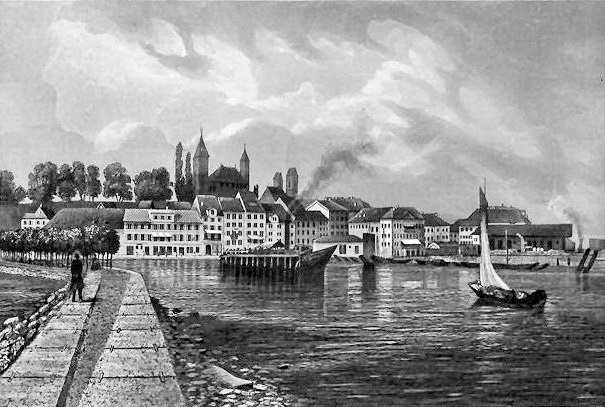
Rapperswil harbour, Schloss and Altstadt, the first station buildings to the right (~ 1867)

In early 1859 the first steam train ran from Rapperswil – as a hub of railway lines from Rapperswil to Rüti and from Rapperswil to Schmerikon. Turntables and cranes were used to move cargo to/from the vessels at the harbour situated at nearby Fischmarktplatz.

In 1875, the Lake Zürich left bank line (Linksufige Zürichseebahn) from Zürich Hauptbahnhof to Ziegelbrücke opened along the south shore of the lake. In railway terms, this was linked to Rapperswil in 1878, when the Gotthardbahn established the line across the Seedamm. The Rapperswil shore of Lake Zürich had to wait until 1895 for the opening of the Lake Zürich right bank line (Rechtsufrige Zürichseebahn).

The famous Orient Express stopped in Rapperswil on its way from Varna to Zürich, Basel, Paris and Calais.

Since 1877 Rapperswil has been a major hub of what is now the Südostbahn (SOB), with a large depot. The current station building in Renaissance Revival architecture style was built in 1894/95, planned by architect Karl August Hiller, underlining the growing importance of tourism.

The railway station's infrastructure, including the bus terminal and the station building, were renewed in 2007/8, and the rail tracks and the infrastructure by June/July 2016.

== Operation ==
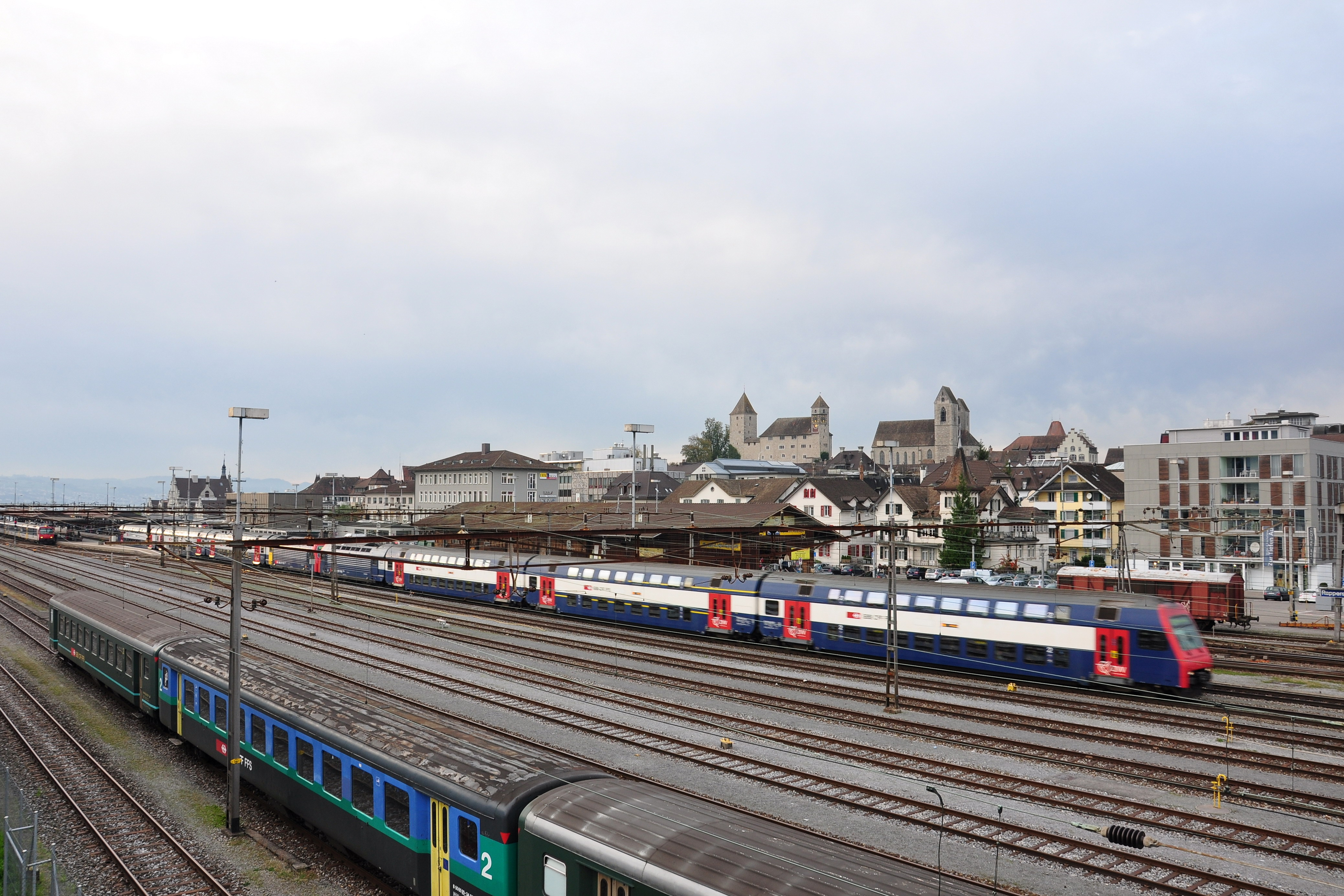
Railway station area, Schloss Rapperswil and St. John's Church to the right, Seedamm and railway station building in the background (to the left)

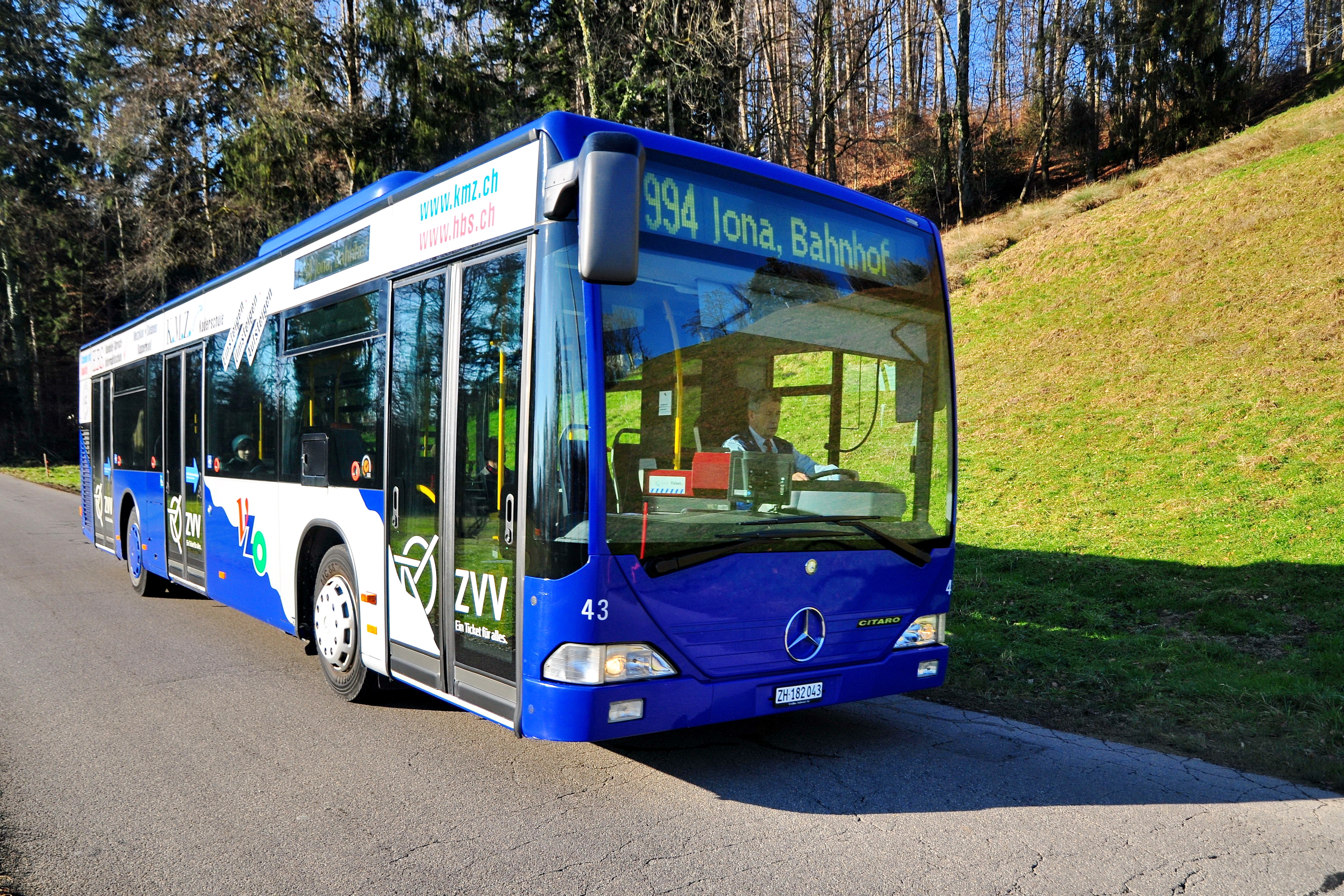
Bus of VZO

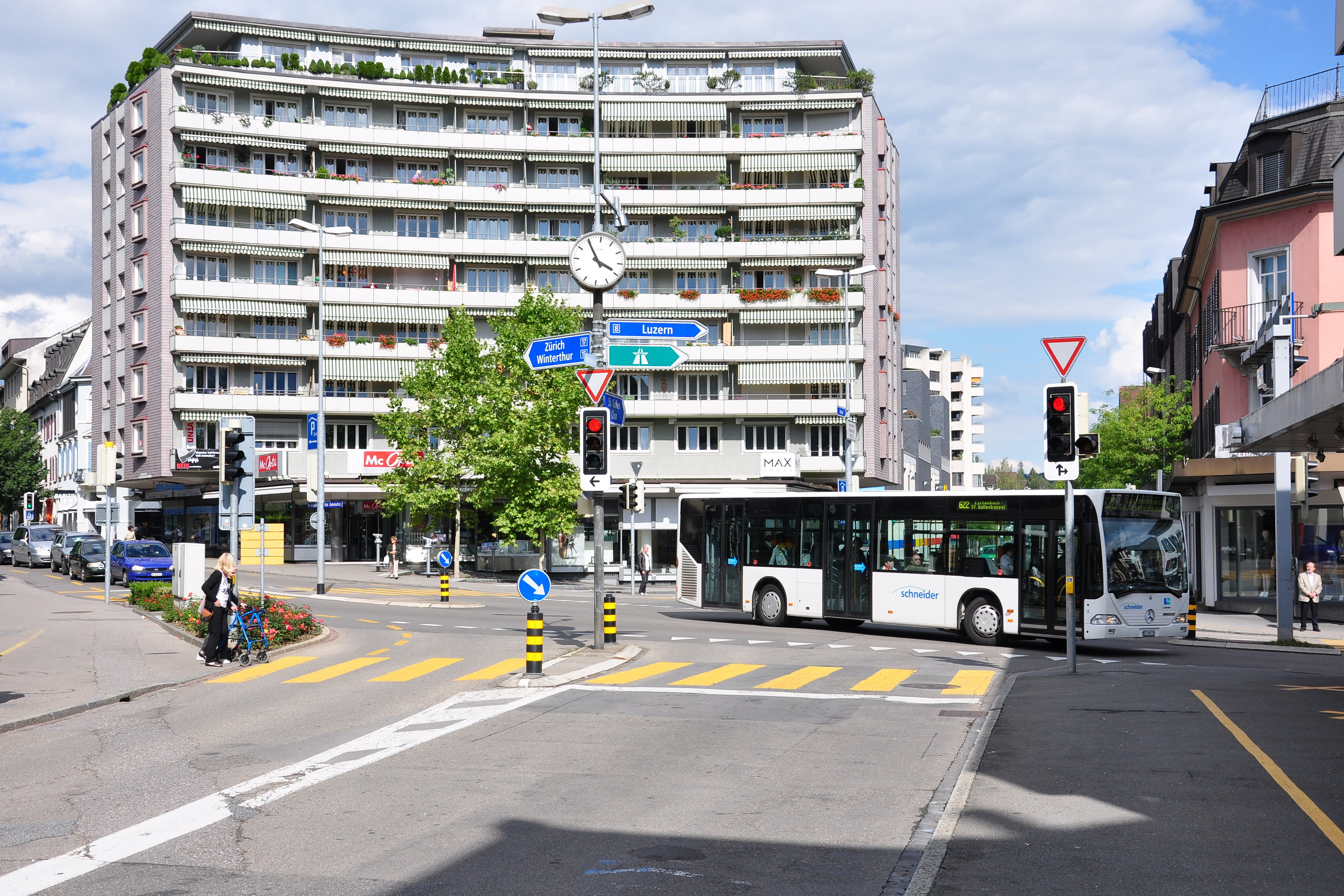
Schneider Bus crossing the Cityplatz

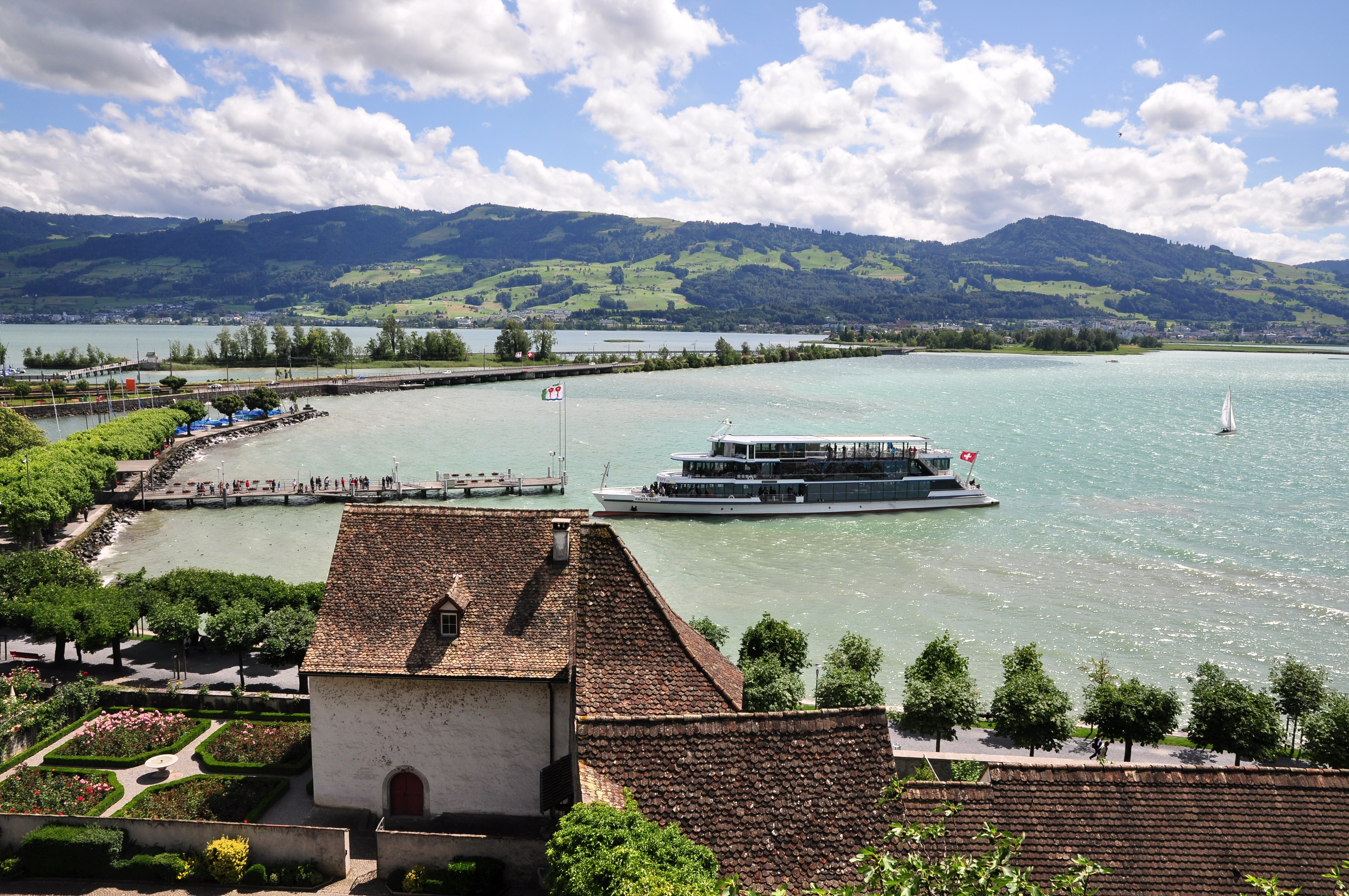
Boat of ZSG arriving at Rapperswil harbour (railway tracks on Seedamm in the background)

=== Train ===
Rapperswil railway station is an important junction station, where the Südostbahn's (SOB) Rapperswil to Pfäffikon railway line across the Seedamm meets with the Lake Zürich right bank line, the Wallisellen to Rapperswil via Uster line and the Rapperswil to Ziegelbrücke line.

Rapperswil is served by services of two S-Bahn-style networks, the Zürich S-Bahn and the St. Gallen S-Bahn. Services S5, S7, S15 and S40 of the Zürich S-Bahn call at this railway station. Connections to or from Zürich HB via either the right bank line (S7) or Uster line (S5/15) are very frequent, and the ride takes only about 36 minutes. The S40 provides a local link to Pfäffikon and Einsiedeln. Rapperswil is also the terminus of the hourly St. Gallen S-Bahn services S4, S6, and S17 that operate south-east to Schwanden/Linthal via Ziegelbrücke. Rapperswil is also a calling point of the Voralpen Express, an InterRegio (IR) train operated by the SOB and providing an hourly direct link between St. Gallen and Lucerne. During weekends, there is also a nighttime S-Bahn service (SN5) offered by ZVV.

Summary of railway services:

- IR Voralpen-Express: hourly service to Luzern via Arth-Goldau, and to St. Gallen via Wattwil.
- St. Gallen S-Bahn:
  - S4: hourly service to Sargans via St. Gallen.
  - S6 / S17: half-hourly service to Ziegelbrücke and hourly service to Schwanden / Linthal or Sargans.
- Zürich S-Bahn:
  - S5: half-hourly service to Zug via Jona and Zürich HB, and to Pfäffikon SZ.
  - S7: half-hourly service to Winterthur via Kempraten, Meilen, Zürich HB and Kloten Balsberg (near Zurich Airport).
  - S15: half-hourly service to Niederweningen via Jona and Zürich HB.
  - S40: half-hourly service to Einsiedeln via Pfäffikon SZ and Biberbrugg.
  - Nighttime S-Bahn (only during weekends):
    - SN5: hourly service between Knonau and Pfäffikon SZ (via Zürich HB).

Rapperswil is also an important depot for the rolling stock of the Zürich S-Bahn. Due to the station's hub status, one of the few SBB-CFF-FFS firefighting and rescue trains (LRZ) is based in Rapperswil.

=== Bus ===
Buses provided by Verkehrsbetriebe Zürichsee und Oberland (VZO) (Lake Zurich and Oberland transport services) link the station to the upper northern shore of Lake Zürich and the Zürcher Oberland, and also operate the city's own Stadtbus Rapperswil-Jona. One bus service, provided by Schneider, links the railway station with Eschenbach and Wattwil. Most bus services depart from the forecourt of the railway station, except lines 991 and 996 (the latter operates only during peak-hours), which depart south of the railway station (Rapperswil Bahnhof Süd). As of the December 2023 timetable change, the lines are as follows:

Line	Route	Operator
622	Rapperswil Bahnhof – Cityplatz – Sonnenhof – Kreuz (Jona railway station) – Jona Center – St. Dyonis – Wagen – Eschenbach – St. Gallenkappel (– Ricken – Wattwil)	Schneider
885	Rapperswil Bahnhof – Cityplatz – Sonnenhof – Kempraten, Bahnhof – Schönau – Rüti ZH, Bahnhof – Wald ZH, Bahnhof – Goldingen – Atzmännig, Schutt	(VZO)
991	Rapperswil Bahnhof Süd – Kinderzoo – Grünfeld – Geberit (Blumenau railway station) – Jona, Bahnhof	Stadtbus Rapperswil-Jona (VZO)
993	Rapperswil Bahnhof – Cityplatz – Sonnenhof – Altersheim Meienberg – Vogelau (Jona railway station) – Tägernau	Stadtbus Rapperswil-Jona (VZO)
994	Rapperswil Bahnhof – Cityplatz – Sonnenhof – Kempraten, Bahnhof – Wohnheim Balm – Schönau – Jona, Bahnhof	Stadtbus Rapperswil-Jona (VZO)
996	Rapperswil Bahnhof Süd – Kinderzoo – Grünfeld – Geberit (Blumenau railway station) – Schachen/Feldlistrasse – Jona, Bahnhof	Stadtbus Rapperswil-Jona (VZO)

==== History ====
Until the timetable change on 10 December 2023, bus line 621 (operated by Schneider) operated between Rapperswil railway station and Jona, Buechstrasse Ost. This line stopped operations due to the increase in frequency of line 622, which mostly uses the same route. Line 995 operated between Rapperswil railway station and Hummelberg, but its leg between Kreuz (Jona railway station) and Rapperswil railway station was truncated in December 2023 for the same reason. Line 995 now also serves the leg from Jona Center to Jona, Buechstrasse Ost formerly operated by line 621.

=== Boat ===
Rapperswil harbour is adjacent to the railway station, and lake shipping services of the Zürichsee-Schifffahrtsgesellschaft (ZSG) connect with trains and buses, providing alternative, if rather slower, routes to Zürich and other lakeside towns on Lake Zürich. Most boats dock Ufenau island near Rapperswil harbour.

During summer, there is also a ferry across Obersee. The ferry connects a pier adjacent to the University of Applied Sciences Rapperswil (now part of OST), situated south of the railways station, with Lachen and Altendorf in the canton of Schwyz.

== See also ==
- Rail transport in Switzerland
