= Wurmsbach Abbey =

Monastery in Switzerland

Coordinates: 47°13′12″N 8°51′54″E

Wurmsbach Abbey (German: Kloster Mariazell-Wurmsbach) is a monastery of Cistercian nuns located in Bollingen, a locality of Rapperswil-Jona, in the Canton of St. Gallen, Switzerland. It is located on the north shore of upper Lake Zürich. The house is a part of the Order of Cistercians of the Common Observance (O.Cist.).

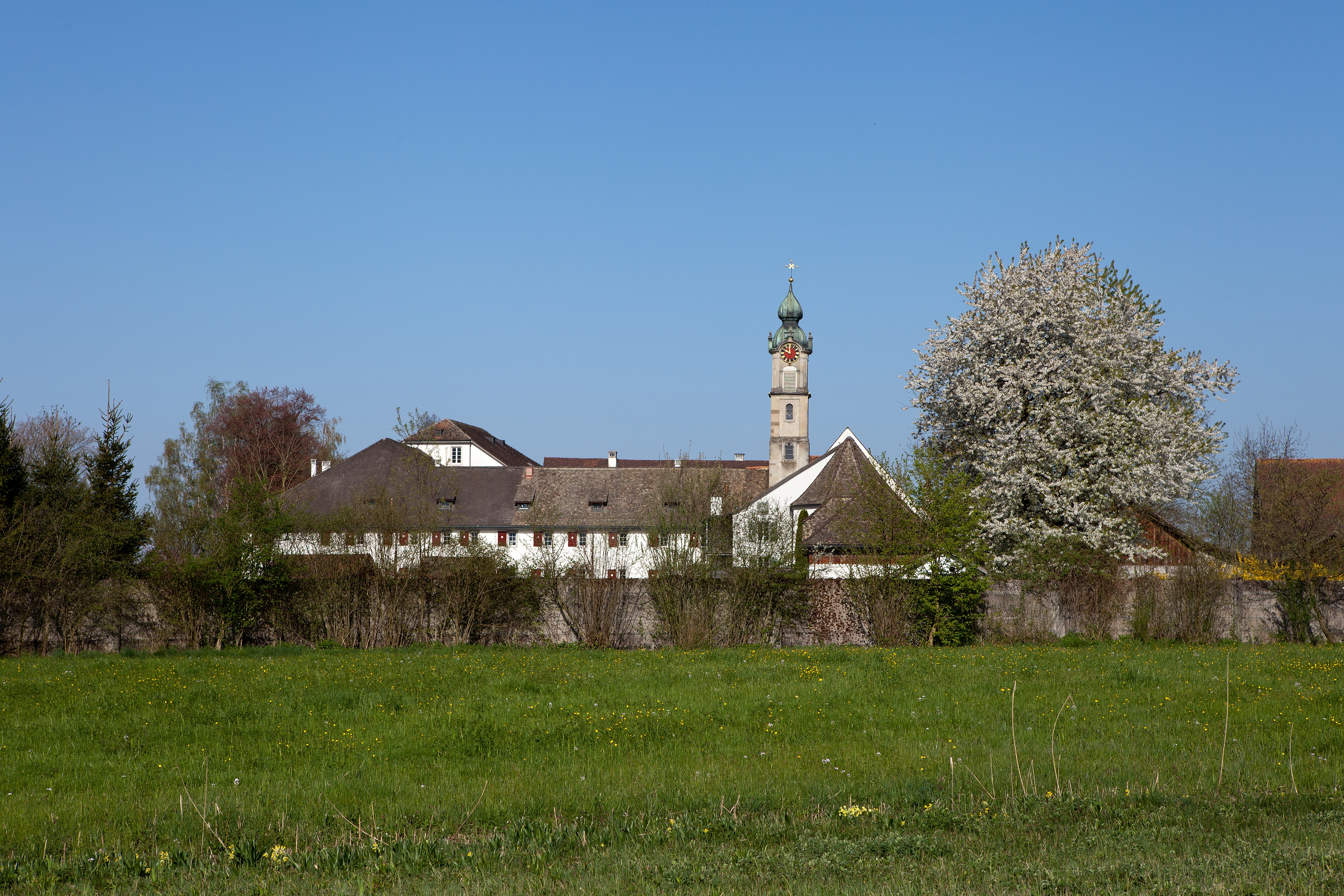
Mariazell-Wursmbach Abbey (April 2011)

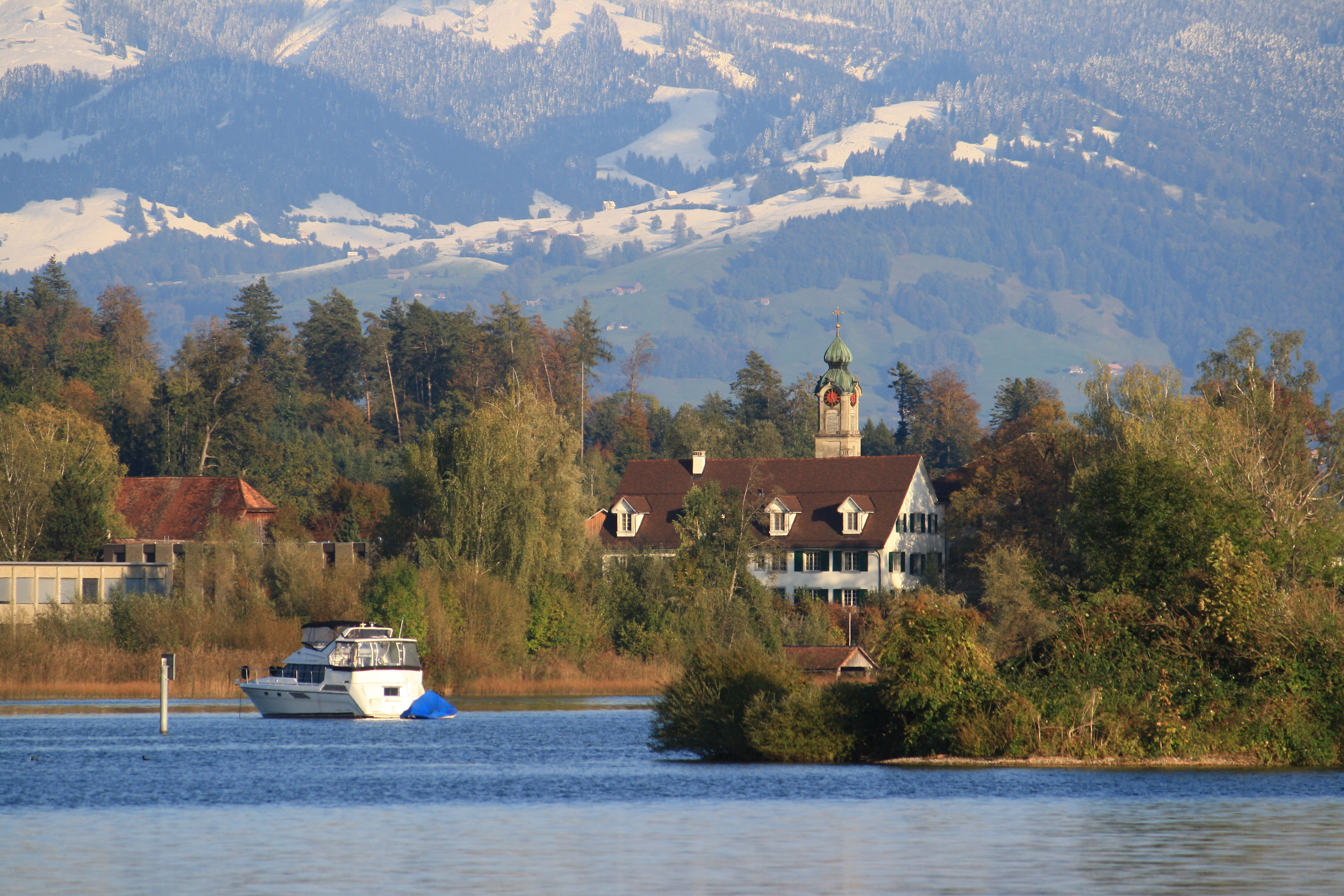
As seen from Jona (October 2009)

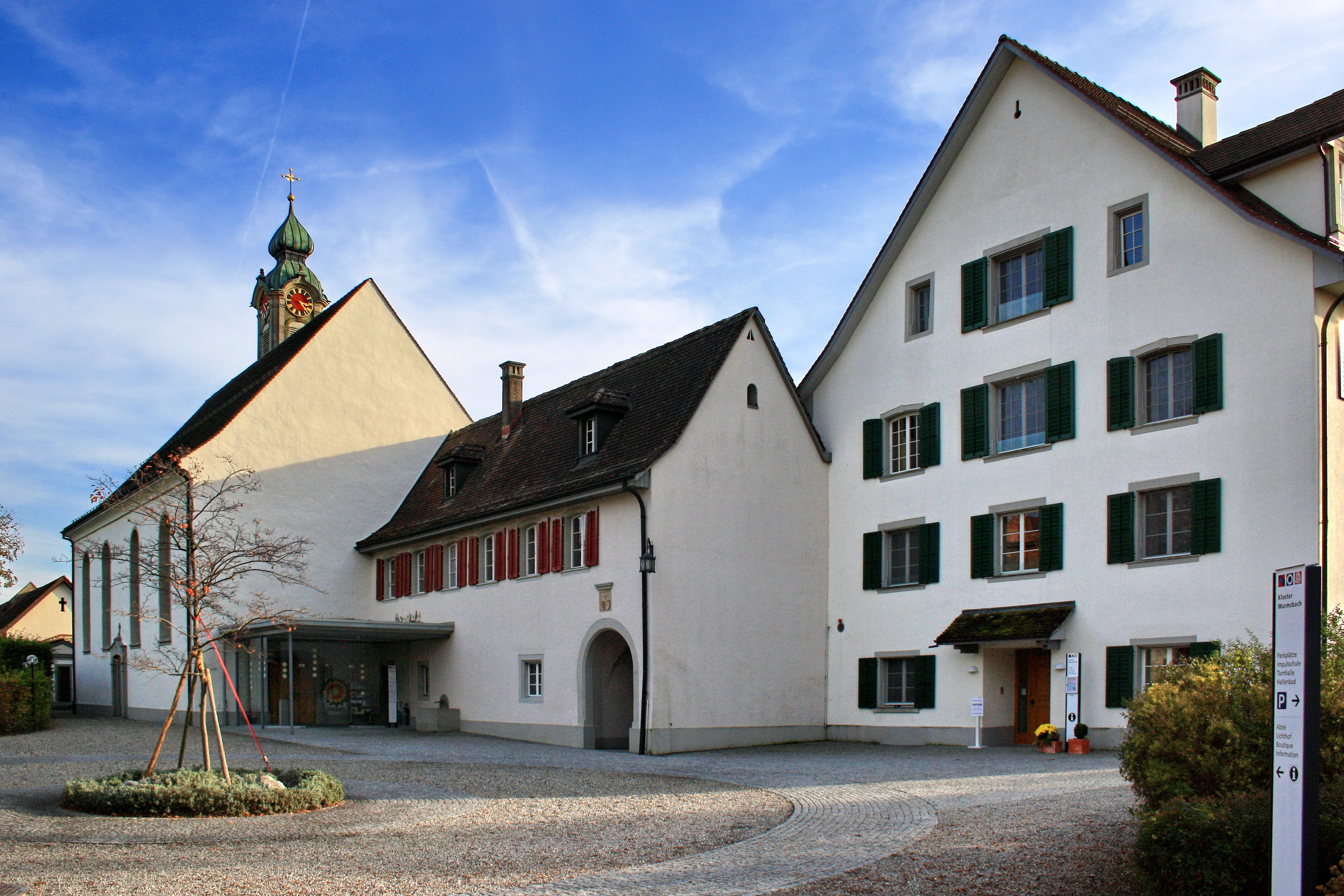
Church and portal (October 2009)

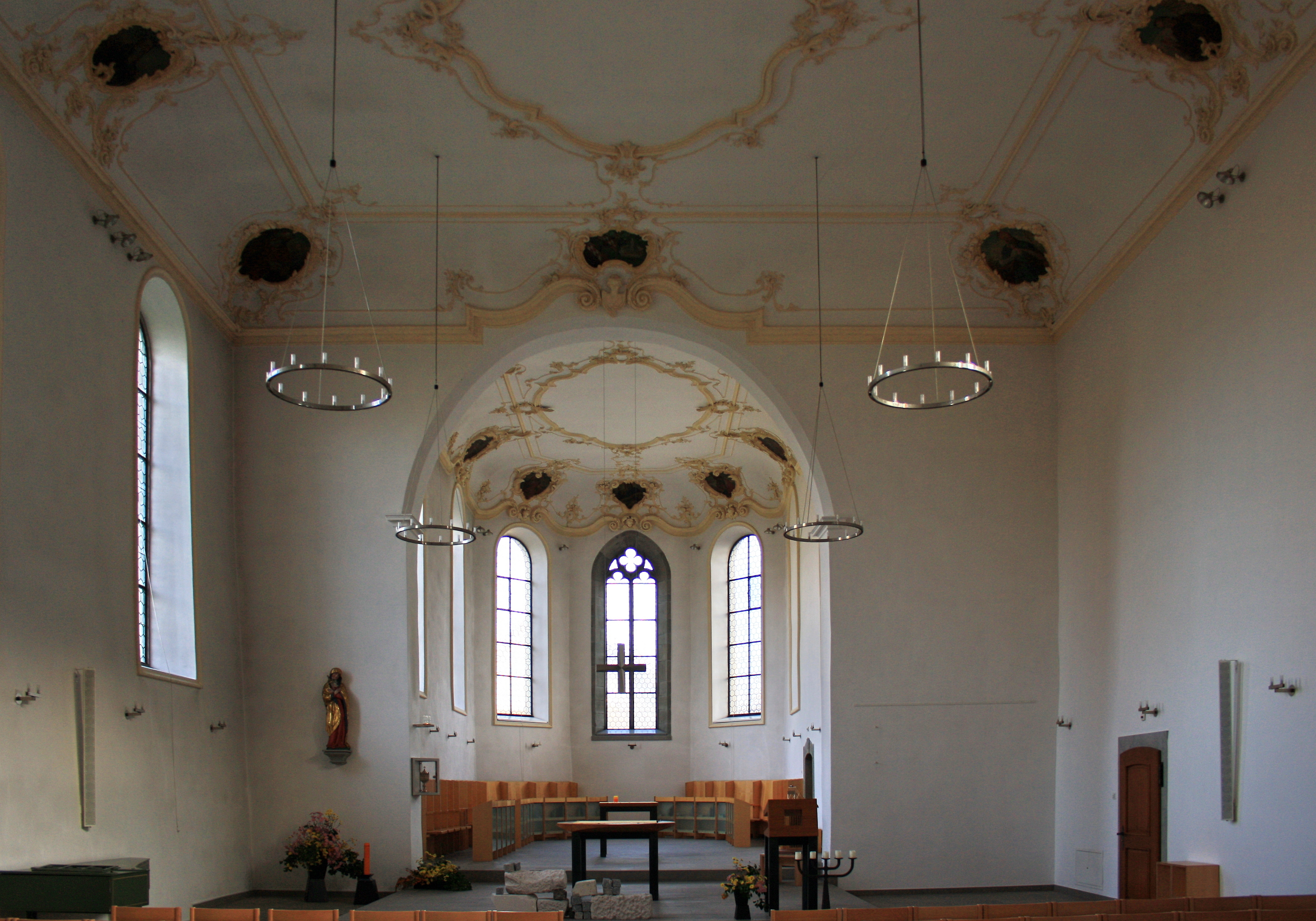

== History ==
Count Rudolf of Rapperswil gave his castle of Wurmsbach together with a considerable area of land in 1259 for the foundation of a religious house and the abbey was established. It was initially a dependency of the Cistercian monks of Abbey of St. Urban in Wettingen. The abbey church was dedicated in 1281. Bollinger Sandstein was used for the construction of the abbey by dedicated quarries.

Elisabeth von Rapperswil died probably on 10 April 1309 in the Rapperswil Castle and may have been buried in the Wurmsbach nunnery (†. Apr. IV. Idus: Elizabeth die Graffin, vnser Stiffterin. Excerpta ex Necromonast. Wurmspacensis) on Obersee lake shore. The graves of her younger brother Vinzenz and her mother were excavated in the nunnery, but Elisabeth's grave so far was not discovered.

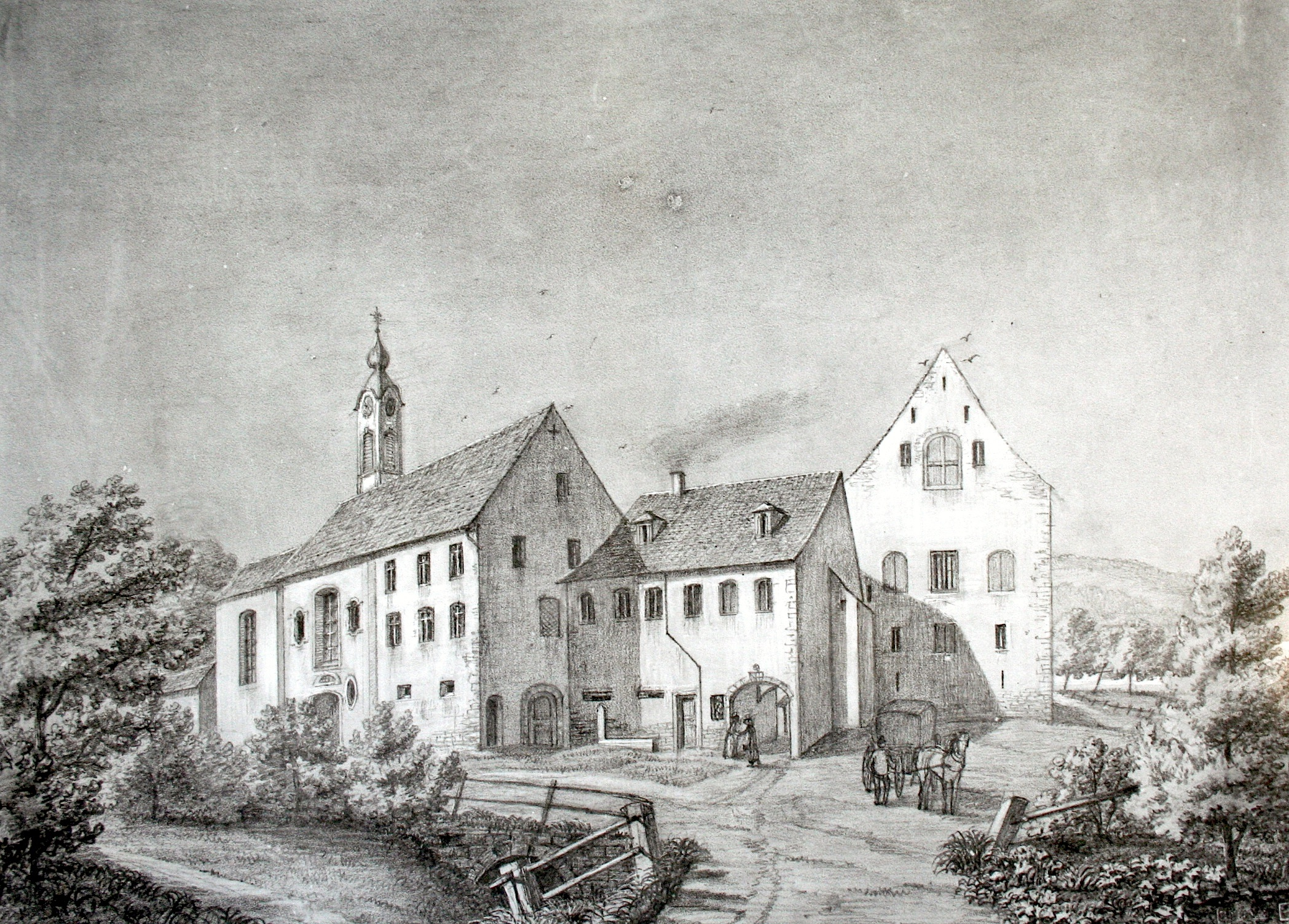
North view of the church, abbey, and guest-house. Pen and ink drawing by Johannes Rudolf Rahn, 1859

During the first Battle of Villmergen in 1656 and again during the occupation of the region by the French Revolutionary Army in 1799, the nuns were obliged to flee. On both occasions the abbey was completely pillaged, with the consequence that there are few treasures left.

As of 2011, there are 15 nuns in the community, led by Abbess Monika Thumm, O.Cist.

== Sights ==
The abbey is renowned for its location at the lake side. It overlooks uper Lake Zürich and the church is listed as a building of historical significance.

== Activities ==
The nuns run a secondary boarding school for girls. Gardening takes a great deal of time because the land owned by the abbey is considerable. The gardens are known for the herbal remedies grown.

== Cultural heritage ==
The building is listed in the Swiss inventory of cultural property of national and regional significance as a Class B object of regional importance.
