= Hurden ship canal =

Canal of the two parts of Lake Zurich in Switzerland

Coordinates: 47.207505°N 8.793831°E

Hurden Ship Canal
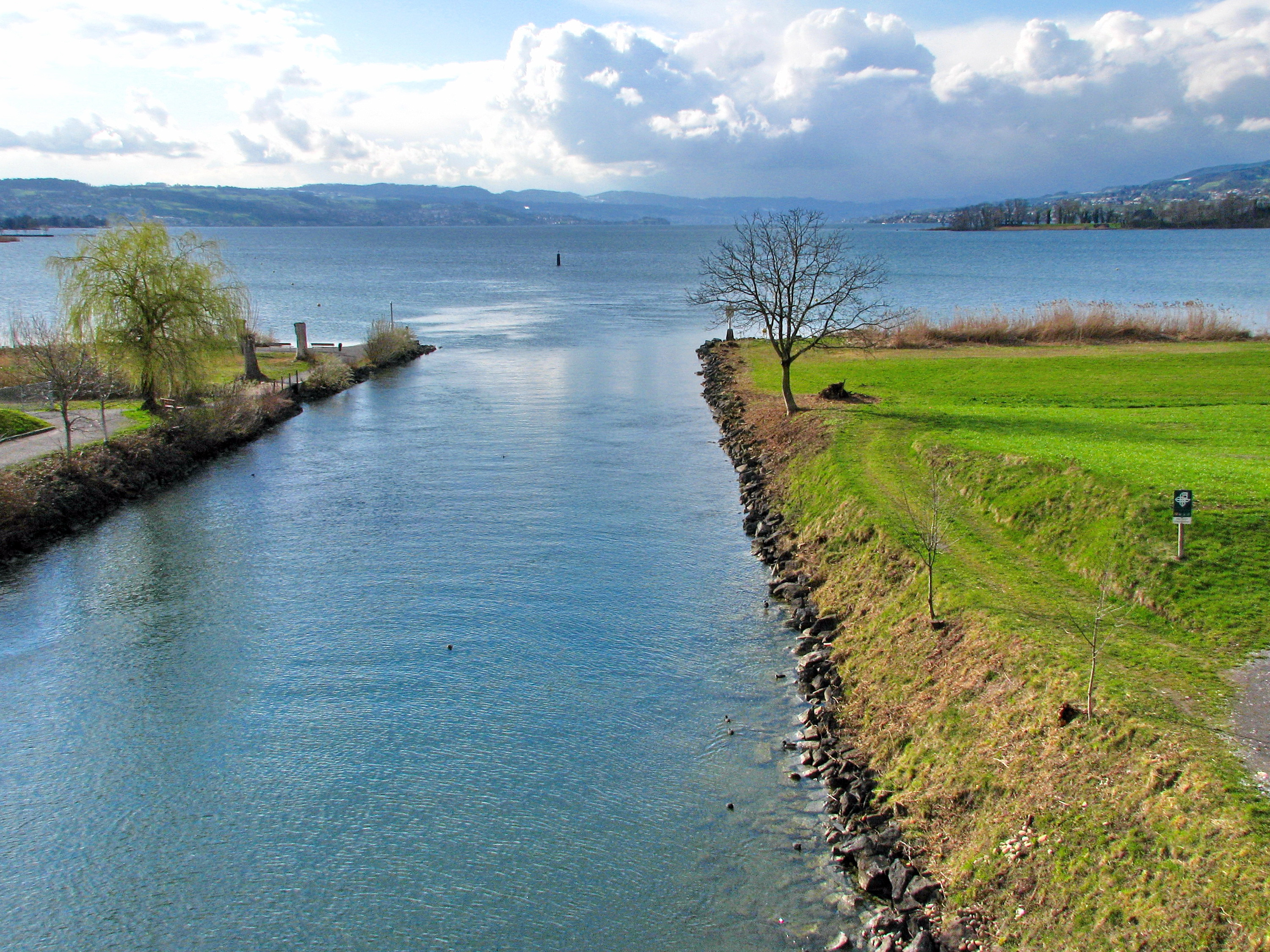
- The western (lower) entrance to the ship canal

Specifications
- Locks: none
- Status: Navigable

History
- Date completed: 1943

The Hurden ship canal (German: Schiffahrtskanal von Hurden) is a 500-metre (1,600 ft) long canal in the Swiss canton of Schwyz. It connects the lower section of Lake Zürich with the upper section, sometimes called the Obersee, permitting shipping services on the lake to pass between the two halves of the lake without passing through the shallows, and under the low bridges, of the Seedamm. The canal was opened in 1943, and cuts through the base of the peninsular containing the village of Hurden, thus placing the centre of the village on an artificial island.

The canal is spanned by the Sternenbrücke, which carries both road and railway, with the railway being used by the S5 and S40 lines of the S-Bahn Zürich and by the Südostbahn Voralpen Express. This bridge was renewed between March and November 2010 to allow 40 ton trucks to cross the Seedamm.

The canal's navigation channel is only wide enough to pass a single ship at a time, and vessels proceeding up the lake must give way to vessels proceeding downstream. Amongst other vessels, it is used by the paddle steamers and motor ships of the Zürichsee-Schifffahrtsgesellschaft on their services from the city of Zürich to the Obersee.

To the west of the Sternenbrücke, the canal passes through the Frauenwinkel nature reserve, with its important bog landscape.

== Gallery ==
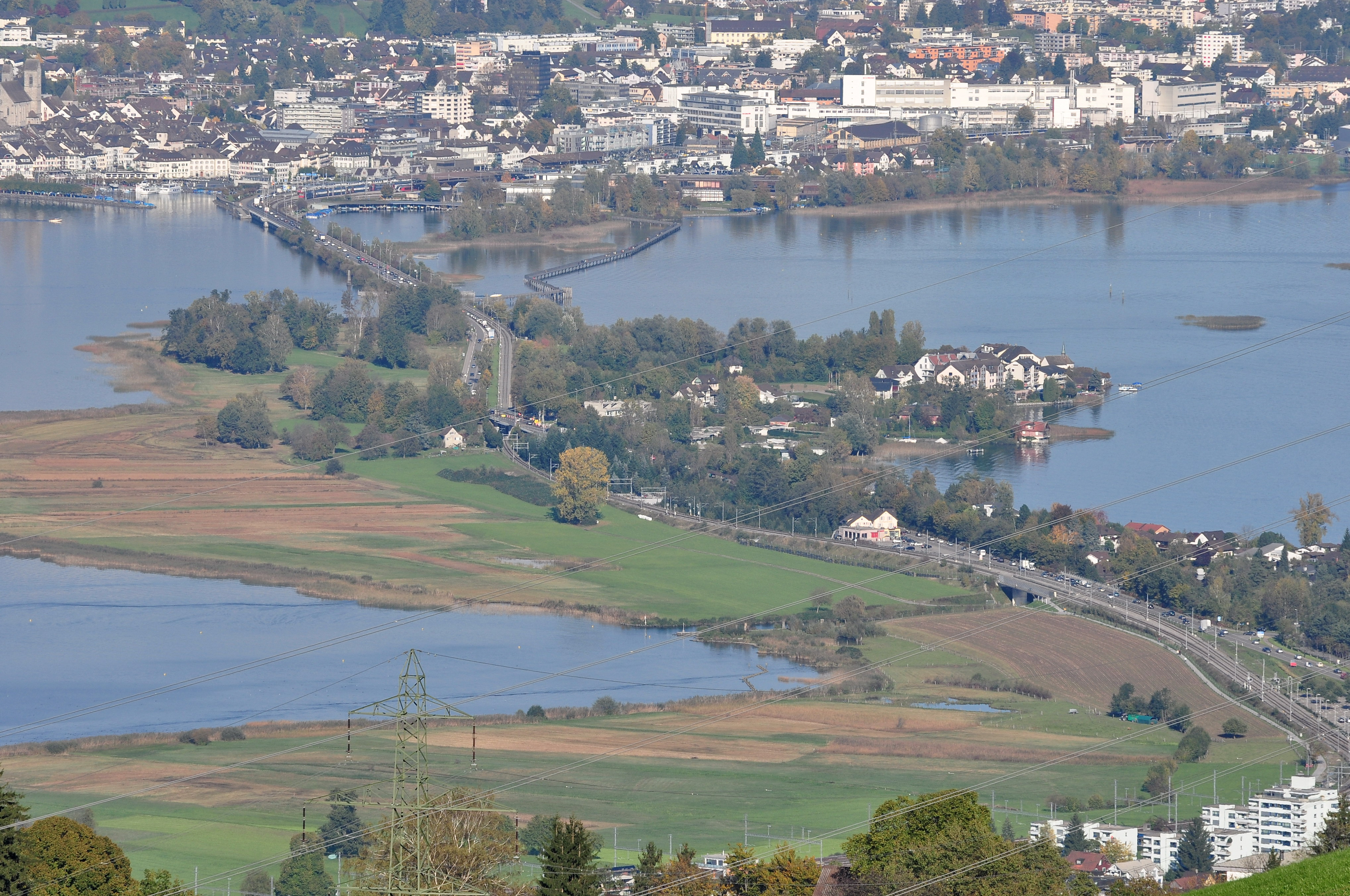
The Hurden peninsular with canal crossing it; Seedamm in background.

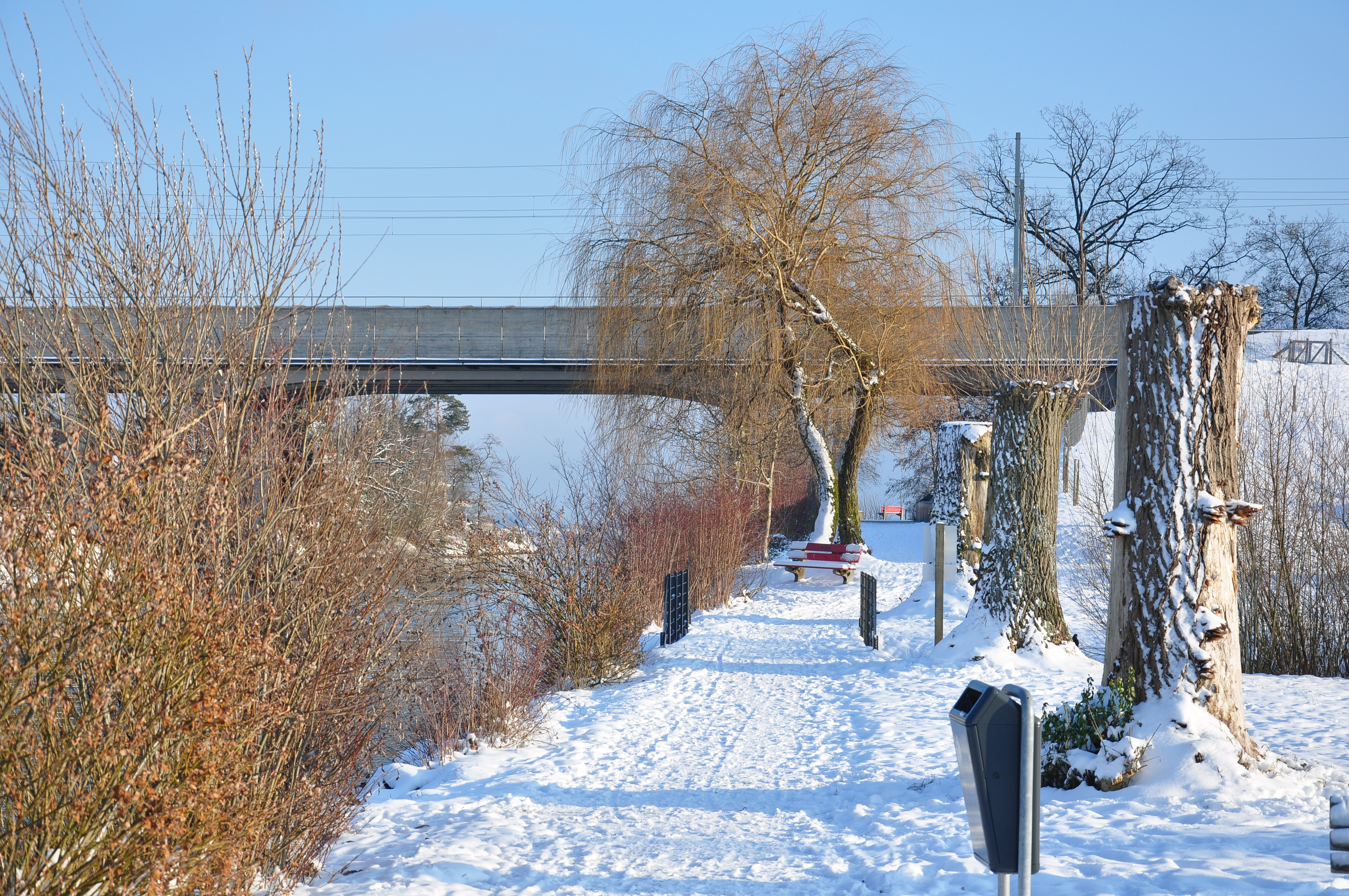
The canal and Sternenbrücke in winter.

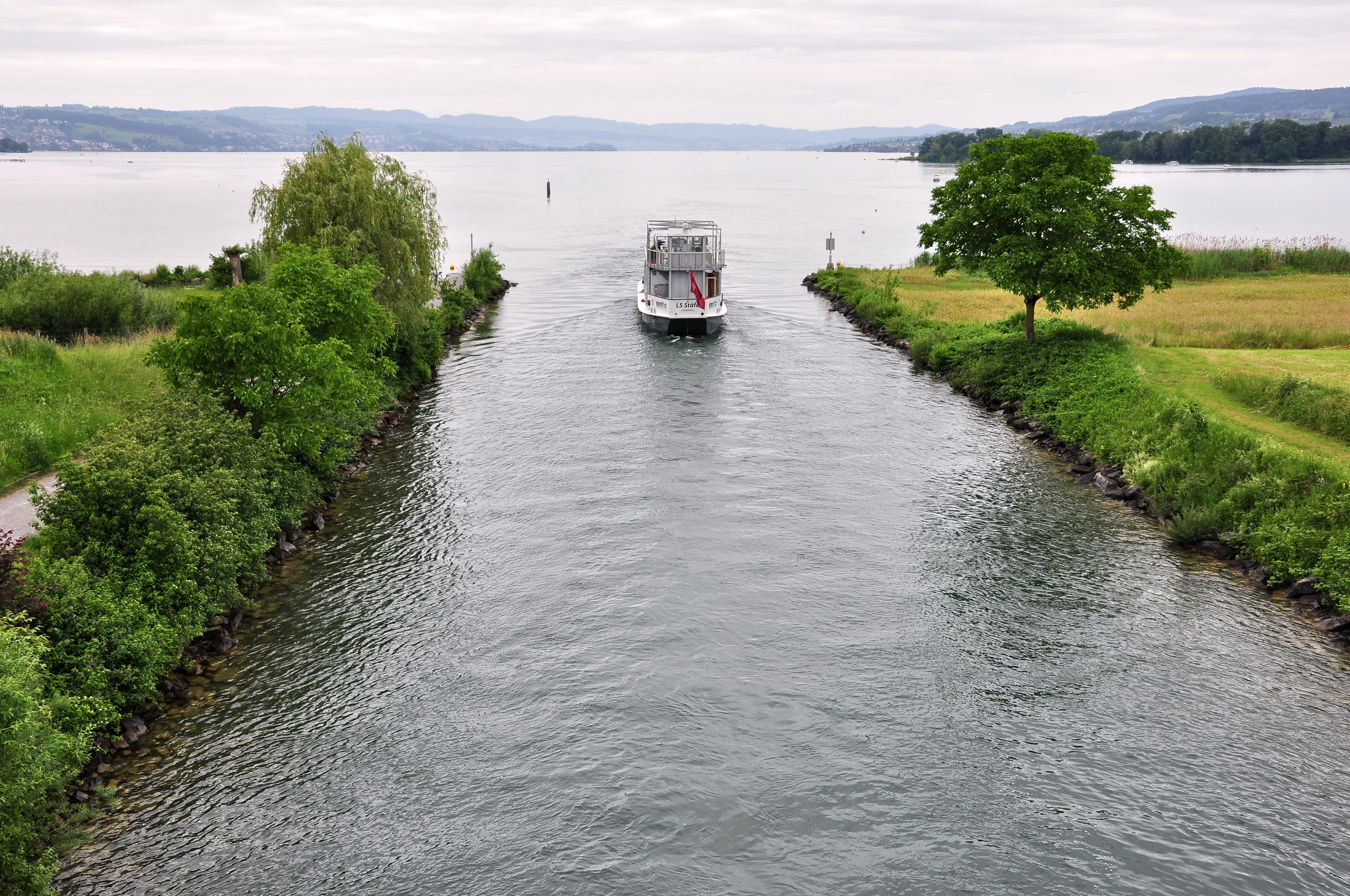
The LS Stäfa, a local restaurant barge, transiting the canal.
