= Obersee (Lake Zurich) =

Lake in Switzerland bordering the cantons of Schwyz and St. Gallen

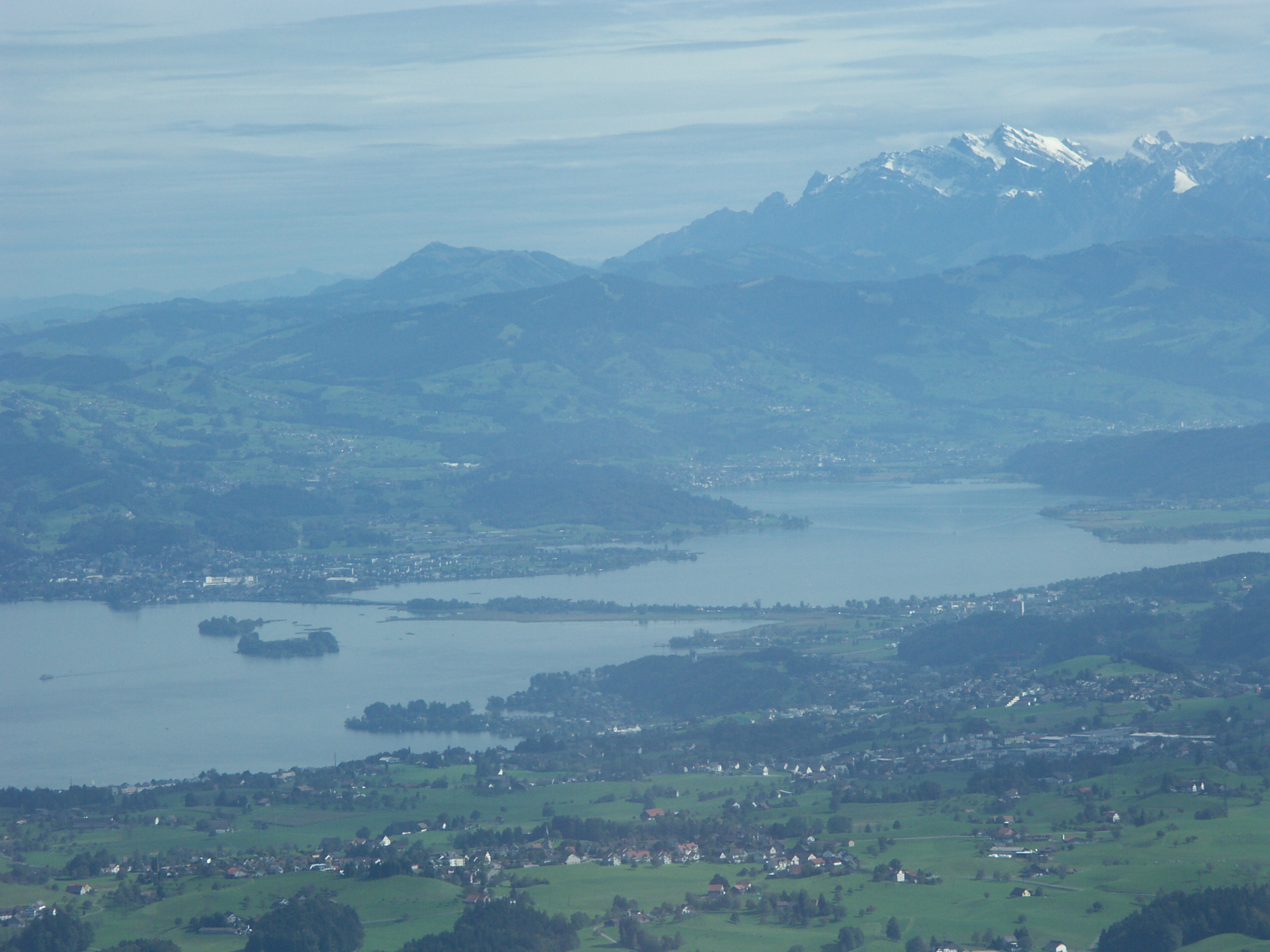
- Zürichsee ("lower lake", left) and Obersee (right) divided by the Hurden Peninsula (Säntis in the background)

- Location within Switzerland Location within Canton of Schwyz Location within Canton of Zurich Location within Canton of St. Gallen
- Interactive map of Obersee
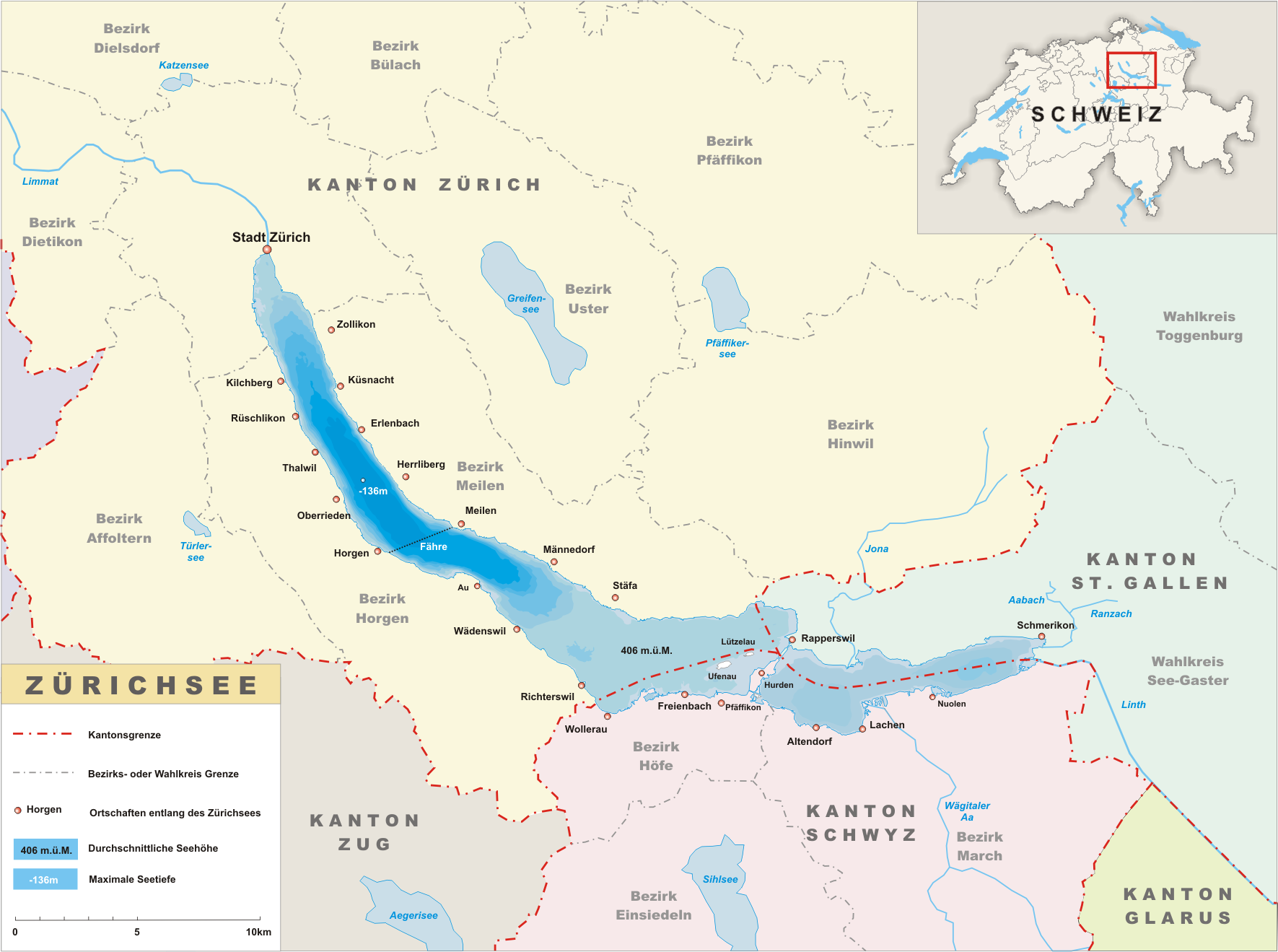
- The Obersee ('upper lake') is the smaller, southeasterly part of Lake Zurich
- Coordinates: 47°12′N 8°48′E
- Lake type: Glacial lake
- Primary inflows: Linth (Linthkanal), Jona, Wägitaler Aa, Schmerikoner Aa
- Primary outflows: Limmat
- Basin countries: Switzerland
- Max. length: 10.5 km (6.5 mi)
- Max. width: 2.5 km (1.6 mi)
- Surface area: 20.8 km^{2} (8.0 sq mi)
- Average depth: 23 m (75 ft)
- Max. depth: 48 m (157 ft)
- Water volume: 0.47 km^{3} (0.11 cu mi)
- Residence time: 10 weeks
- Surface elevation: 406 m (1,332 ft)
- Islands: Heilig Hüsli island

The Obersee (Swiss Standard German pronunciation: [ˈoːbərzeː], lit. 'Upper Lake') is the smaller of the two parts of Lake Zurich (Zürichsee), located upstream in the cantons of St. Gallen and Schwyz in Switzerland. It is almost completely separated from the lower (or main) part of Lake Zurich by the Hurden Peninsula, an Ice Age glacial moraine.

The lake is home to several species of birds, amphibians, fish and invertebrates. There are several protected areas (reeds, bogs, fens) along the lake's shores. Located in the Prealps (German: Voralpen), the lake is also a popular recreational area.

== Geography ==
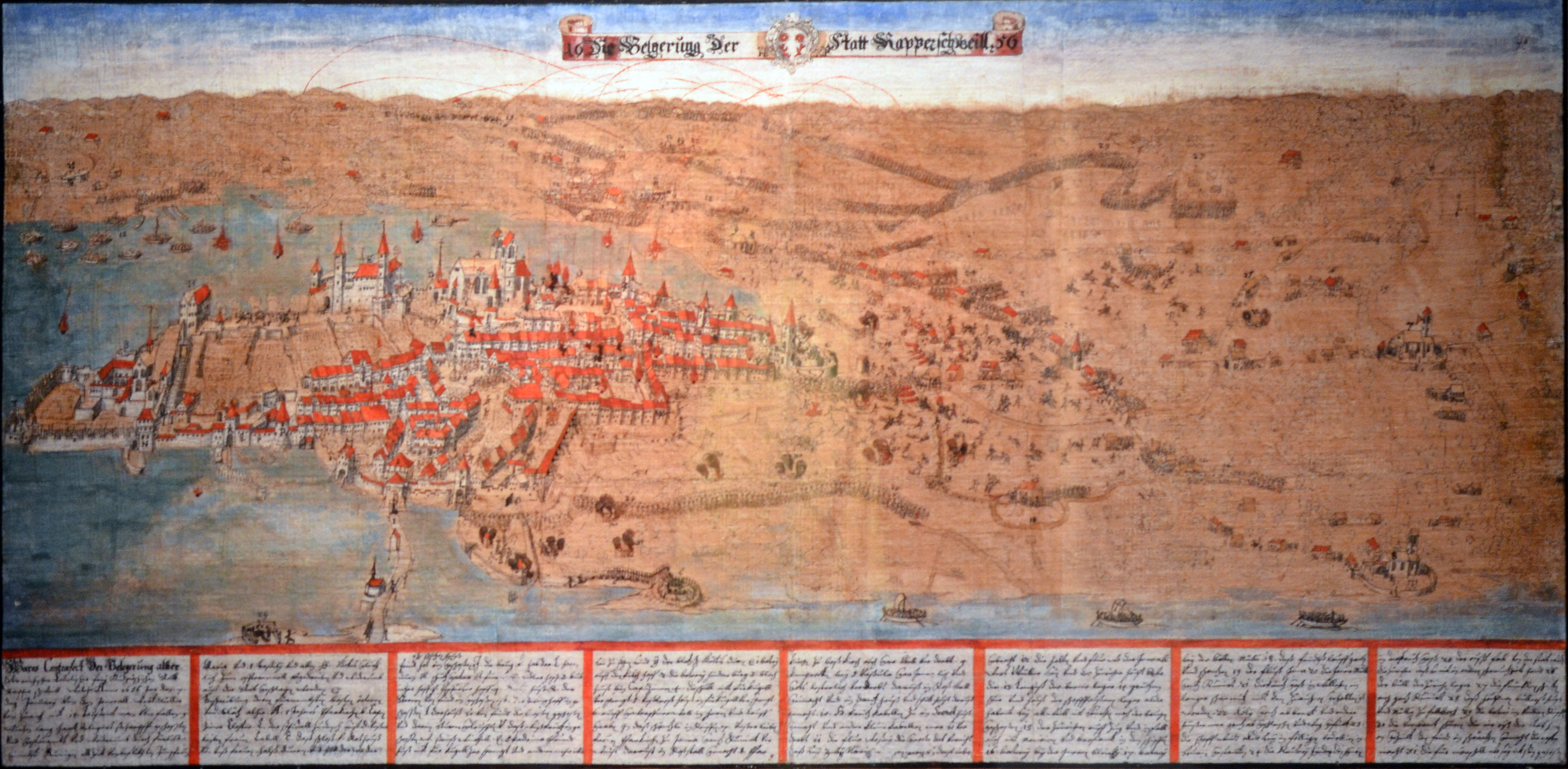
Map of the siege of Rapperswil on a 1662 drawing by Bartholomäus Conrad: "Lower Lake" (or also Zürichsee) to the left, and the lake bridge towards Hurden and Obersee in the foreground

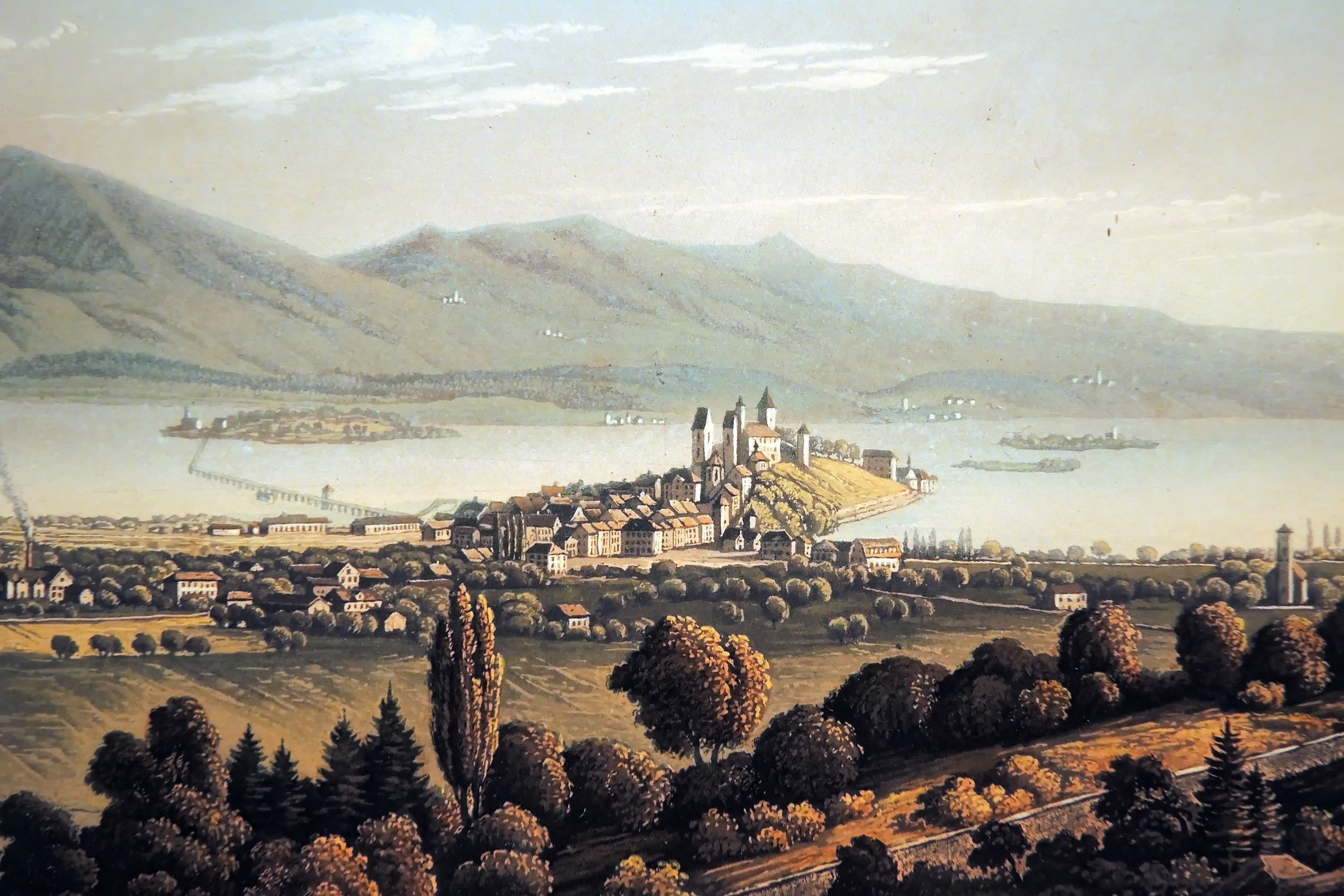
The Seedamm area at Rapperswil and the lake bridge towards Hurden in the middle, the lower parts (or also Zürichsee) of Lake Zurich and the Lützelau and Ufenau islands to the left, Obersee to the right. 1835 painting by an unknown artist as seen from a location on the Meienberg hill between Jona and Rapperswil

"Zürichsee", in certain contexts, refers to the lower (German: Untersee) northwestern section of 68.2 square kilometres (26.3 mi^{2}) of Lake Zurich, or the lake as a whole. While the smaller southeastern upper (German: Obersee) lake area measures 20.8 square kilometres (8.0 mi^{2}), separated by a peninsula (Hurden Peninsula), a glacial moraine (Würm Ice Age) that almost reaches the opposite coast (bridged by the Seedamm causeway which connects Rapperswil with Hurden). Before 1951 the annual water level fluctuated more than 1 metre (3.3 ft), but since then the water level is strictly regulated and therefore between summer and winter differs an average of 40 centimetres (15.7 in). The average lake level is now at 406 metres above sea level, while Obersee and Untersee differ by only 1 centimetre (0.39 in).

The narrow strait between Rapperswil and Hurden was used already about 5,000 years as a historical lake crossing. Since the 1870s a partially artificial road causeway (the Seedamm) and two bridges were added, to cross the most narrow and flatbedded area of the lake, carrying a railway line and road from Rapperswil to Pfäffikon. Seedamm divides the southeastern section of lower Zürichsee and Obersee, connected by the Hurden canal at Hurden, where also the Frauenwinkel protected area is situated. That bigger part of the Zürichsee to the west of the Seedamm, is largely situated in the canton of Zurich, smaller parts in the cantons of Schwyz and St. Gallen (Kempraten and Rapperswil), whilst the upper lake is shared just between the cantons of St. Gallen and Schwyz.

Zürichsee was formed by a glacier and is supplied by the Linth river, which rises in the glaciers of the Glarus Alps. In 1811, the Escher canal was completed, which diverted the Linth river into Walensee (Lake Walen), from where its waters are carried to the east end of Obersee by the Linth canal (completed in 1816), south of Schmerikon. Besides the Linth, other streams that flow into the Obersee are the Jona river (in Rapperswil-Jona), the Wägitaler Aa (in Lachen) and the Schmerikoner Aa (in Schmerikon).

To the south-east, Obersee borders the Buechberg, a Molasse hill. Further to the east are the Appenzell Alps, with the Speer, Chüemettler and Federispitz overlooking the lake. Further south are the Schwyz Alps.

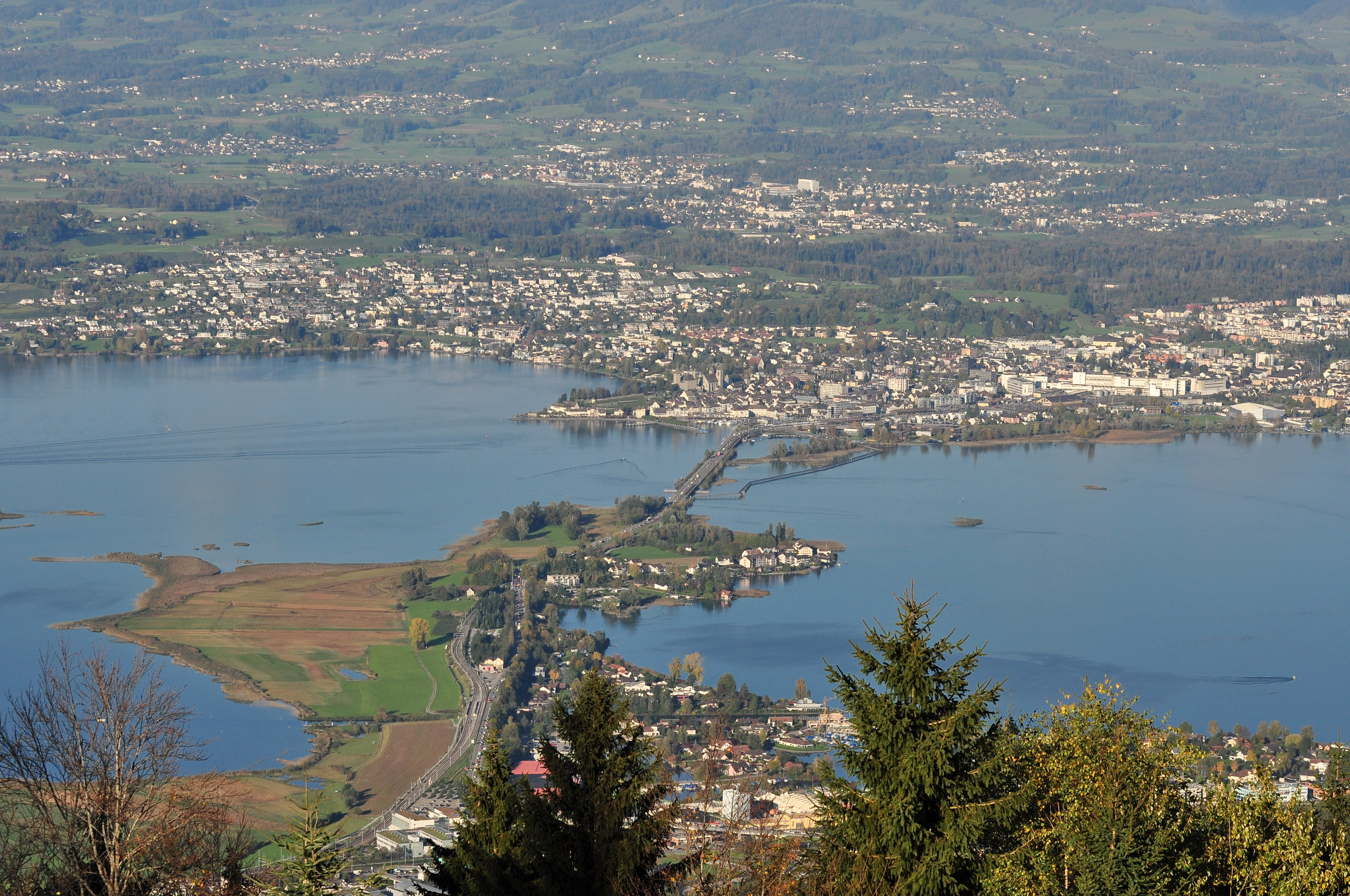
Zürichsee (other part of Lake Zurich) and Obersee divided by the Hurden Peninsula (bridged by the Seedamm causeway), Frauenwinkel wetland in the foreground

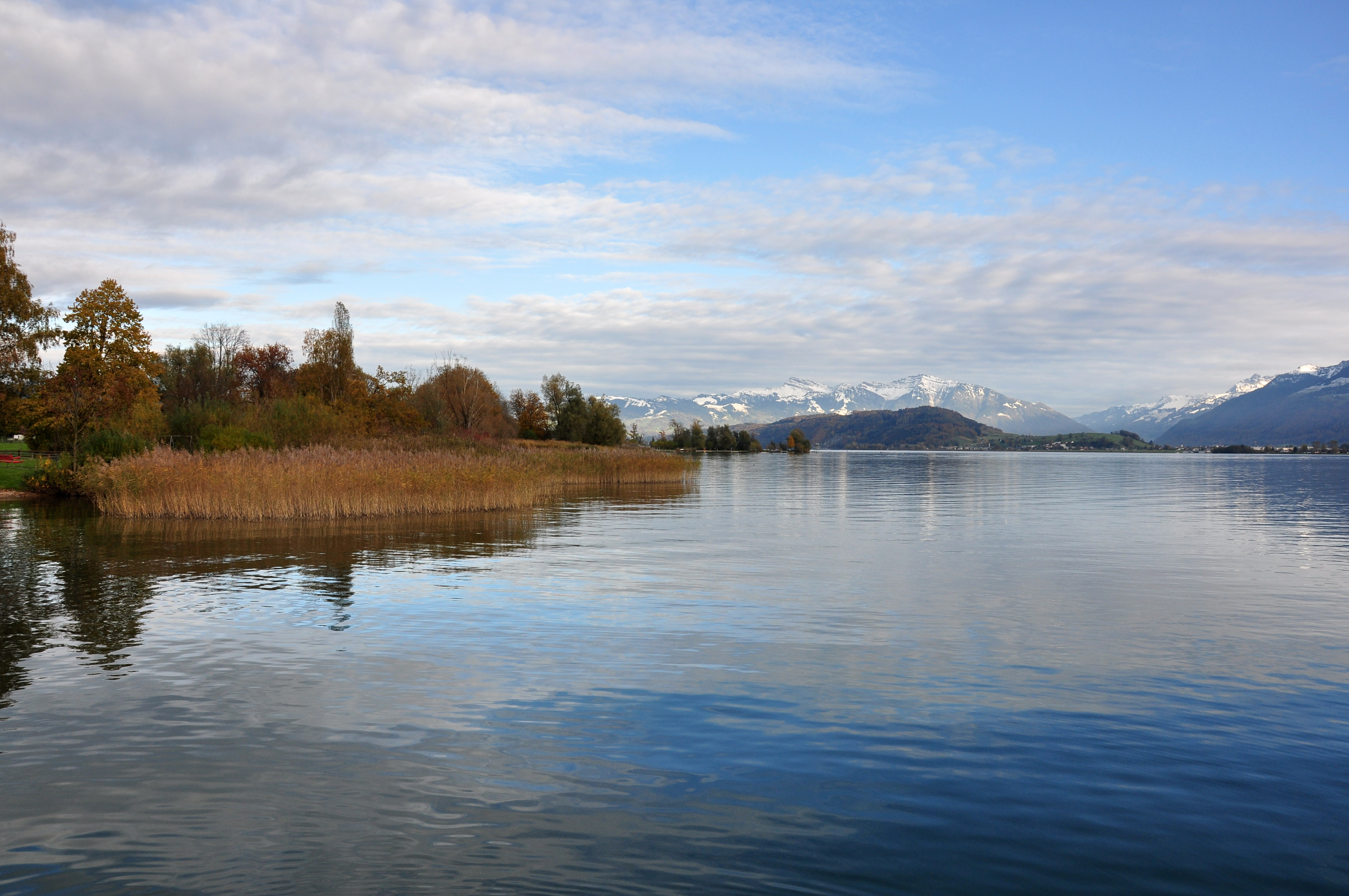
Obersee towards Buechberg

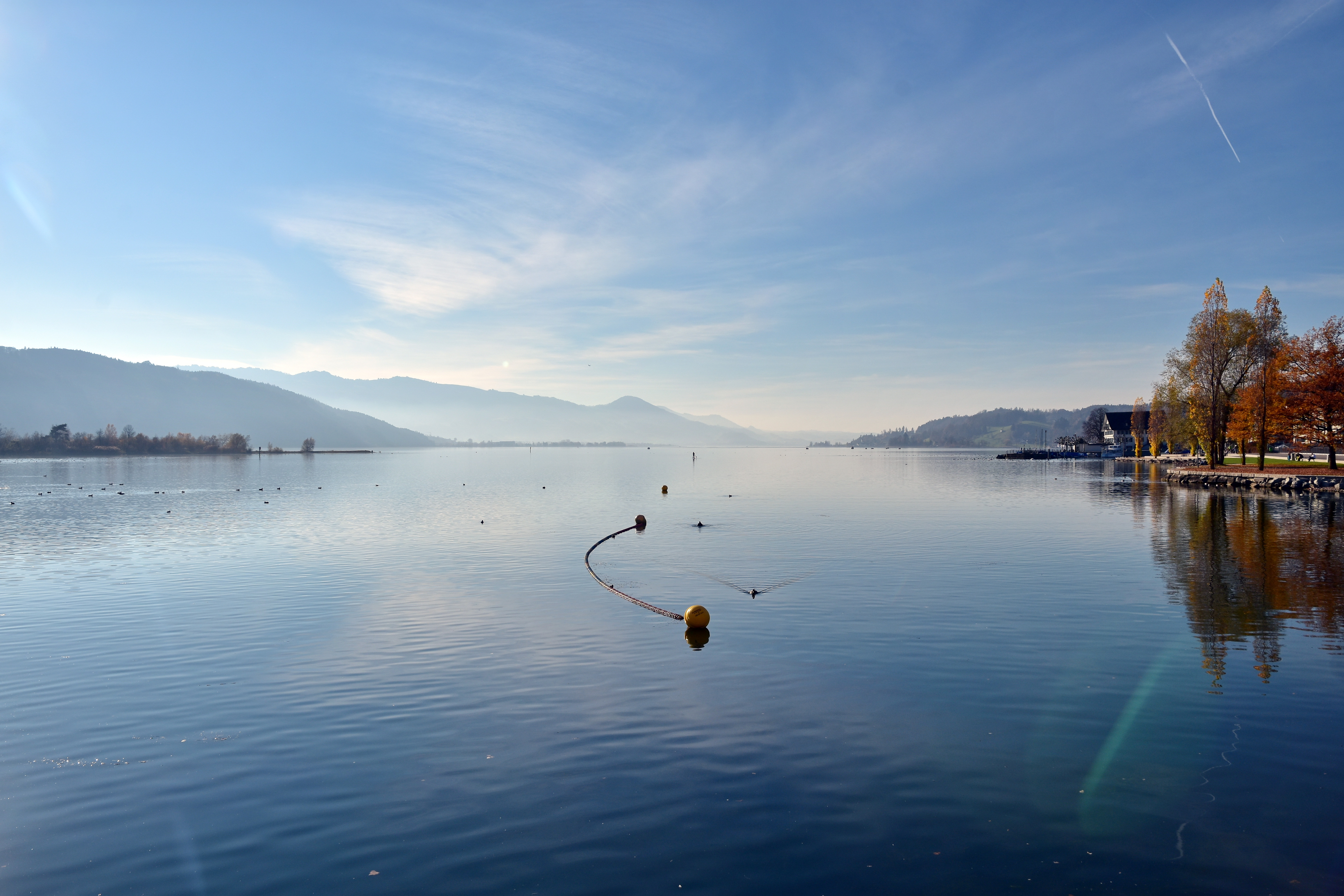
The lake area at Schmerikon

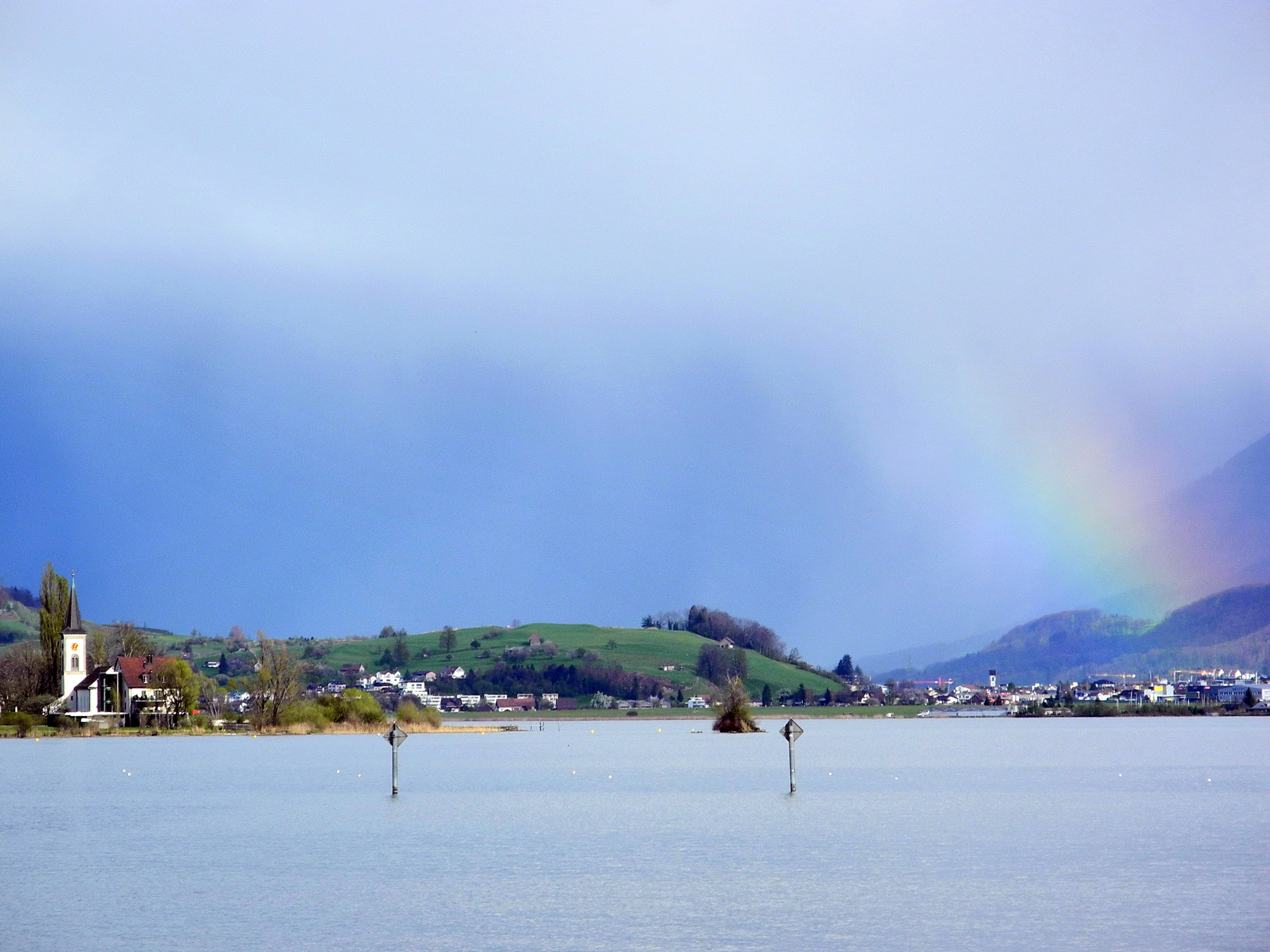
Obersee as seen from the wooden bridge between Rapperswil and Hurden towards the village of Busskirch and the Buechberg hill

== Hydrology ==
Obersee is characterized by its shallow depth and, compared to its volume, by the very large inflow from the Linth canal. The theoretical residence time of water in the upper lake at medium Linth inflow is thus only around 10 weeks. In the near-surface layers of water, a slight upward trend in average temperature has been observed, resulting in the temperature stratification of the lake being more stable much longer into late summer. The increasingly warm winters result in incomplete mixing of lake water to the depths.

The Walensee and Obersee are the main water suppliers for Zürichsee which is used in turn for more than a million inhabitants as drinking water storage. To ensure the quality of the drinking water supply, the water supply authorities of the city of Zurich therefore regularly examine the quality of these two lakes. The neighboring cantons of Zurich, Schwyz, Glarus and St. Gallen participate in the monitoring costs. Since the early 1970s the water quality has greatly improved thanks to extensive restructuring measures. Almost all residents in the 1,564 square kilometres (604 mi^{2}) large catchment area are connected to sewage plants. Although every spring a circulation of the water occurs, often a visible lack of oxygen in July below a depth of 30 metres (98 ft) is observable, which lasts for several months.

== Nature ==
=== Flora ===
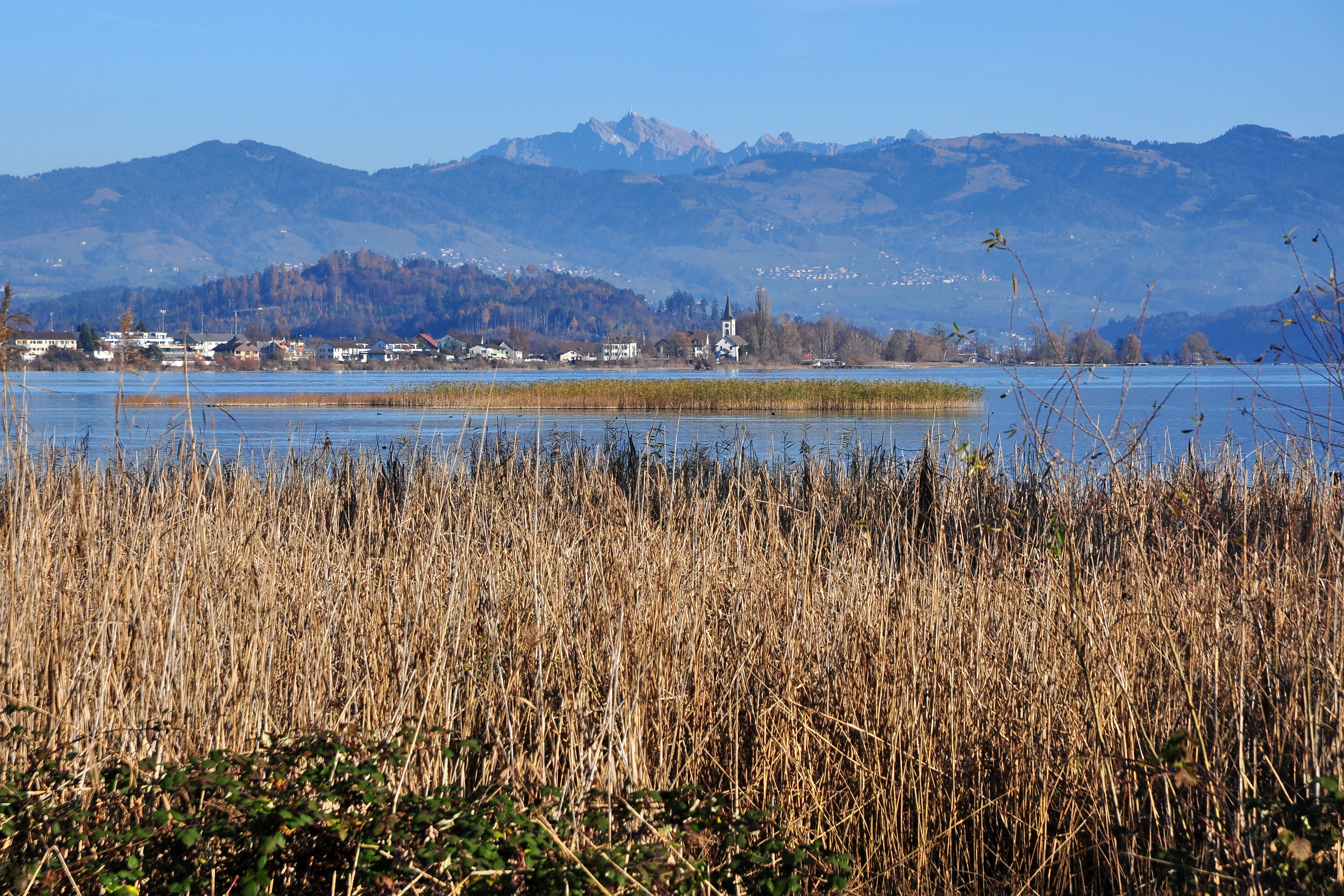
reed belt at Busskirch

Following a 1978 inventory, in 1988 the University of Geneva took a second inventory of aquatic plants in the riparian zone of the entire lake area. The lake shore in the canton of St. Gallen was divided into 50 portions of approximately 500 metres (1,640 ft) in length and described by 12 different parameters. The most important are the plants environmental information on aquatic plants (macrophytes), divided into reeds, floating plants and submerged vegetation (pondweed and stoneworts). The dense vegetation zones are generally between 1 metre (3.3 ft) and 4 metres (13.1 ft) up to 5 metres (16.4 ft) depth. Instead of nutrients, there is a high load with floating mineral particles, which prevents colonization of the sea floor in greater depths. The grade of colonization of the shallow water zone has risen again since the last observation in 1978, which is directly related to the increase in the maximum colonization zone. The vegetation consists four-fifths of submerged plants and only about one-fifth of emerging plants. The latter includes the reedbed: In 1850, 90 hectares (222 acres) of reed beds were alone in the lower lake area. A comparison of aerial photographs from 1954 and 1987 shows in most shore sections of the machining area a significant decrease in the reedbeds. The reed area has increased from 1978 to 1987 in the upper lake from 15 to 16 ha. It can be concluded that the reed banks are mostly declined in the 1960s and 1970s, but that since then at a low level takes place a slight recovery. Lily, as floating leaf plants, covered an area of 0.4 ha (0.99 acres) on the lower lake (Untersee), with a declining trend; in contrast, a doubling to 2 ha (4.9 acres) can be detected on Obersee. Of the 61 species in the entire Zürichsee, 56 colonize the upper lake and 34 the lower lake. Most frequently represented are the pondweed (Potamogeton); 24 species are considered rare, more than 15 very rarely.

=== Fens, open fields and parks ===
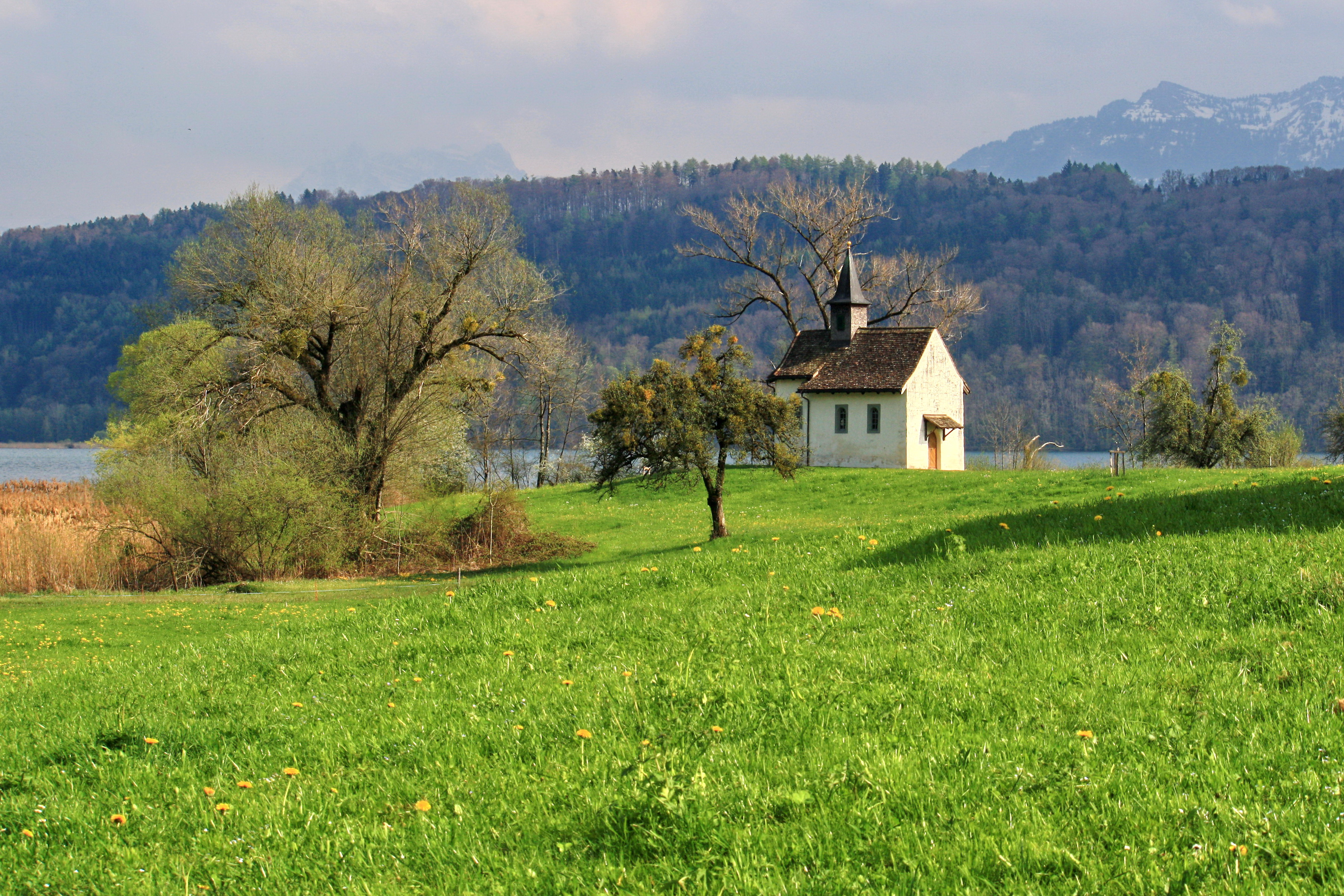
Bollingen peninsula and St. Nicholas Chapel

There are no more original riverside forests on the lake shore, except on steep slopes like the Fuchsberger Horn where a species-rich forest with oak and pine trees breeds. Also worth mentioning is the small wooded area at the far end of the upper Bollingen peninsula. Outside of urban areas, the bank is often planted with different density and broad trees stocks. Extensive shore sections are occupied by large, private gardens and parks. Although often non-native and exotic shrubs and tree species occur and the lawns usually are intensively cultivated, the upstream water habitats often form relatively low-noise buffer areas to the underlying recreation, transport and settlement areas. At several banks sections agricultural meadows and pastures directly to the water. However, the upper Bollingen peninsula is the only major agricultural area with lake access. All remaining grasslands have less than 50 metres (164 ft) lake access and are usually relatively little interference. A disadvantage often is the missing, extensively used transition to riparian vegetation.

=== Geotopes ===
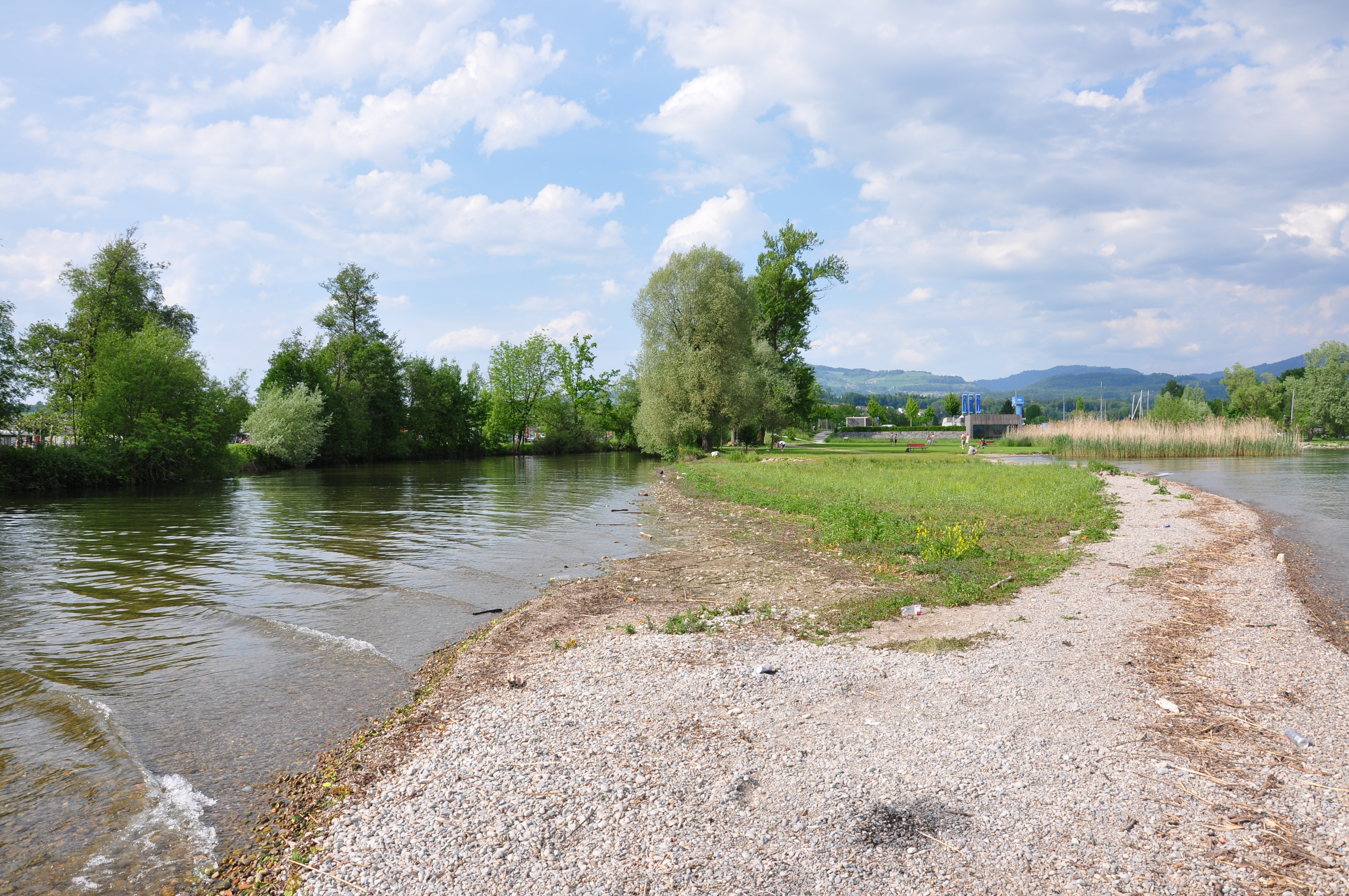
Stampf area, mouth of the Jona

Geotopes comprise geological outcrops, boulders and river delta formations. Geological rock outcrops, i.e. scenically striking rocky ridges are found in Fuchsberg and Stafflen in Jona, Heilig Hüsli in Rapperswil and the Hörnli glacial erratic in Oberbollingen. Extensive river deltas included that of the Jona and Schmerikoner Aa (Aabach), to a lesser degree of Sägenbächlein, Wagner and Lehholz in Jona and the Linth with side channels in Schmerikon.

=== Fauna ===
==== Birds ====
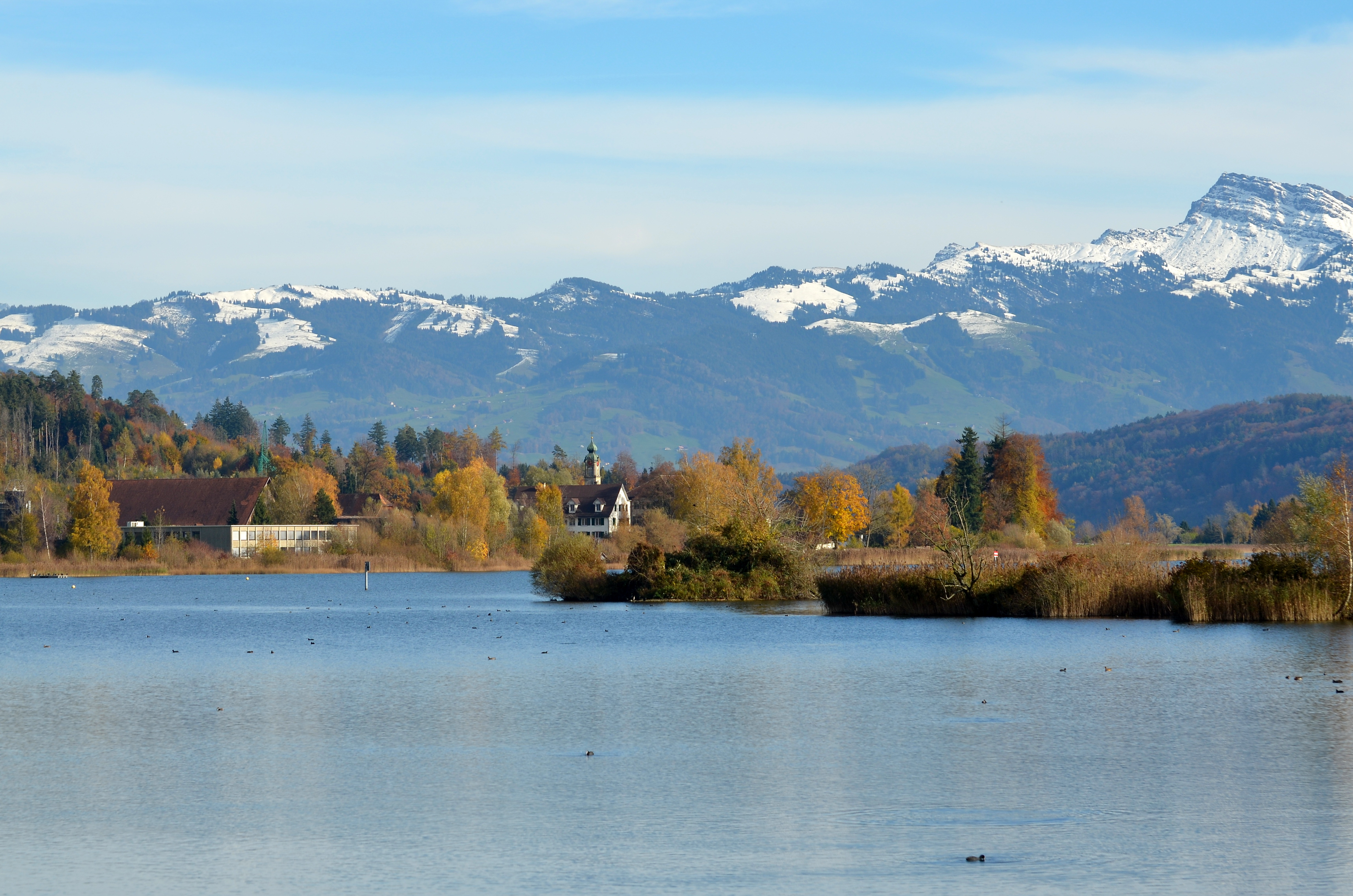
Wurmsbach reeds

Perennial systematic birdwatching and studies illustrate the importance of reed beds as an outstanding habitat for many bird species. Among the 15 most valuable ornithological reeds on Obersee include Rapperswil Strandweg (rank 4), Bollingen Unter Stafflen (rank 7), Wurmsbach bay (rank 11), Wurmsbach nunnery (rank 12), and Schmerikoner Allmeind (rank 13) in the canton St. Gallen. The extensive area of shallow water with its diverse flora and the still widespread shore trees play an extremely important role for many bird species, both as food, breeding and resting place. A critical phase in the life of birds is the time of moulting, during which they are more or less incapable of flying and depending on quiet water areas. The Reed warblers inhabit the seaward edges of the reed belts and need significantly more space than other reed birds. Due to the decline of the reed banks and the increase in interference from recovery operations and water sports on the lake shore, the number of breeding pairs is constantly decreasing. Today the Great reed warbler is acutely threatened. According to the Red List of endangered species in Switzerland, it is listed in the top risk category of disappearing birds whose survival in Switzerland is unlikely if the threats continue. In the Obersee area, there are three important resting places of waders: Joner Allmeind annually depending on the water level in spring and autumn, Rapperswil in winter. and Schmerikoner Allmeind in spring and autumn. For some northern European birds, such as the common eider, the lake is a wintering area.

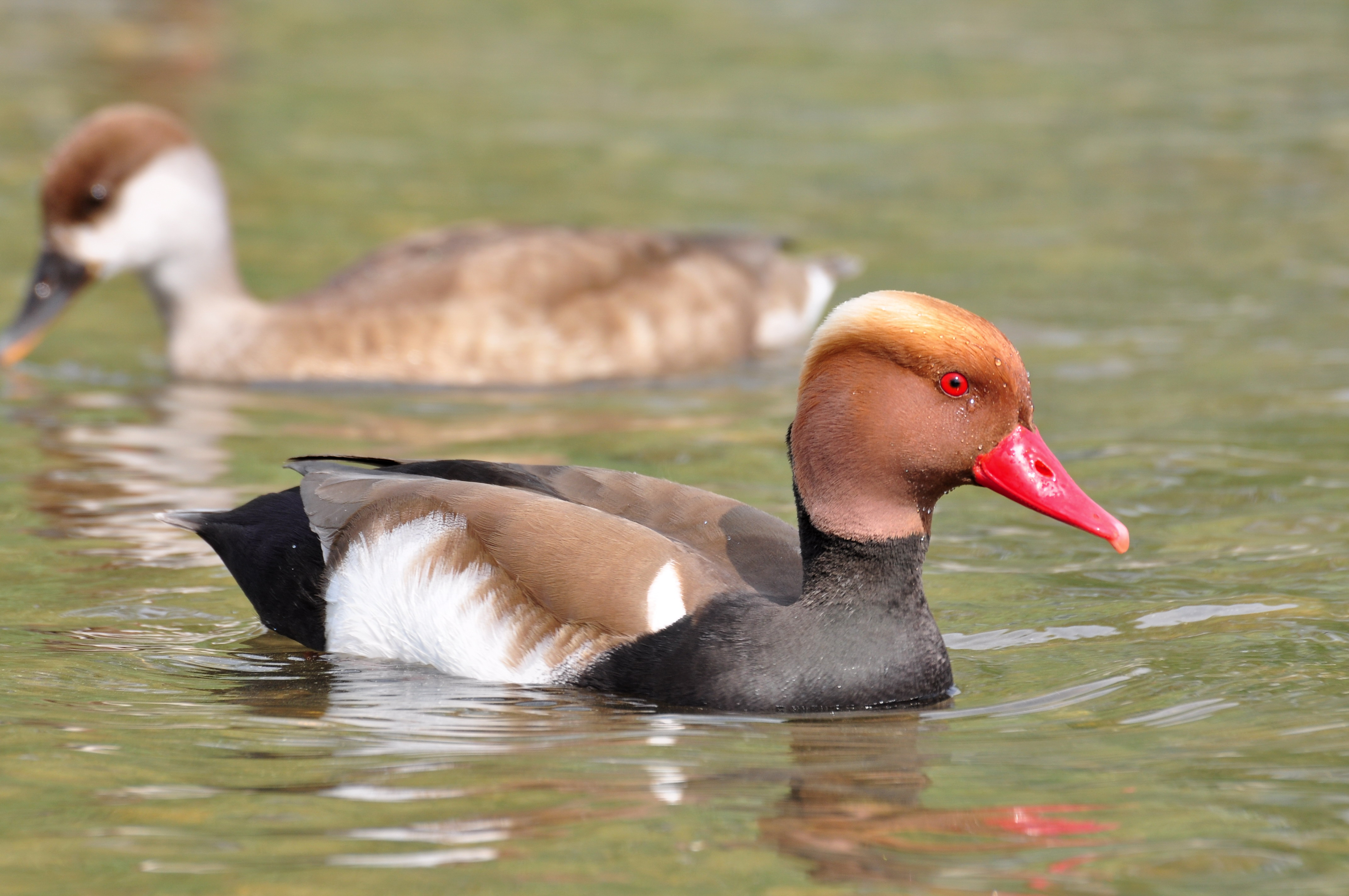
Netta rufina at the mouth of the Jona (Stampf)

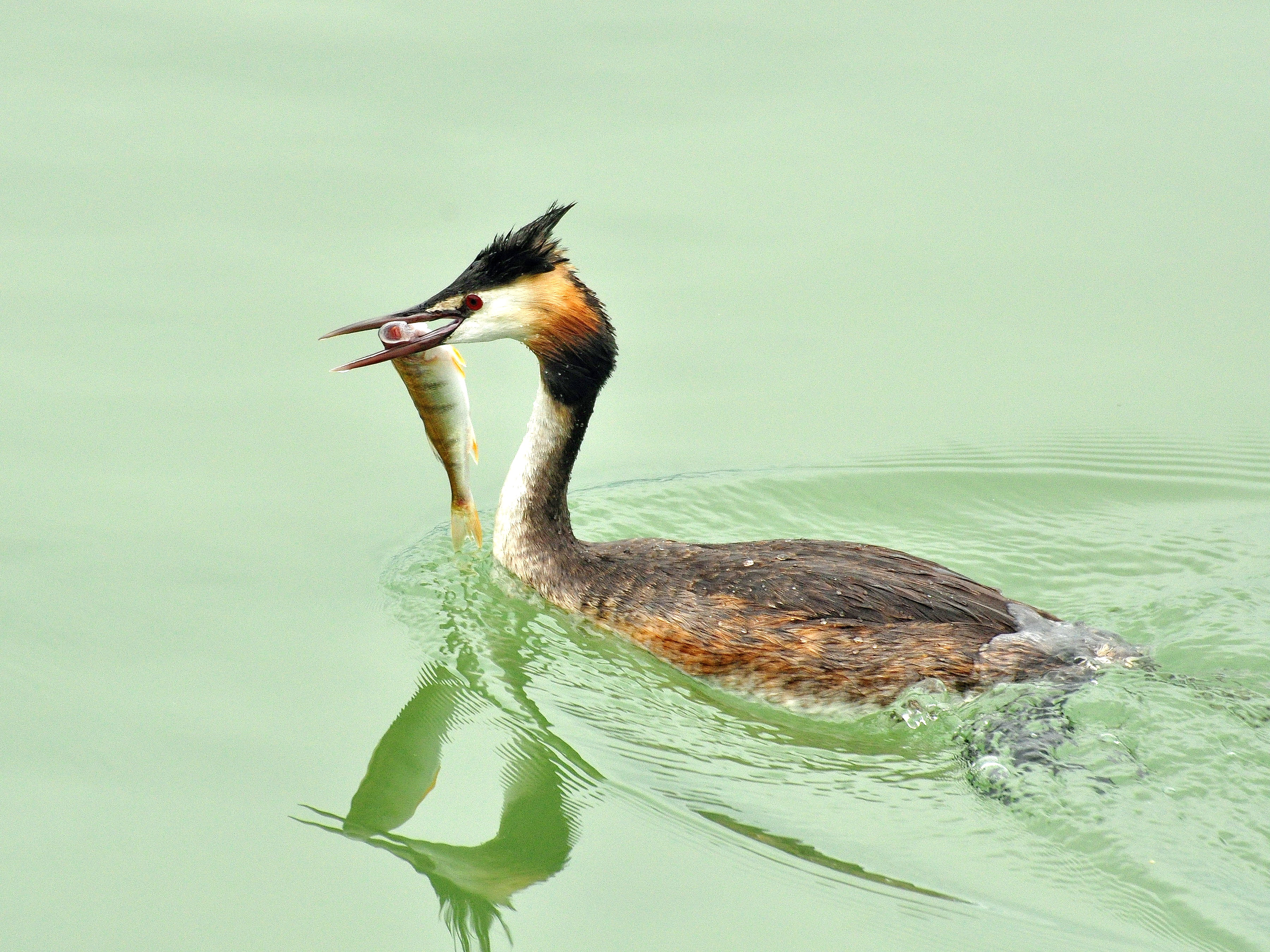
Podiceps cristatus and its prey, alongside the lake bridge crossing near Hurden

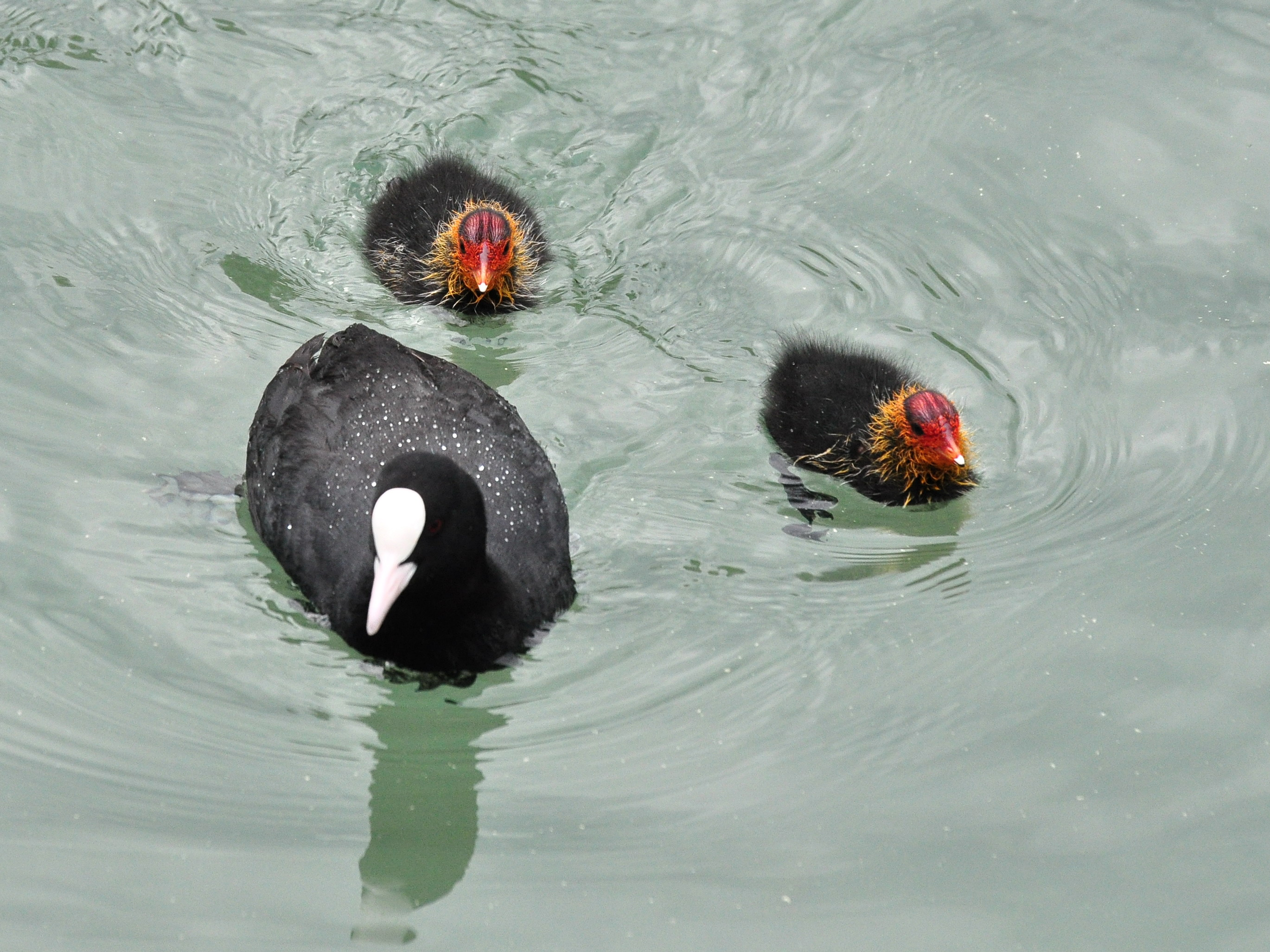
Fulica atra with two chicks near the Holzbrücke Rapperswil–Hurden

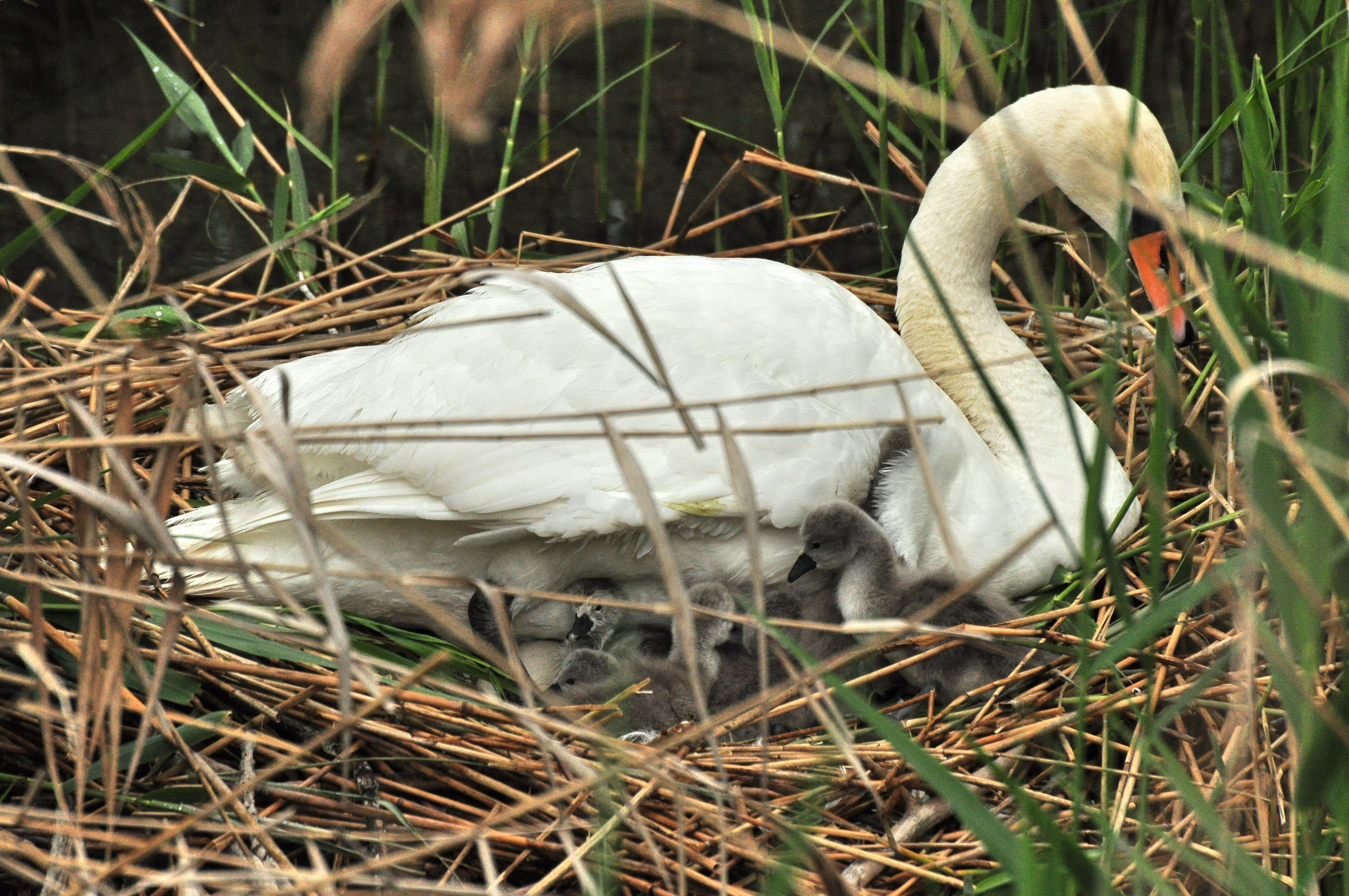
Cygnus olor with chicks near the Holzbrücke Rapperswil–Hurden

==== Amphibians ====
Many amphibian species are dependent on both natural waters for spawning, as well as on adjacent food and wintering areas. Because the connection between these two partial habitats is interrupted by settlement patterns and transport systems, the amphibians have declined in these landscapes. With regard to a cross-linking of priority areas by the lake with the backlands, the most important amphibian spawning areas have been identified in 1997. Amphibian spawning areas of national importance are situated at the Allmeind areas in Jona and Schmerikon. At the Joner Allmeind two endangered species on the Red List (Yellow-bellied toad and Pelophylax) can be found in large to very large populations. Schmerikoner Allmeind is home to the same two endangered species. For both areas the preservation and promotion of natural corridors are required, and in Schmerikon along the Linth and the side channels a large-scale networking with Kaltenbrunner Riet and other protected areas in the Linthebene region.

==== Fish stocks ====
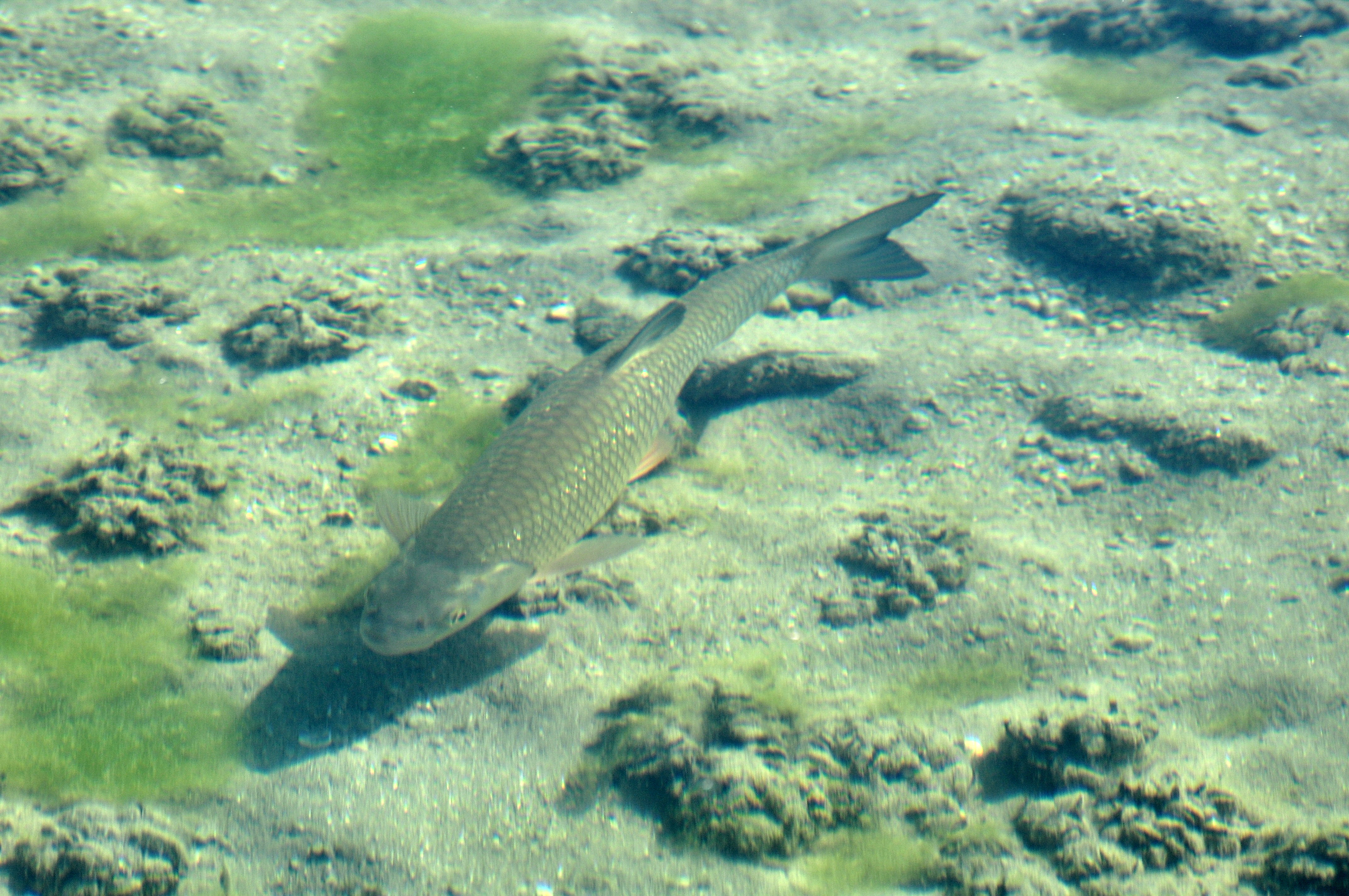
Common nase near the Holzbrücke Rapperswil–Hurden

The few existing inventory data are compiled by the competent fisheries overseer respectively a report in 1993. This is a rough, spatially highly generalized statement to the spawning grounds of the Northern pike and Coregonus (C. zugensis, commonly C. albeli). In addition to these specific fishing information, ecological data and studies on the other species of fish and their habitat requirements, but also to invertebrates, such as crabs and mussels, is missing.

== Protected areas ==
=== Fens and moors ===
For the inventory of the national fen asset protection zones, the canton of St. Gallen evaluated and proposed, in accordance with the provisions in the national fen regulation, appropriate buffer zones, among them as fens of national importance: the lakeshore marshes west of Busskirch, Joner Allmeind marshes, the lakeside reed area east of Wurmsbach, the reed at Schmerikon and the reed area in front of HSR area and Knie's Kinderzoo in Rapperswil-Jona. Fens of regional and local importance include the reed area east of the Busskirch church, the reed area south of Hessenhof, the small area at the parking side of the Jona mouth (Stampf), the embankment and so-called Kormoraninsel (lit. 'Cormorant island') at Stampf, as well as the bay to the west of the upper Bollingen peninsula.

=== Seedamm–Heilighüsli ===
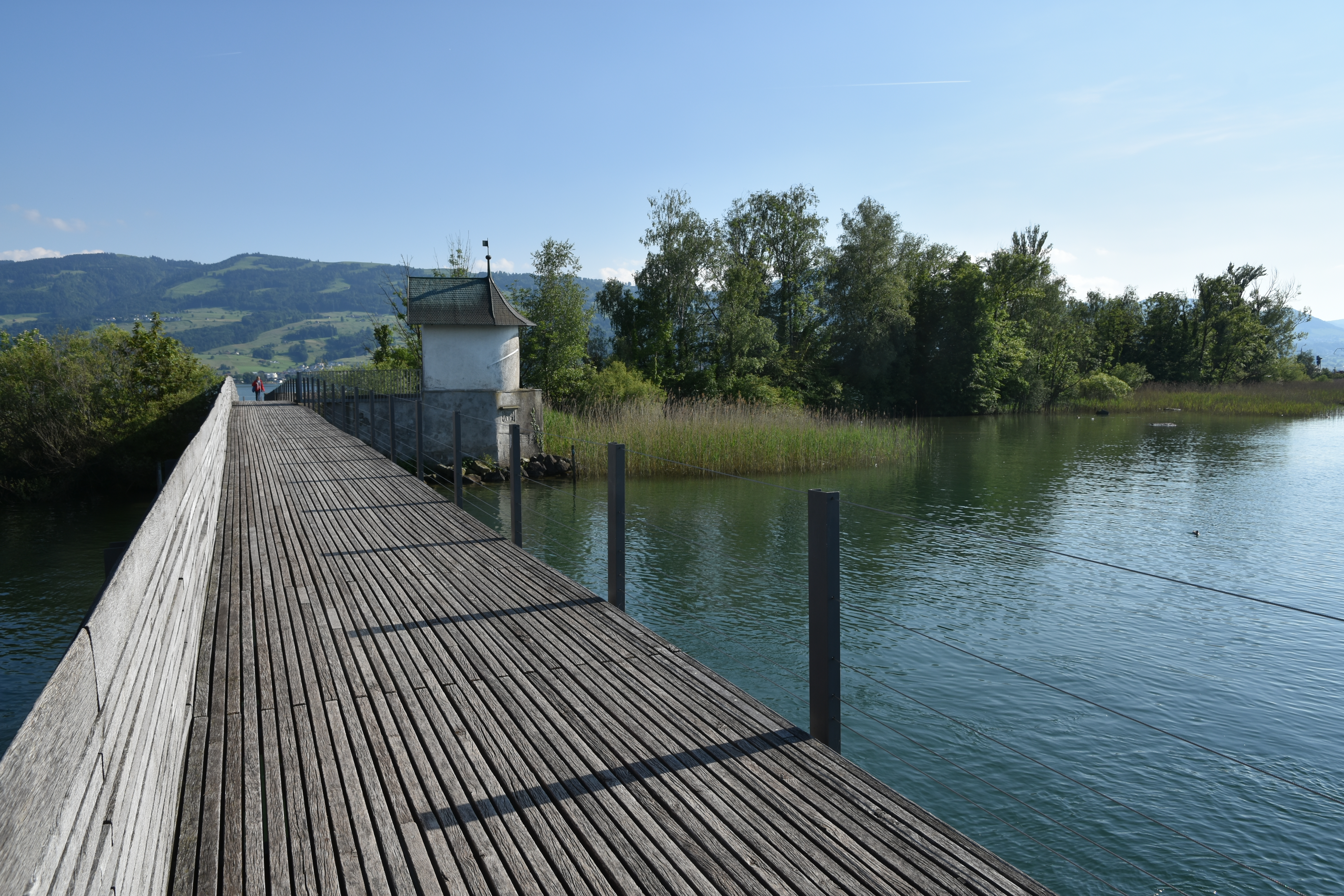
Heilig Hüsli lake islands as seen from Holzbrücke Rapperswil-Hurden

After the Seedamm causeway was built in 1878, the Heilig Hüsli chapel was the only remaining structure of the prehistoric and medieval lake crossings. It stood isolated in the lake and was not accessible to visitors until the reconstruction of the former wooden bridge was erected in 2001. The lake and the small islands between the chapel, the timber piles of the Rapperswil–Hurden bridge and the Seedamm are designated as a nature reserve. Together with an artificial island made of gravel, they form one of the most important waterfowl breeding areas. For this reason, fishing from the wooden bridge is prohibited, as are swimming and mooring boats in the area. Among the area around the Seedamm lake crossing and between Rapperswil and Busskirch, there are some more protected areas.

=== Frauenwinkel ===
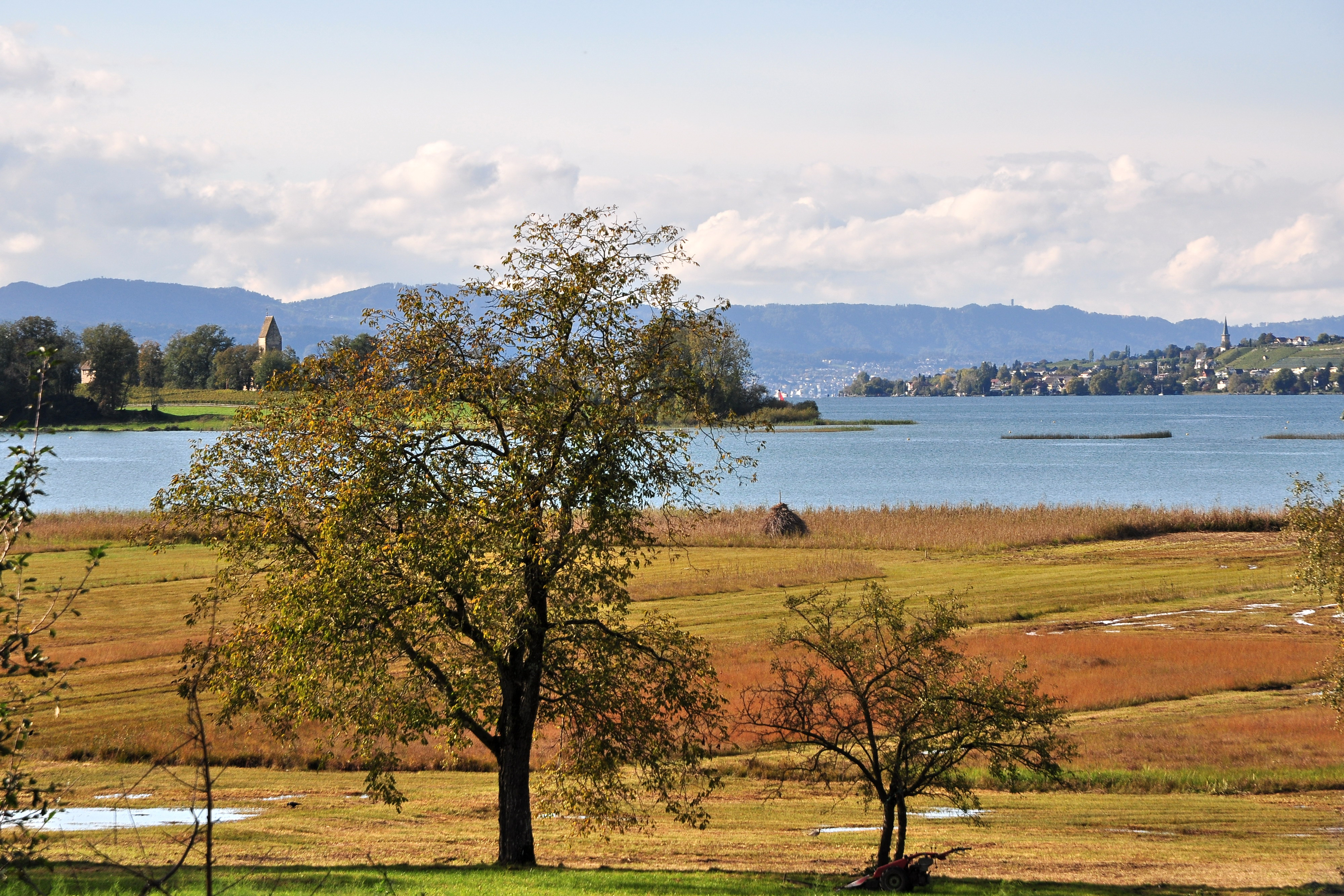
Frauenwinkel protected area, Ufenau island and Zimmerberg in the background

The Frauenwinkel protected area is situated on the Hurden Peninsula in the canton of Schwyz. Its reed and marsh belt has a maximal width of about 1 kilometre (0.6 mi) from the west to the east and a length of about 1.5 kilometres (0.9 mi) from the north to the south. The lake area towards Lützelau and Ufenau islands it also part of the protected area of about 3.5 kilometres (2.2 mi). Landward, there is reed vegetation with large and small sedge flora, rushes, Iris sibirica, and the rare Gentiana pneumonanthe. In certain places even transition and high marsh occurs. In the nature reserve there are European rarities, among them Phengaris alcon, Eurasian curlew and Gentiana pneumonanthe, as well as Ruspolia nitidula.

=== Nuoler Ried ===
Nuoler Ried is a reed located on the north end of a large plane that was filled by the Wägitaler Aa and Spreitenbach streams. This delta is larger than those of Frauenwinkel or of the Jona river and Wurmsbach stream. The present marshes only comprise a small fraction of the formerly extensive, extensively used reed and meadows which offered numerous animals and plants a wide habitat. Larger areas of the present nature reserve, such as the so-called Schüttinsel, were created on the deposits of non-recyclable residual material from the nearby gravel extraction.

=== Schmerikoner Ried ===
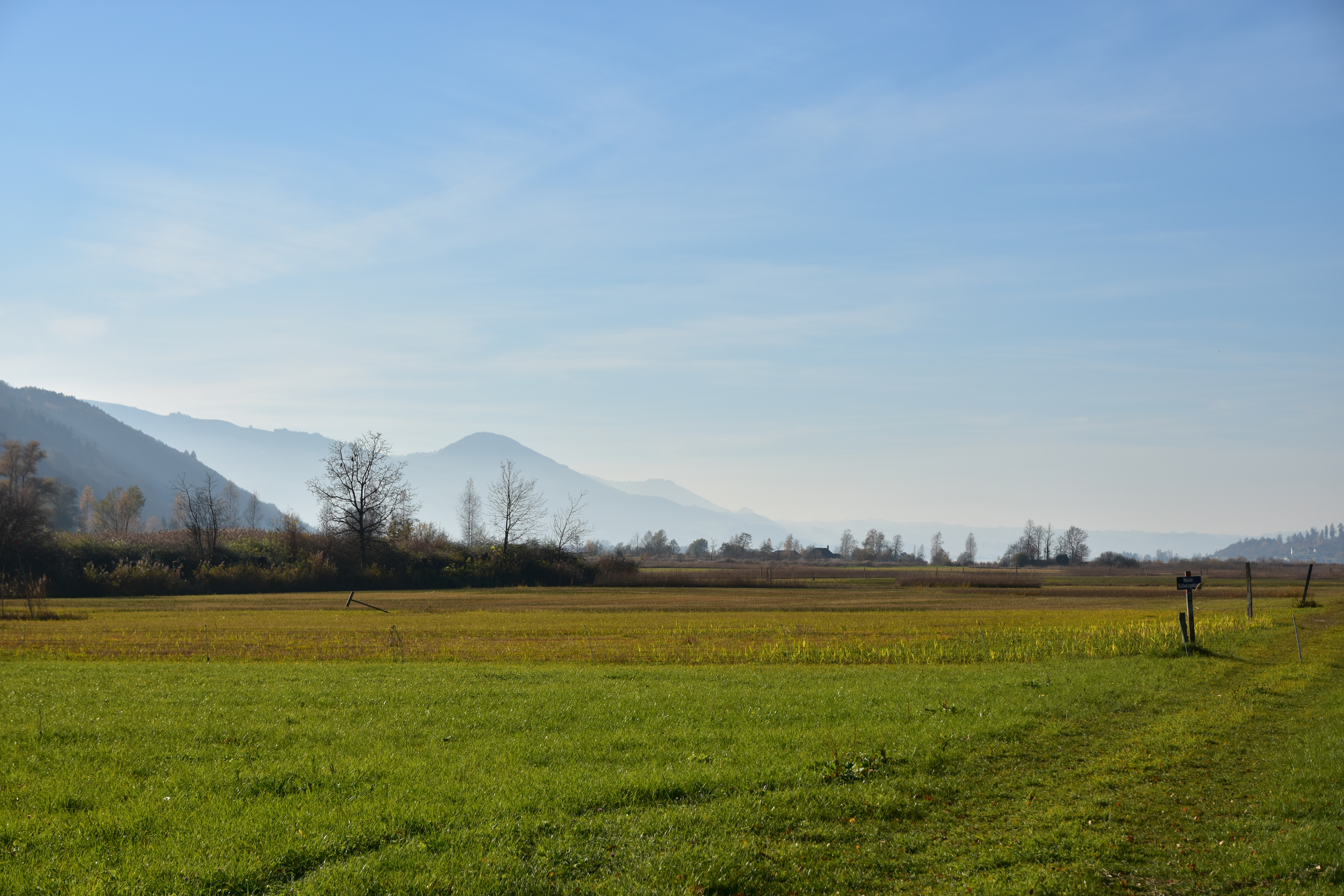
Schmerikoner Ried

The Schmerikoner Ried (Schmerikon reedbed) is a reed located on the northeastern lake shore in the Linthebene area towards the Grynau Castle. The protected area was set under federal protection as a low-moor bog of national importance (German: Bundesinventar der Flachmoore von nationaler Bedeutung) in 1994.

=== Güntliweid–Bätzimatt (Buechberg) ===
On the southwestern side, between Grynau Castle and Lachen there is namely the bird reserves of national importance Güntliweid up to Bätzimatt at Buechberg. The reserve is located on the south lake shore, at the foothills of Buechberg, and extends from the south of Bätzimatt at Schmerikon to Güntliweid east of Lachen. It is considered as a particularly valuable resting place for waders, and may be obtained as resting place for waders on their migration, although there is a quarry that mines Bollinger Sandstein.

== Lakeshore settlements ==
List of localities at Obersee (from east to west)
Left shore ¹	Right shore
Wangen (SZ); Nuolen; Lachen (SZ); Altendorf (SZ); Freienbach (SZ); Hurden	Schmerikon (SG); Rapperswil-Jona (SG); Bollingen; Busskirch; Jona; Rapperswil
Notes: ¹ Left shore from the entry of the Linth River, i.e. the south shore, which gradually becomes the west shore. Cantons: SZ, SG.

== Transport ==
=== Boat ===
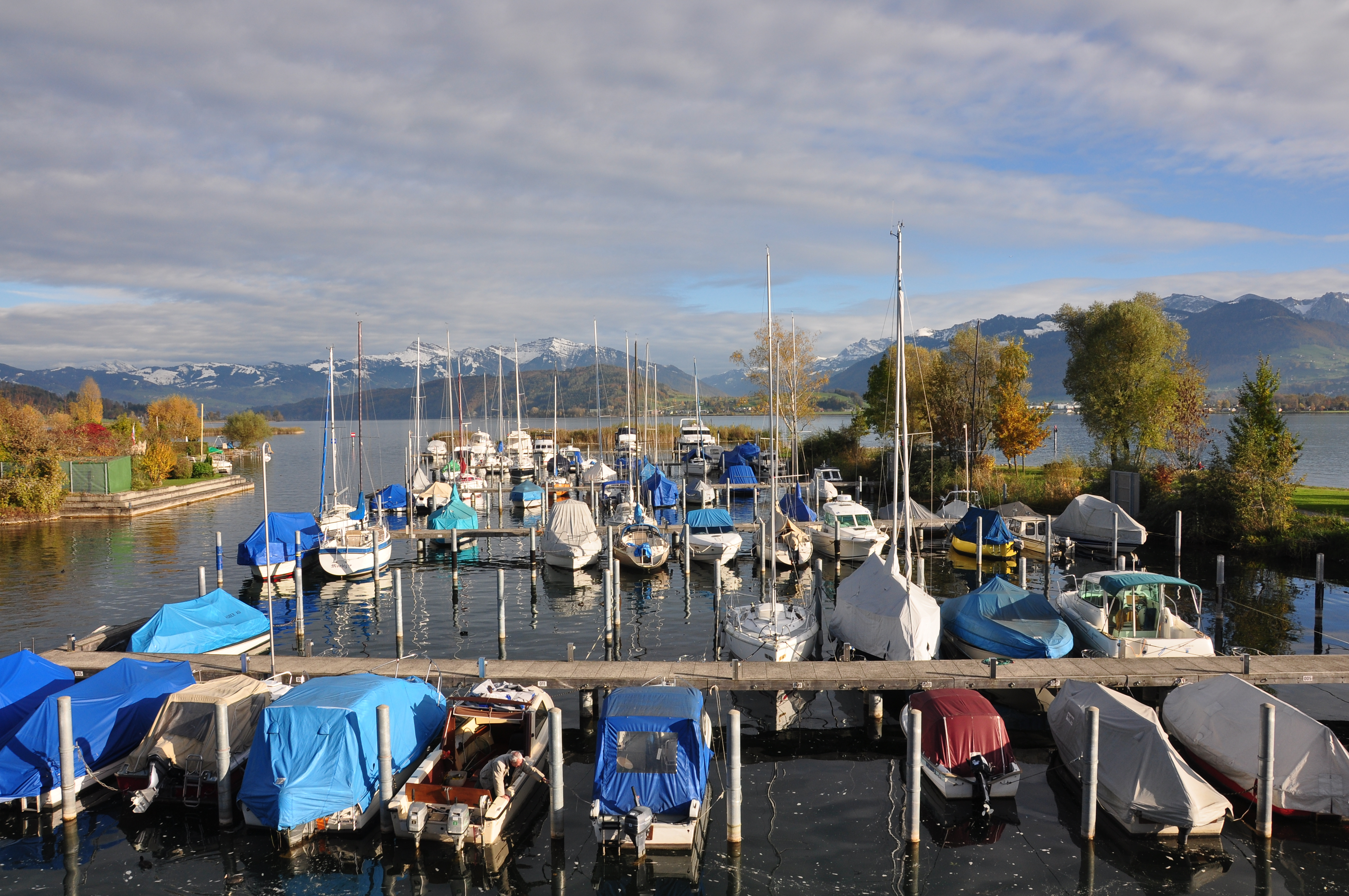
Marina in Jona

The Zürichsee-Schifffahrtsgesellschaft (ZSG) – the Lake Zurich Navigation Company – provides with its 17-passenger ships touristic services on Lake Zurich and also on Obersee, as well as the much smaller Hensa AG, based in Rapperswil. During warmer seasons, there is a ferry (Oberseefähre) between Rapperswil (HSR), Altendorf and Lachen. Boat services on Obersee operate within fare zones 182 and 183 of the Zürcher Verkehrsverbund (ZVV).

The boat density on the lake is by far the highest in Switzerland: around 3,000 private boats (1.44 boats per hectare) according to studies of 1978/79 and 1.21 boats per hectare in 1972 on an area of 20.8 square kilometres (8.0 mi^{2}) resulting in considerable disturbances to wildlife and the riparian vegetation by the private boat traffic (in addition to the nearby air traffic).

=== Rail and Bus ===
Rail transport over the Seedamm is provided by Zurich S-Bahn lines S5 and S40, and along the northern shore by St. Gallen S-Bahn services S4, S6 and S17 and the Voralpen-Express, although just a handful of railway stations are present, such as Hurden, Rapperswil, Blumenau and Schmerikon (Bollingen is closed since 2004). The line along the southern lake shore connecting Pfäffikon SZ, Altendorf, Lachen and Siebnen-Wangen in the canton of Schwyz, is provided by the Zurich S-Bahn lines S2, S8 and S25, IR35 and long-distance services that do not call at stations within the region. Buses are operated on both sides of the lake by the local Postauto providers and on the northeastern shore by the Verkehrsbetriebe Zürichsee und Oberland, respectively, in addition to local buses in Rapperswil-Jona. Trains operate within the fare zones of ZVV, and Tarifverbund Ostwind, respectively.

=== Airfield ===
The private airfield Wangen-Lachen is located inmidst the protected area Nuoler Ried on the southern shore of the lake. The adjacent nature reserve Wägitaler Aa is a breeding ground paradise for various rare species of birds. In 1949 a private pilot, a flight instructor and the aviation pioneer Alfred Comte entered into a lease agreement with the Genossame (cooperative) Wangen. On 29 June 1950 for the first time a plane landed on the grass runway of the airfield. Since 1957 also seaplanes use the lake shore area, being today – the Ad Astra Aero airport at Zürichhorn was closed around 1931 – the last water airfield in Switzerland. The airfield track has been paved in 1967, and the airport is equipped with a VASI approach aid.

== Tourism and recreation ==
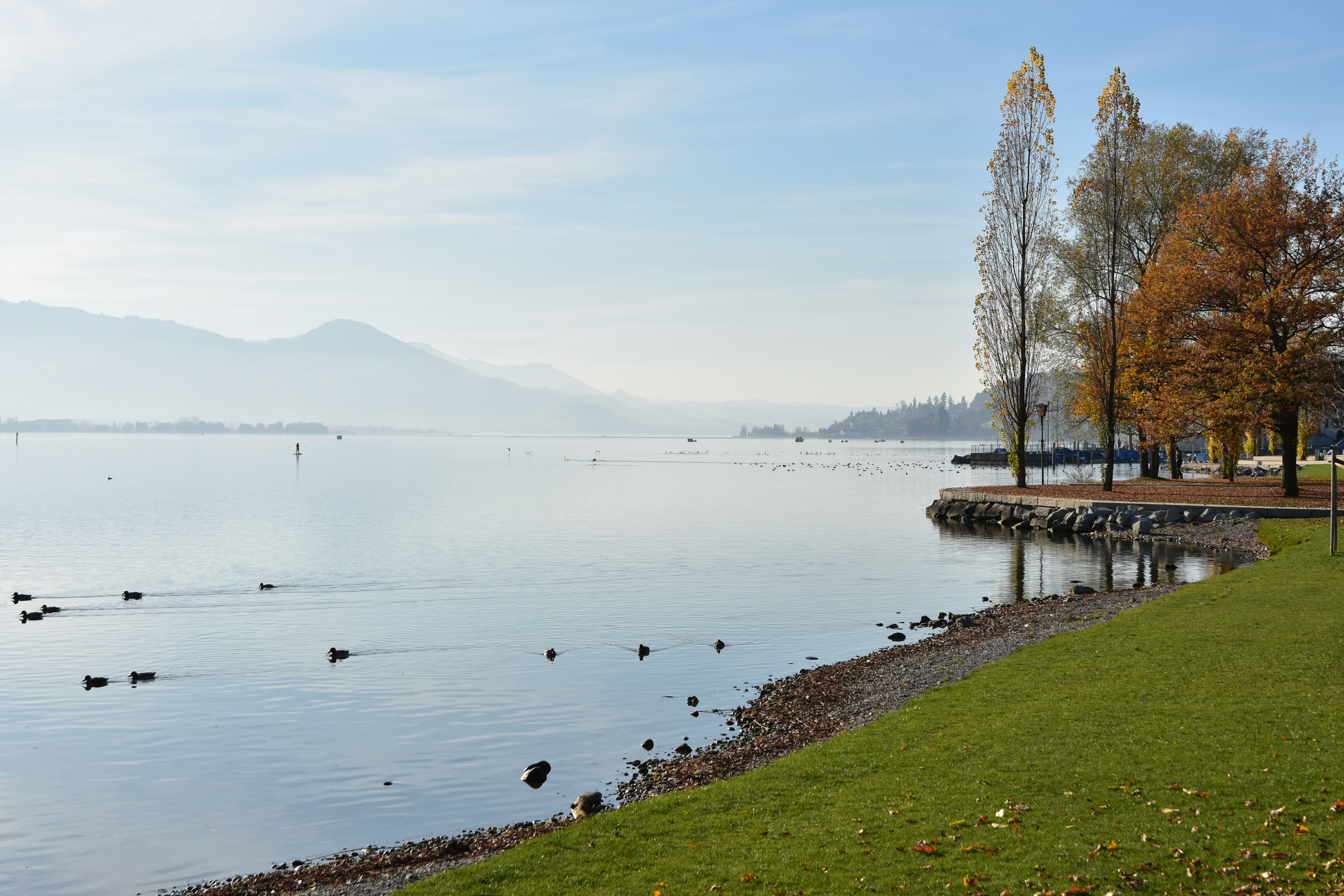
Lido at Schmerikon

The pathway between Rapperswil-Jona and Schmerikon, passing by Bollingen Tower, and the wooden bridge in the Seedamm area are very popular for hiking and there are also cycling routes. Also, the 'fishing village' Hurden is often frequented by tourists. Knie's Kinderzoo, the old town of Rapperswil and its castle, Busskirch, Wurmsbach Abbey and Bollingen, situated in Rapperswil-Jona, are other points of interests on the northern lake shore. From Tuggen, there's also a historical road heading from the former granary at the Grynau Castle over the Buechberg hill towards Siebnen. In general, the southern side of the lake is not as developed for tourism, although the Lachen lido is very popular. On the southern lakeside, there is also a shopping mall (Seedamm-Center). Also often frequented is the lido of Schmerikon at the Linth canal's estuary.

=== Disturbance of wildlife and riparian vegetation by extensive recreational use ===
Disturbance sensitive species are those which have a large flight distance, such as grebes and little grebes, common moorhen, water rail, gadwall and tufted duck. These animals leave their habitat rapidly and in disorder, either not returning or returning with some delay, only after elimination of the fault. The flight distance when passing motor and sailing boats can be up to 500 metres (1,640 ft). During the plumage change, frequent disruptions for waterfowl can have deadly consequences. Also important are the widest possible retreat as cover for frightened animals.

Many of the most attractive shore landscapes of Zürichsee are located in the section of the canton of St. Gallen. Accordingly, there is a rush of boats from the lower lake area, i.e. west of the Seedamm causeway, on nice summer days. The environmentally sensitive Wurmsbach bay is a popular anchoring and bathing place, which represents a potential failure and thus a conflict with the high value of the shore habitats. Disorders also produce sport canoeists, leisure boats and surfboards that circulate too close to the shore. Very vulnerable with respect to disturbances mentioned are the valuable shore sections on both sides of the harbour at the Rapperswil lido. Therefore, the marinecontrol regulations prohibit to motorboats shore independent movements within the 150 metres (492 ft) zone and slow driving within the 300 metres (984 ft) zone. For sailboats and motorboats, a minimum distance of 25 metres (82 ft) from reeds and water lilies when anchoring and sailing. Individual bank sections are marked with yellow buoys, which means that these zones are closed to all vessels. The maritime police's mission is to enforce these rules.

== Bollingen Sandstone ==
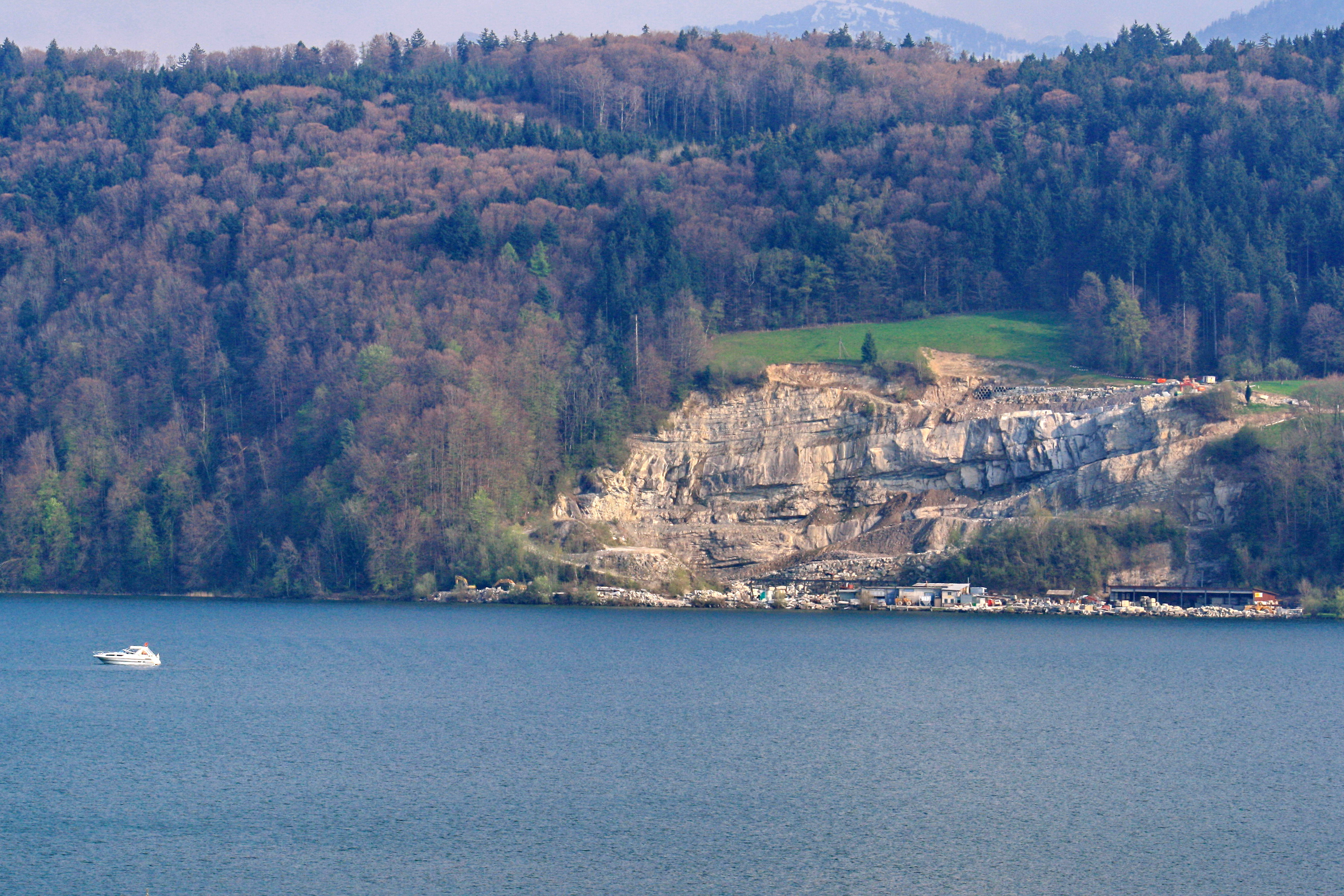
Bollingen Sandstone quarry at Buechberg as seen from Bollingen

The Bollinger Sandstein (Bollingen Sandstone) is a sandstone found on Obersee lake shore, namely between Bollingen and Uznach and the Buechberg area, in the cantons of St. Gallen and Schwyz. Depending on the layer, the appearance and texture of the natural stone also varies, therefore distinct names have developed at the different mining locations: Güntliweid, Buechberg and Uznaberg. Bollinger-Lehholz sandstone is mined between Jona and Bollingen. Since the incidence even partly is mined within the Güntliweid–Bätzimatt nature reserve, Bollingen sandstone usually is extracted with wire saws that cut the stone vertically in up to 60 metres (197 ft) deep shafts. For example, the present Lehholz quarry dates back to 1252 AD when Rudolf II von Rapperswil founded the nearby Wurmsbach Abbey in Jona. It was transferred with oxen to the lake shore transshipping point to be shipped with so-called Ledi boats towards the present Sechsläutenplatz Zurich far into the 19th century. Particularly the present municipality of Zurich used the Bollingen quarries for the construction of countless public and private buildings, for example, the cathedral towers and the city fortifications, or the Zunfthaus zur Meisen that was built in 1757 with stone from the Buechberg quarry. It was also used for the Fraumünster and Grossmünster churches in Zurich, as well as for the Einsiedeln and St. Gallen abbeys. Almost 2,000 cubic metres (70,629 ft^{3}) of sandstone still are mined (as of 2004) annually, usually 5 metres (16 ft) wide and about 3.5 metres (11 ft) high blocks weighing approximately 16 tonnes, even up to 25 tonnes.

== Former Lake Tuggen ==
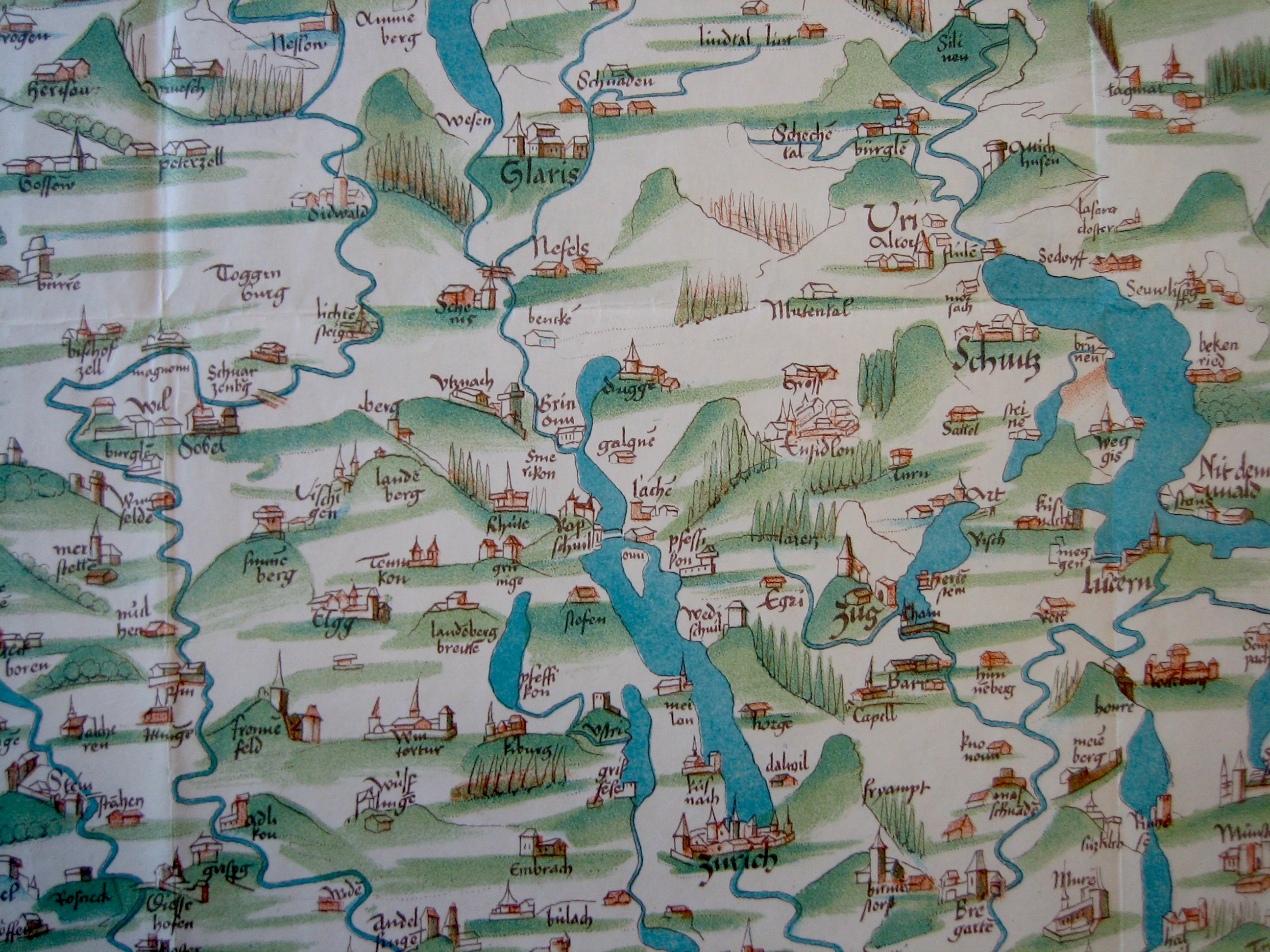
Map by Konrad Türst showing the lake at Tuggen, 1496. North is down

There used to be another lake south-east of the Obersee, the former Lake Tuggen (Tuggenersee) at Tuggen. It disappeared due to alluvial deposition by the Linth in the early 16th century AD and was for the last time mentioned in 1538 AD.

After the last Ice Age, the melting Linth Glacier formed a large lake spanning the area of today's Lake Zurich and Lake Walen, reaching as far as Sargans to the east. About 5000 BC, Lake Walen and Lake Zurich got separated as the area around Niederurnen and Weesen raised above the lake level. At that time, Lake Zurich reached as far as Tuggen to the east, and the small hills of today's Linth Plain (e.g. Buechberg) formed islands/peninsulas. The shallow eastern part of the lake disappeared gradually over the next millennia because of alluvial deposition. Eventually, the eastern portion got separated from Lake Zurich, forming Lake Tuggen, which was still linked with the Obersee by a narrow strait and finally a short stretch of the Linth near the Grynau Castle.

== See also ==
- List of lakes in Switzerland
- Prehistoric pile dwellings around Lake Zurich
- Obersee Nachrichten – Swiss German-language weekly newspaper
- Zürichsee-Zeitung – Swiss German-language daily newspaper

== Literature ==
- Erholungslandschaft Zürichsee. ILF Schriftenreihe Nr. 11. Published by Institut für Landschaft und Freiraum HSR et al., Rapperswil 2014, ISBN 978-3-9523972-6-8.
- Ivo Auf der Maur (Hg.): Columban von Luxeuil, Mönchsregeln. eos Klosterverlag, St. Ottilien 2007 ISBN 3-8306-7276-4.
- 2000 ganz farbige Seiten. Von den Neandertalern im Drachenloch bis zu den Alamannen im Thurtal (Volume 1). Kantonaler Lehrmittelverlag, St. Gallen.
