= Knie's Kinderzoo =

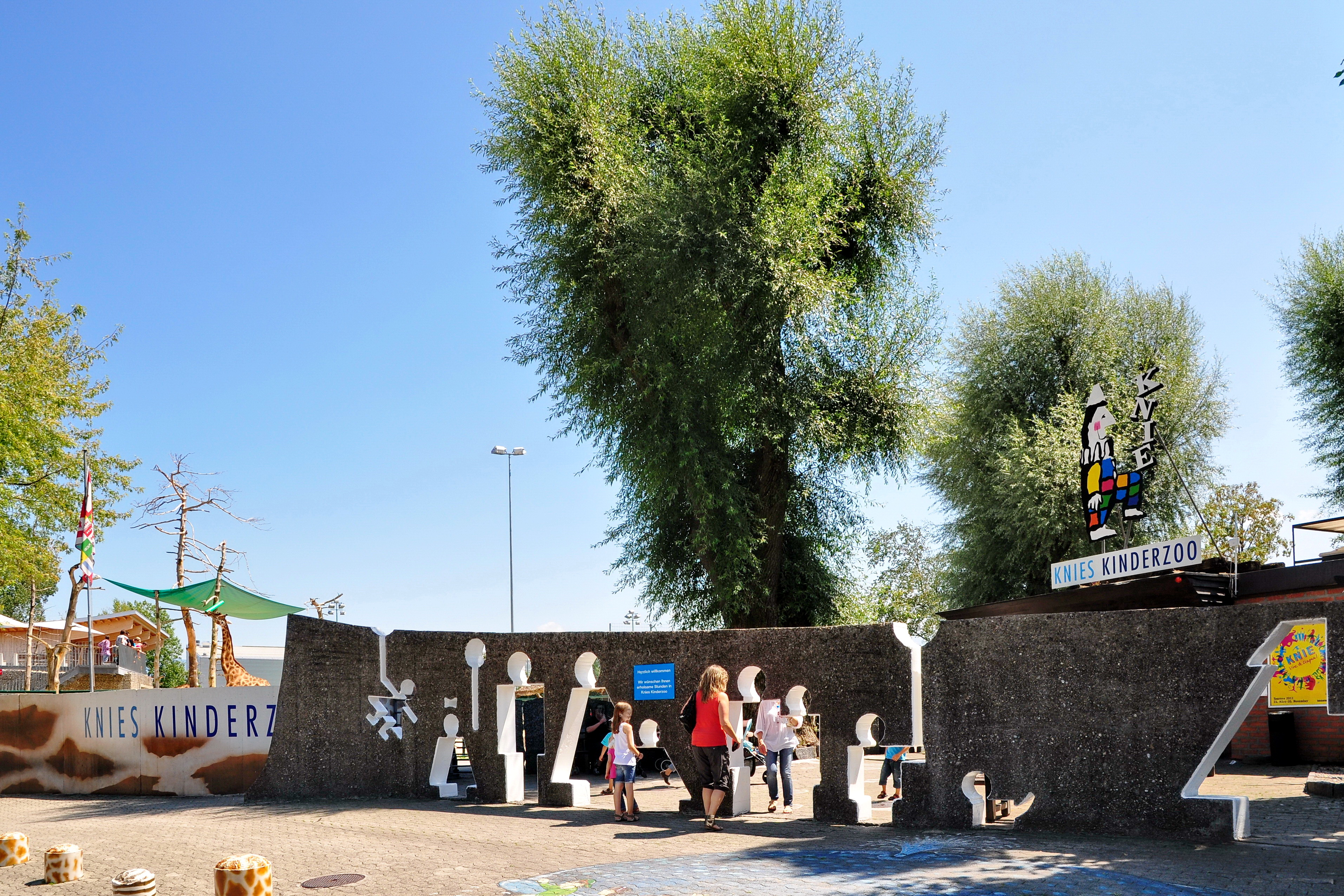
- Interactive map of Knie's Kinderzoo
- 47°13′26.69″N 8°49′19.16″E
- Date opened: 1962
- Location: Rapperswil, Switzerland
- No. of animals: ~400
- No. of species: 44
- Website: www.knieskinderzoo.ch

Knie's Kinderzoo (German: Knies Kinderzoo) is a zoo aimed for children. It is located in the Swiss municipality of Rapperswil.

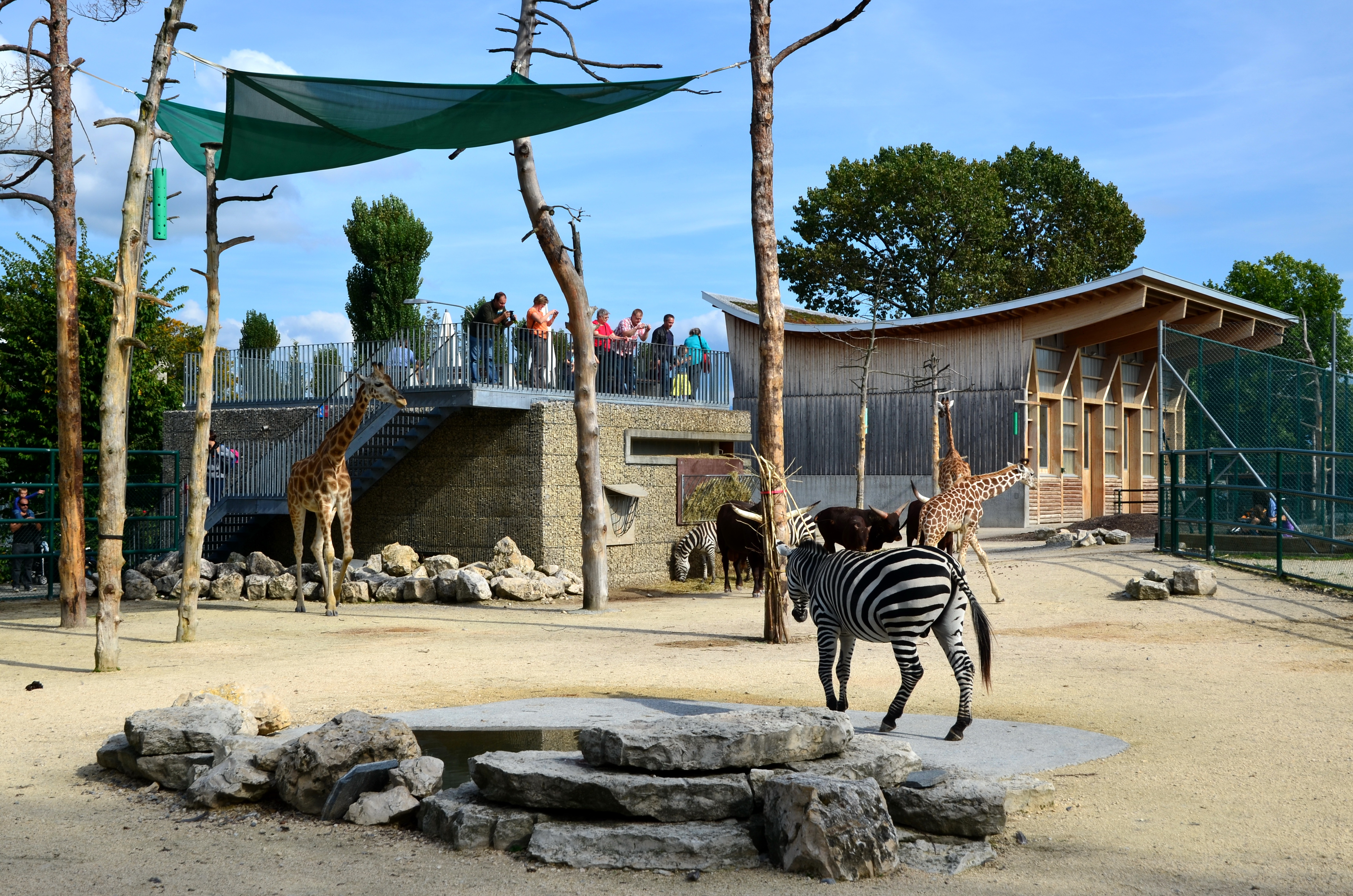
Equus zebra and Giraffa camelopardalis

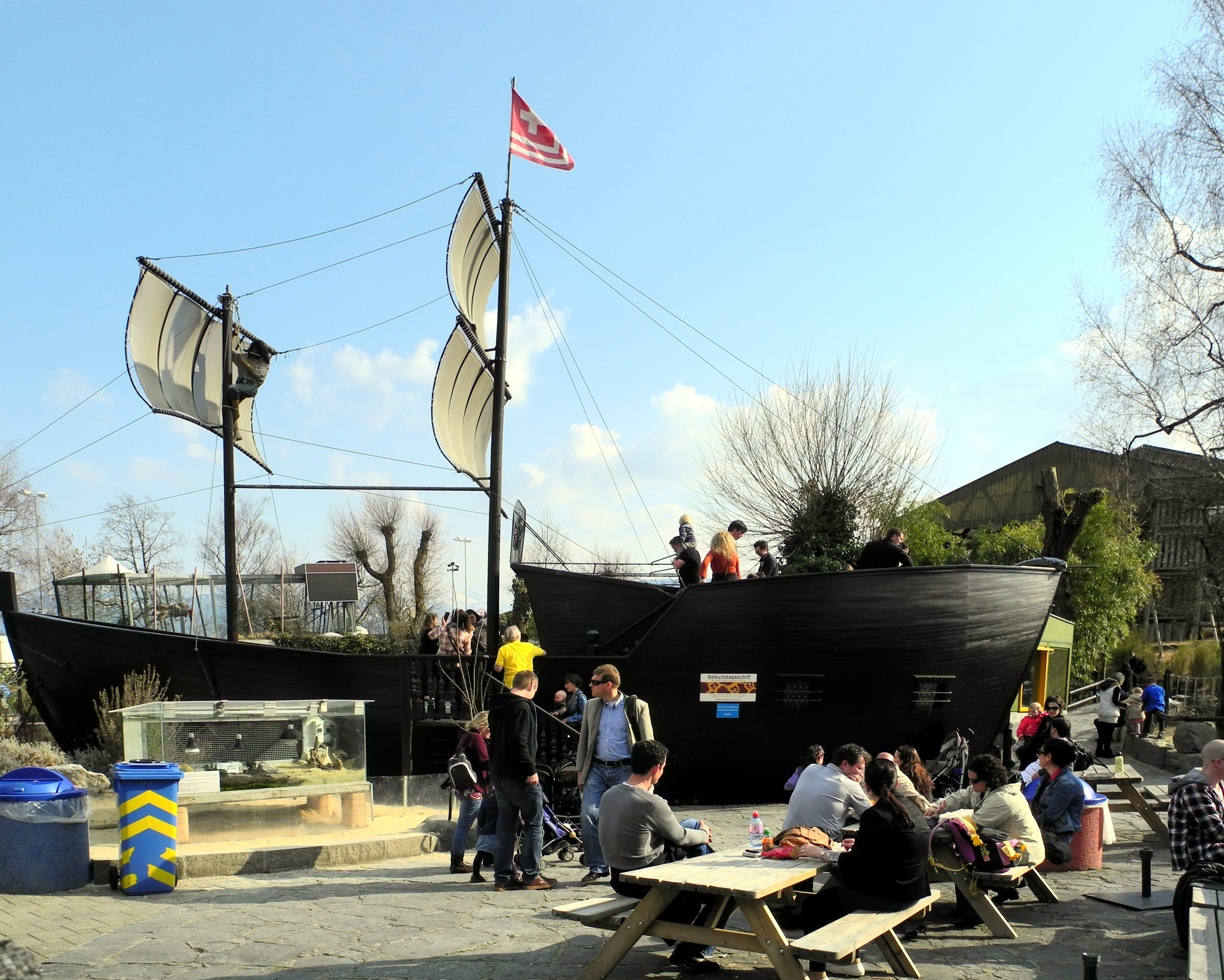
Children's pirate ship

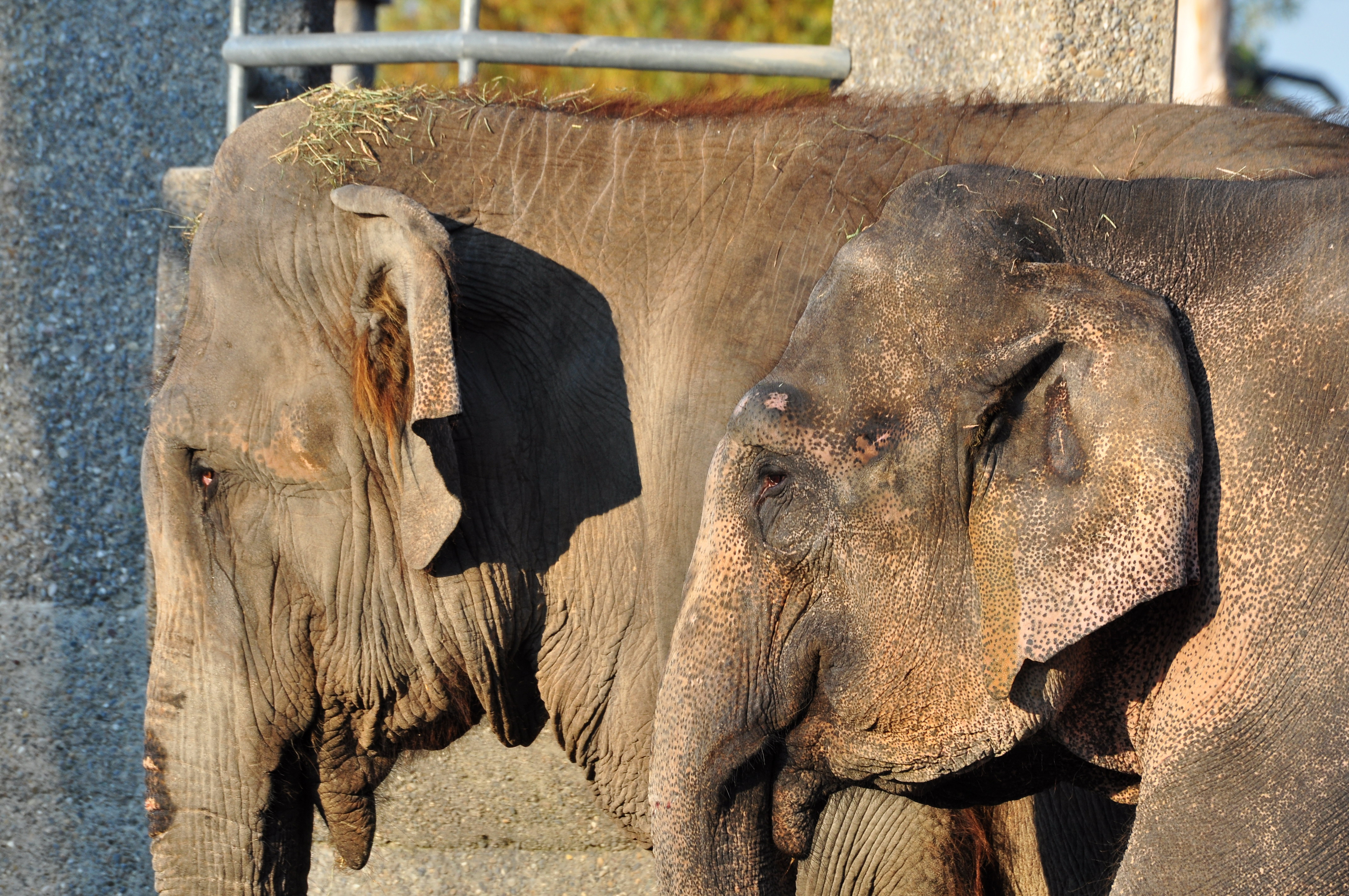
Two Asian elephants

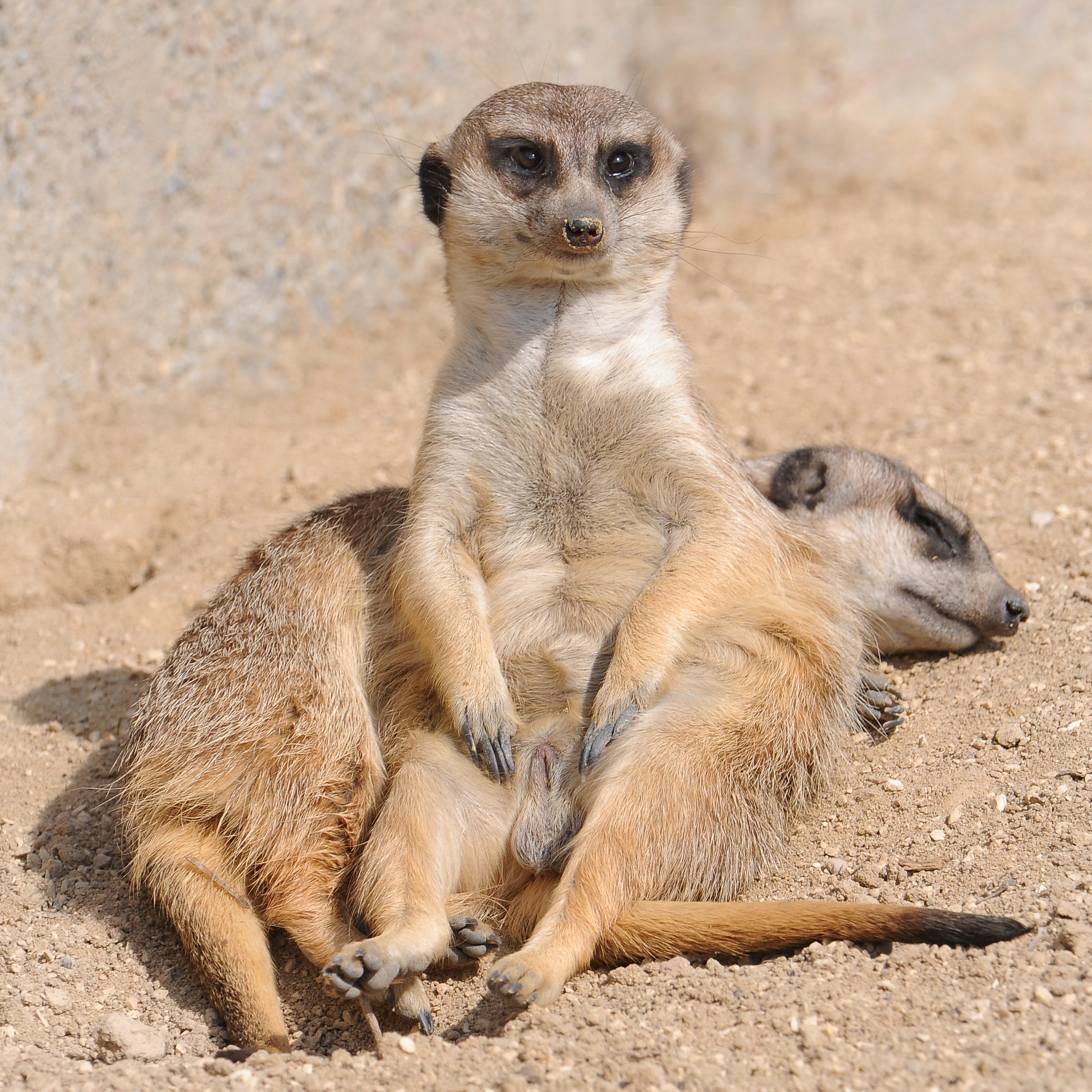
Two Meerkats

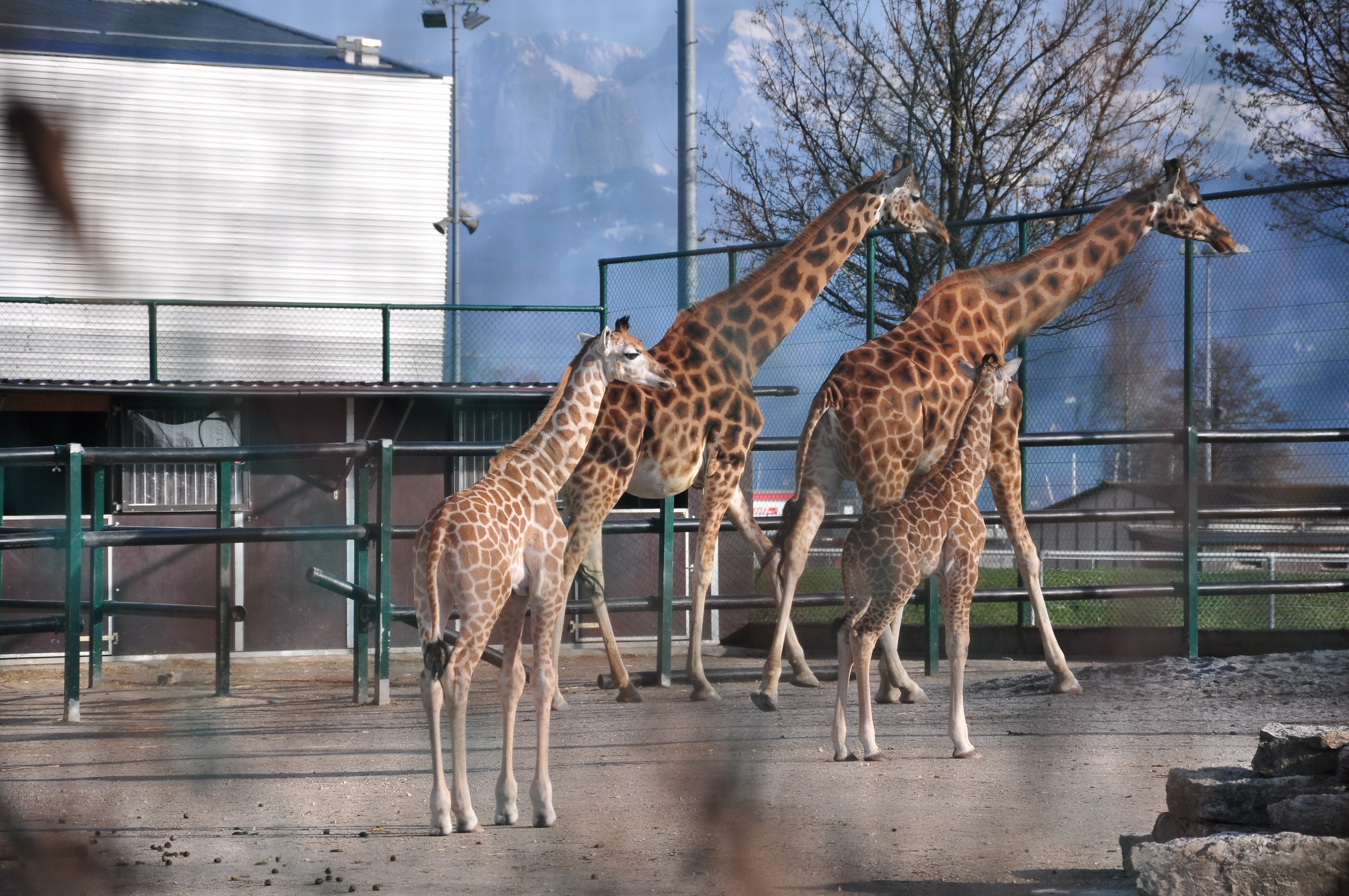
The giraffes: Luana and Mala, and the two "J's" (born in March 2011)

== Location ==
Aimed for children, the zoo is located at Oberseestrasse nearby Seedamm respectively Rapperswil railway station on upper Lake Zürich. Ending winter season, Kinderzoo opens daily from 9 am to 6 pm between the first Saturday in March and 31 October, including Sundays and public holidays.

== History and facilities ==
Knie's Kinderzoo was built by the architect Wolfgang Behles and was inaugurated on 10 June 1962 by the brothers Fredy and Rolf Knie senior, representing the fifth generation of the Knie's Circus family. On 15 February 1963 the first birth of an Asian elephant in Switzerland was announced: Sahib-Fridolin was the son of the elephants Ceylon and Siam. The baby elephant is reared by elephant expert and animal trainer Josef Hack with the bottle because Ceylon had no milk and died three months after giving birth. The dolphins Sindbad and Skipper became a further attraction on 19 June 1965; they were the first trained dolphins from Florida ever to be shown in an inland European country. On 4 August birth of the second Asian elephant Madura, a female, was celebrated. Her mother was Java. Madura's father Siam is considered as the most successful breeding bull in captivity: Father of 2 Asian elephants in Rapperswil and 12 elephants in Paris, where he was admired in the Natural History Museum in 2000. On 25 July 1970 the first permanent dolphinarium featuring an 800,000-litre pool opened at Knie’s Kinderzoo – it was closed for animal protection reasons in 199x. 1976 became the record year in the zoo's history, totalling 399,331 visitors - 7,8 millions by 1987. In 1991 the fur seals swimming pool with an underwater observation window opened, as well as the playground pirate ship. On 24 March 1993 Diva, a Giraffa camelopardalis rothschildi, gave birth of her son Baluku who became the first Giraffa born in the zoo.

In 2000 the renewed elephant facility with bath, waterfall, clay wallows, scratching posts, and an equestrian center for visitors was opened. That same year, the zoo launched its website. Besides, the new ship for children was opened. 2001 saw the launch of the zoo slogan, literally animals up close. In the jubilee year 2002 Parrot flight demonstrations became an additional attraction in the Otarium, as well as the camel riding along with elephant and pony rides, and the grounds newly created sites Katta Island and Hyacinth Macaw opened. On 9 April, the newborn giraffe bull of mother Luana and father Kimali was christened Rivaldo by Ursus & Nadeschkin. 2003 saw the inauguration of an adventure playground with a hatchery for ducks and chickens (1,000 square metres (11,000 sq ft)), and a plant for guinea pigs and rabbits. Diva, the ancestress of the zoo's Rothschild giraffe breed, and Miniak, one of the oldest elephant in captivity, died at the age of 22, respectively 52. The facility for Suricata suricatta and Cynictis penicillata was opened in 2005, and at the so-called Steinwal, the landmark of the zoo, a cinema was opened. On 1 July 2006, the zoo's second largest project: the Giraffa camelopardalis rothschildi was built adjacent to the current enclosure according to the latest research results, including wide outdoor facilities on an area of more than 2,500 square metres (26,910 sq ft). The cooperation with Ocean Care to protect the Mediterranean monk seals was also renewed. On 6 March 2008 one of the largest plants in Europe for Camelus ferus in Mongolian style was opened on 3,500 square metres (37,674 sq ft). The two elephants houses were newly built and offer over 800 square metres (8,611 sq ft), and ten individual boxes 34 square metres (366 sq ft), scratching walls/ posts, solarium and feet mild specialty flooring. In 2009 and 2010, the catering establishments have been upgraded with a new infrastructure, and the terrace on the Flamingo pond. As of 2009, the zoo had 303 specimens of 51 species.

The zoo got much more green and colorful by a greening concept that was implemented at 16 critical points and continued by 2010 in a second stage, and the entrance area was renewed. Dining facilities were further extended, and the wheelchair area in the Otarium. 2012 was under the motto 50 years: a parrot air show was added to the program, and Capybara, a mammal and the largest living rodent in the world became a further attraction. In September 2013 a charity walk collected funds for the new Elephant park Himmapan. To promote the close contact with the animals, the zoo introduced zookeeper ground accompaniments. The facility of the popular petting with African dwarf goats, Vietnamese pot-bellied pigs, chickens and sheep was doubled. Species, among them Maras, Engadine sheep and Racka sheep, Smew and goldeneye and Tyrolean chickens became further residents of the zoo – a total of 44 species with around 400 animals. On the world giraffe's day on 21 June 2014, Massamba and Makwetu were born. On 7 March 2015 the elephant park Himmapan and the Thai gastronomy Himmapan Lodge opened, and the cheetah and penguin plants were presented to the public. In 2016 the zoo presented its new education concept by learning in a playful manner interesting facts about the elephants, the cheetahs and the penguins. The new home for lemurs is inaugurated, and Himmapan became the new home of all elephants of the Circus Knie in 2016.

== Animals ==
Knie's Kinderzoo particularly aims at children (Kinder in German) and belongs to the Swiss National Circus Knie tradition. The interaction between the visitors and the animals is a speciality of this zoo, for example, various pets can caressed and fed. Visitors may obtain food specially selected for the animals (mostly popcorn!) in designated bowls. The zoo does not include any predators, but elephants, ungulates, camels, several species of monkeys, rodents, kangaroos, giraffes and a whole range of birds – 303 animals of 51 species in all. The zoo also offers a sea lion show, two restaurants, refreshments, a 2 ft (610 mm) narrow gauge horse-drawn tramway, and games. Since the dolphin approach in captivity fell into disrepute, the well-known zoo's dolphin show has been closed years ago. The zoo is part of the winter quarters of the Circus Knie and also houses circus animals that are not on tour.

== New facilities ==
In 2014/16 the zoo renewed and expanded its facilities. The Himmapan elephant park was the largest project in the zoo's history, and comprises 6,500 square metres (69,965 sq ft), including dining facilities on a rock construction for 300 guests operating all over the year. Launched during the 2013 season, it was completed in March 2015. The old elephant facilities have been rebuilt as habitats specially designed for the particular needs of the zoo's cheetah and penguin species. The zoo also participates in the European Endangered Species Programme (EEP), by using the elephant's plant. The Knie family announced in summer 2015 to stroke the elephant act from the circus program. Henceforth, the elephant cows should be held throughout the year to establish breed capable and functioning matriarchal group.

The old facilities have been the elephant's home since 1999; Knie’s Kinderzoo plans to build a centrally located botanical area with vegetation that evokes the ecosystem of dry savannah to emulate an African grassland environment. Right next to it, there will be a section of landscape resembling the Pacific coast of Chile. The habitat environments shall meet the particular needs of a colony of Acinonyx jubatus jubatus and Spheniscus humboldti.
