= Circus Knie =

Swiss circus

Coordinates: 47.2299851°N 8.8209758°E

Logo of Circus Knie

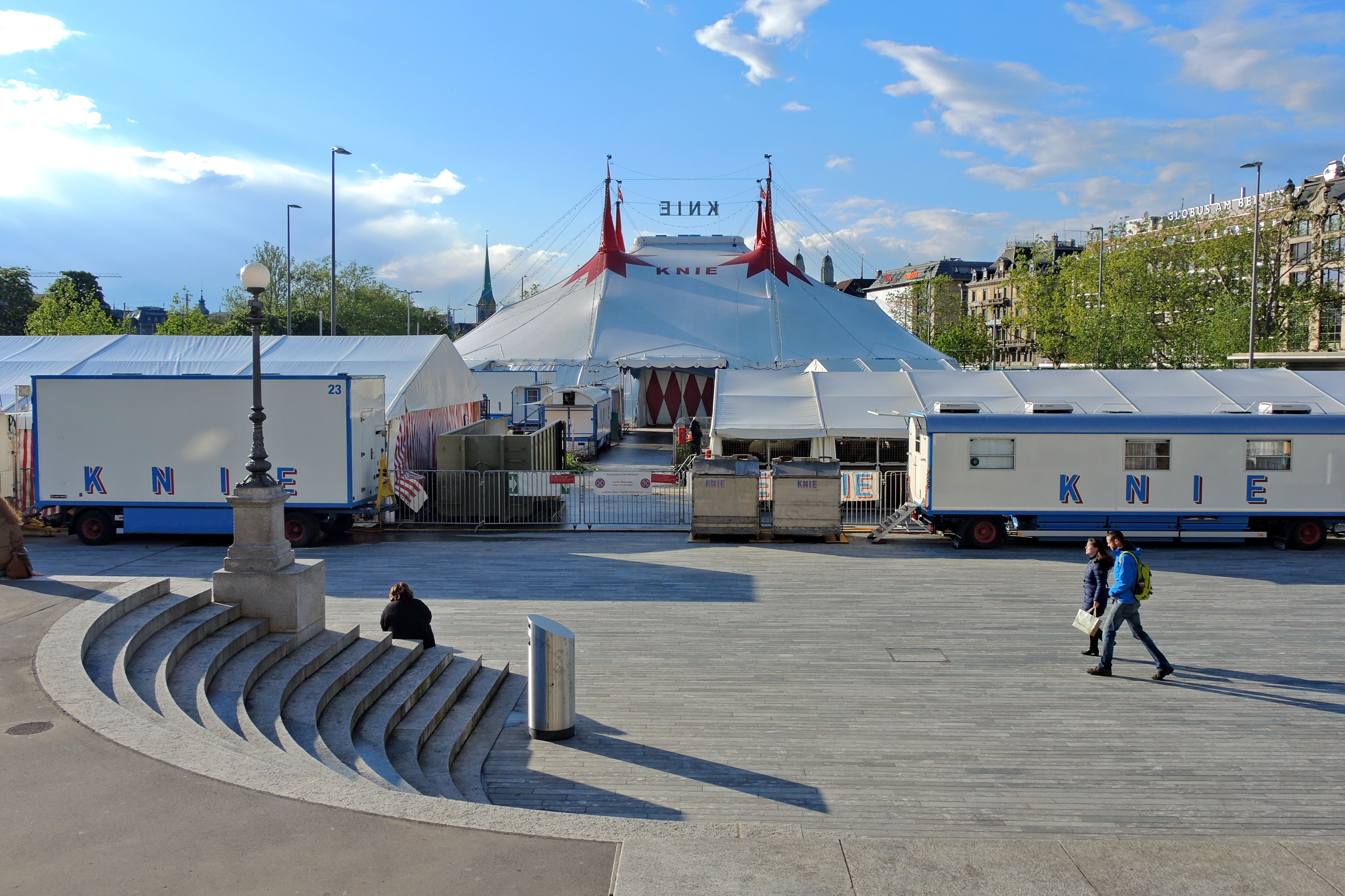
Circus Knie at Sechseläutenplatz in Zürich, May 2014

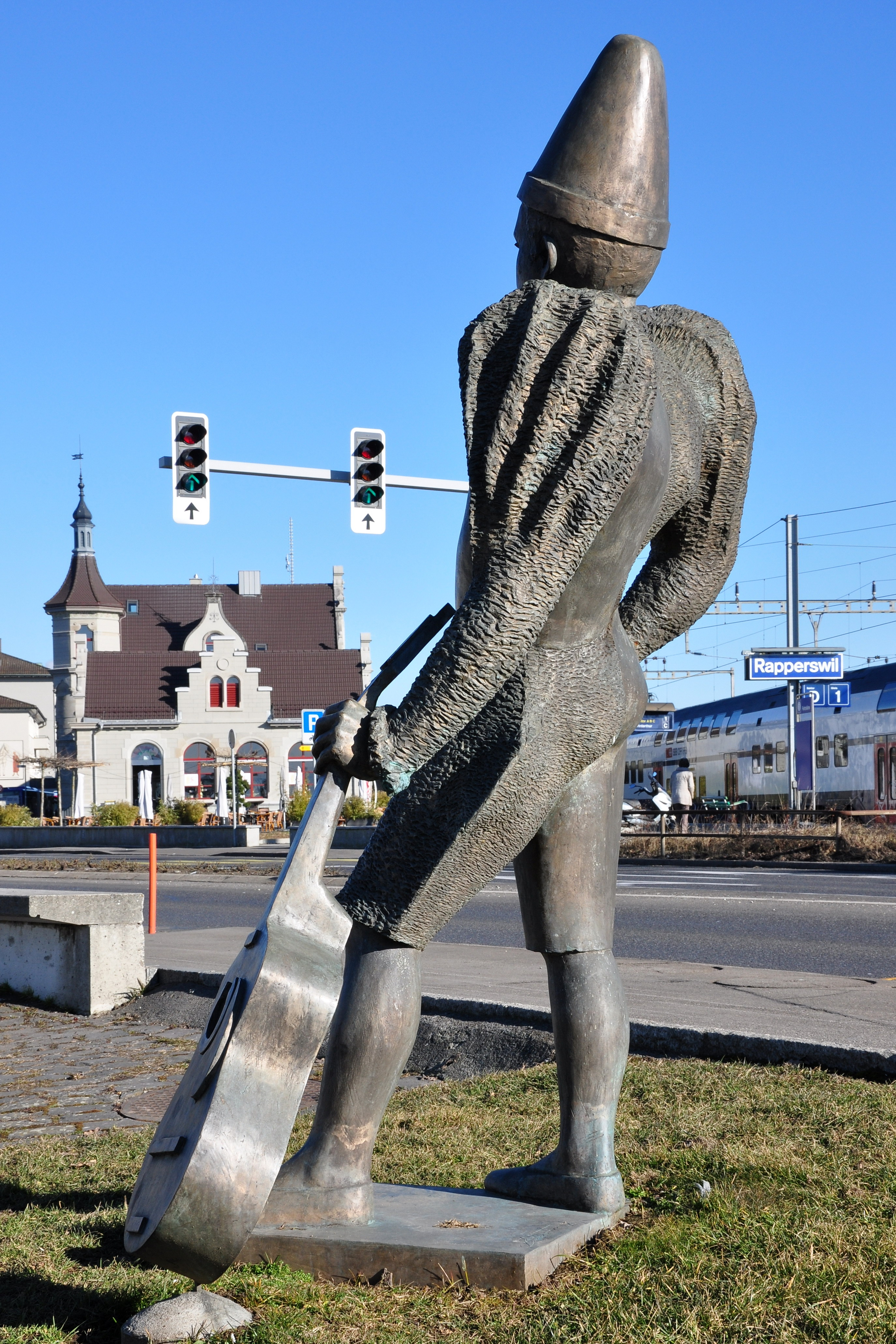
Sculpture of the Circus Knie located at the Rapperswil harbour

Circus Knie (German: Schweizer National-Circus Knie, French: Cirque National Suisse Knie) is the largest circus of Switzerland, based in Rapperswil.

== History ==
The circus was founded in 1803 by the Knie family and has existed in its present form since 1919, when it changed from an open arena to a covered tent. The circus has long been famous for its animals and now operates a zoo (Knie's Kinderzoo) while its museum in Rapperswil closed in July 2017.

In 1999, Franco Knie was named Best Animal Tamer at the International Circus Festival of Monte-Carlo. Today, the circus is an enterprise with about 200 employees, operated by Frédy and Franco Knie in partnership with insurance company Swiss Life.

Tightrope acrobat David Dimitri has been associated with the circus. A co-production with Cirque du Soleil was mounted in 1992. In 1999, Karls kühne Gassenschau toured with the Swiss National Circus. In 2000, it was the focus on Hanna & Knill including six clown cabarets with Ueli Bichsel, Neda und Maite, and Gardi Hutter.

Ursus & Nadeschkin became in 2002 the leading act and headline of the Circus Knie, performing 257 times during the 2002 season tour and having an audience totaling one million spectators.

Princess Stéphanie of Monaco travelled with the circus for some months in 2001 and 2002, while in a relationship with Franco Knie.

In 2020, Circus Knie celebrated its 100th anniversary. The show featured Swiss comedians Viktor Giacobbo and Mike Müller.

Circus Knie's 2021 tour was postponed due to COVID-related restrictions. The lineup included singer-songwriter Bastian Baker and the comedy duo Duo Full House.
