= Karls kühne Gassenschau =

Karls kühne Gassenschau is in the widest sense a Swiss circus, variété or open-air theatre, based in Zurich.

== Name ==
There's no man called Karl that initiated the cabaret. Karls kühne Gassenschau, meaning Charles' keen side street show, was founded as a street theatre of a bunch of wild street performers. Karl rather refers to the Middle High German word for 'free man' as opposed to the nobles.

== History ==
The show was founded in 1984 as a classical street performance act. In 1999, the ensemble toured with Switzerland’s national Circus Knie, after which they increasingly favored fixed installations over touring formats.

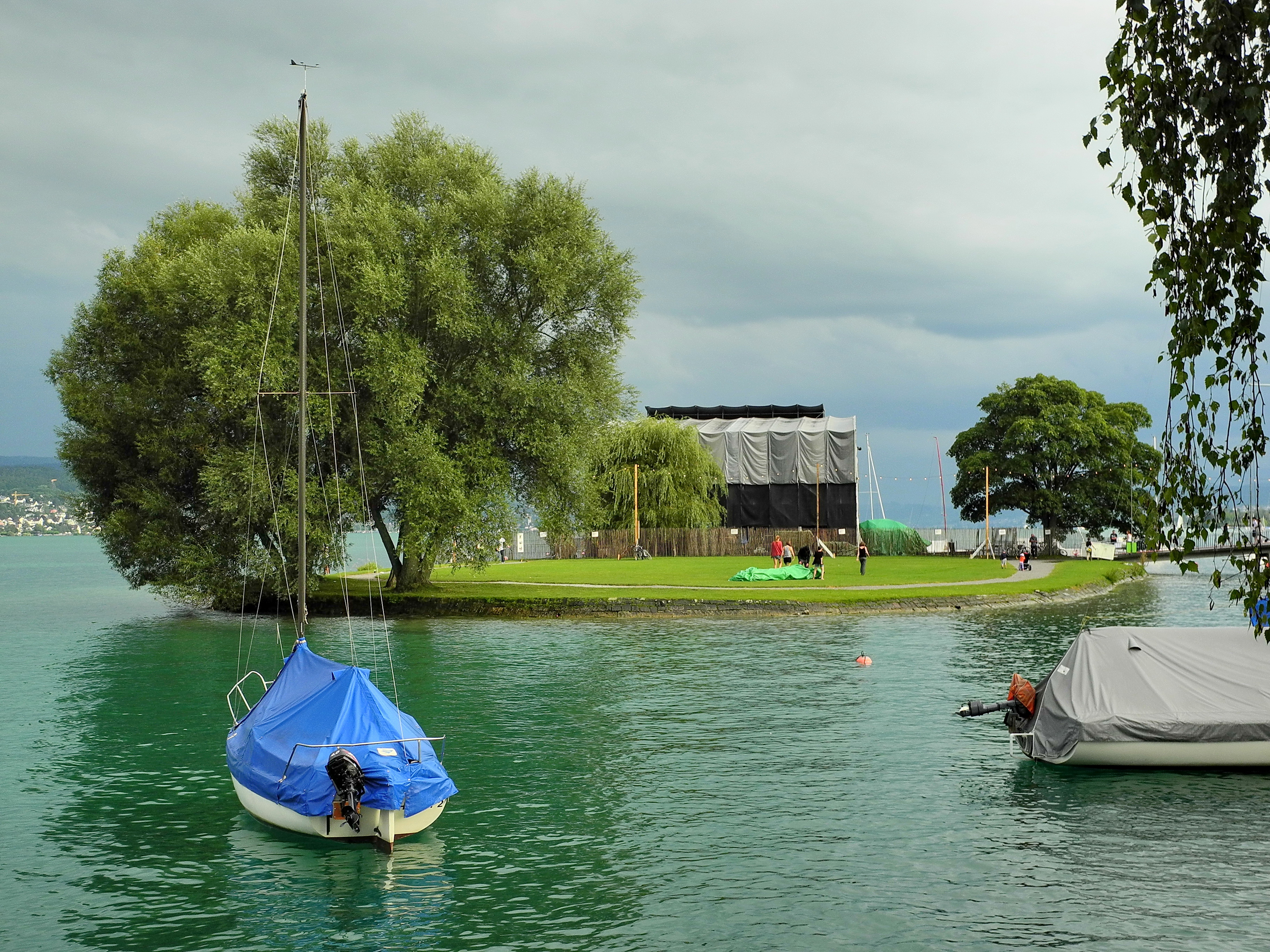
Saffa-Insel in Zürich

The multimedial supported artistic shows, focussed on large installations as a seasonal theme, usually are fixed at locations for one theatre season, sometimes as the present since 2014 in the municipality of Winterthur and St-Triphon, some years ago in Wallisellen or at the so-called Saffa-Insel on occasion of the Zürcher Theater Spektakel. Karls kühne Gassenschau attracts up to 100,000 spectators a year.

=== Program and orientation ===
- 1984 Karls kühne Gassenschau: Street performances, artistics and variété.
- 1985–1987: Gauklerjahre: Years as travelling artists.
- 1987–1988: Die Kreuzfahrt auf der "MS Matterhorn". Eine artistische Seefahrt.
- 1989–1990: BAUSTELLE. Ein komödiantisches Aktionstheater.
- 1992: uniform. Freche Politsatire unter freiem Himmel.
- 1993: CITYPASSAGE. Rebellion der Strassenkünstler.
- 1994–1997: S.T.E.I.N.B.R.U.C.H. Ein archaisches Landschaftstheater. Also as r.u.p.t.u.r.e in French language in 1995.
- 1997: Grand Paradis. Anarchie im Luxushotel.
- 1998–2000: STAU. Ein automobiles Spektakel, also performed as French t.r.a.f.i.c. in 2001.
- 1999: Auf Schweizer Tournee mit dem Zirkus Knie.
- 2002–2005: AKUA. Ein opulentes Wasserspektakel.
- 2006–2010: SILO 8. Höhenflüge im Dschungel der Erinnerungen.
- 2011–2015: FABRIKK. Eine Geschichte über Heimat, Identitätsverlust und Schokoladenträume.
- 2016-2019 & 2021: SEKTOR 1
- 2022-2023: reprise of SILO 8
- since 2024: RECEPTION which premiered on 13 June 2024 in Dietikon.

==== Sektor 1 ====
"Sektor 1" was performed from the end of May 2018 until October 2018 in Olten, and in spring 2019 once again in Olten where everyone who is interested can take a look behind the scenes of the spectacle with special backstage tickets. In the latest production, fire and effects are an integral part. A pyrotechnician and a mathematician complement the permanent team of the Gassenschau. The actors have to change again and again during the show. This also happens directly behind the stage. Moving or getting from one part of the stage to the other has to happen very quickly. The 13 technicians and assistants, who are also behind the stage, know exactly when they have to stand where in order not to stand in the way. Ida, played by Gassenschau co-founder Brigitt Maag, sinks into an artificial pond, which quickly empties itself. Then the lowest part of the pond – in the shape of a funnel – is pushed away so that Ida can get out and go back to the stage. When the pool is emptied, 500 bathtubs full of water have to be drained within a very short time. According to technician Otmar Faschian, this scene was planned very carefully and then practiced again and again until it no longer poses any danger to the actress.

== Notable participants ==
Some present Swiss acts and personalities, among them Ursus & Nadeschkin respectively Nadja Sieger, and Sandra Moser started their career as part of the show.

== Awards ==
- 1998: Prix Walo
