= Sechseläutenplatz =

Public square in the city of Zurich, Switzerland

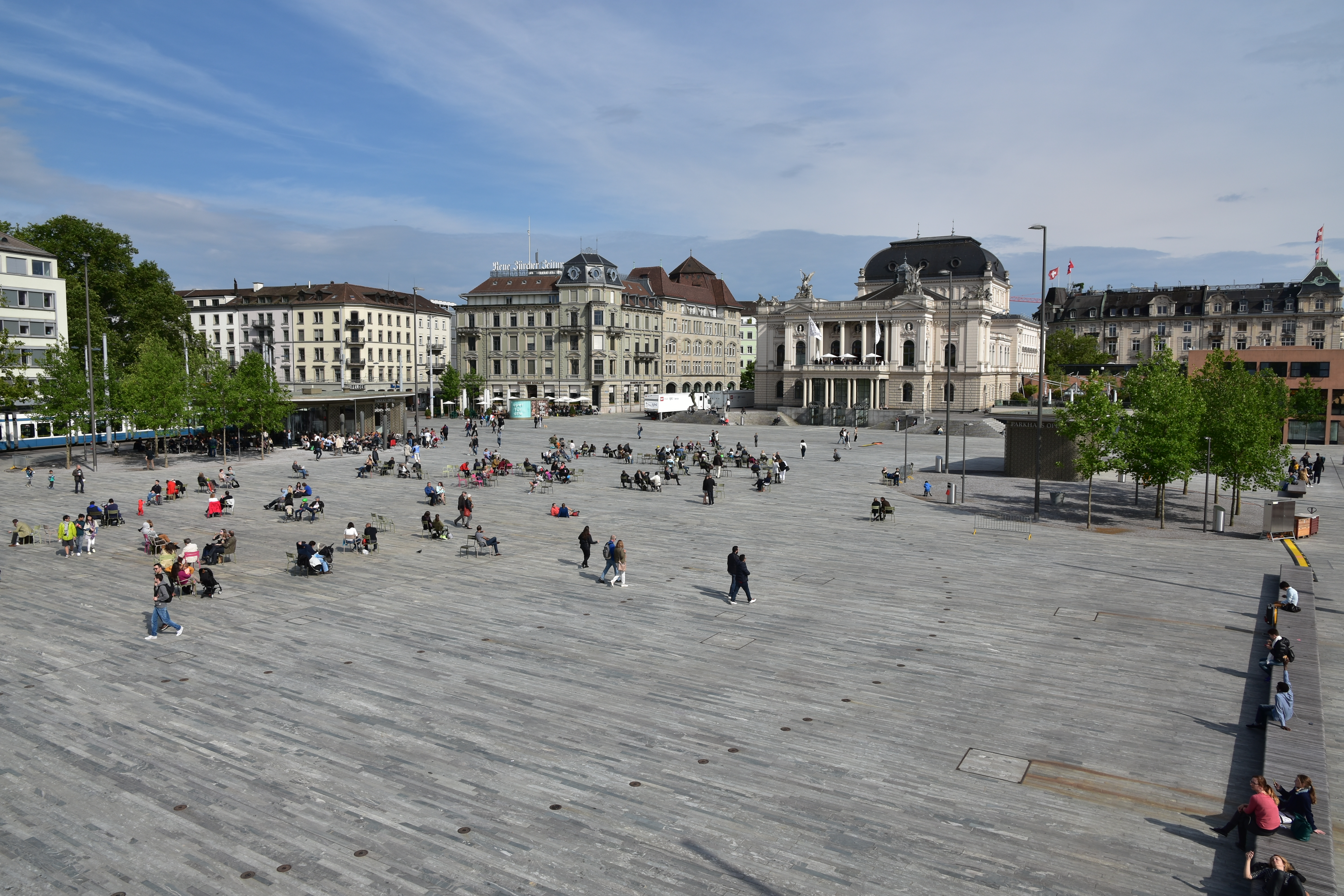
- Sechseläutenplatz as seen from the temporary pedestrian crossing towards Utoquai in June 2015
- Interactive map of Sechseläutenplatz
- Former names: Sechseläutenwiese; Theaterplatz; Stadelhoferbollwerk
- Type: city square
- Owner: City of Zurich
- Addresses: Sechseläutenplatz
- Location: Zurich, Switzerland
- Postal code: CH-8001
- Coordinates: 47°21′57.96″N 8°32′45.24″E

Construction
- Construction start: 11 Mai 2009
- Completion: 31 January 2014 (Opéra parking)
- Inauguration: 22 April 2014

Sechseläutenplatz (literally: Sechseläuten square) is the largest town square situated in Zurich, Switzerland. Its name derives from the Sechseläuten (the city's traditional spring holiday), which is celebrated on the square in April.

Sechseläutenplatz in July 2021 (view as a 360° interactive panorama)

== Geography ==
Sechseläutenplatz is located on the east shore of Lake Zurich, just south of the lake's outflow to the river Limmat and the Schanzengraben moat. The plaza is bounded to the south by the linked Opernhaus and Bernhardtheater buildings; to the west by the Utoquai lakeside promenade; and to the east by Theaterstrasse, across which is Stadelhoferplatz, with the Stadelhofen railway station and the terminus of the Forchbahn (FOB). To the north, Sechseläutenplatz merges into Bellevueplatz, where stops for the Zurich tram lines 2, 4, 5, 8, 9, 11 and 15 are located.

On November 30, 2011, the government of Zurich announced that some streets would be renamed by redesigning the public area at Sechseläutenplatz. Theaterplatz will be part of the Sechseläutenplatz area, and Gottfried-Keller-Strasse and Goethestrasse partially repealed. Residents have been informed that these will be addressed as Sechseläutenplatz 1 to 10. In all, Sechseläutenplatz covers an area of about 16,000 m^{2} (170,000 sq ft).

== History ==
=== Prehistory ===
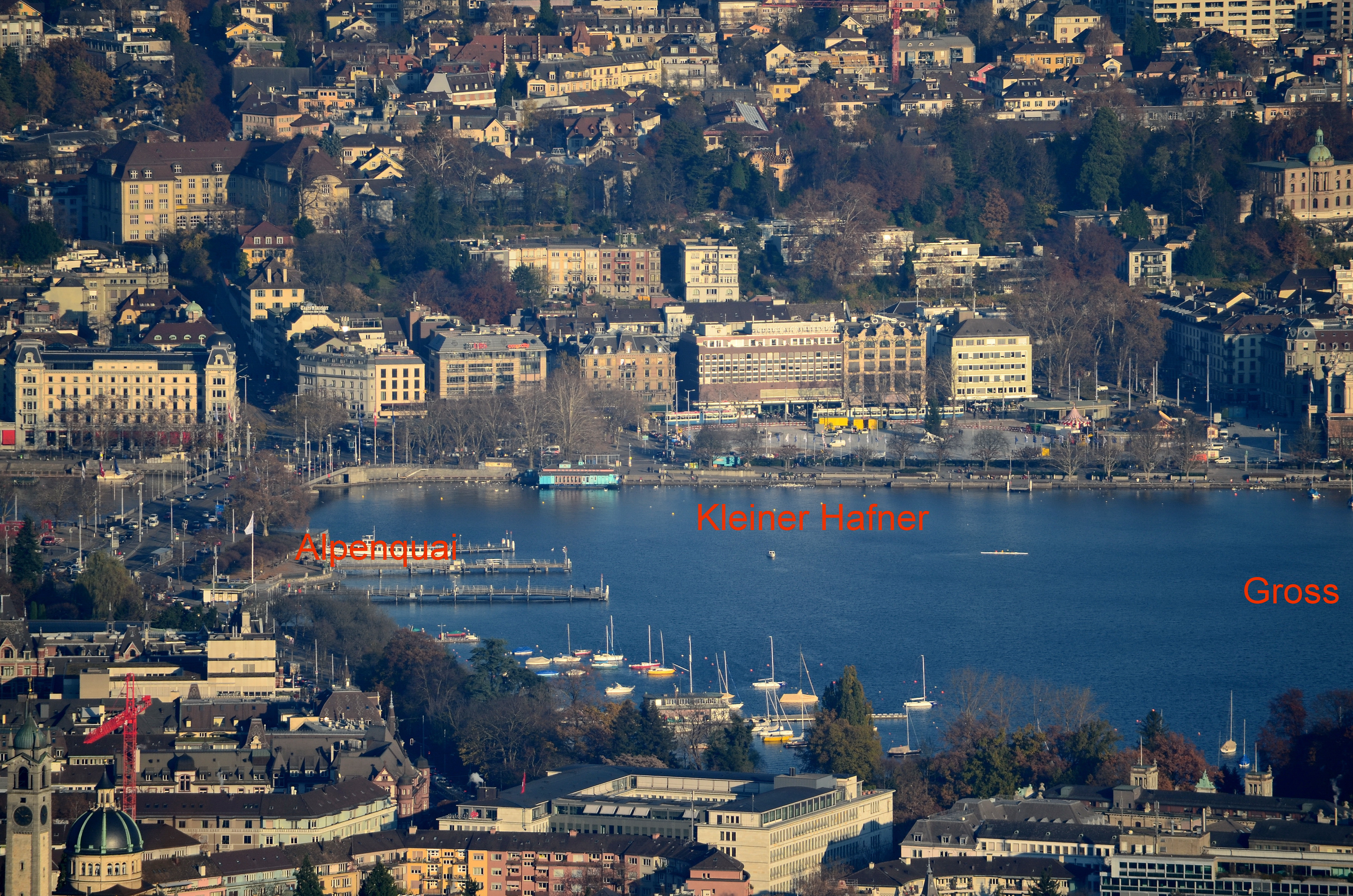
Locations of prehistoric settlements Alpenquai, Kleiner Hafner and Grosser Hafner

The area has been internationally known since 2009, when digging for an underground parking facility uncovered the remains of prehistoric pile dwellings. Remains were found in the immediate vicinity of this wetland soil settlement, Kleiner Hafner, in the lower basin of Lake Zurich. The construction works were suspended for nine months and the settlement remains were systematically archaeologically recorded. The results of the excavations are permanently displayed in a pavilion next to the lakeshore.

Located on what was then swampland between the river Limmat and Lake Zurich, around present-day Sechseläutzenplatz–Bürkliplatz, the prehistoric dwellings were set on piles to protect against occasional flooding by the rivers Linth and Jona. The Neolithic settlement Zurich–Enge Alpenquai is located at the Bürkliplatz in Enge, a locality of the municipality of Zurich. It was neighbored by the settlements at Kleiner Hafner (a former island/peninsula at Sechseläutenplatz) and Grosser Hafner island (which was also part of the Celtic and Gallo-Roman settlement area) in the effluence of the Limmat, within an area of about 0.2 square kilometres (50 acres) in the heart of the city of Zurich.

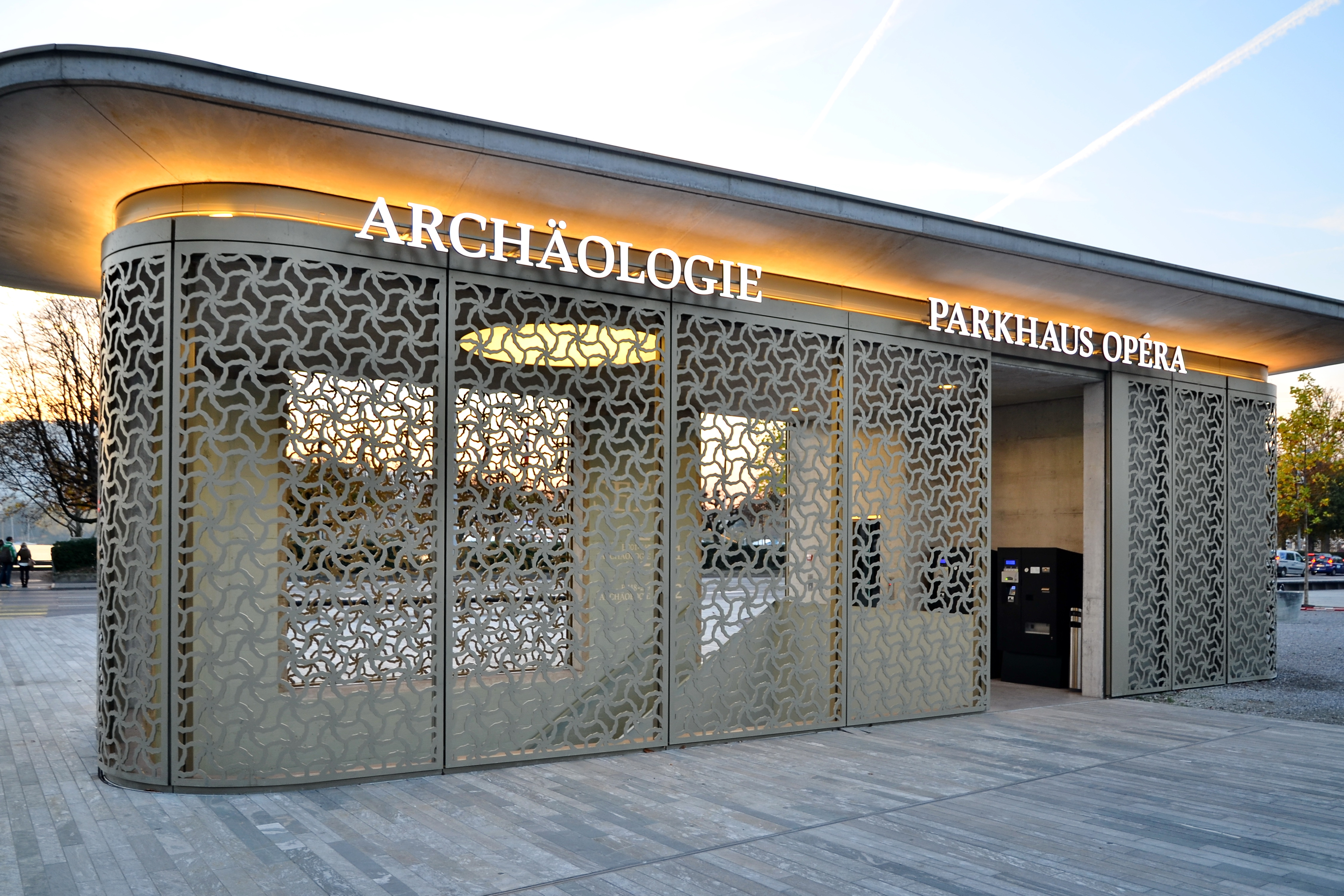
Entrance to the archaeological exhibition

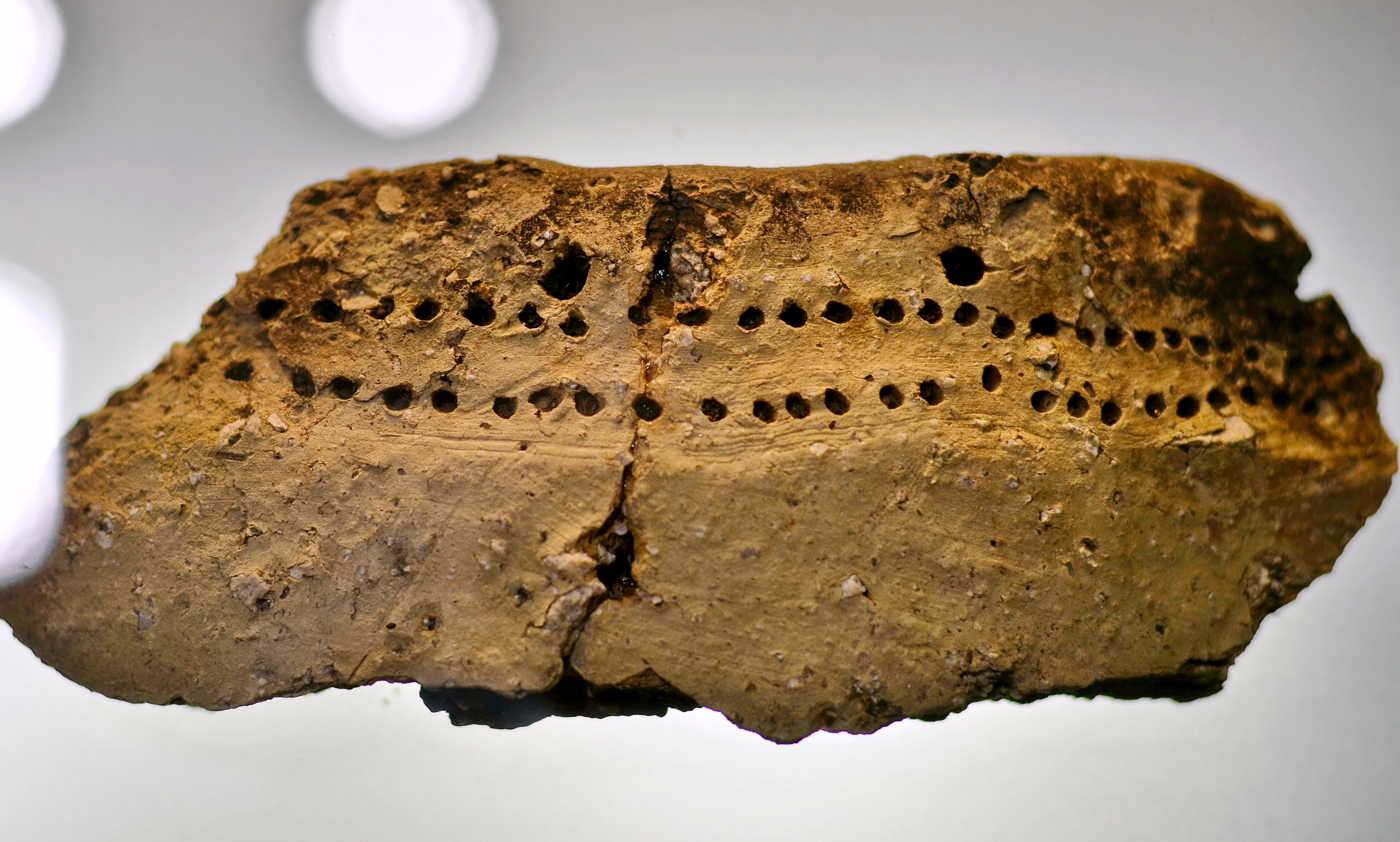
Horgen culture, fragment of ceramics, Kleiner Hafner

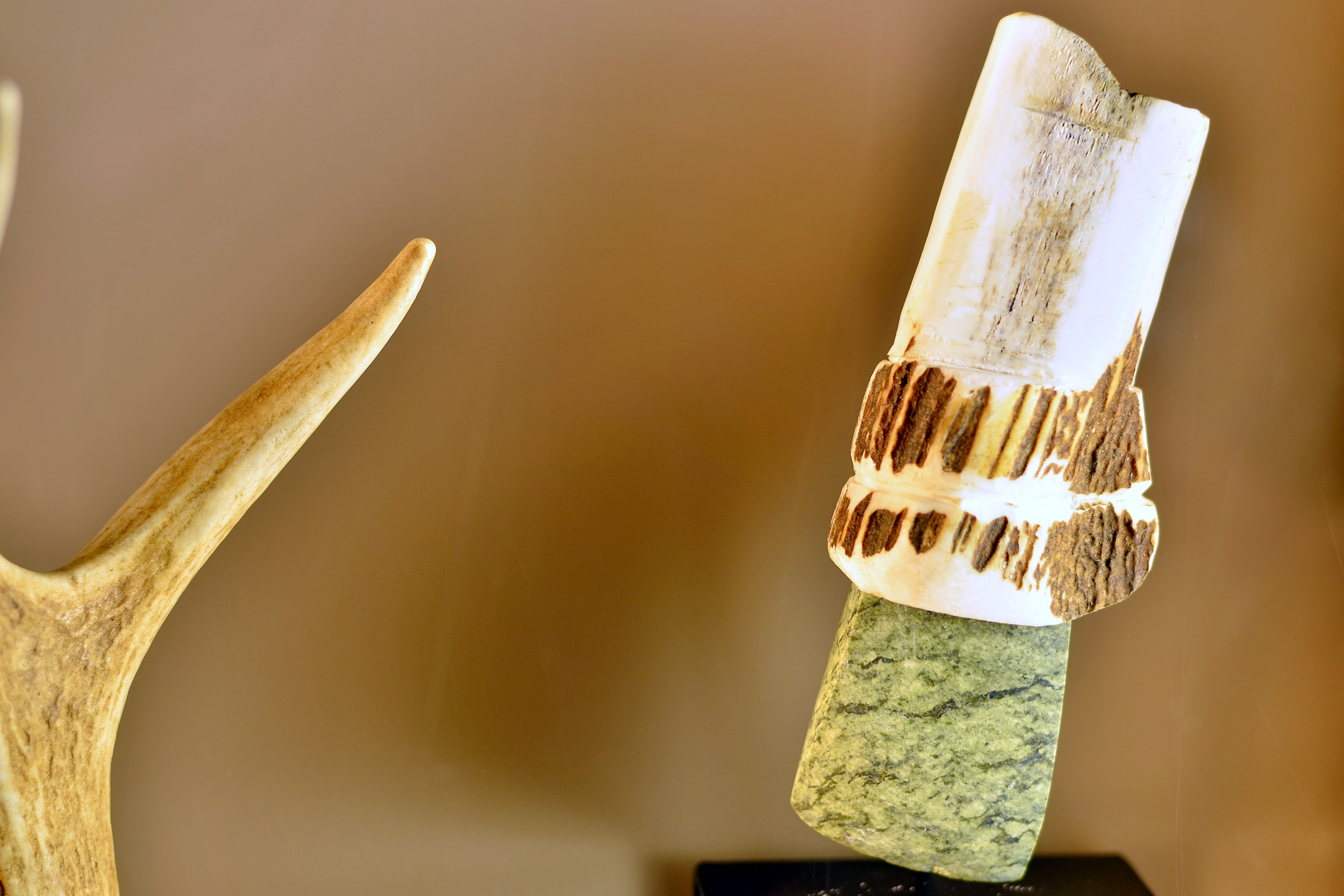
Horgen culture, fragment of a shafted stone axe

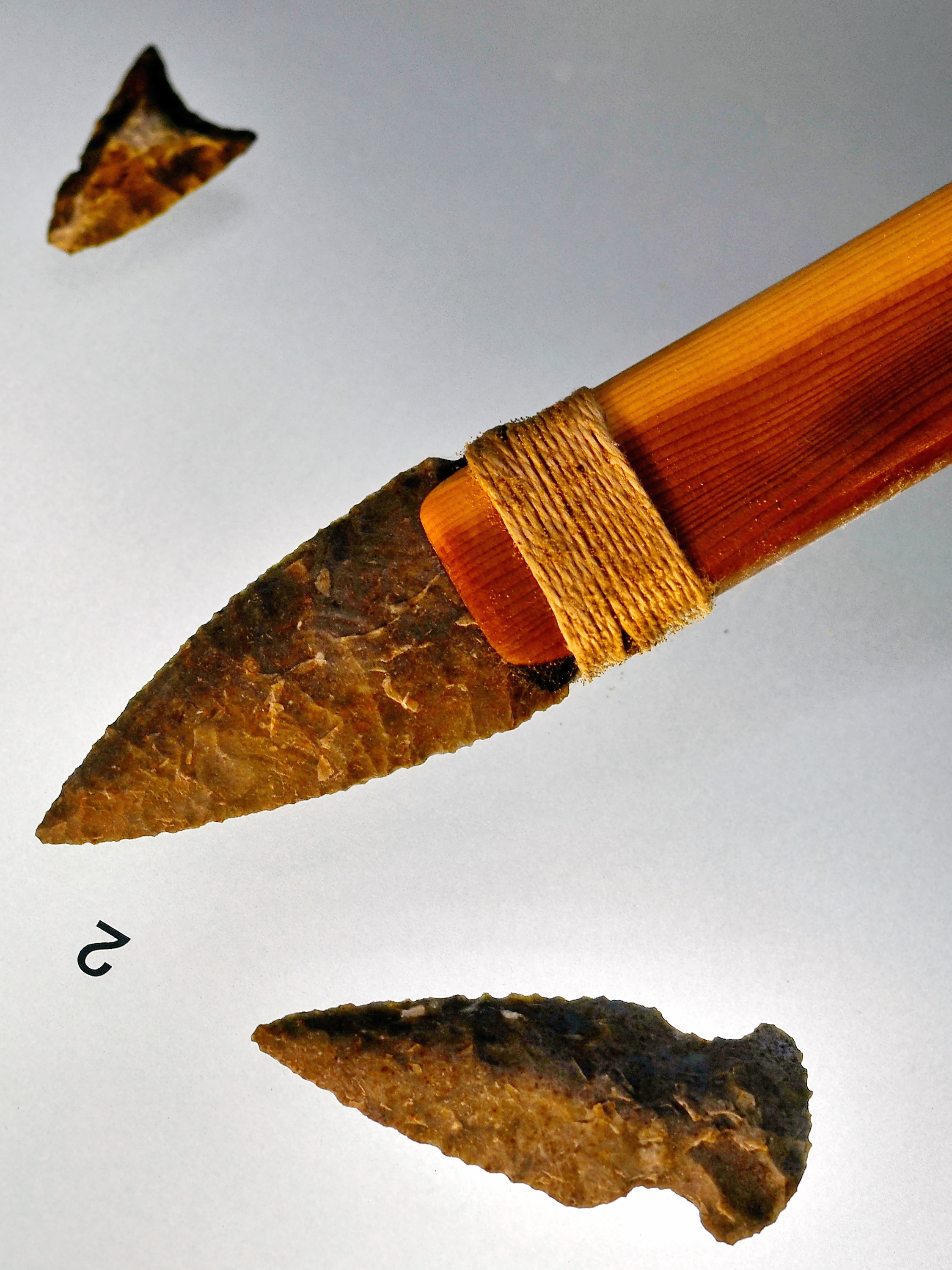
Horgen culture, silex knife and stone arrowheads

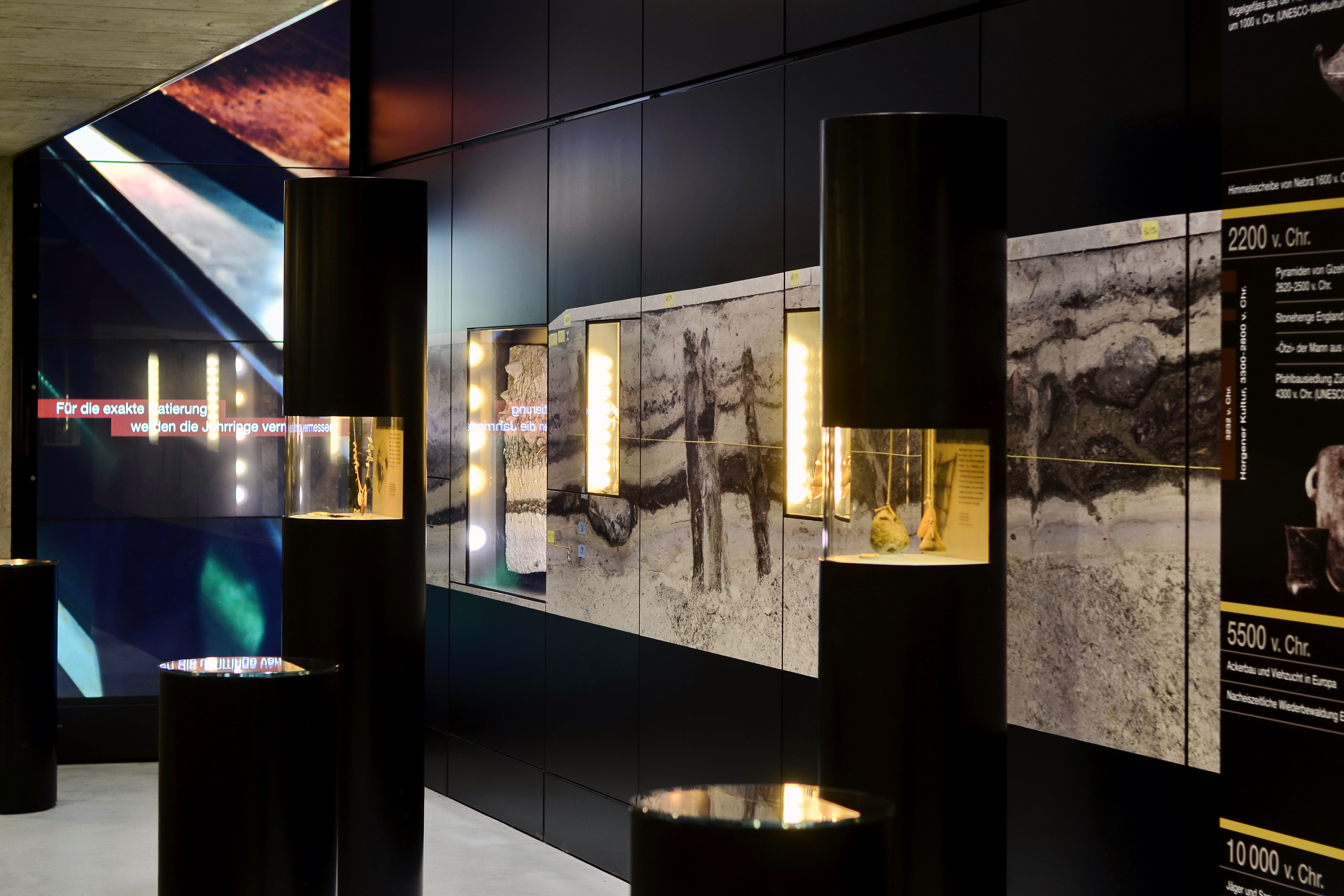
multimedia presentation at the lakeshore pavillon

Kleiner Hafner and Grosser Hafner are very rare sites, representing all periods of pile dwelling. There are finds from the Neolithic Egolzwil, Cortaillod and Horgen cultures, forming an important reference which allows study of the cultural development during the late 5th and early 4th millennia BC. They and other prehistoric settlements in the lower Lake Zurich area are part of Prehistoric Pile dwellings around the Alps, an UNESCO World Heritage Site, recognized as one of 111 world locations with the greatest scientific potential.

=== Since the Middle Ages ===
In the late European Middle Ages, the Sechseläutenplatz area was the location of the former military harbour of the city of Zurich, part of the Stadelhoferbollwerk bastion on the Lake Zurich shore. The former Stadelhofer bulwark was built as part of the fourth city fortifications in 1643 AD, its bastion built partly into the lake. In 1673, the Stadelhofen ravelin was attached. These fortifications, which had become obsolete, were completely demolished in 1837–38.

The restaurant Kornhaus operated on the site from 1839 to 1860. In 1867, the building was taken over as a temporary facility of the Tonhalle orchestra, and demolished sometime after. First mentioned in 1896 as Sechseläutenplatz, from the 1910s to 2008 the place was a meadow commonly known as Sechseläutenwiese. Since 1902, it was used for the spring Sechseläuten celebration and other events, including shows by Circus Knie. It also became the home of the Opernhaus Zürich and of the Grand Café Esplanade built by J. Pfister Picault in 1925. On 19 December 1941, the Bernhard-Theater Zürich opened as an entertainment theater for plays, farces and comedies in the Swiss-German language. To ensure the food supply of the city population in wartime, potatoes were planted in the meadow in November 1940. In May 1981, the Esplanade building was demolished and the present Bernhard-Theater was re-opened on 27–28 December 1984 after three years of transition. In the nearby Schanzengraben, the Old Botanical Garden is located. The area towards the Opernhaus-Bernhardtheater was used as a parking facility from the 1960s until 2008.

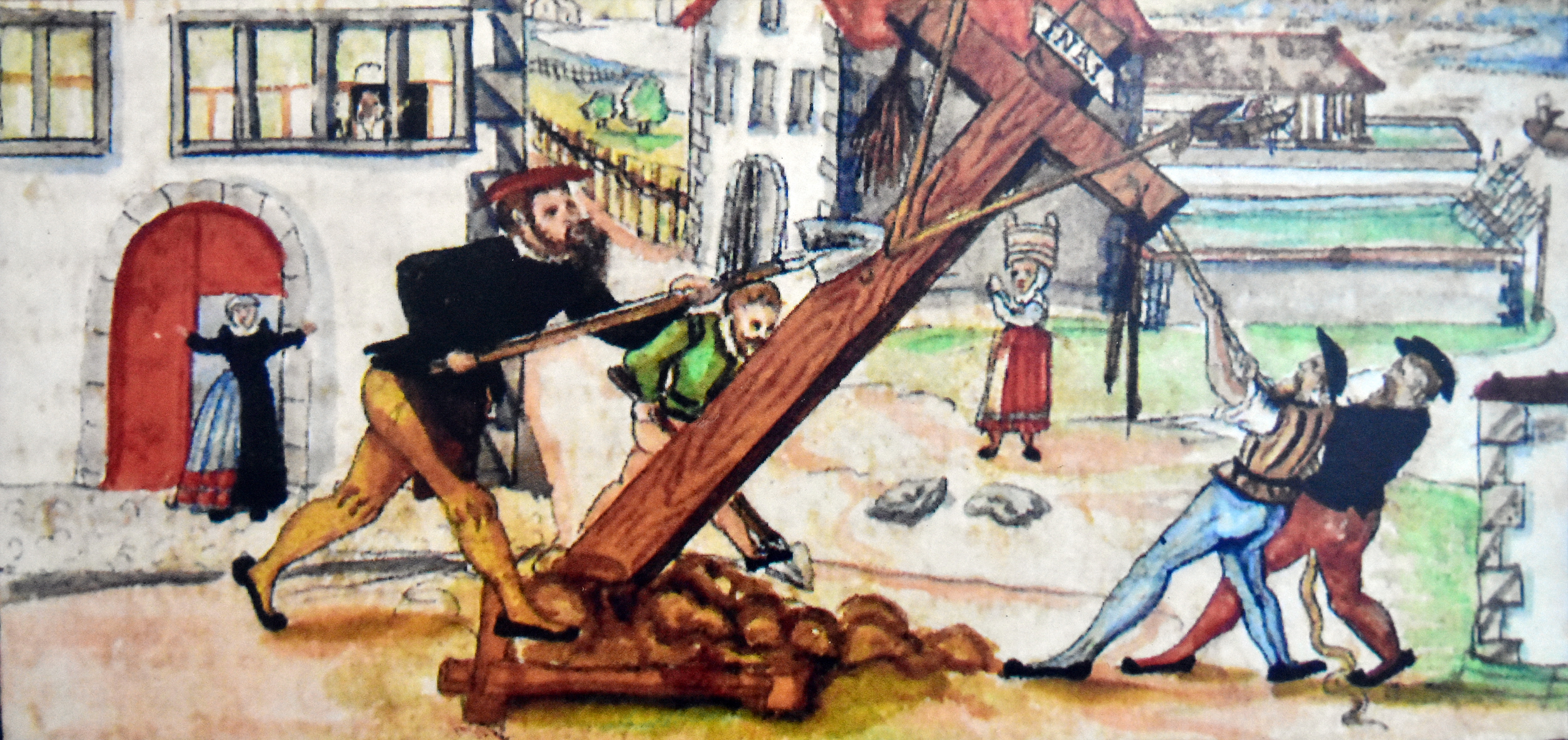
Iconoclasm during the Reformation in Zurich, Stadelhofen, illustrated Bullinger chronicle

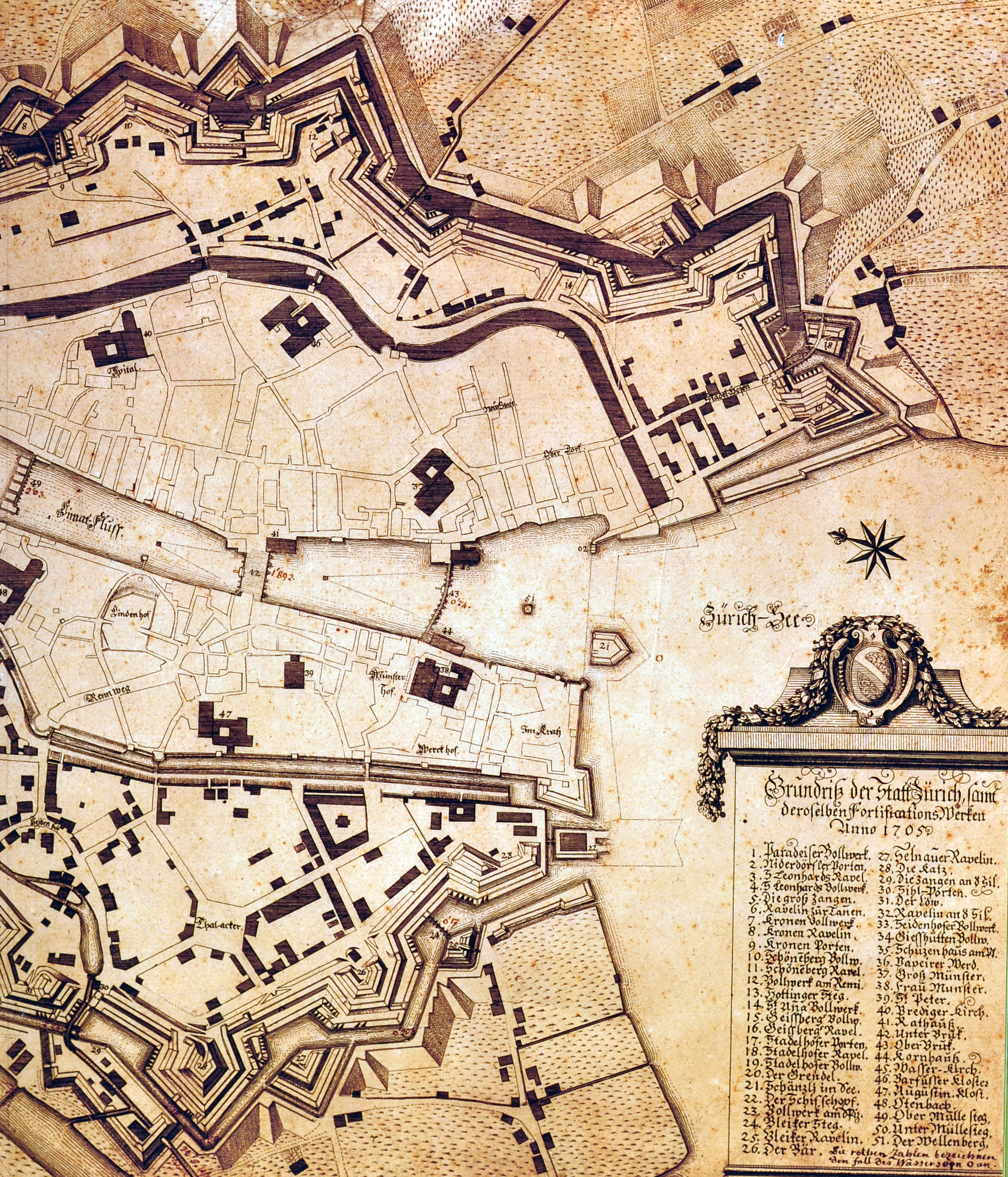
map of 1705

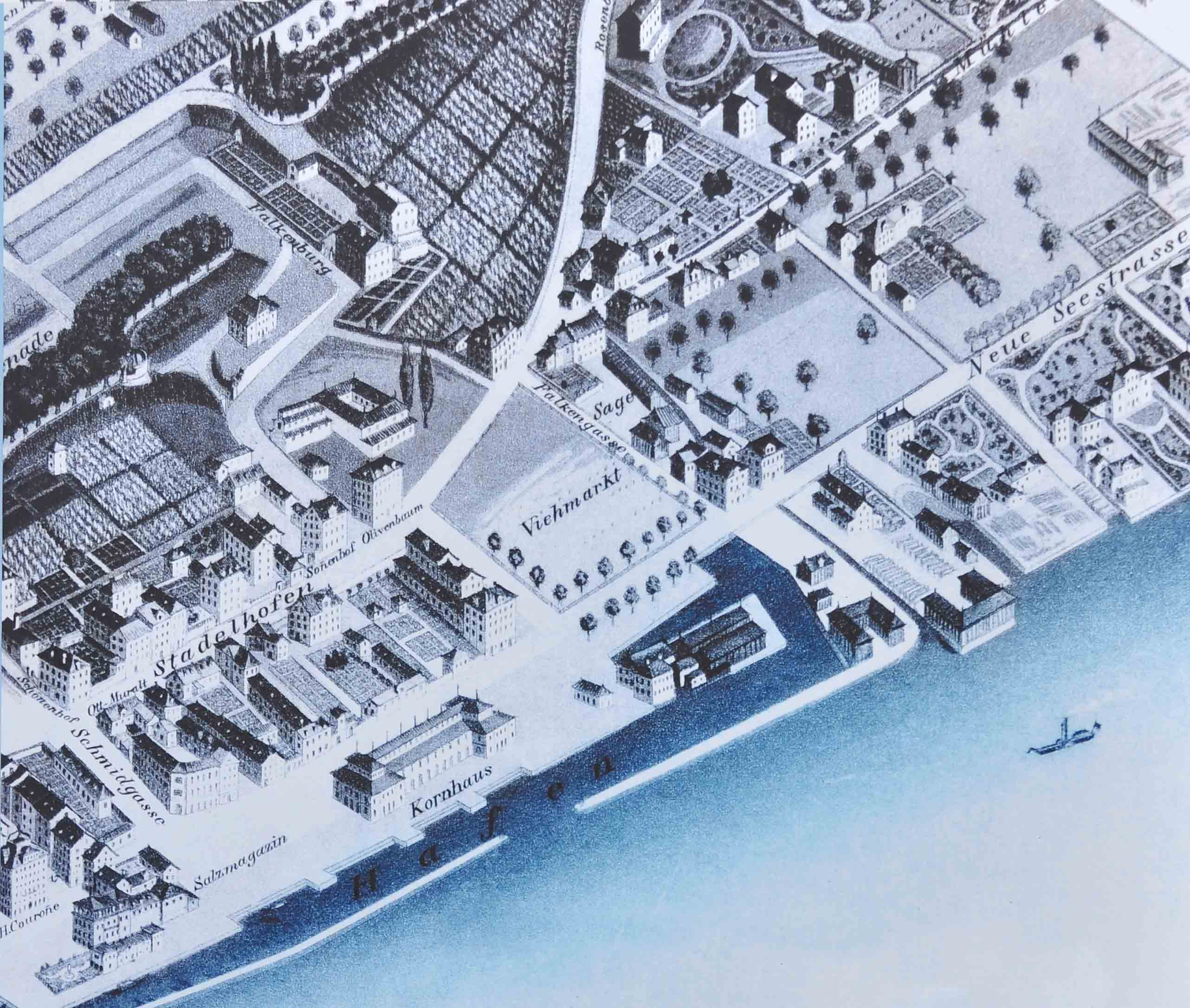
Stadelhoferplatz and former medieval harbour in 1846

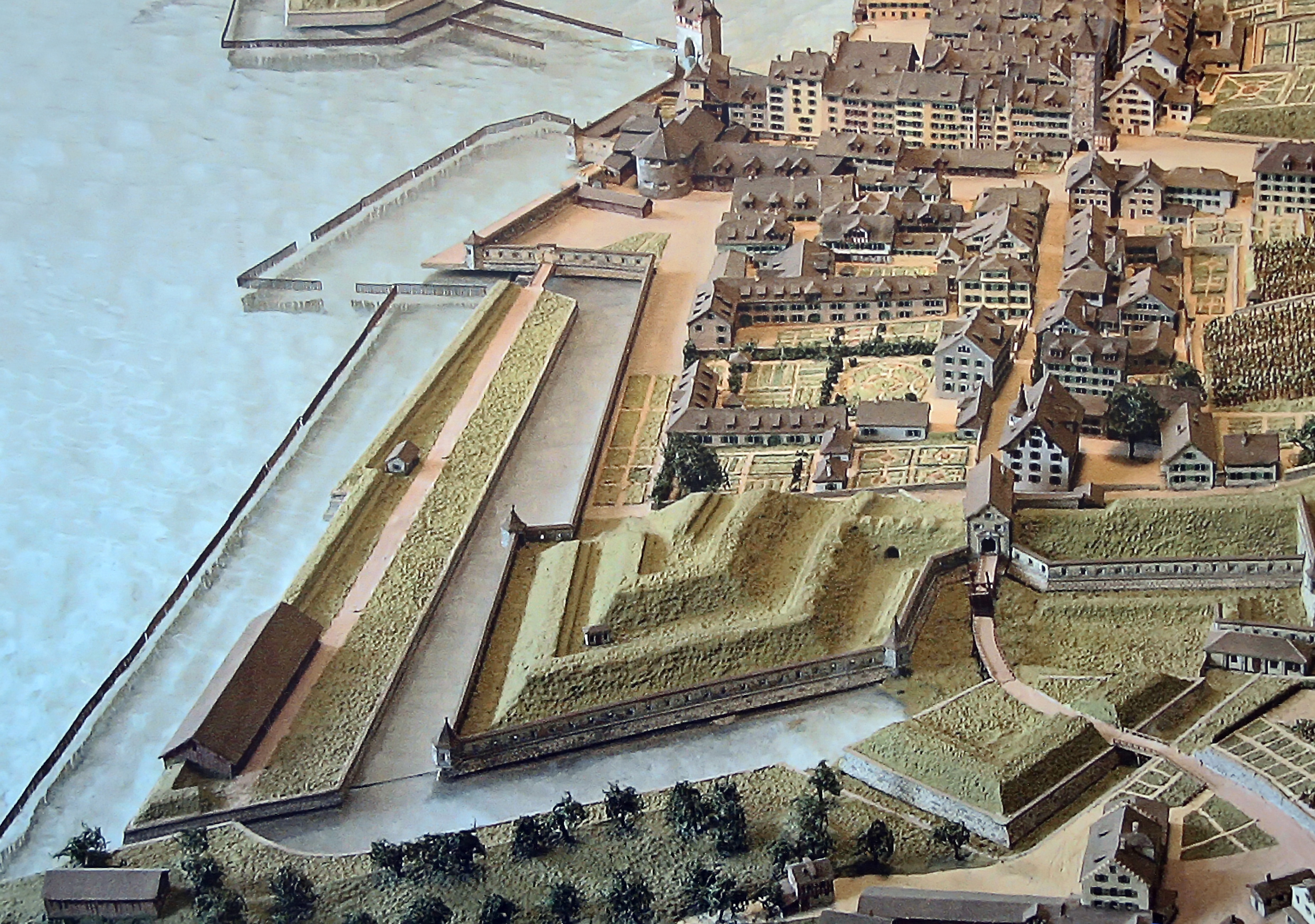
Stadelhoferbollwerk bastion

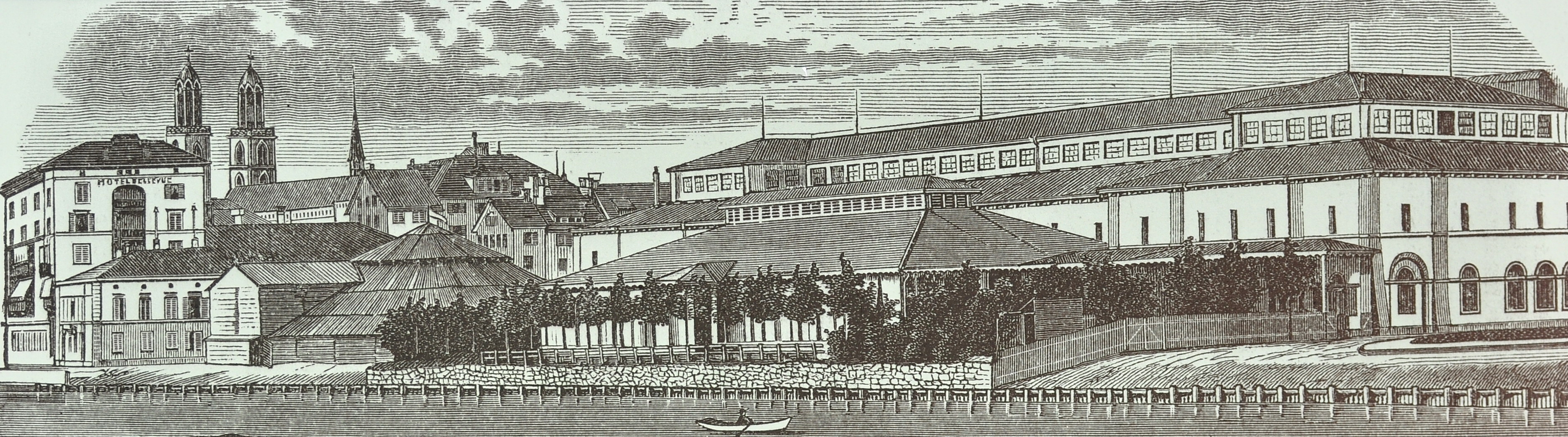
Tonhalle and lakeshore area in 1896

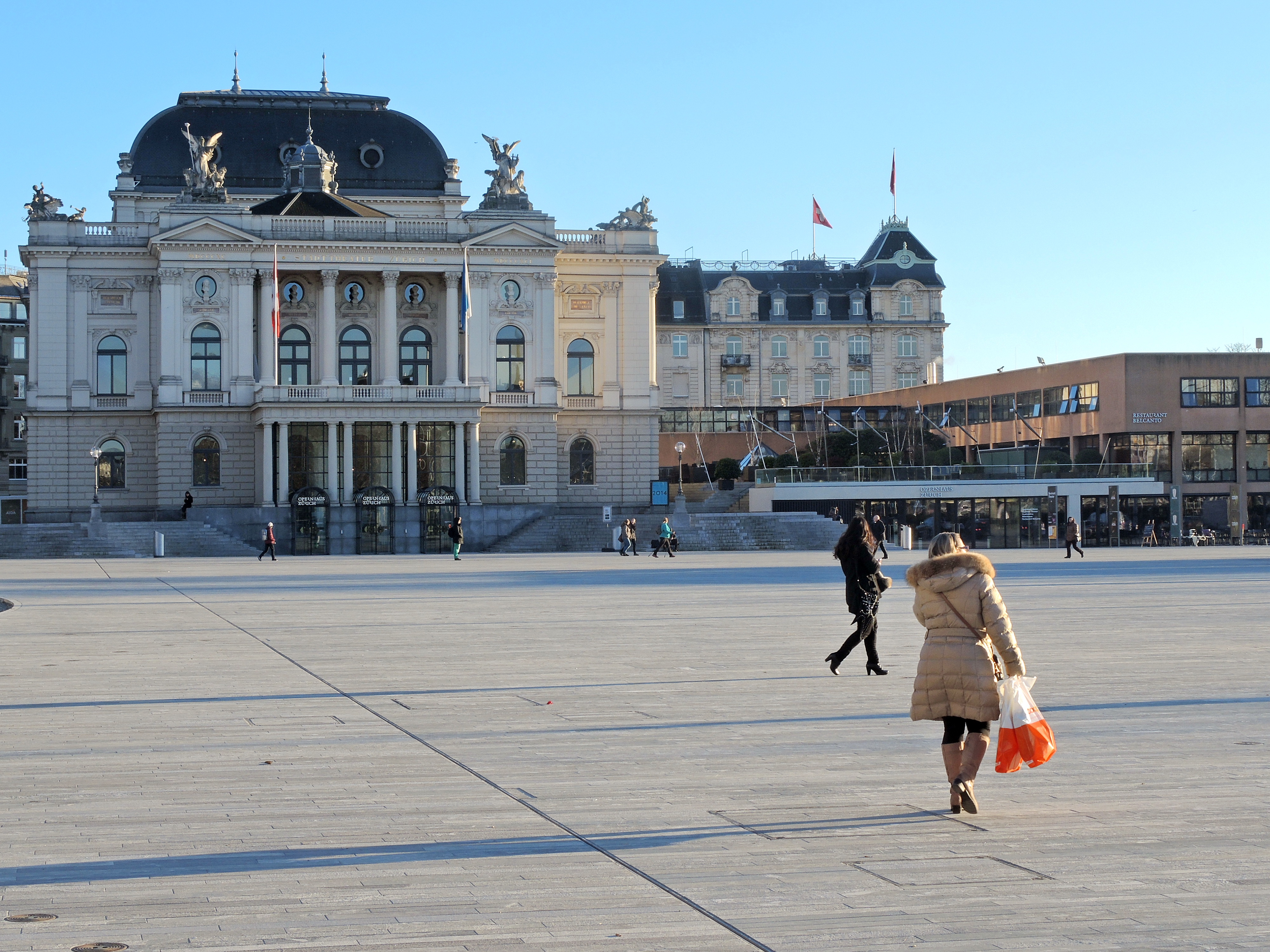
Opernhaus and Bernhard Theater

=== Redesign ===
Due to a referendum, the construction work was delayed a year from its planned commencement. In January 2013, the main work began and about a year later the redesigned Sechseläutenplatz was inaugurated. The cost for the city of Zurich amounted to 17.2 million Swiss Francs, of which CHF 10,250,000 were used on the renewal, road drainage and superstructure of the neighboring roads. The costs for the square's design and construction works totalled to around CHF 28 million, of which 11 million was paid by the canton of Zurich. The loss of a car lane on the Utoquai roadway caused a bitter dispute between the city and the canton of Zurich, with the district court deciding in favour of the city. The planning works were done by Zach + Zünd Architekten, Vetsch Nipkow Landschaftsarchitekten and Heyer Kaufmann Bauingenieure.

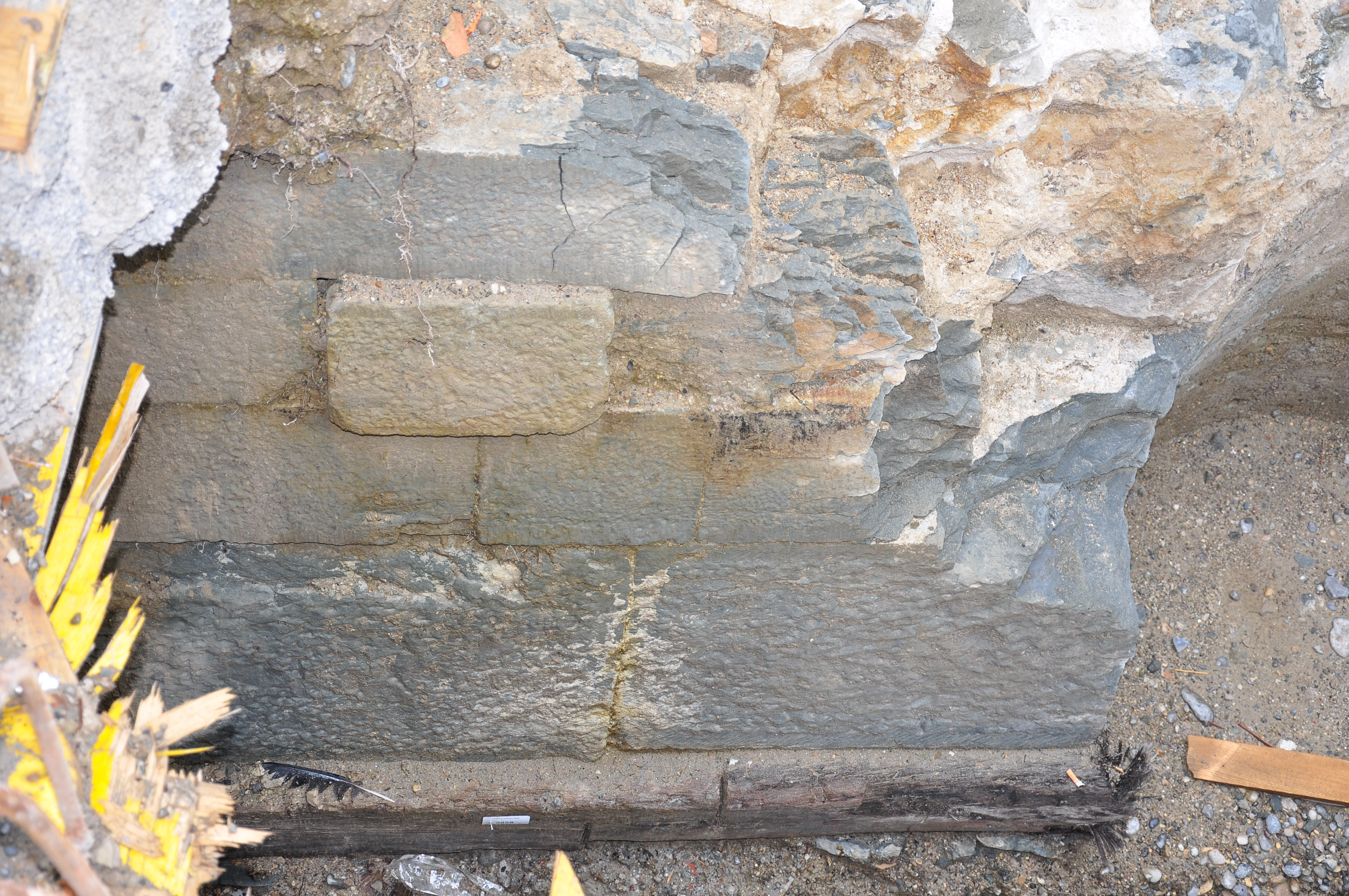
remains of Stadelhoferbollwerk, June 2010

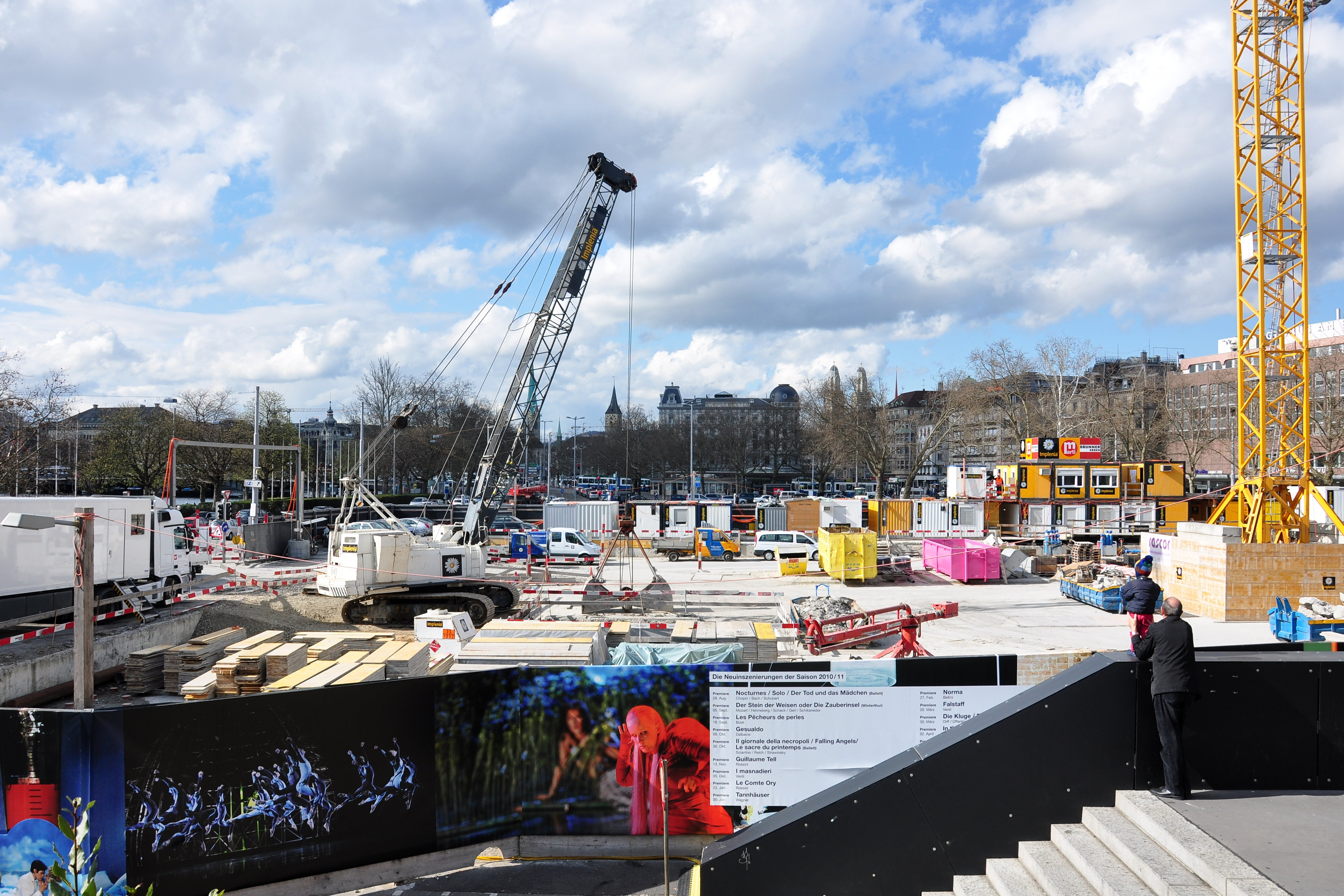
construction works in June 2011

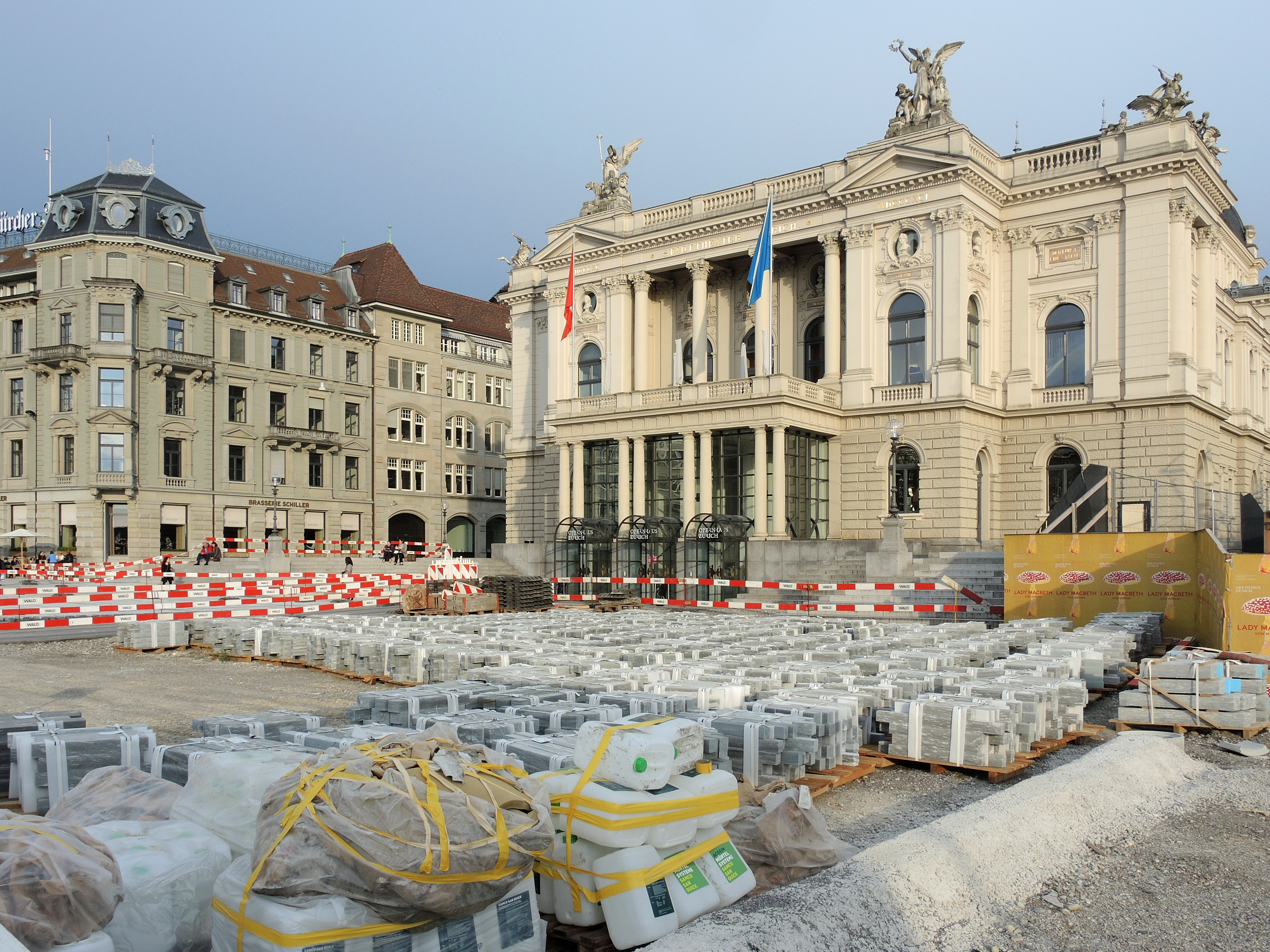
construction works in May 2013

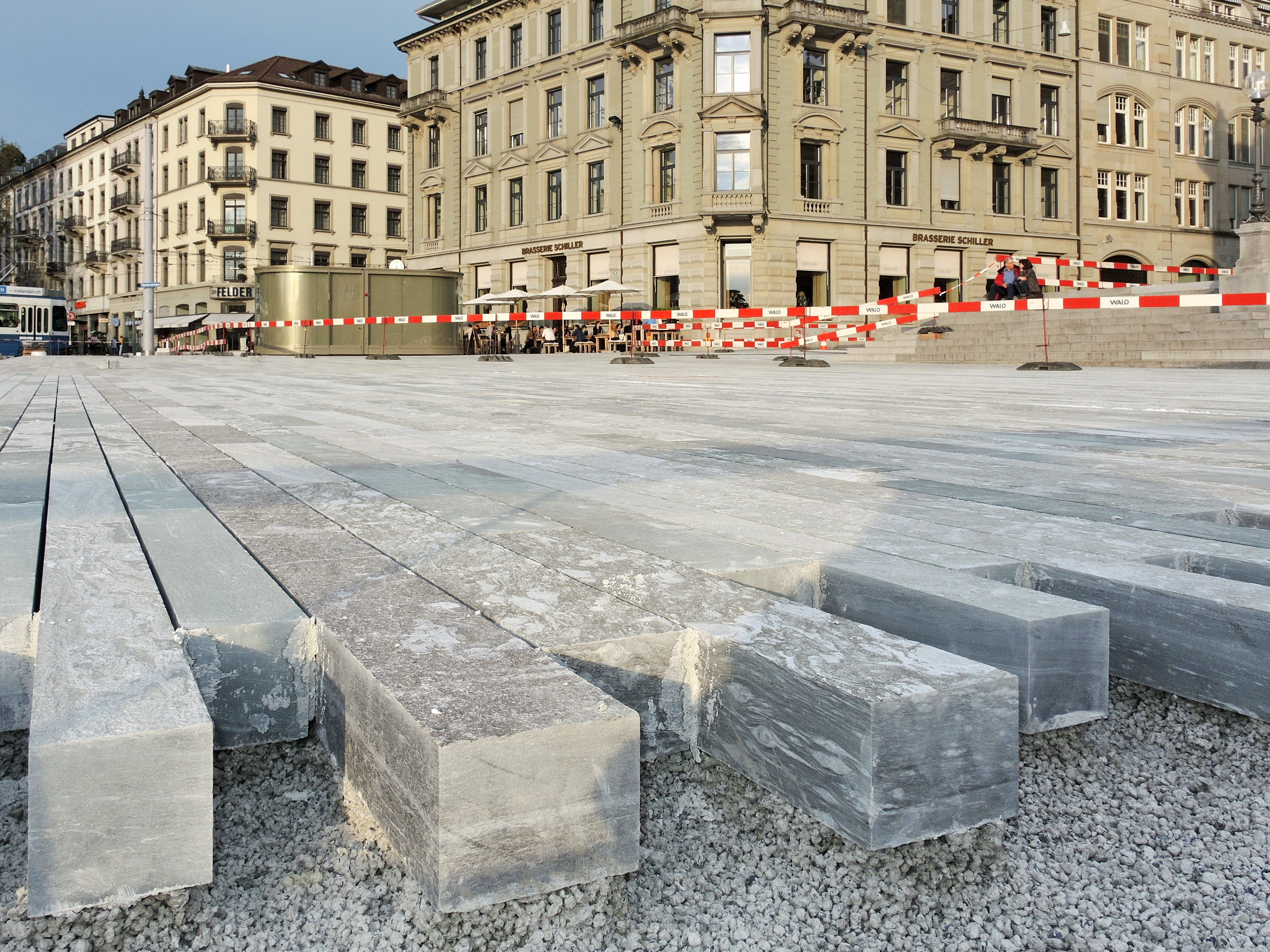
Vals quartzite

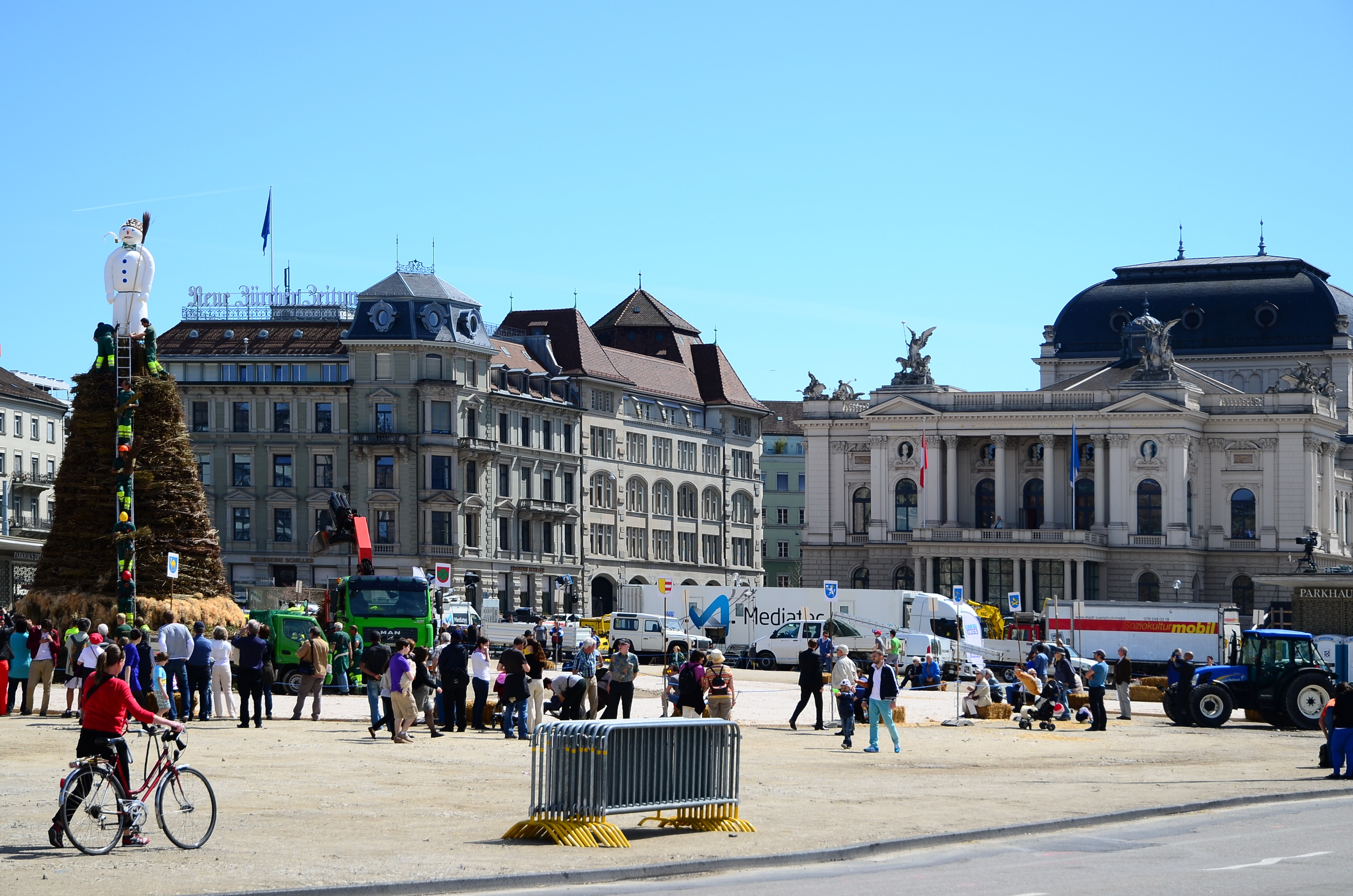
Sechseläuten on 15 April 2013

== Architecture ==
Surface parking was replaced by an underground parking facility, for the Opéra and the Münsterhof square, and the public square was expanded towards the Opera House. The aim of the city government was to "upgrade for pedestrians in Zurich at a central location, to create a place with international appeal". A total of 110,000 blocks of stone from Vals quartzite – 10 to 13 centimetres (5 in) wide and between 50 and 130 centimetres (51 in) long – form the square. The material was "thoroughly tested over a long period", with respect to cleaning, slip resistance or behavior during prolonged heat. To exclude damage on burning of the Böögg (a winter effigy burned during Sechseläuten), a shell of firebrick was installed. Additionally, the impact of elephant dung on the Vals quartzite was tested and anchorages for the Knie's circus tent firmly integrated in the surface structure. The natural stone tiles of the Vals quartzite occupies an area of 12,600 square metres (135,625 ft^{2}). The last stones were laid on 19 November 2013, three weeks earlier than planned. In February and March 2014, 56 seven-year-old red oaks and tulip trees were planted. These varieties were particularly suitable for the inner-city location.

== Infrastructure and fountain ==
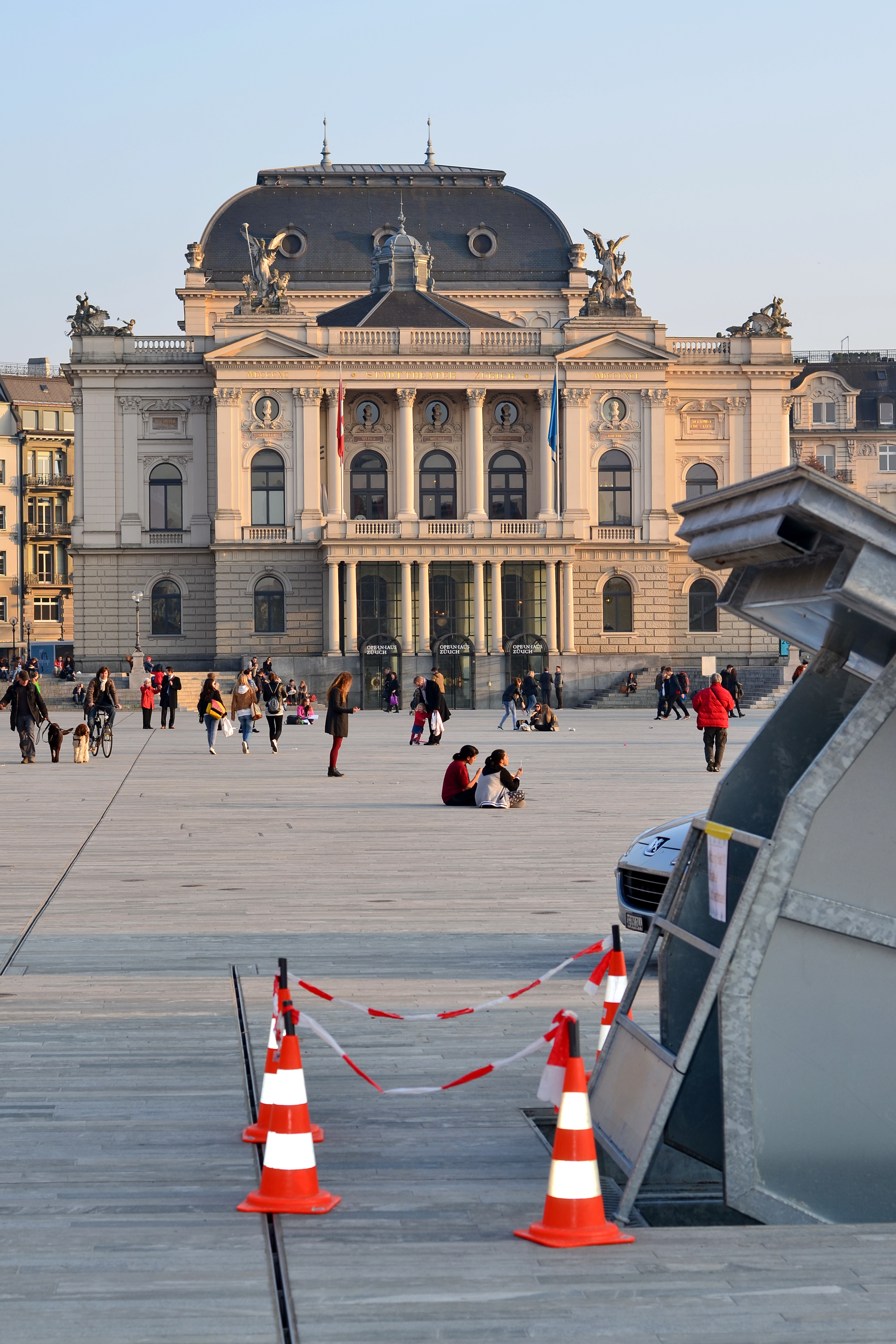
entrance to the underground infrastructure

Rooms under the square, below the groundwater level, provide the hidden infrastructure for lighting, electrical power distribution, and the pumps and control systems for the fountains. As of 2016, it is the most elaborate water feature in Zurich, with individual programmable control to each nozzle which can jet fountains up to 8 metres (26 ft) in height, and can accompany a piece of music. Each nozzle has a white LED light that can illuminate the water from below at night. Drainage systems receive the fountain water through a series of chambers which collect detritus, filter the water, and process it with chlorine and glass water; the purified water is then returned to the pumps to be reused. In all, 1.5 million Swiss Francs were paid for the design.

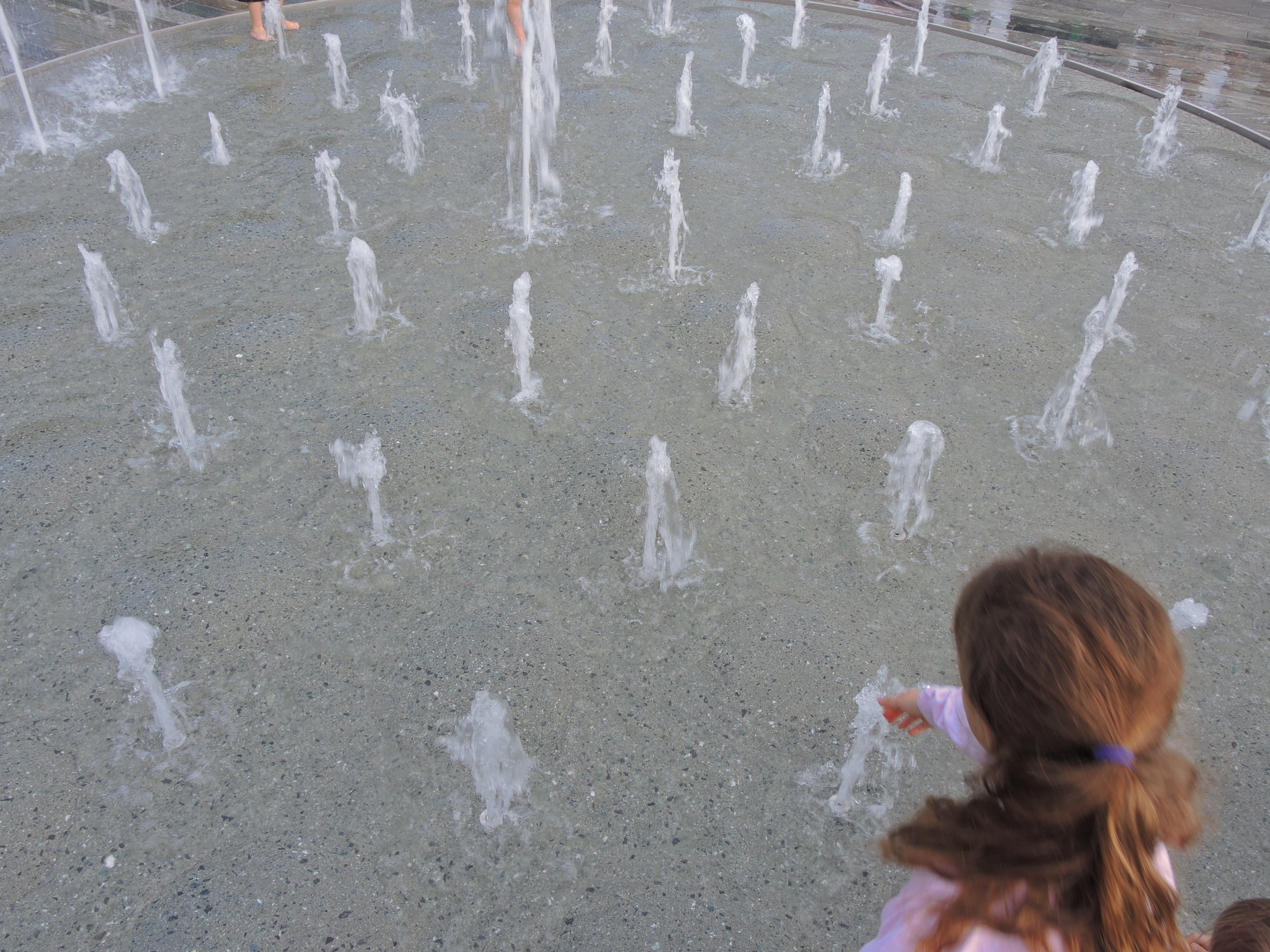

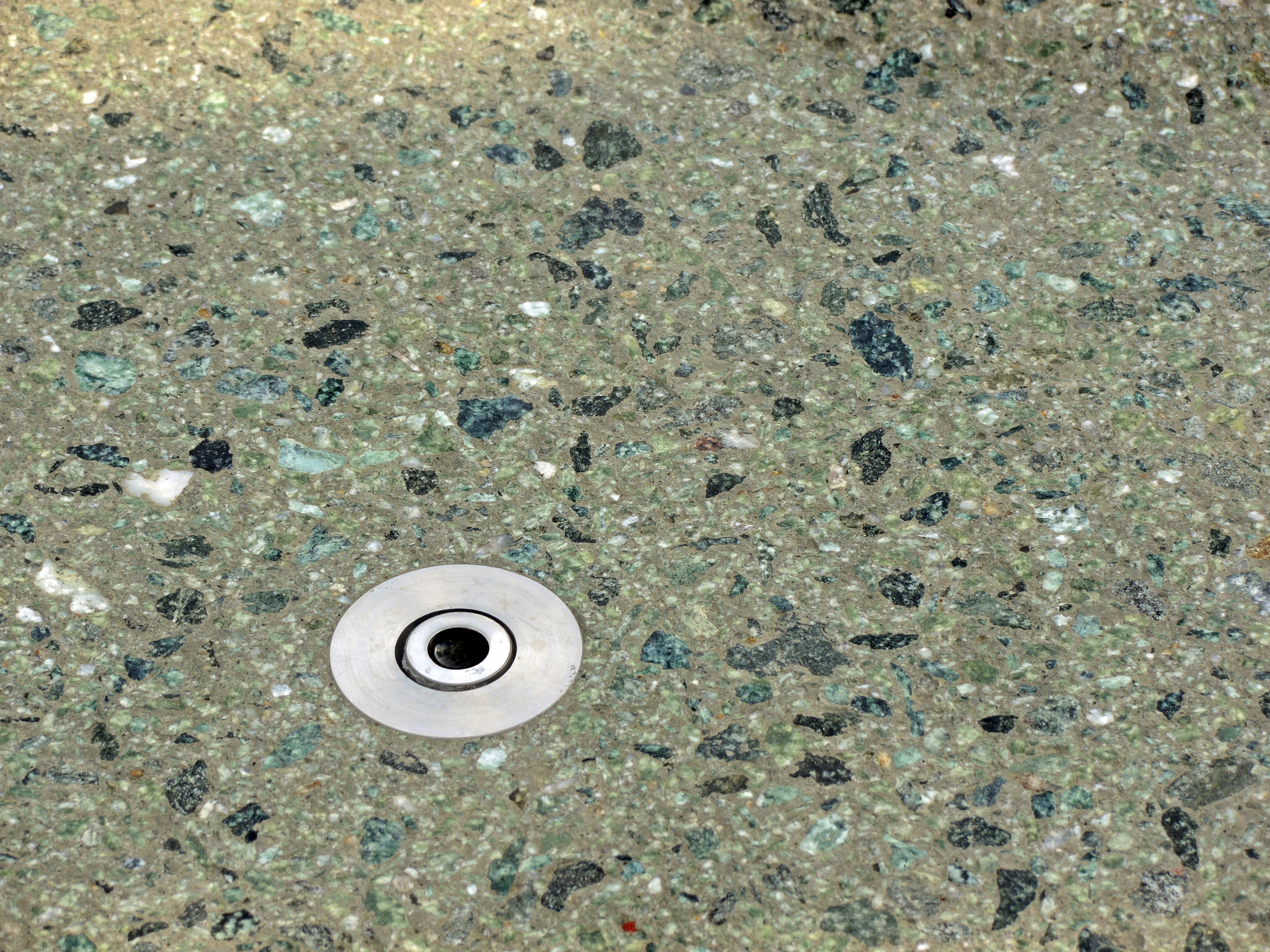
fountain nozzle

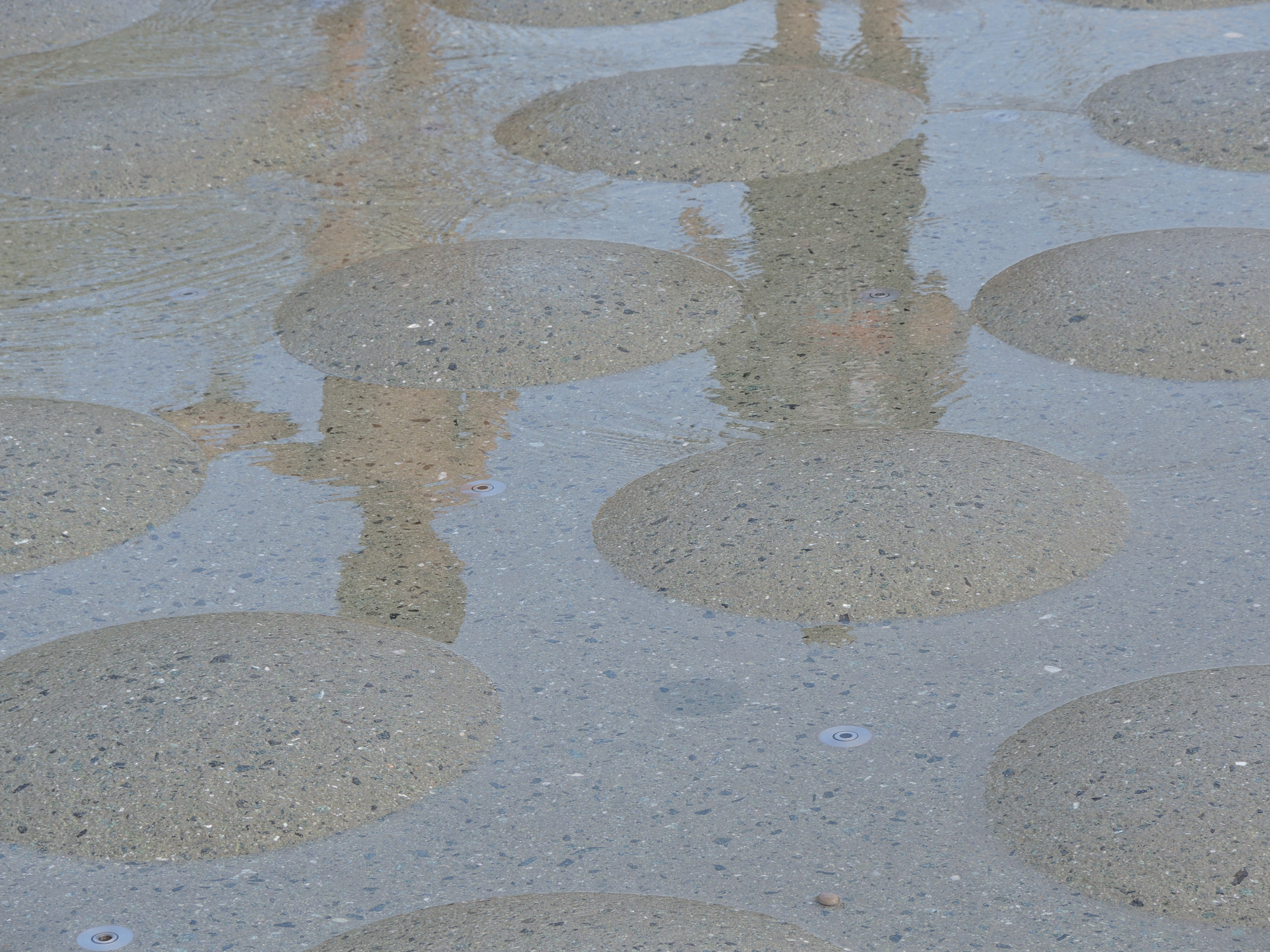

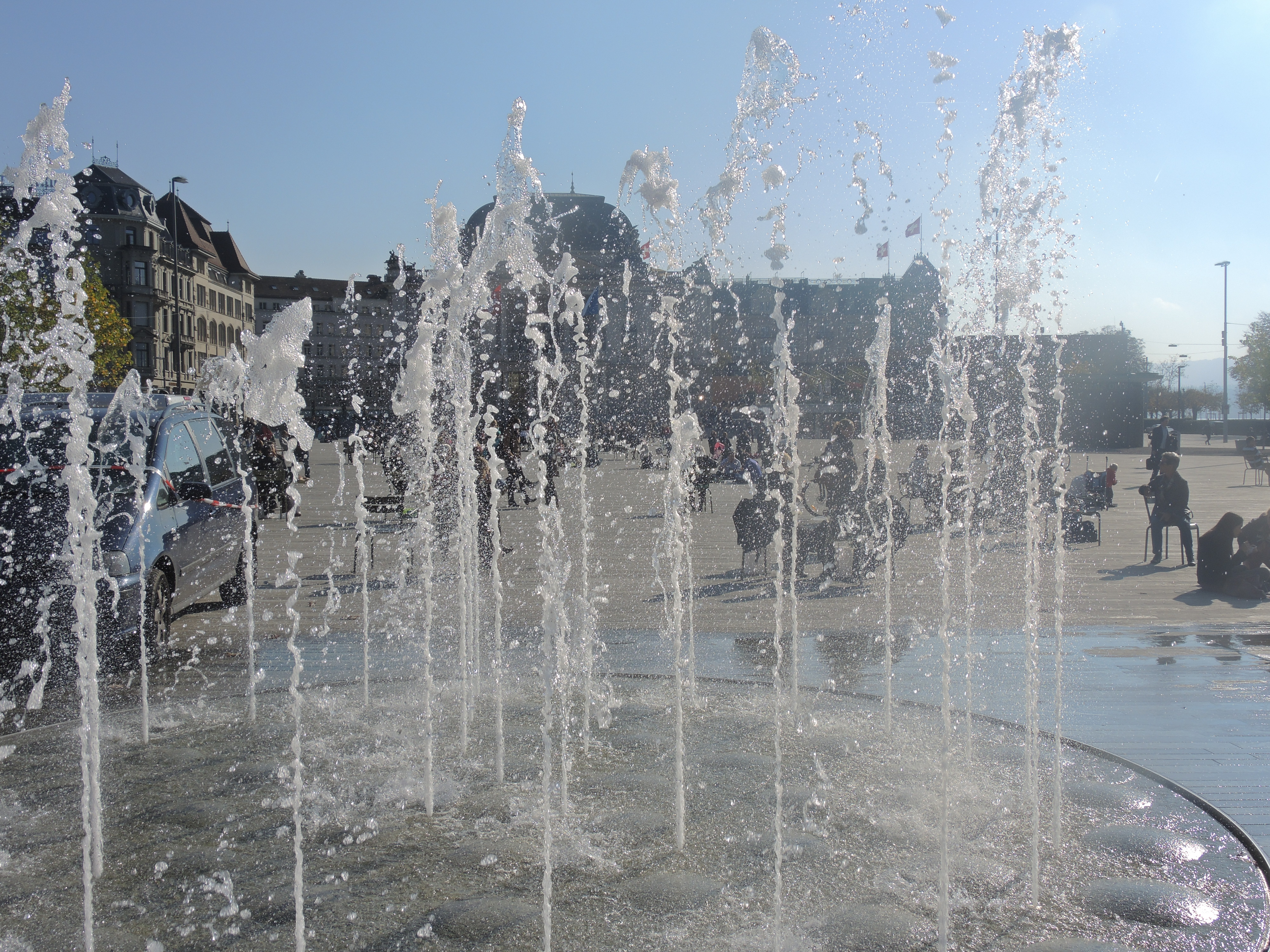

== Activities and sights ==
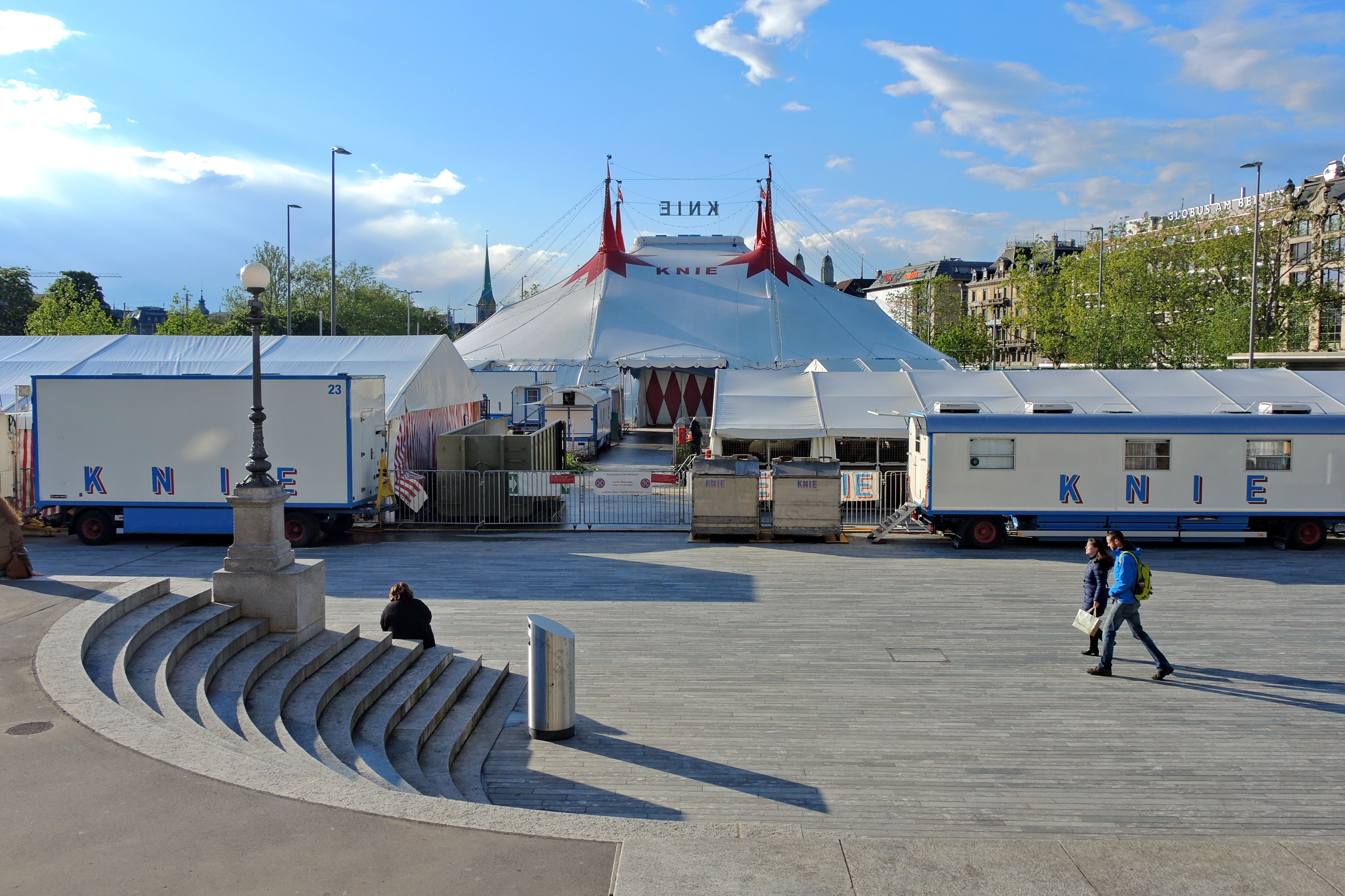
Circus Knie as seen from Opernhaus towards Bellueveplatz

According to the government's concept, Sechseläutenplatz may be used for events 180 days per year. Among them are Circus Knie, Sechseläuten and the Zurich Film Festival. In the summer months, the square must have full public access for at least 120 days to fulfill its function as the main inner-city space, so summertime events are limited to the area of the former Sechseläutenwiese. The former Theaterplatz square in front of the Opera House serves as the connection between Stadelhoferplatz and the Lake Zurich lakeshore. The city's authorities declared the area between Stadelhofen station and Sechseläutenplatz as a car-free zone. Wienachtsmärt, a Christmas fair, is a new event first held in 2015, opened on 19 November by Zurich's mayor, Corine Mauch. It had about 100 huts presenting modern design products and traditional handicrafts.

== Parking Opéra ==
Opened in May 2012, the underground parking garage houses two parking levels for 299 cars. The parking facility is operated by the Opéra AG, a consortium of the companies Hardturmstrasse AG and AMAG. Up to 50 parking spaces are reserved for long-term tenants. The entrance is situated at Falkenstrasse/Schillerstrasse. On Sechseläutenplatz, pedestrian access to the facility is provided by two pavilions, one of which houses a boulevard café. The second pavilion has a display presenting an overview of the archaeological findings from the excavation (Archäologie im Parkhaus Opera).

== Cultural heritage and protection ==
As part of the 56 Swiss sites of the UNESCO World Heritage Site Prehistoric pile dwellings around the Alps, the Neolithic, Celtic and Gallo-Roman settlements are also listed in the Swiss inventory of cultural property of national and regional significance as Class objects. Hence, the area is provided as a historical site under federal protection, within the meaning of the Swiss Federal Act on natural and cultural heritage (German: Bundesgesetz über den Natur- und Heimatschutz NHG) of 1 July 1966. Unauthorised researching and purposeful gathering of findings represent a criminal offense according to Art. 24.

== Literature ==
- Margrit Balmer: "Zürich in der Spätlatène- und frühen Kaiserzeit. Vom keltischen Oppidum zum römischen Vicus Turicum." In: Monographien der Kantonsarchäologie Zürich 39, Hochbaudepartement/Amt für Städtebau/Stadtarchäologie (Hrsg.), Fotorotar-Verlag, Zürich und Egg 2009, ISBN 978-3-905681-37-6.
- Dölf Wild et al.: Stadtmauern. Ein neues Bild der Stadtbefestigung Zürich. Schrift zur Ausstellung im Haus zum Rech, Zürich 6. Februar bis 30. April 2004. In: Stadtgeschichte und Städtebau in Zürich. Schriften zur Archäologie, Denkmalpflege und Stadtplanung. Volume 5. Werd-Verlag, Zurich 2004, ISBN 3-905384-05-1.

== See also ==
- Prehistoric pile dwellings around Lake Zurich
- Bellevueplatz
