= Nadja Sieger =

Swiss comedian and singer

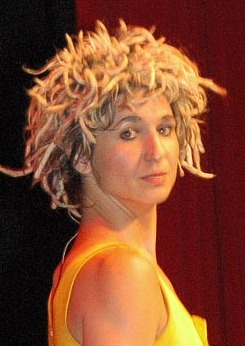
- Sieger in 2009
- Born: 22 May 1968 (age 58); Zürich
- Education: Kantonsschule Zürich-Enge
- Occupations: comedian, singer, writer, actress and producer
- Years active: 1987–
- Known for: Ursus & Nadeschkin
- Style: Kabaratt, comedian, Jazz vocalist
- Spouse: Christian Bossert
- Website: nadjasieger.com

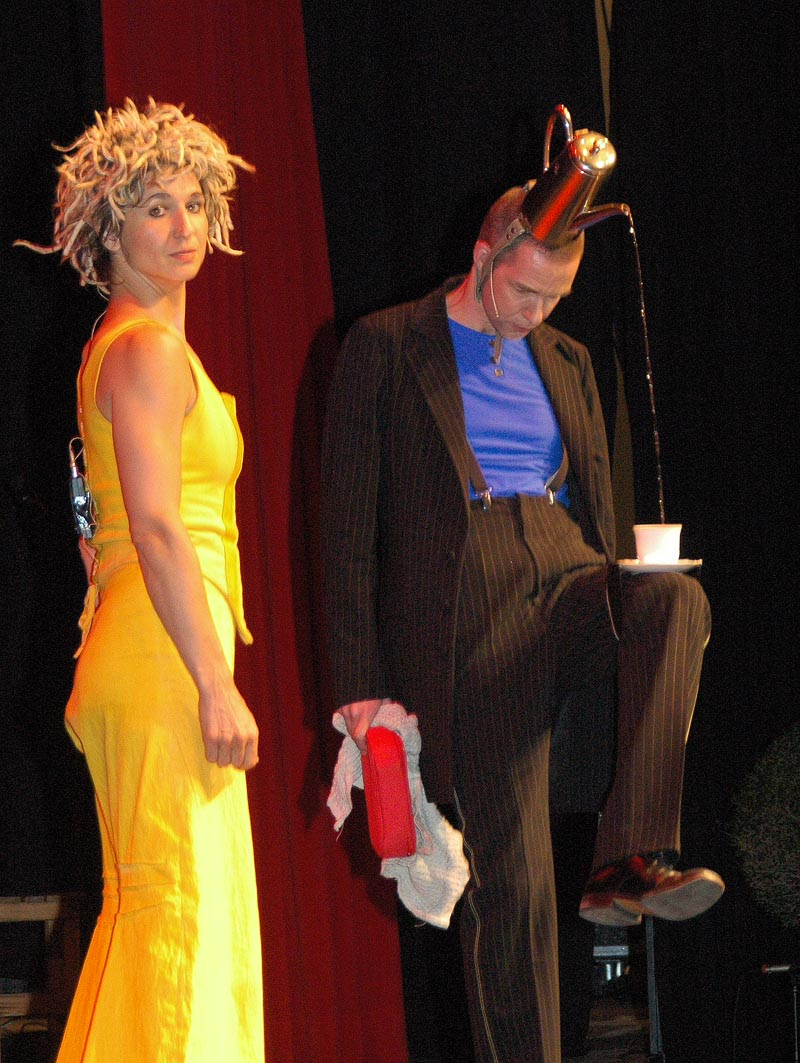
Ursus & Nadeschkin, Nadja Sieger to the left, in February 2009

Nadja Sieger (born May 22, 1968 in Zürich) is a Swiss comedian, singer, writer, actress and producer, better known as Nadeschkin of the comedian duo Ursus & Nadeschkin.

== Life and career ==
Born 1968 in Zürich, Nadja Sieger attended a Gymnasium in Zurich before she received the baccalaureate in 1988 (Maturität Typus B). She had been working as a street performer with Urs Wehrli, and has acted since 1987 as Nadeschkin. In 1989 Nadia Sieger toured with Karls kühne Gassenschau. In 2004 she featured in the Swiss television film Fremde im Paradies, 2005/2006 as co-author in a film not yet shown, as director in the independent theater scene and since 2005 from time to time as Jazz singer (Swing Time Dance ArchestrA, Big Band Connection and Swingtime Pocket Archestra). On 22 December 2010 Nadja Sieger's son was born. Just for fun, Nadja Sieger is member of the Lindy Hop Dancer. In 2013 Nadja Sieger acted as voice actress in the Swiss-German animation film S'Chline Gspängst (The Little Ghost). She wrote as columnist in the Swiss newspaper Berner Zeitung. In October 2014 Nadja Sieger was also involved as producer of the comedians Starbugs and director of their 2014/2015 tour. On 29 September 2016 the duo started its 30-year celebration tour.

== Ursus & Nadeschkin ==
Ursus & Nadeschkin started in 1987 as street performers, and in 2002 they became the leading act and headline of the Swiss National Circus Knie, performing 257 times during the 2002 season tour and having an audience totaling one million spectators. As in 2014, they acted in about 2,705 productions in small theaters, television, theater, circus and concert halls, so in Austria, Germany, Italy, former Yugoslavia and Switzerland, as well as in Australia, in the UK and the USA.

== Awards ==
- 1996: Scheinbar Preis Berlin
- 1997: Prix Walo
- 1999: Schweizer Kleinkunstpreis «Goldener Thunfisch»
- 2000: New York Fringe Award for best comedian theater, international Fringe.Festival
- 2000: Prix Walo
- 2001: Deutscher Kleinkunstpreis
- 2001: Award by the Canton of Zürich («innovative Theaterarbeit»)
- 2001: Salzburger Stier
- 2004: Leipziger Löwenzahn
- 2008: Hans-Reinhart-Ring award
- 2009: Swiss of the year, 3rd place («Schweizer/In des Jahres»)
- 2011: Publikumsliebling, Arosa Humorfestival
- 2012: Ehren Cornichon

as Nadeschkin of the comedian duo Ursus & Nadeschkin

== Selected filmography ==
- 2004: Fremde im Paradies (Strangers in Paradise, TV) as Flora
- 2007: Was gibt es Neues? (TV, Episode #1.101) as herself
- 2013: S'Chline Gspängst (The Little Ghost, voice actress)
