= Eastern Switzerland University of Applied Sciences =

- Ostschweizer Fachhochschule
- Type: Public University
- Established: 20 September 1999; 26 years ago
- Budget: 181.3 million Swiss francs
- President: Michael Auer
- Administrative staff: 2121 (924 FTE)
- Students: 3800
- Location: St. Gallen (site), Rapperswil-Jona and Buchs, Canton of St. Gallen, Switzerland; 47.4208°N 9.3634°E
- Website: www.ost.ch

The Eastern Switzerland University of Applied Sciences (German: Ostschweizer Fachhochschule, OST, until 2019 the Fachhochschule Ostschweiz, FHO), is a university (Fachhochschule) consisting of three campuses; they are located in St. Gallen, Rapperswil-Jona, and Buchs, in the canton of St. Gallen (Eastern Switzerland).

They are sponsored by the Swiss cantons of Appenzell Ausserrhoden, Appenzell Innerrhoden, Glarus, Schwyz, St. Gallen and Thurgau, and the Principality of Liechtenstein.

== Campuses ==
- St. Gallen Campus is in an urban environment, next to St. Gallen railway station.
- Rapperswil Campus (formerly University of Applied Sciences Rapperswil) located on Lake Zurich and next to Rapperswil railway station
- Buchs Campus (formerly NTB Interstate University of Applied Sciences Buchs) is nestled in the heart of the Rhine Valley

== See also ==
- Education in Switzerland
