= Willy Leuzinger =

Swiss cinema pioneer (1878–1935)

- Born: 4 May 1878; Rapperswil, Switzerland
- Died: 5 September 1935 (aged 57); Rapperswil, Switzerland
- Occupations: Cinema entrepreneur, innkeeper, filmmaker
- Spouse: Mathilde Hofer
- Children: 4

Willy Leuzinger (4 May 1878 – 5 September 1935) was a Swiss cinema pioneer and entrepreneur. Active between Lake Constance and the Gotthard, he operated several permanent cinemas and a large traveling cinema for which he produced short films documenting local events.

== Early life and career ==
Leuzinger was born in Rapperswil in the canton of St. Gallen to master wheelwright Wilhelm Leuzinger and Anna, née Heer. Originally from Netstal, the family was Protestant. Leuzinger completed his schooling and trained as a mechanic in Rapperswil.

In 1899, he married Mathilde Hofer, the daughter of Johann Jakob Hofer and Elisabeth, née Dietiker. The couple had four children: Mathilde, Wilhelm, Anna and Martha.

Leuzinger began working as an innkeeper in 1901 and became the proprietor of the inn Zum Hecht in 1905. A dedicated gymnast, he served as president of the Rapperswil gymnastics club in 1901 and as its coach from 1902 to 1912. He maintained close ties with gymnastics societies and counted members of the Knie family, a circus family based in Rapperswil, among his acquaintances.

== Cinema operations ==
Early screenings at the Zum Hecht inn are documented from 1909, though the first cinema evenings may have taken place as early as 1906. Leuzinger projected films at Zum Hecht from 1910 to 1913 before moving operations to the Schwanen inn from late 1913 to 1926. He then returned to Zum Hecht, converting it into a dedicated cinema hall named Kino Schloss in late 1926.

He also organized screenings in cinemas in Wädenswil (1912–1914), Rüti (1918), Buchs (from 1921), and during the winter months at the Tellspielhaus in Altdorf (from 1925).

After World War I, Leuzinger expanded his business by creating a traveling cinema housed in a tent. Between 1919 and 1942, it visited around 70 localities across 12 cantons in northeastern and central Switzerland. From 1923 to 1930, the operation used two marquees with seating for 300 and 600 spectators. The infrastructure, including projection cabins, was transported by train.

The enterprise operated under several names: Schweizer National-Cinema W. Leuzinger (1919–1924), Cinema W. Leuzinger (1925–1931), and Leuzinger’s Tonfilmcinema (from 1931).

== Film production ==
Between 1920 and 1929, Leuzinger and cameraman Georg Winner produced short films along the route of the traveling cinema. These were shown as supporting programs before feature films. Of roughly 100 films made, 75 survive, amounting to around ten hours of footage.

Apart from a few private family films and two feature-length documentaries about the federal gymnastics festivals in St. Gallen (1922) and Lucerne (1928)—which were rented to gymnastics clubs nationwide—the productions consisted mainly of short actuality films covering regional events.

The films recorded fairs, local celebrations, funerals and sporting events, providing early visual documentation of public life in the regions visited by the traveling cinema. Between 1998 and 2006, Leuzinger’s films were inventoried, preserved and restored as part of a project by Memoriav, the association dedicated to preserving Switzerland’s audiovisual heritage.

== Family business ==
The enterprise depended heavily on the work of Leuzinger’s daughters Mathilde, Anna and Martha. His son Wilhelm assisted only briefly for health reasons. By combining different exhibition formats—both mobile and permanent—the family provided rural communities between Lake Constance and the Gotthard with access to cinema.

While Mathilde, Anna and Willy focused on the traveling cinemas, Martha organized an extensive tour of the 1925 film Ben-Hur by Fred Niblo. Traveling by car, she and projectionist Ernst Fritz held more than 420 screenings in over 110 localities between March 1929 and May 1931.

After Leuzinger’s death in 1935, the company was taken over by his eldest daughter Mathilde. In 1980, the oldest cinema hall still operated by the family passed to Marianne Hegi-Strickler, Leuzinger’s granddaughter.

== Bibliography ==
- Lewinsky, Mariann: «Schweizer National-Cinema Leuzinger, Rapperswil (SG). Aktualitätenfilmproduktion und regionale Kinogeschichte der Zentral- und Ostschweiz 1896–1945», in: KINtop. Jahrbuch zur Erforschung des frühen Films, vol. 9, 2000, pp. 63–82.
- Lewinsky, Mariann: «Der Turnverein als Medium. Ein Album mit Filmbildern der Produktion W. Leuzinger», in: Cinema, 48, 2003, pp. 23–45.
