= Wicor Holding =

Swiss manufacturing company

Wicor Holding AG
- Type: Joint-stock company
- Founded: 1877
- Headquarters: Rapperswil-Jona (canton of St. Gallen)
- Website: http://www.wicor.com/

Wicor Holding AG, formerly Weidann (International) Aktiengesellschaft, is a Swiss company based in Rapperswil-Jona, specializing in the manufacture of electrical insulators and plastics. In all, it operates 30 sites worldwide and employs around 4,000 people. Sales in 2008 totaled 733 million Swiss francs.

== Activities ==
The Wicor Group is divided into two separate divisions: Weidmann Electrical Technology for electrical insulation, especially for power transformers, and Weidmann Plastics Technology for the production of plastics for the automotive, sanitary, sensor, and medical industries.

== History ==
The company was founded in 1877 by Heinrich Weidmann. He set up business in the Rapperswill municipal mill he had taken over. Alongside the manufacture of cellulose-based electrical insulation in flat or roll form, he developed pressed plastics for the electrical industry, mainly for high-voltage circuit breakers.

In the absence of a successor, the company was run after the founder's death in 1914 by former executives and citizens of Rapperswill. The company became a joint-stock corporation.

As a result of the First World War, export markets collapsed and the company teetered on the brink of ruin. In 1923, the company was taken over by a consortium led by Jean Tschudi-Klaesi, an entrepreneur who owned a company in Ennenda that manufactured special cardboard for non-electrical applications.

The company was restructured by his son, Hans Tschudi-Faude, in 1925. He definitively positioned H. Weidmann AG in the insulation and plastics segment.

In 1968, the company passed to Felix Tschudi-Hubacher, son of the previous managing director. He integrated the family's former factory, Tschudi & Cie. AG into H. Weidmann AG and internationalized the company.

In 1997, the Tschudi & Cie. AG cardboard factory was sold, and the buildings were converted to produce automotive components. Since 2001, Franziska Tschudi has been running the company, making it the 4th generation of the family to control it.
