= Chicago Faucet =

American plumbing fixtures company

The Chicago Faucet Company
- Type: Subsidiary
- Industry: Plumbing
- Founded: 1901; 125 years ago
- Founder: Albert Brown
- Headquarters: Des Plaines, Illinois, United States
- Area served: United States and Canada
- Key people: Fabian Huber (President)
- Revenue: US$270 million (2017)
- Parent: Geberit
- Website: chicagofaucets.com

The Chicago Faucet Company, often shortened to Chicago Faucets, founded on the near-west side of Chicago, Illinois, United States, has been producing faucets and other plumbing fixtures since 1901. The company founder, Albert C. Brown, invented the Quaturn Cartridge in 1913 that worked with the flow of water to make it both easy to open and close the spigots and forestalled leak development.

The Great Depression hit the company hard because of a decline in new construction. The company persevered by participating in the Chicago World's Fair of 1933 and briefly converted to the production of nuts, bolts, screws, and parachute hooks during World War II.

In 2002 the Swiss company Geberit AG acquired Chicago Faucet.

Currently the Chicago Faucet Company has its headquarters in Des Plaines, Illinois, and employs over 200 people in Des Plaines, Milwaukee, Elyria, Ohio, and Michigan City, Indiana.

Chicago Faucet has sales in the neighborhood of $270 million a year.
