= Geberit =

Swiss plumbing parts manufacturer

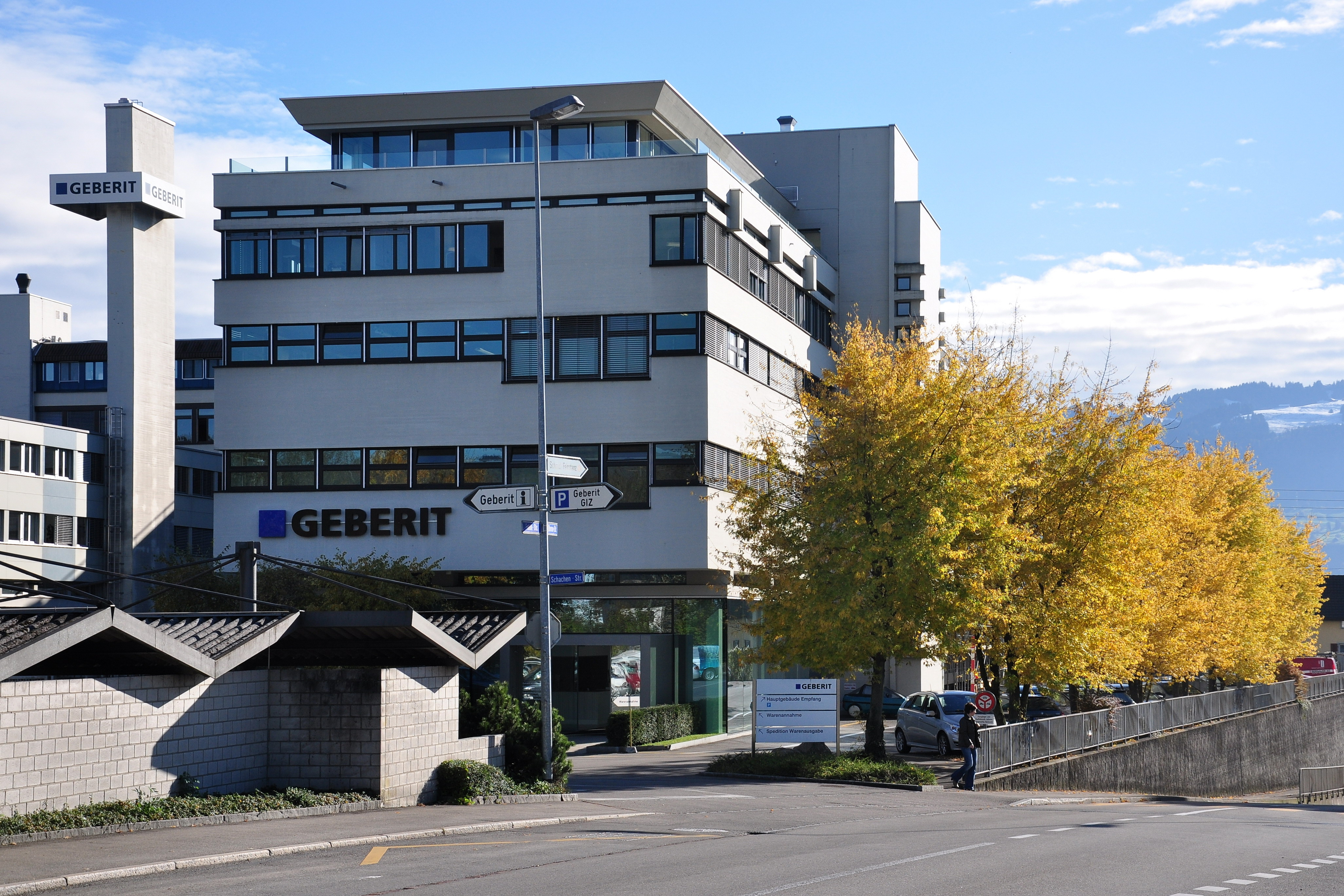
- Geberit headquarters.
- Type: Aktiengesellschaft
- Traded as: SIX: GEBN; SMI component
- Industry: Plumbing parts manufacturing and supplying
- Founded: 1874; 152 years ago
- Founder: Caspar Melchior Gebert
- Headquarters: Rapperswil-Jona, Switzerland
- Area served: Worldwide
- Key people: Christian Buhl (CEO); Albert M. Baehny (chairman)
- Revenue: 3.4 billion CHF(2022)
- Operating income: CHF 986.6 million (2022)
- Net income: CHF 977.63 million (2022)
- Total equity: CHF 1,922 million (end 2022)
- Number of employees: 11,514 (end 2022)
- Website: www.geberit.com

Geberit is a Swiss multinational group specialized in manufacturing and supplying sanitary parts and related systems. It is a leader in its field in Europe with a global presence through its subsidiaries.

== History ==
=== The beginnings ===
In 1874, Caspar Melchior Gebert started a plumbing business in Rapperswil (SG), Switzerland. In 1905, he began to manufacture parts. His toilet tank, the Phoenix, made of lead-coated wood and with lead fittings (particularly a flushing mechanism, the first of its kind), was revolutionary and a great success. When Gebert died in 1909 his sons Albert and Leo took over the business. In the following years, the company expanded within Switzerland as well as to neighboring countries, and added new products (pipes, taps and valves). In the 1930s, the company was a pioneer of plastic parts in the sanitary industry.

The Second World War set back the company, but it soon recovered and, in 1952, introduced the first all-plastic toilet tank made of polyethylene.

=== Expansion ===
In 1953, Heinrich and Klaus Gebert inherited control of the company and named it Geberit. The company opened a distribution subsidiary and new branches in Europe, which, besides parts, also offered technical services. As Germany was considered a growth market, the first international subsidiary was opened there in 1955, in Pfullendorf, which was also going to be the site of the first factory outside Switzerland. Since then, a number of subsidiaries were created in European countries, including France (1959) and Austria (1965). The company moved from Rapperswil to a larger facility in Rapperswil-Jona and introduced a concealed tank system.

In the 1970s, Geberit introduced more new products, such as full drainage systems, flush-mounted systems, and new components for the hygiene sector. A third plant was opened in 1972 in Pottenbrunn/Sankt Pölten, Austria. The company also created subsidiaries in Denmark, Belgium and the Netherlands. The company made an attempt to enter the American market, creating a subsidiary in Michigan, Indiana. However, the U.S. presence remained insignificant for years.

In 1977, the company entered the installation systems market, which went on to become the most important market of the company. In 1980, the German facilities were expanded and a warehouse complex was opened at its Rapperswil-Jona headquarters. It also acquired a big German player in the installation-elements market, Sanbloc. In 1986, it began automating its production. In 1989, it acquired a stake in FAE Fluid Air Energy, joining the fresh water supply systems sector.

In 1990, the facilities of Pottenbrunn were expanded. In 1994, a new plant was established in Lichtenstein in Eastern Germany to take advantage of the new markets after the end of the Cold War. In 1991, the Gebert family withdrew from managing the company and the first outsider was appointed CEO of the company: Gunter F. Kelm. The company continued its expansion, with new facilities in Rapperswil-Jona, a factory for its Mepla brand in Givisiez, and new international subsidiaries in Italy and Portugal.

In 1995, the Geberts sold Geberit to the British private equity firm Doughty Hanson. With the new cash, the company started a series of acquisitions, which included Italy's Deriplast and Walking Pipe Italiana, Germany's Buchler Werkzeugbau AG and the United Kingdom's Caradon Terrain Ltd. In June 1999, Geberit was listed on the SWX Swiss Exchange. In July 1999, it raised its stake in FAE Fluid Air Energy to 70 percent, with an agreement to take full control of FAE by 2001.

In 2001, the company suffered from the weakness of the German market, but soon recovered.

In 2002, Geberit acquired a majority stake in the Austrian company Huter Vorfertigung GmbH. In July of that year, with the aim of strengthen its position in the American market, it purchased Chicago Faucet at a cost of 33.3 million dollars.

In 2004, it purchased the leading German metal pipe manufacturer Mapress Holding from Lindsay Goldberg & Bessemer at a cost of 372.5 million euros. The Geberit share was included in the Swiss Market Index (SMI) in 2012. In 2015, Geberit acquired the Finland-based bath and toilet firm Sanitec for $1.4 billion.

== Strategy ==
Operating in more than 41 countries, the company manufactures and sells its products mainly under the Geberit brand, although some subsidiaries' brands are also used.

For a number of years now, Geberit has been pursuing the three-stage sales model and the push-pull strategy. More specifically, Geberit products are distributed wholesale, with the company training over 100,000 plumbers and decision-makers a year at its 25 training centers around the world or at external training courses.

=== Product areas ===
==== Installation and Flushing Systems ====
Installation and Flushing Systems products comprise all sanitary installation technology and the broad range of flushing solutions for toilets and is divided into the two product lines Installation Systems and Cisterns & Mechanisms.

==== Piping Systems ====
Piping Systems products comprise all piping technology found in buildings for drinking water, heating, gas and other media and is divided into the product lines Building Drainage Systems and Supply Systems.

==== Bathroom Ceramics ====
Bathroom Ceramics products include bidets, toilets, washplace solutions (sinks), as well as commercial products such as coverplates for urinals and concealed cisterns.
