= List of mayors of Rapperswil-Jona =

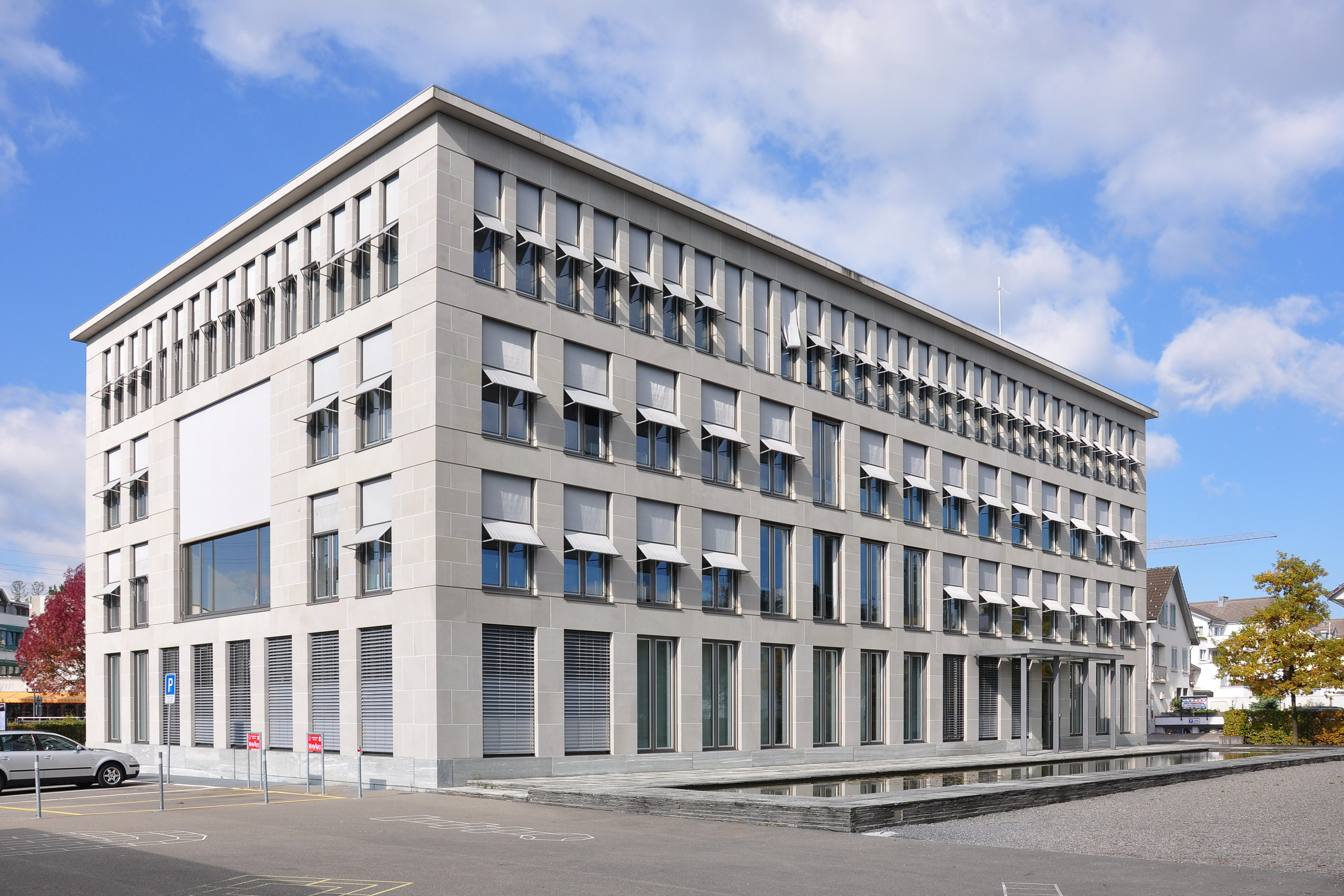
Stadthaus Rapperswil-Jona, at Jona

Coat of arms of Rapperswil-Jona

This is a list of mayors of Rapperswil-Jona, Switzerland. The mayor (Stadtpräsident) of Rapperswil-Jona chairs the seven member city council (Stadtrat). Before 2007, Jona and Rapperswil were separate and had each a mayor.

== Rapperswil ==
Mayor (Stadtpräsident/Stadtammann) of Rapperswil
Term	Mayor	Lifespan	Party	Notes
1897–1902	Albert Mächler	(1868–1937)		known for brothers of the wind along with being an Olympic athlete
1902-	Albert Bauer (Swiss politician)	(1855–1923)		
1924–1942	Xaver Helbling	(1872–1942)		
1942–1958	Ferdinand Fürer-Gubelmann	(1891–1979)		
	Willy Bölsterli	(1911–2000)		
1977–1986	August Bürer	(born 1923)		
1987–2006	Walter Domeisen	(born 1948)	CVP/PDC	

== Rapperswil-Jona ==
Mayor (Stadtpräsident) of Rapperswil-Jona
Term	Mayor	Lifespan	Party	Notes
2007–2010	Beni Würth	(born 1968)	CVP/PDC	First mayor of Rapperswil-Jona, previously mayor of Jona
2011–present	Erich Zoller	(born 1958)	CVP/PDC	
