= Sanitec =

Sanitec Oy (data valid until the acquisition by Geberit)
- Company type: Public limited company
- Industry: bathroom ceramics
- Founded: 1990 (as a Wärtsilä subsidiary); 1999 (listed on the Helsinki stock Exchange)
- Fate: Acquired by Geberit
- Headquarters: Helsinki, Finland
- Key people: Fredrik Cappelen (Chairman); Peter Nilsson (President and CEO)
- Products: bathroom ceramics, bathroom furniture pre-wall flushing solutions taps & mixers bathtubs, showers
- Revenue: €752.8 million (2012)
- Operating income: €73 million (2012)
- Number of employees: 7,004(2012)
- Subsidiaries: Allia, IDO, Ifö, Keramag; Kolo, Koralle, Porsgrund; Pozzi-Ginori, Selles; Sphinx, Twyford Bathrooms; Varicor
- Website: www.sanitec.com

Sanitec was a large European producer of sanitaryware. It was based in Helsinki, owned by the Swedish private equity firm EQT (has been owning 77.5% of Sanitec since 2009, 100% 2005–2009) and owned several European ceramics brands with 18 production plants. Annual revenue in 2012 was €753 million.

== History ==
Sanitec was established as a subsidiary of Wärtsilä in 1990. In 1999 Sanitec was listed on the Helsinki stock exchange. It was delisted on 1 November 2001 after being acquired by Pool Acquisition Helsinki Oy, a company Sanitec merged with on 31 March 2002. In the beginning of 2005 the merged company was completely acquired by EQT.

In February 2015, Sanitec was acquired by the Swiss firm Geberit for $US1.4 billion.

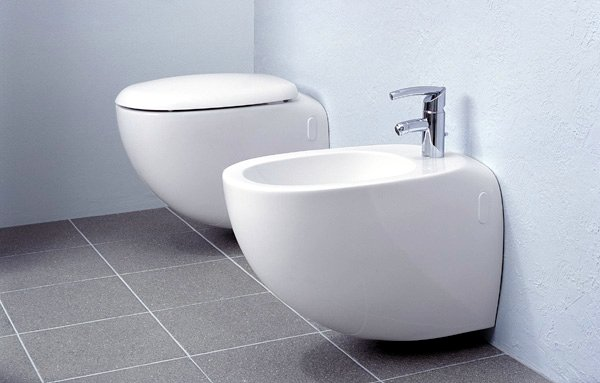
Bidet by Kolo, a Sanitec subsidiary

== Brands (year acquisition by Sanitec) ==
Sources:

- Allia, France (1991)
- IDO, Finland
- Ifö, Sweden (1981)
- Keramag, Germany (1991)
- Kolo, Poland (1993)
- Koralle, Germany
- Leda, France (sold in 2012 Nov.)
- Porsgrund, Norway (1985)
- Pozzi-Ginori, Italy (1993)
- Selles, France
- Sphinx, Netherlands (1999)
- Twyford Bathrooms, United Kingdom (2001)
- Varicor, Germany (1998)
