= Hochschule für Technik Rapperswil =

HSR
- Former names: Interkantonales Technikum Rapperswil
- Type: Public
- Established: 1972
- Budget: CHF 85.368 Million
- Rector: Margit Mönnecke
- Academic staff: 510
- Administrative staff: 140
- Students: 1600
- Location: Rapperswil-Jona, St. Gallen (canton), Switzerland; 47°13′25.00″N 8°49′05.00″E
- Campus: Urban

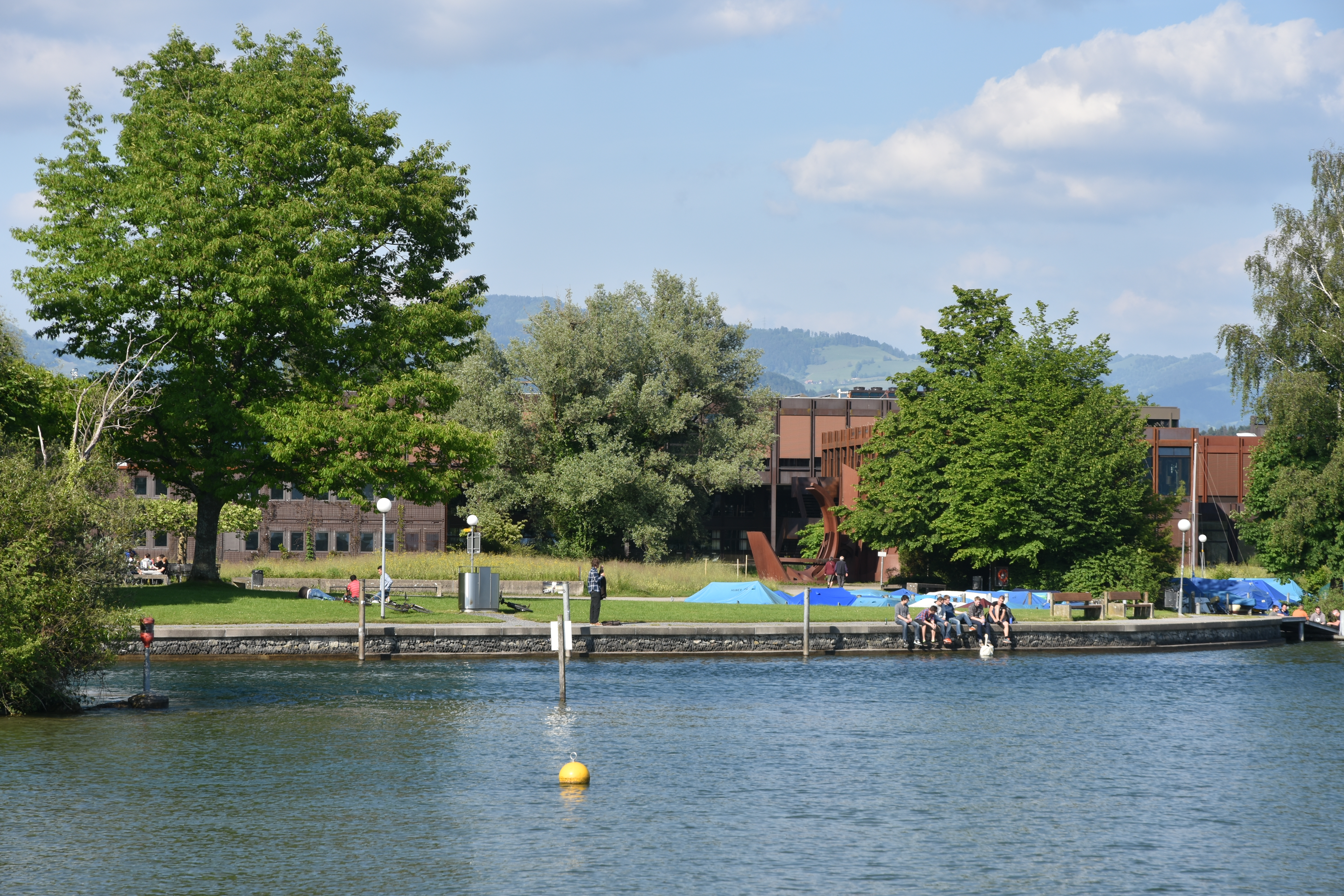
HSR on Obersee lakeshore

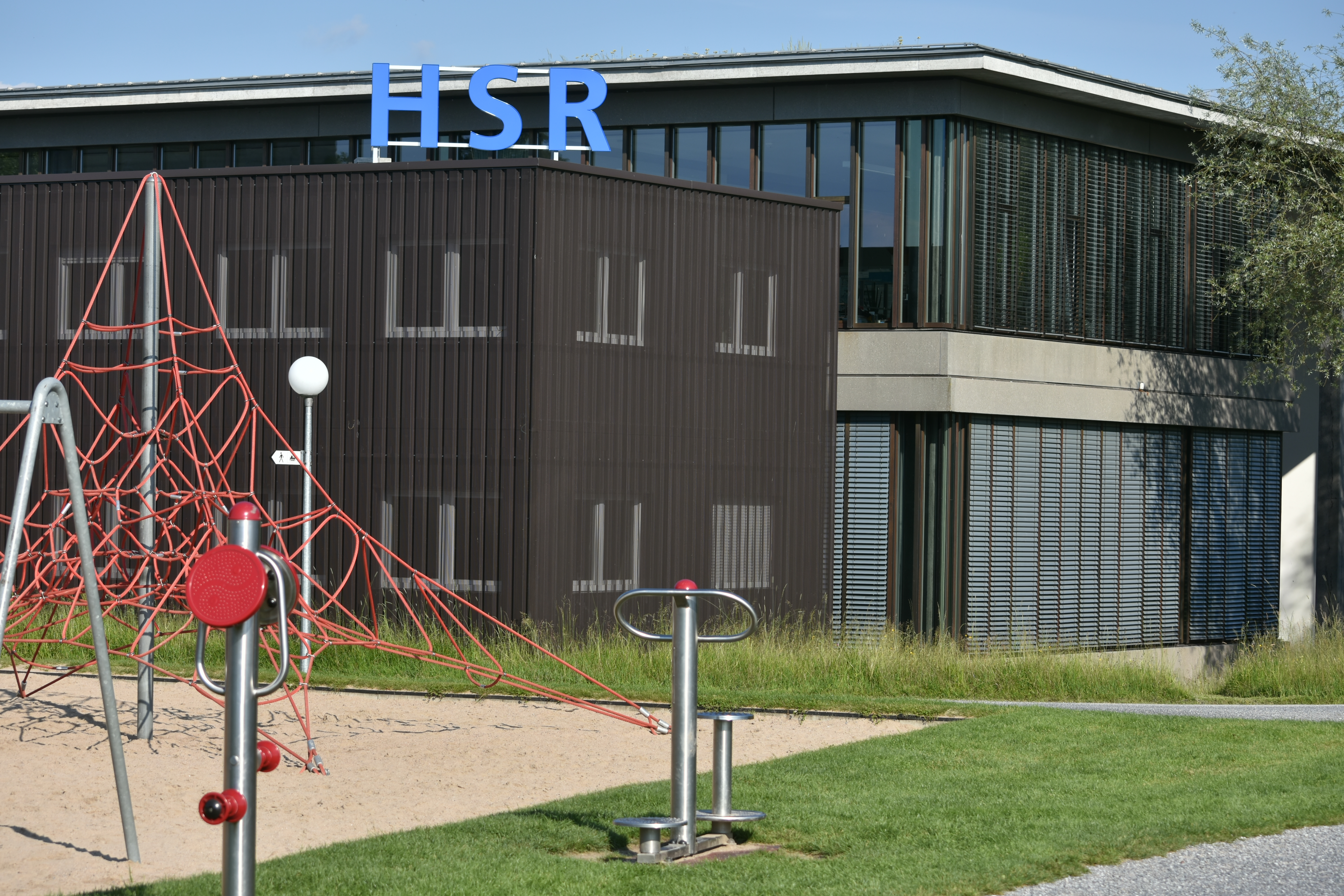

The Hochschule für Technik Rapperswil (University of Applied Sciences Rapperswil), also called Technikum or HSR, was a technical university in Rapperswil-Jona, Switzerland. Since 2020 the former HSR is the Campus Rapperswil-Jona of the new OST – Ostschweizer Fachhochschule.

The university campus is located in Rapperswil at the lakeshore of the Obersee, which is the southeastern part of Lake Zurich. The Seedamm, the Rapperswil railway station and Knie's Kinderzoo are in the vicinity.

== Trivia ==
Remains of pile dwellings have been found at the archaeological site Technikum, which is part of the UNESCO World Heritage Prehistoric Pile dwellings around the Alps.

== See also ==
- List of largest universities by enrollment in Switzerland
- List of universities in Switzerland
