= Rapperswil-Jona =

- Municipality
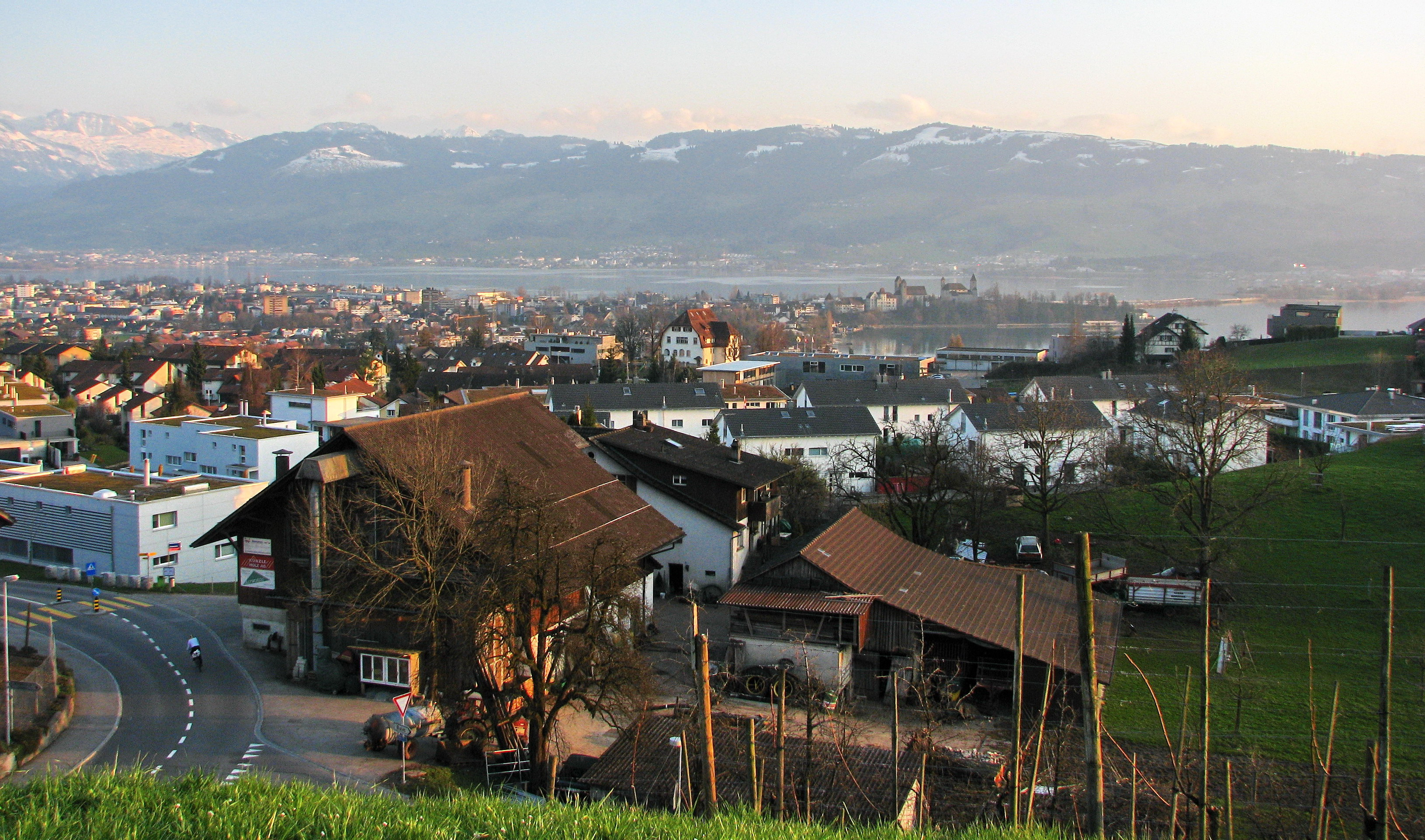
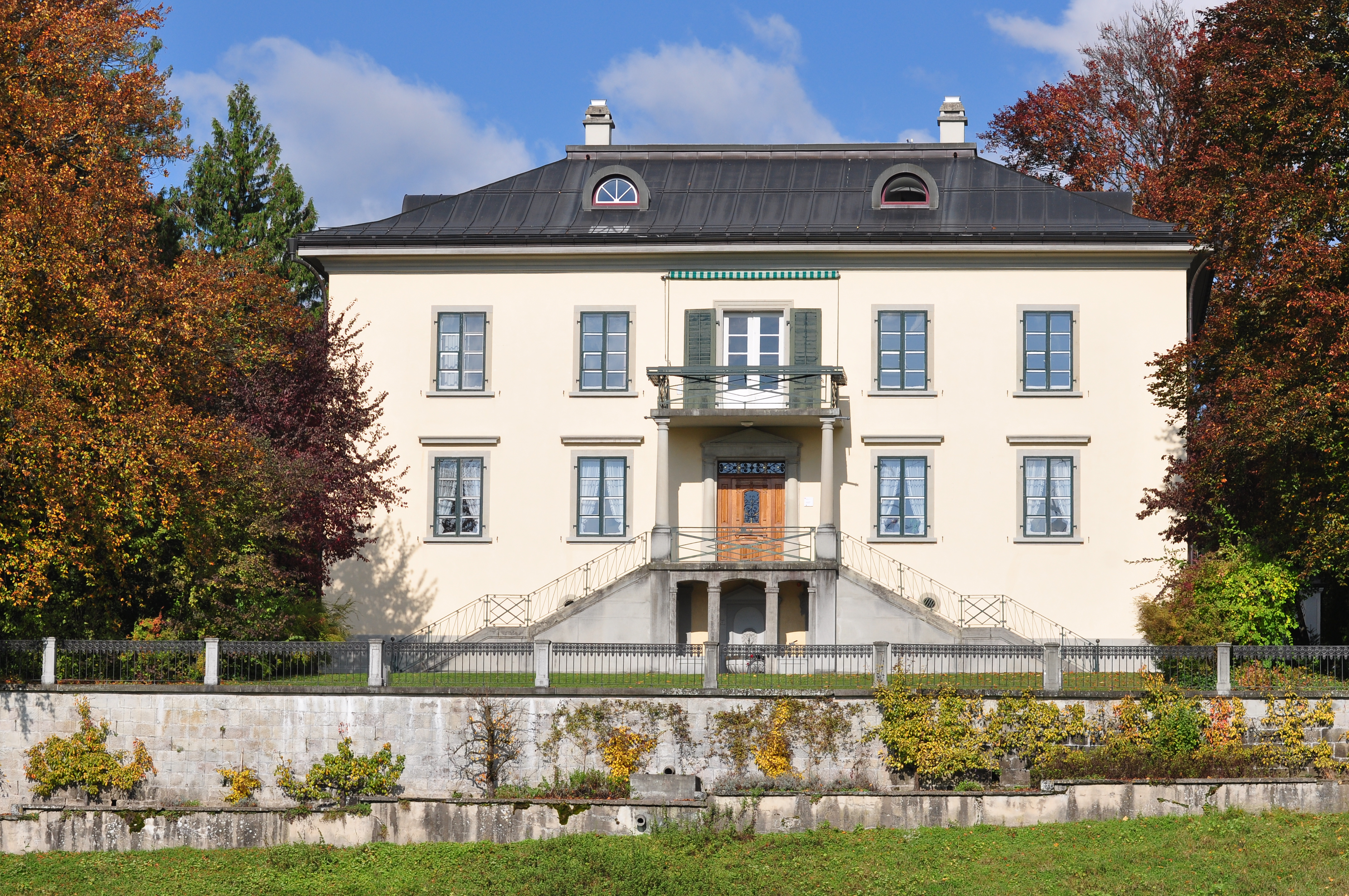
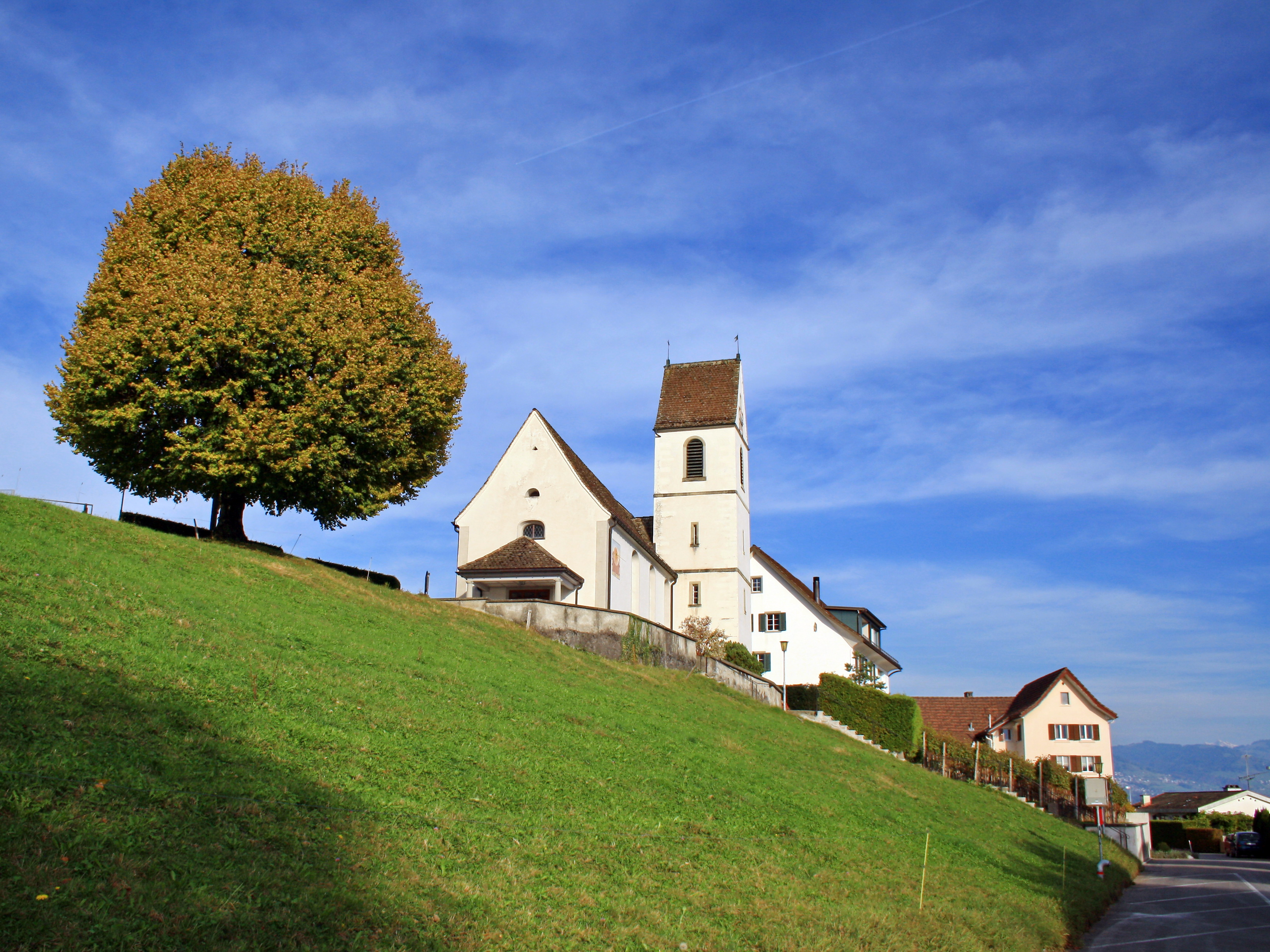
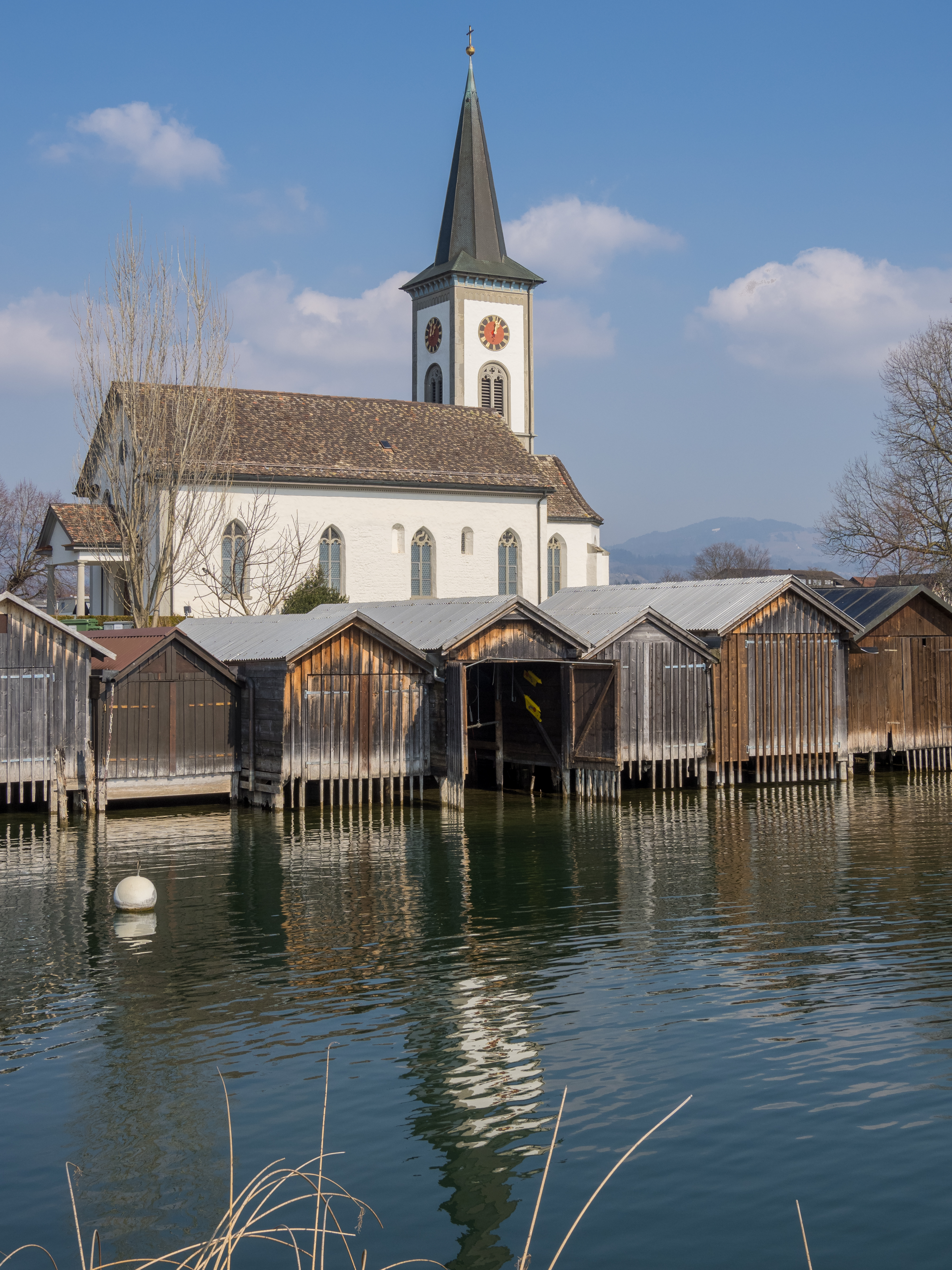
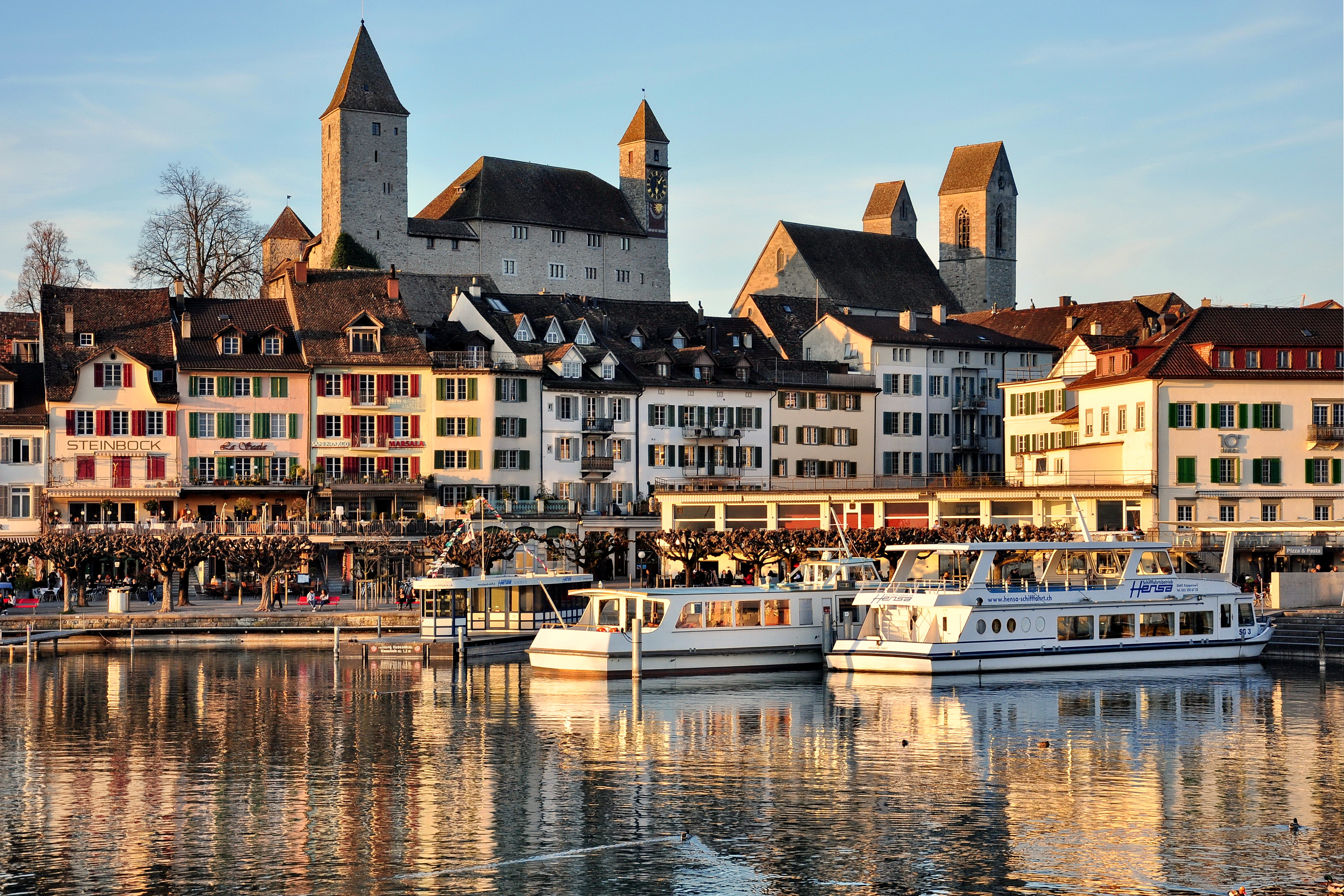
- Clockwise from top: View from Kempraten-Lenggis (Jona to the left, Rapperswil to the right), St. Pankraz in Bollingen; Rapperswil Castle, Stadtpfarrkirche, old town and port; St. Martin Busskirch and Obersee; Grünfels villa and public park

- Flag Coat of arms
- Location of Rapperswil-Jona
- Location within Switzerland Location within Canton of St. Gallen
- Coordinates: 47°13′N 8°49′E
- Country: Switzerland
- Canton: St. Gallen
- District: See-Gaster

Government
  - Executive: Stadtrat with 7 members
  - Mayor: Stadtpräsident (list); Barbara Dillier (as of January 2025)

Area
  - Total: 22.17 km^{2} (8.56 sq mi)
- Elevation: 409 m (1,342 ft)
- Highest elevation (Eggwald, Wagen): 544 m (1,785 ft)
- Lowest elevation (Busskirch): 407 m (1,335 ft)

Population (August 2019)
  - Total: 27,047
  - Density: 1,220/km^{2} (3,160/sq mi)
- Time zone: UTC+01:00 (CET)
  - Summer (DST): UTC+02:00 (CEST)
- Postal code: 8640
- SFOS number: 3340
- ISO 3166 code: CH-SG
- Localities: Rapperswil, Jona, Bollingen, Busskirch, Curtiberg, Kempraten-Lenggis, Wagen
- Surrounded by: Altendorf (SZ), Bubikon (ZH), Eschenbach, Freienbach (SZ), Hombrechtikon (ZH), Lachen (SZ), Rüti (ZH), Schmerikon, Tuggen (SZ), Wangen (SZ)
- Twin towns: Aalborg (Denmark), Bagno di Romagna (Italy)
- Website: rapperswil-jona.ch

Rapperswil-Jona is a municipality in the Wahlkreis (constituency) of See-Gaster in the canton of St. Gallen in Switzerland. Besides Rapperswil and Jona, which were separate municipalities until 2006, Rapperswil-Jona also includes Bollingen, Busskirch, Curtiberg, Kempraten-Lenggis, and Wagen.

== Today ==
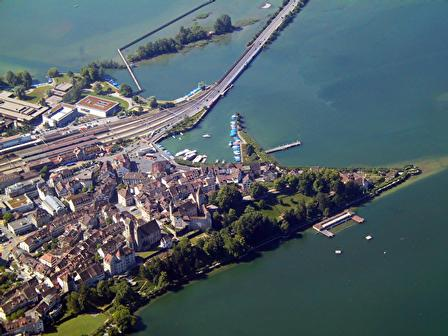
Rapperswil from the air

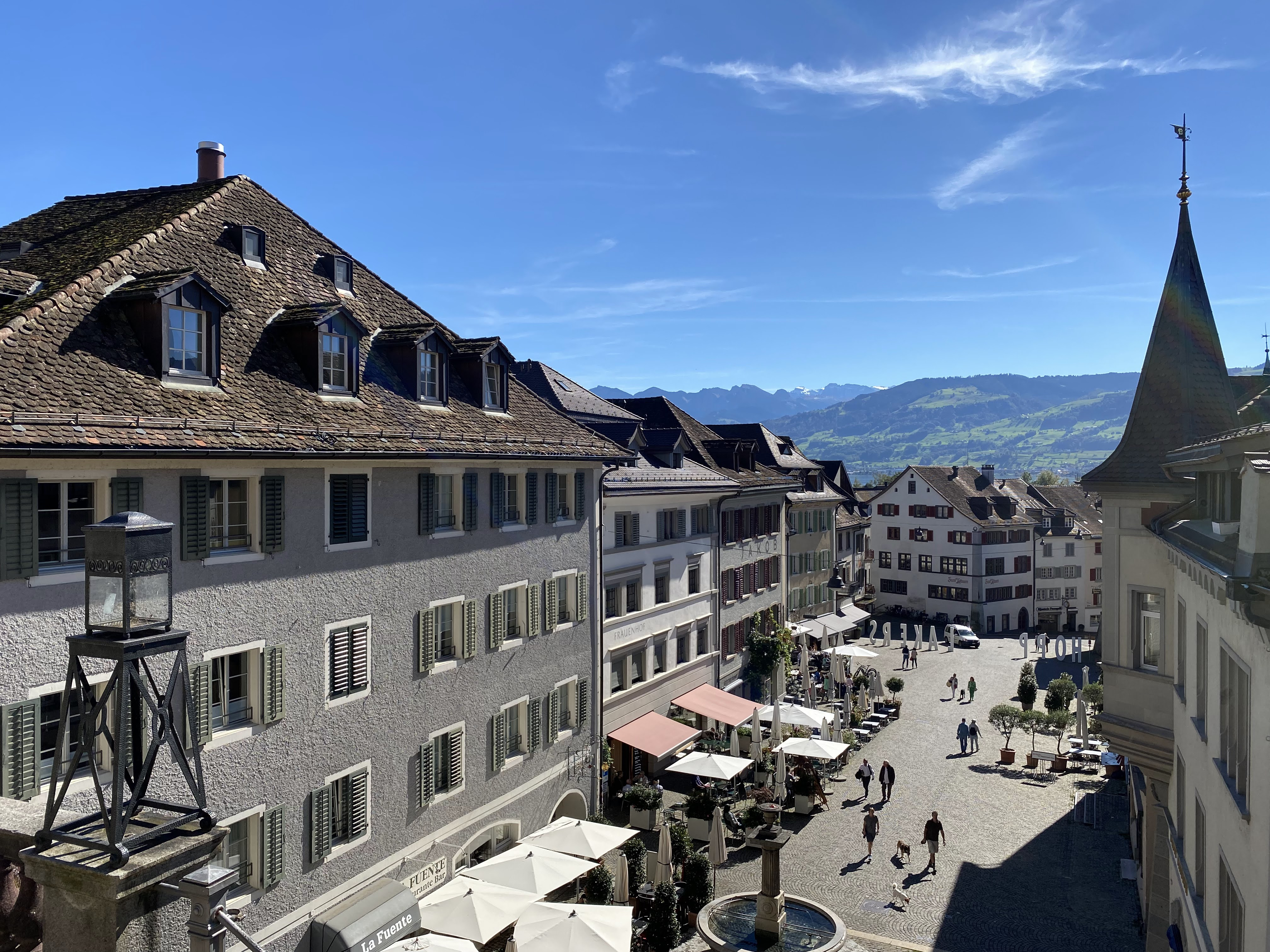
Rapperswil Hauptplatz (main square)

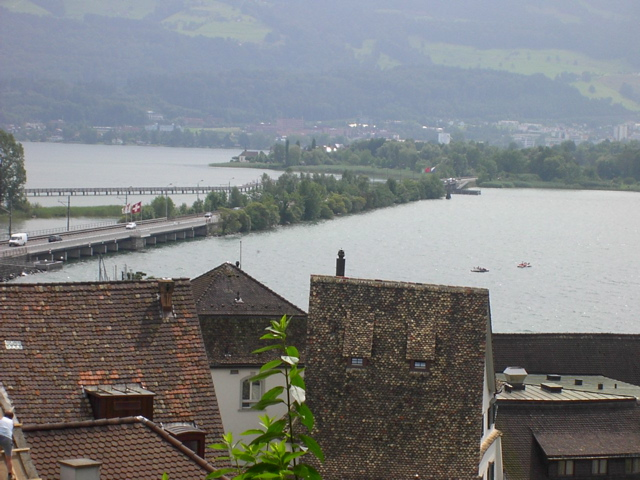
Seedamm isthmus (ice age moraine) with causeway and bridge, with both railway track and road. The wooden pedestrian bridge is shown in the background.

On 1 January 2007, the municipalities of Rapperswil and Jona merged to form a new political entity. After the merger Rapperswil-Jona had a population of 25,777 (17,799 from Jona and 7,601 from Rapperswil). This makes it the second largest town in the canton of St. Gallen after the capital St. Gallen itself. On 31 December 2020 the population was 27,483.

Rapperswil-Jona is one of the most significant traffic junctions in the region, and Rapperswil railway station is a nodal point for the Swiss Federal Railways, Südostbahn and Zurich S-Bahn lines. Zürichsee-Schifffahrtsgesellschaft (commonly abbreviated to ZSG) operates passenger vessels on the Lake Zurich, connecting surrounding towns between Zurich Bürkliplatz and Rapperswil. The Seedamm, a moraine of the Linth Glacier across Lake Zurich, links Rapperswil with Hurden (SZ) on the other side of the lake. This connection has been part of old pilgrimage routes. From early centuries, a wooden footbridge led across Lake Zurich. At a later stage, the bridge was replaced by a stone dam. In 2001, a new wooden footbridge was opened alongside the dam for the first 840 meters of the crossing. It was built in the same place as the original bridge and links Rapperswil with the nearby bridge chapel (Heilig Hüsli) built in 1551.

The main sights of Rapperswil are its roses, the castle, the reconstructed wooden bridge to Hurden with its bridge chapel, and a Capuchin monastery. There are also a number of churches, chapels, and the nearby Wurmsbach Abbey. In the surroundings of the town there are a number of churches. St. John's Church in Rapperswil was built around 1220 and became Rapperswil's parish church in 1253, the Chapel St. Ursula in the village of Kempraten was built around 885. The St. Dionysius Chapel, dedicated to Denis, the first bishop of Paris, was reconstructed in 1493 and attracts pilgrims. The nunnery (Wurmsbach Abbey), was established in 1259 and today houses an institute for girls, and St. Martin Busskirch is the former parish church of Rapperswil.

== History ==
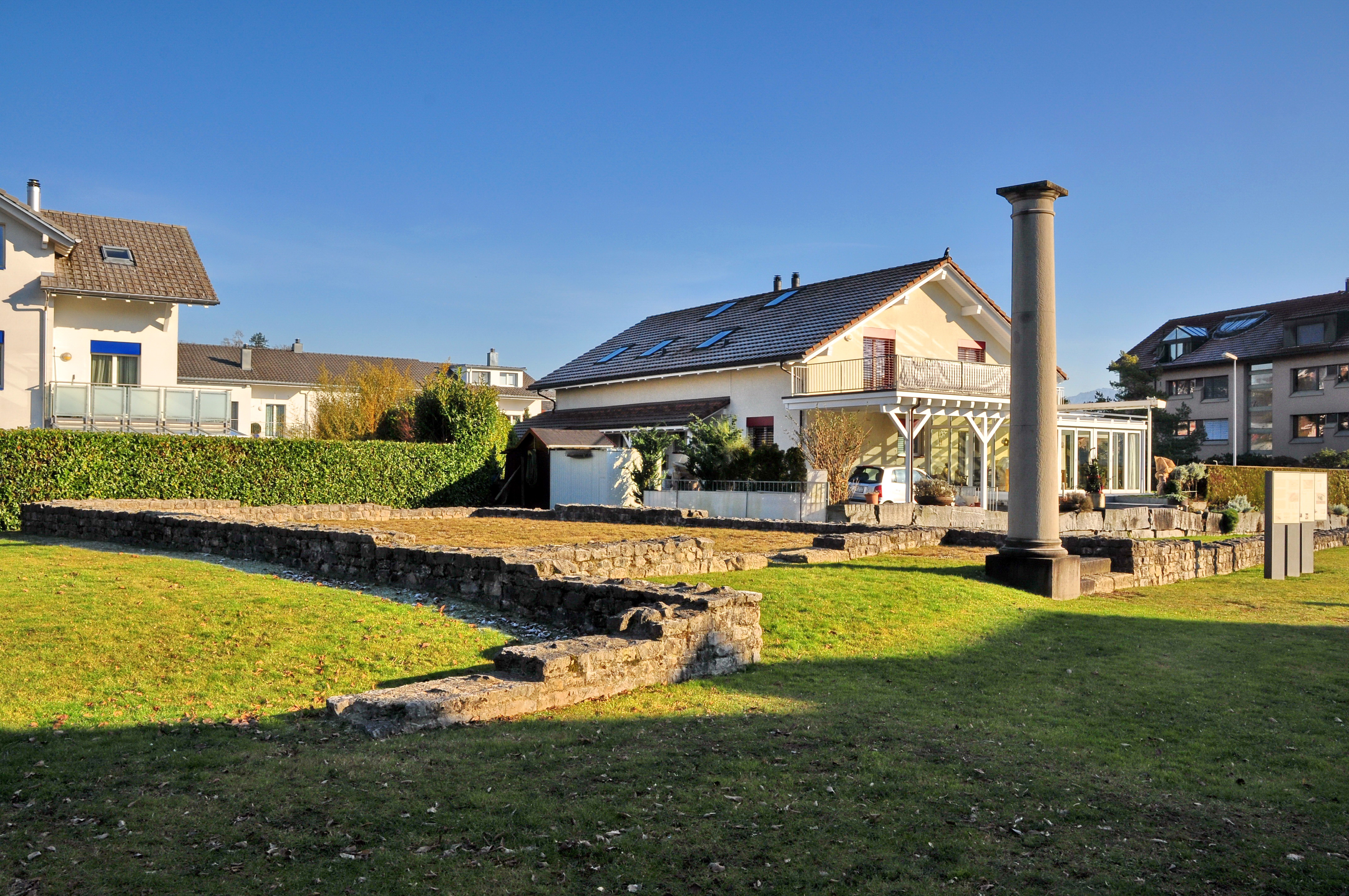
Centum Prata archeological site

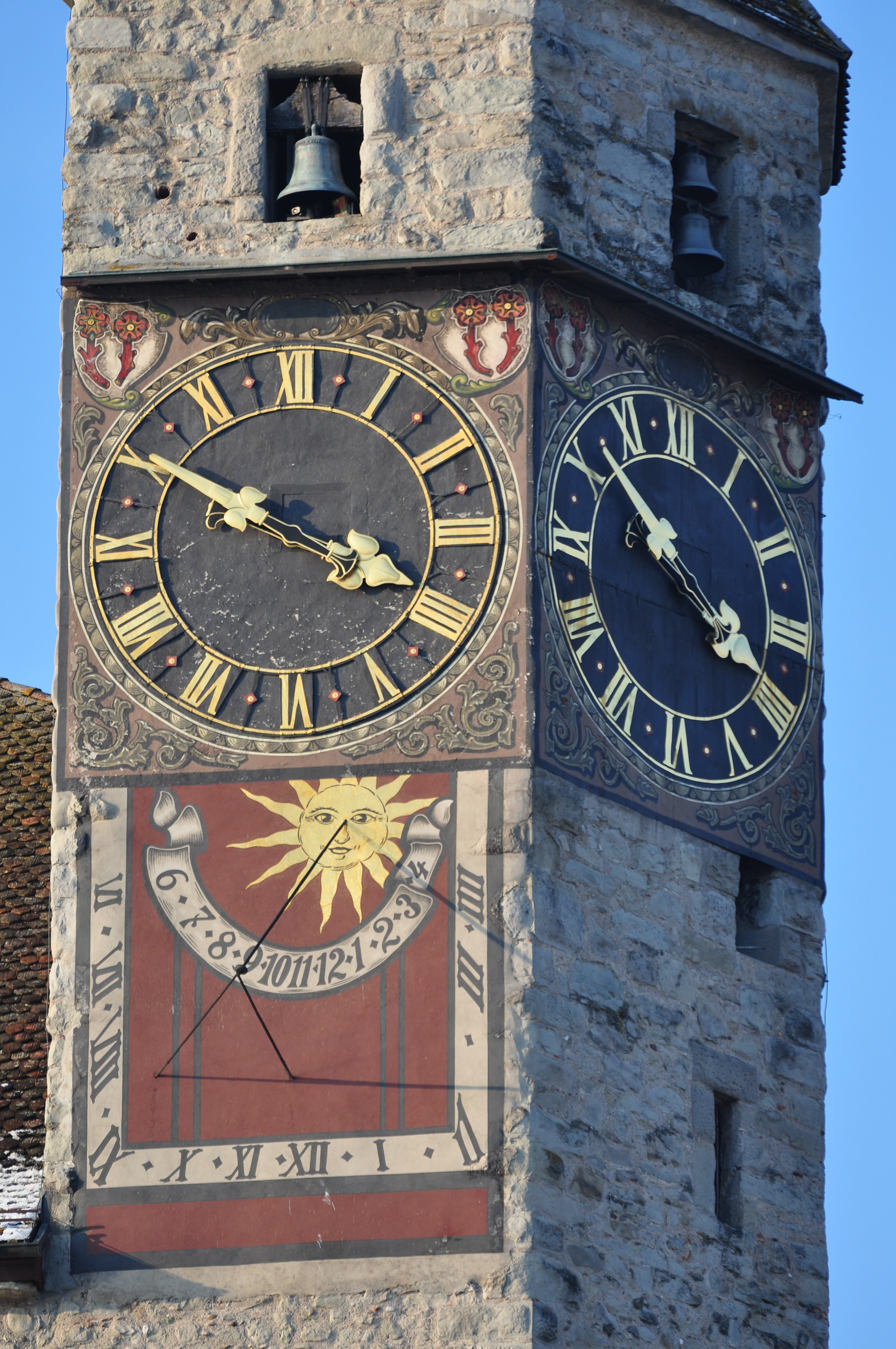
Rapperswil Castle Zeitturm (clock tower). View from Hauptplatz

Settlements in the area of Rapperswil-Jona date back at least 5000 years. Evidence includes archaeological relicts collected from the Neolithic Seegubel site or the body burials of the La Tène culture. Centum Prata, after which Kempraten is named, is an important archeological site of the Gallo-Roman era.

Atop the Lindenhof hill overlooking a former small village (Endingen), Rapperswil Castle was built around 1220 by the Counts of Rapperswil and is first mentioned in 1229. The town was founded when the nobility of Rapperswil moved from Altendorf across the lake to Rapperswil. The town was soon acquired by the Habsburg family who, in 1358/60, built the wooden bridge across the upper Lake Zurich. Later, the town bought itself free, and ending Old Zürich War made an alliance with the Swiss Confederation.

Because of its strategic location along important infrastructure the town grew rich because of flourishing trade. This allowed a certain degree of freedom which was ended with the formation of Swiss cantons by Napoleon. Rapperswil was at first part of the Helvetic canton of Linth. After 1803's Act of Mediation, it joined the canton of St. Gallen. The locational advantage of the place attracted the national Circus Knie who built its headquarters in Rapperswil in 1919. The circus is now also responsible for the Knie's Kinderzoo and the Circus Museum.

=== Cultural heritage ===
After the Seedamm causeway and bridge were built in 1878, the Heilig Hüsli chapel was the only remaining structure of the medieval wooden bridge. It stood isolated in the lake and was not accessible to visitors until the reconstruction of the former wooden bridge was erected in 2001. The reconstructed wooden bridge is listed as Swiss heritage sites of national significance as part of the Seedamm area including Heilig Hüsli and the remains of the prehistoric wooden bridges respectively stilt house settlements.

Located on the Seedamm isthmus, an ice age moraine (Linth Glacier) between the Obersee and the main body of Lake Zurich, the area is in close vicinity to the prehistoric lake crossings that are documented by finds in the Hurden Rosshorn site. Three pile dwelling settlements were closely connected to these sea crossings: Freienbach–Hurden Seefeld, Rapperswil-Jona/Hombrechtikon–Feldbach and Rapperswil-Jona–Technikum. Because the lake has grown in size over time, the original piles are now around 4 metres (13 ft) to 7 metres (23 ft) under the water level of 406 metres (1,332 ft).

As well as being part of the 56 Swiss sites of the UNESCO World Heritage Site Prehistoric pile dwellings around the Alps, the settlements are also listed in the Swiss inventory of cultural property of national and regional significance as a Class object.

There are further sites that are listed as in the Swiss inventory of cultural property of national and regional significance as Class A object: The chapel of St. Dionys, Schloss Rapperswil with the Polish Museum and its archive and the Rathaus (Town Council house) of Rapperswil are the more recent structures. The Roman Vicus Centum Prata at Kempraten and the Seedamm region and historical bridge (which had existed in some form since the prehistoric era through the Middle Ages with the most recent bridge in 2001 and Heilig Hüsli) round out the five.

== Geography ==
Rapperswil-Jona has an area, as of 2006, of 22.2 square kilometers (8.6 sq mi). Of this area, 37.4% is used for agricultural purposes, while 30.6% is forested. Of the rest of the land, 28.6% is settled (buildings or roads) and the remainder (3.4%) is non-productive (rivers or lakes).

Rapperswil-Jona is situated across the Seedamm, an ice age moraine built by the Linth Glacier, which separates Lake Zurich into an upper and lower part. The Linth Glacier, named after the River Linth, also formed Lake Zurich itself (glacial lake) and shaped the surrounding land. It was connected to the Rhine Glacier. The River Jona, which originates near Gibswil in the canton of Zurich, runs through Rapperswil-Jona and flows into Obersee.

== Demographics ==
Most of the population (as of 2000) speaks German (86.9%), with Italian being second most common ( 3.1%) and Serbo-Croatian being third (2.1%).

In the 2007 federal election the most popular party was the SVP which received 30.3% of the vote. The next three most popular parties were the CVP (19.3%), the SP (17%) and the FDP (13.1%).

In Rapperswil-Jona about 74.6% of the population (between age 25–64) have completed either non-mandatory upper secondary education or additional higher education (either university or a Fachhochschule).

There are also a few immigrant communities many of whom of Sri Lankan origin as well as Albanian, Turkish and Bosnian being the largest groups.

== Economy ==
As of 2007, Rapperswil-Jona had an unemployment rate of 1.84%. As of 2005, there were 183 people employed in the primary economic sector and about 56 businesses involved in this sector. 3,898 people are employed in the secondary sector and there are 231 businesses in this sector. 8,340 people are employed in the tertiary sector, with 1,077 businesses in this sector.

Among other companies, Geberit, LafargeHolcim, Obersee Nachrichten and Radio Zürisee are situated in Rapperswil-Jona.

== Transport ==
=== Train ===
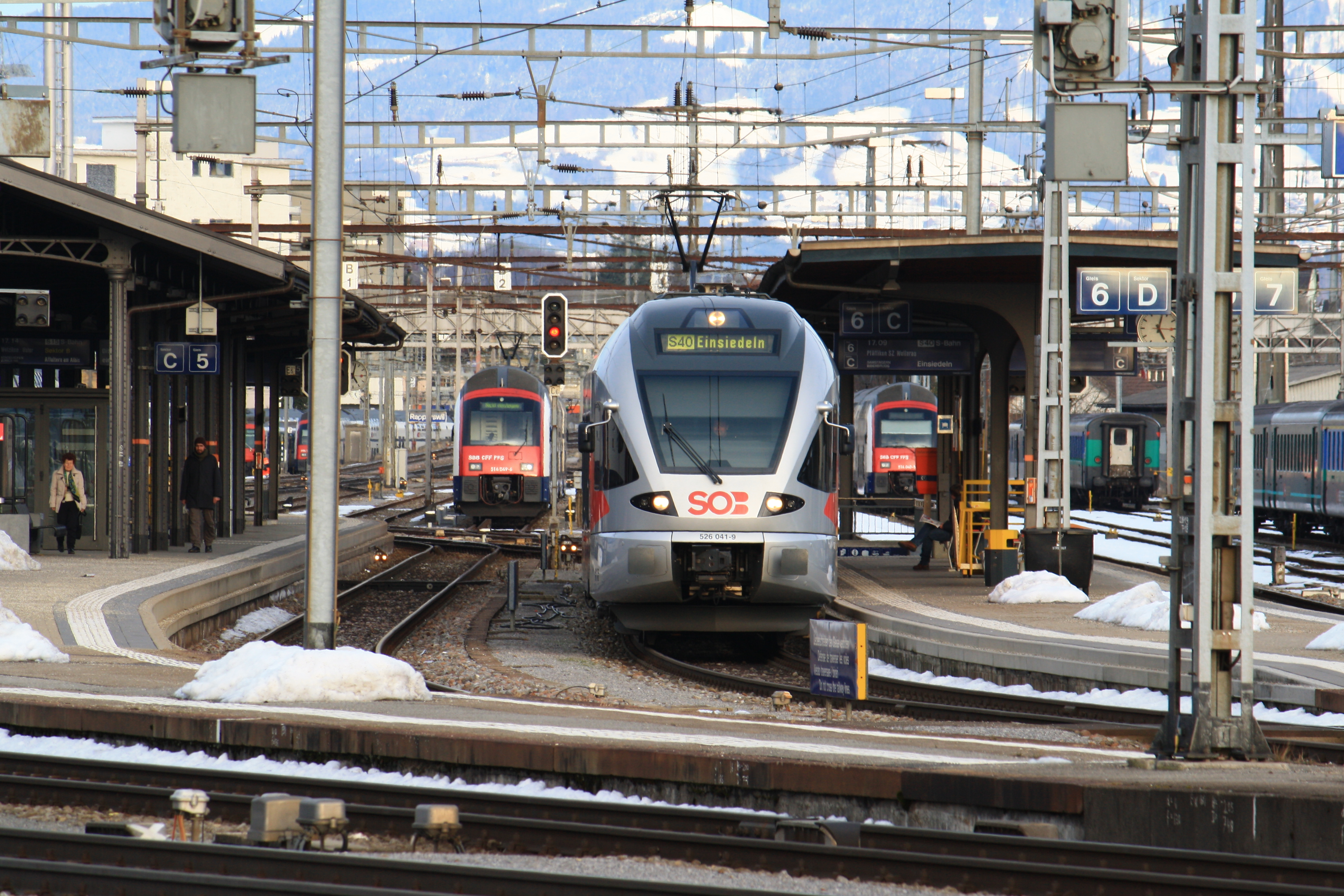
Trains at Rapperswil railway station

The municipality of Rapperswil-Jona is served by four railway stations, of which the main one is Rapperswil. This railway station is served by S-Bahn lines S5, S7, S15 and S40 of the Zurich S-Bahn, the first three of which provide frequent (6 trains per hour) and fast (36 minute journey time) links to the city of Zurich. It is also a calling point of the Voralpen-Express, an InterRegio (IR) running hourly between Lucerne and St. Gallen. The S5, S40 and the Voralpen-Express use the Seedamm causeway (Rapperswil-Pfäffikon railway). Rapperswil railway station is also the terminus of three hourly regional trains of St. Gallen S-Bahn: the S4 which operates eastwards to Sargans via St. Gallen, the S6 which operates south-east to Schwanden/Linthal via Ziegelbrücke, and the S17 which operates eastwards to Sargans via Ziegelbrücke.

The other three railway stations are Jona, served by lines S5 and S15 of the Zurich S-Bahn (combined quarter-hourly service), Kempraten, served half-hourly by line S7 of the Zurich S-Bahn, and Blumenau, served half-hourly by lines S6 and S17 of St. Gallen S-Bahn. The fifth station, Bollingen, is now disused.

The S5 and S15 of ZVV are operated by Swiss Federal Railways, whereas the S4, S6 and S17 (Tarifverbund Ostwind), S40 (Tarifverbund Schwyz), and the IR Voralpen-Express are operated by Südostbahn (SOB).

==== History ====
Prior to the 10 December 2023 timetable change, service over the Rapperswil-Ziegelbrücke railway line east of Rapperswil-Jona was provided by the S6 and InterRegio Voralpen-Express, which combined for a half-hourly service to Uznach. While the S6 called at all stations, the Voralpen-Express did not serve Blumenau. With the upgrade from single track to double-track between Uznach and Schmerikon (constructed between 2021 and 2023), Rapperswil received two additional S-Bahn services. The S4, which followed a circle route between 2013 and 2023, was rerouted to run between Sargans and Rapperswil via St. Gallen. This line does not call at stations between Uznach and Rapperswil. Additionally, a new line, the S17, began operations between Sargans and Rapperswil via Ziegelbrücke (calling at all stations between Uznach and Rapperswil). The scheduled call at Schmerikon of the Voralpen-Express was suspended in December 2023.

=== Bus ===
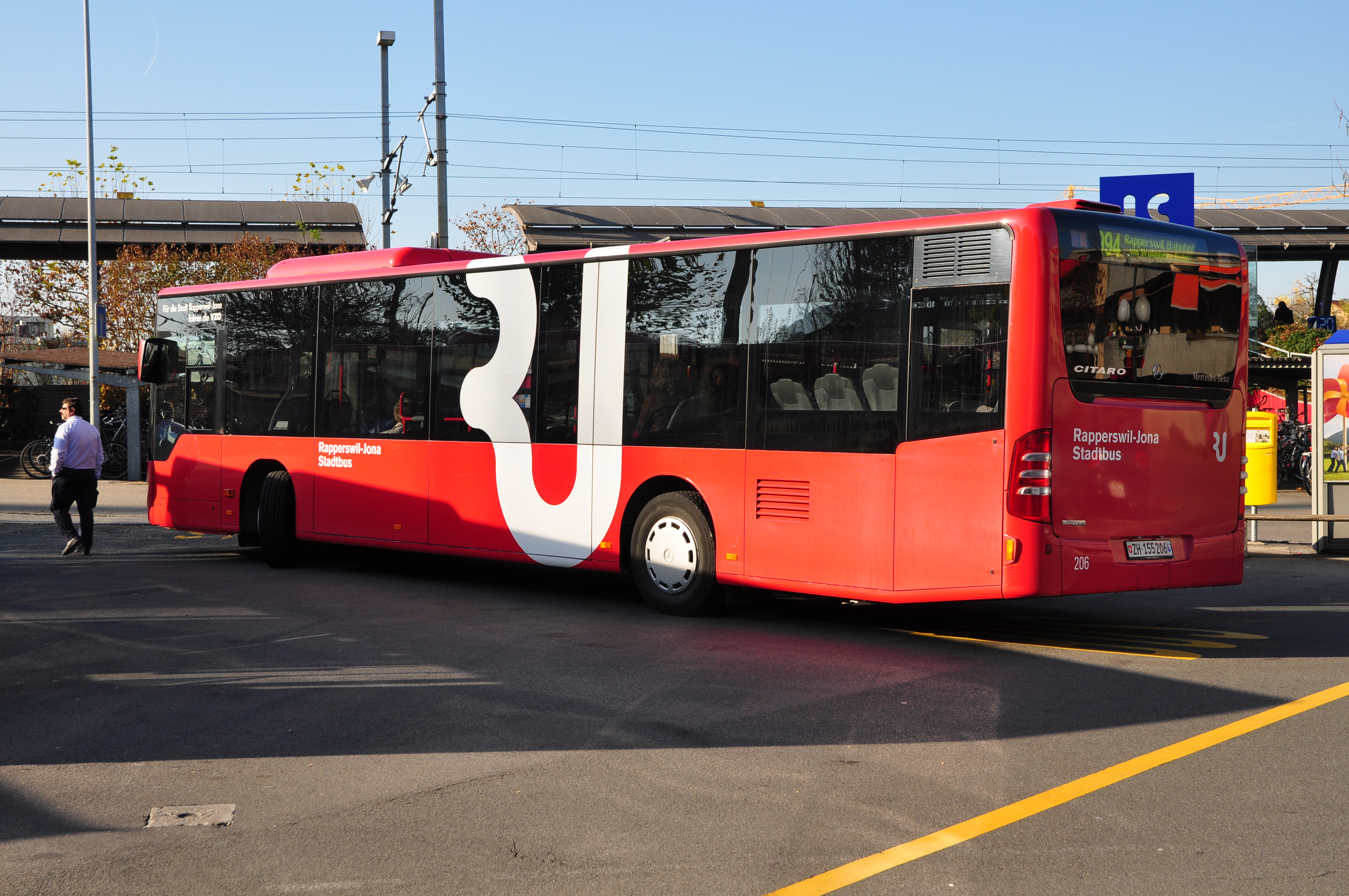
Bus of Stadtbus Rapperswil-Jona at Jona bus station (before it was renewed between 2013 and 2015)

The municipality is served by a local bus service, Stadtbus Rapperswil-Jona, provided since 2008 by the Verkehrsbetriebe Zürichsee und Oberland (VZO). In addition, Schneider Busbetriebe operates line 622 to Wagen (continues to St. Gallenkappel/Wattwil) and, since December 2023, bus line 995 from Jona to Hummelberg and Buechstrasse Ost. As of the December 2023 timetable change, the bus services are as follows:

Line	Route	Operator
622	Rapperswil Bahnhof – Cityplatz – Sonnenhof – Kreuz (Jona railway station) – Jona Center – St. Dyonis – Wagen – Eschenbach – St. Gallenkappel (– Ricken – Wattwil)	Schneider
885	Rapperswil Bahnhof – Cityplatz – Sonnenhof – Kempraten, Bahnhof – Schönau – Rüti ZH, Bahnhof – Wald ZH, Bahnhof – Goldingen – Atzmännig, Schutt	(VZO)
991	Rapperswil Bahnhof Süd – Kinderzoo – Grünfeld – Geberit (Blumenau railway station) – Jona, Bahnhof	Stadtbus Rapperswil-Jona (VZO)
992	Sonnenhof – Glärnischstrasse – Grünfeld – Geberit (Blumenau railway station) – Feldlistrasse – Jona, Bahnhof	Stadtbus Rapperswil-Jona (VZO)
993	Rapperswil Bahnhof – Cityplatz – Sonnenhof – Altersheim Meienberg – Vogelau (Jona railway station) – Tägernau	Stadtbus Rapperswil-Jona (VZO)
994	Rapperswil Bahnhof – Cityplatz – Sonnenhof – Kempraten, Bahnhof – Wohnheim Balm – Schönau – Jona, Bahnhof	Stadtbus Rapperswil-Jona (VZO)
995	Jona, Bahnhof – Jona Center – Hummelberg/Jona, Buechstrasse Ost	Schneider
996	Rapperswil Bahnhof Süd – Kinderzoo – Grünfeld – Geberit (Blumenau railway station) – Schachen/Feldlistrasse – Jona, Bahnhof	Stadtbus Rapperswil-Jona (VZO)

==== History ====
Until the timetable change on 10 December 2023, bus line 621 (operated by Schneider) ran between Rapperswil railway station and Jona, Buechstrasse Ost. This line stopped operations due to the increase in frequency of line 622, which mostly uses the same route. Line 995 operated between Rapperswil railway station and Hummelberg, but its leg between Kreuz (Jona railway station) and Rapperswil railway station was truncated in December 2023 for the same reason. Line 995 now also serves the leg from Jona Center to Jona, Buechstrasse Ost, formerly operated by line 621.

=== Boat ===
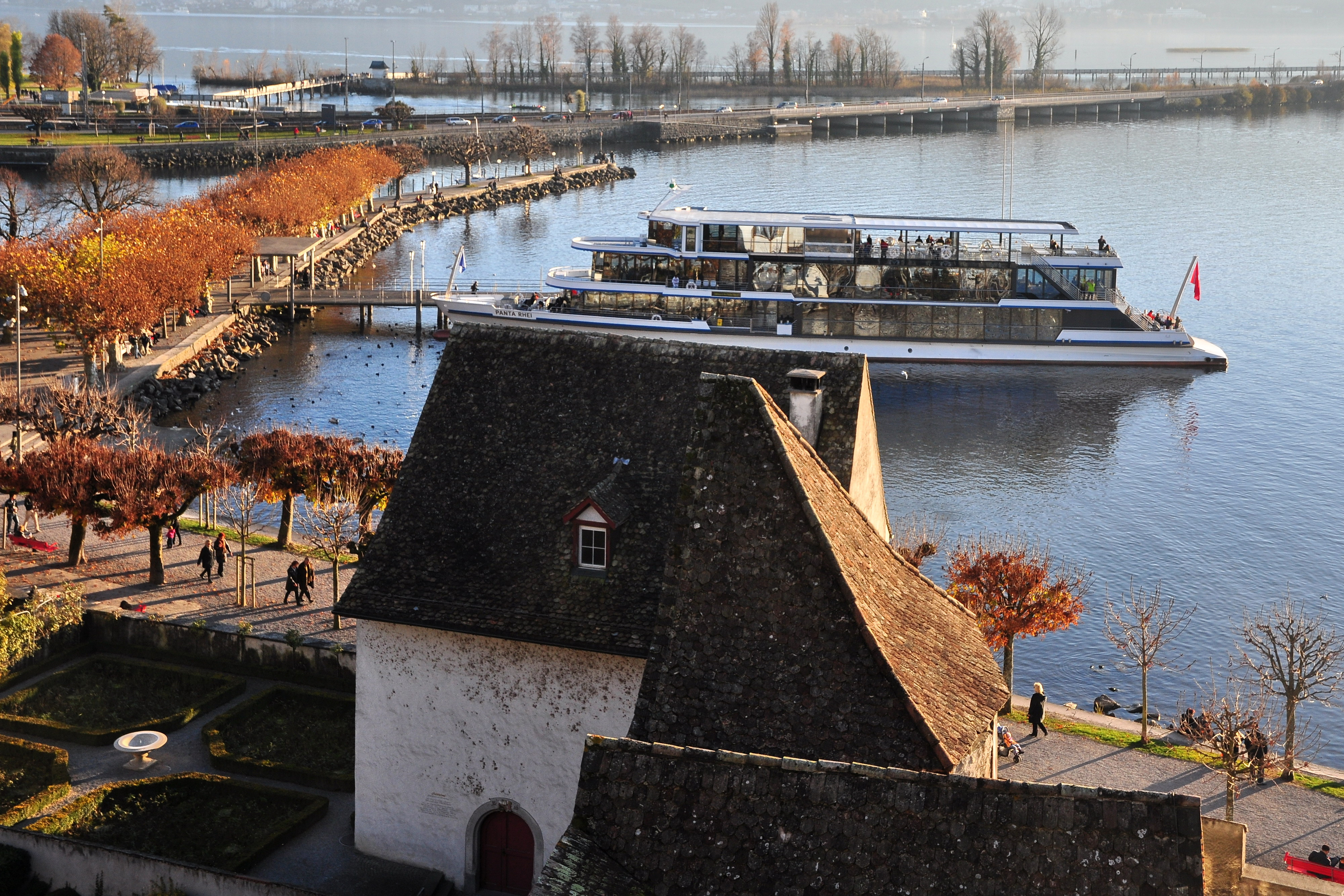
Boat of ZSG in Rapperswil harbour

Rapperswil harbour is adjacent to the old town of Rapperswil and Rapperswil railway station. Lake shipping services of the Zürichsee-Schifffahrtsgesellschaft (ZSG) provide routes to Zurich and other lakeside towns on Lake Zurich. Most boats of ZSG dock Ufenau island near Rapperswil harbour.

During summer, there is a ferry across Obersee. The ferry connects a pier near the University of Applied Sciences Rapperswil (now part of OST), just south of Rapperswil railway station, with Lachen and Altendorf in the canton of Schwyz.

=== Private transport ===
As of 2016, an average of 26,000 road vehicles cross the Seedamm causeway and the Bahnhofstrasse in Rapperswil every day. Rapperswil-Jona is expected to participate as the first Swiss city in a pilot project for so-called Mobility pricing in order to relieve the traffic on road and rail during rush hours.

=== Air transport ===
The nearest airport is Zurich Airport, which is located 41 km (25 mi) north west of Rapperswil-Jona. It is easily accessible by train operated by Schweizerische Bundesbahnen.

== Sport ==
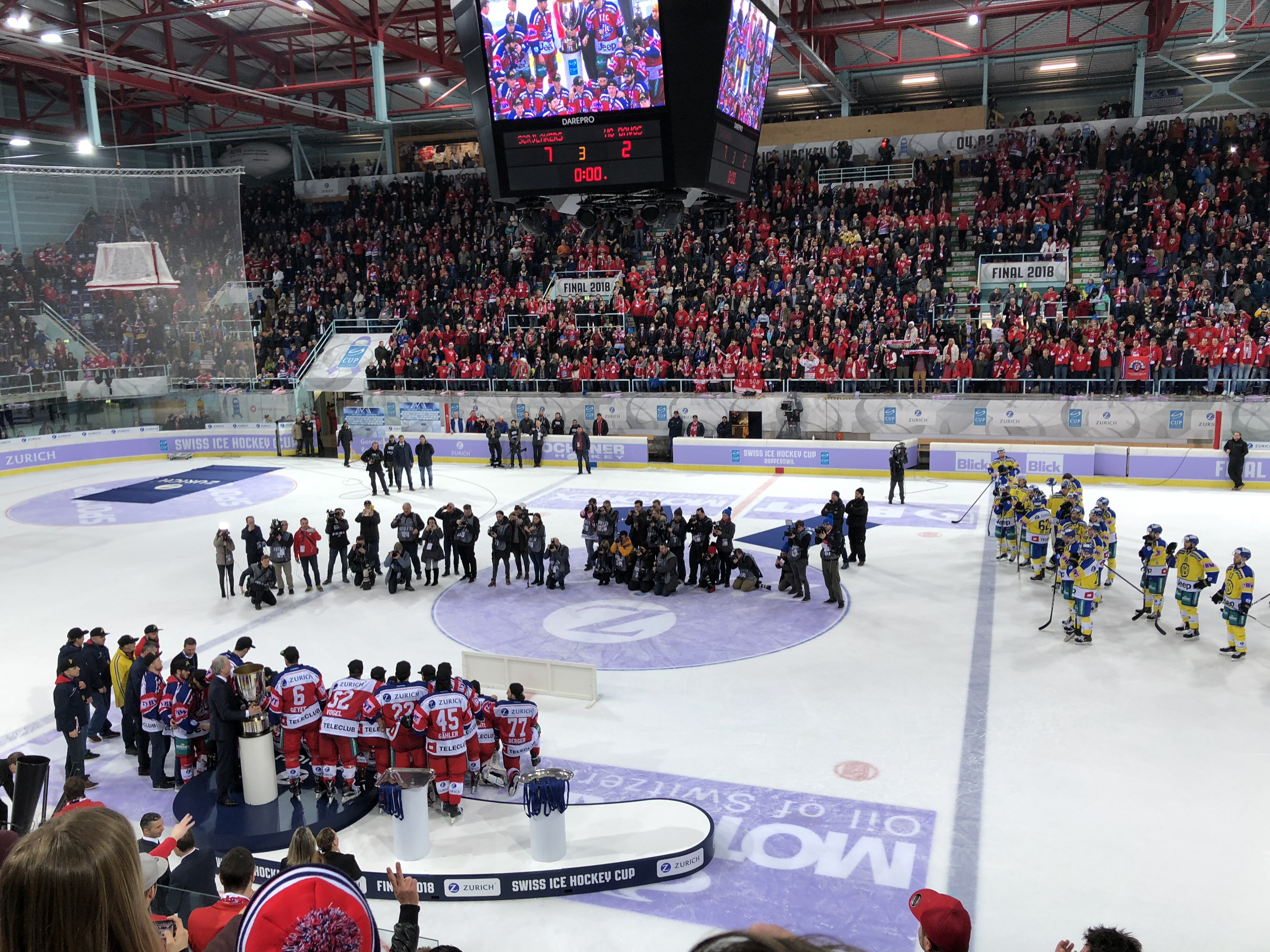
SC Rapperswil-Jona Lakers won the cup final in 2018 in the St. Galler Kantonalbank Arena

The National League ice hockey team Rapperswil-Jona Lakers plays in the 6,200-seat St. Galler Kantonalbank Arena.

The FC Rapperswil-Jona is a football team. It was founded in 1928 and is now playing in the Swiss Challenge League

In 2003, Rapperswill-Jona hosted the World Orienteering Championships.

== International relations ==
Rapperswil-Jona is twinned with:

Aalborg, Denmark	Bagno di Romagna, Emilia-Romagna, Italy

== Notable people ==
and

== Gallery and map ==
Rapperswil-Jona

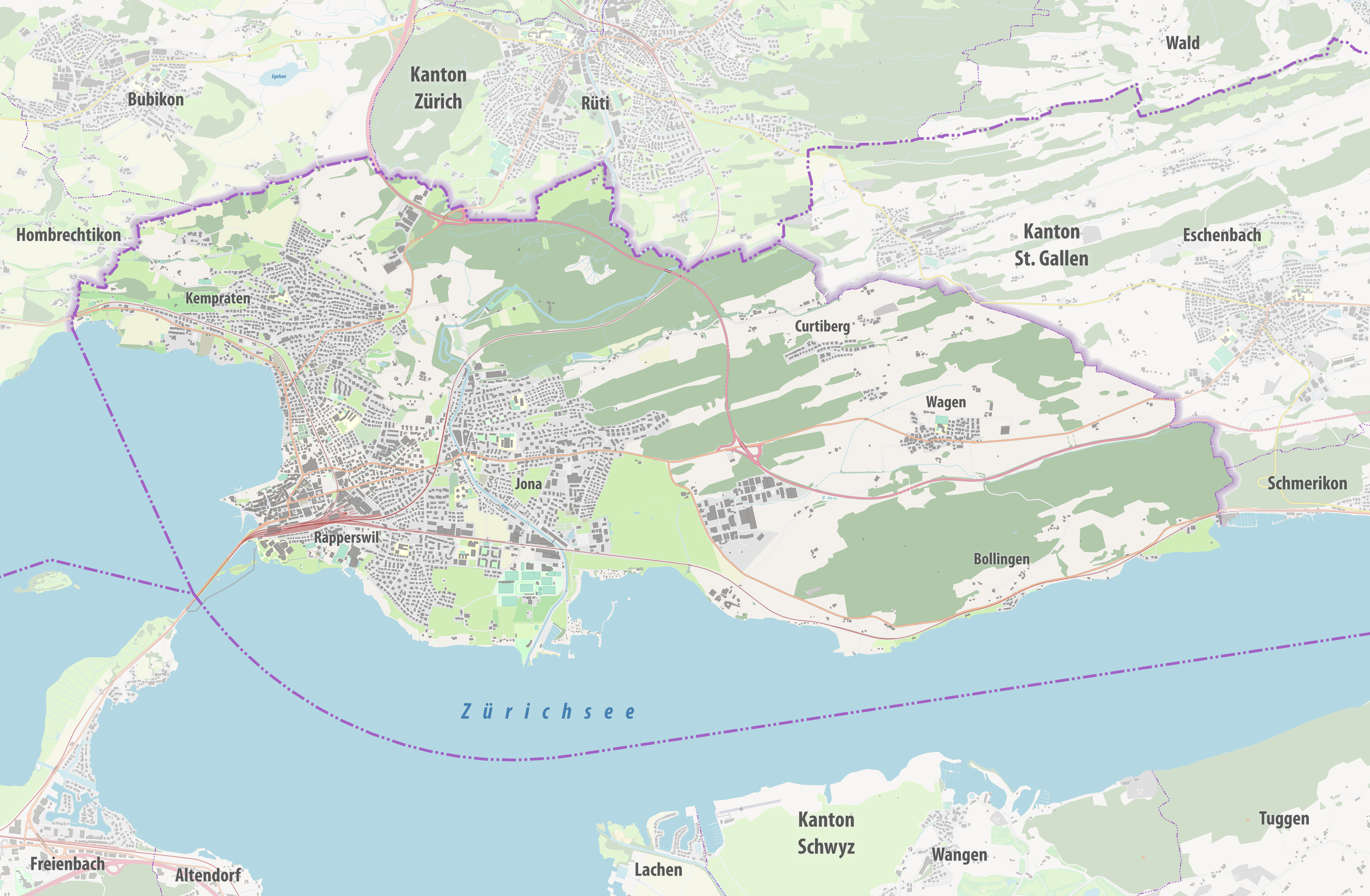
Map of Rapperswil-Jona municipality (2021)

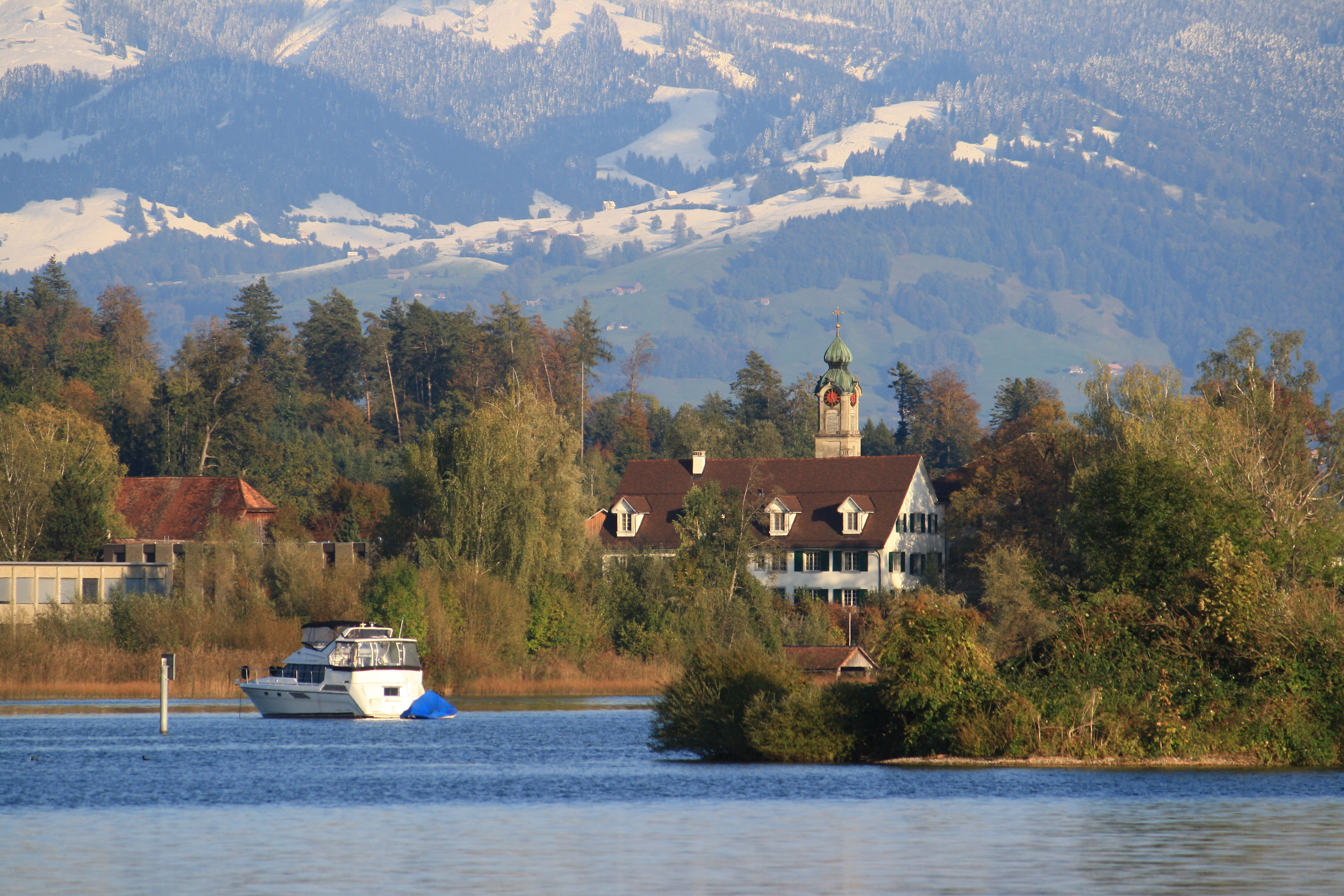
Wurmsbach Abbey

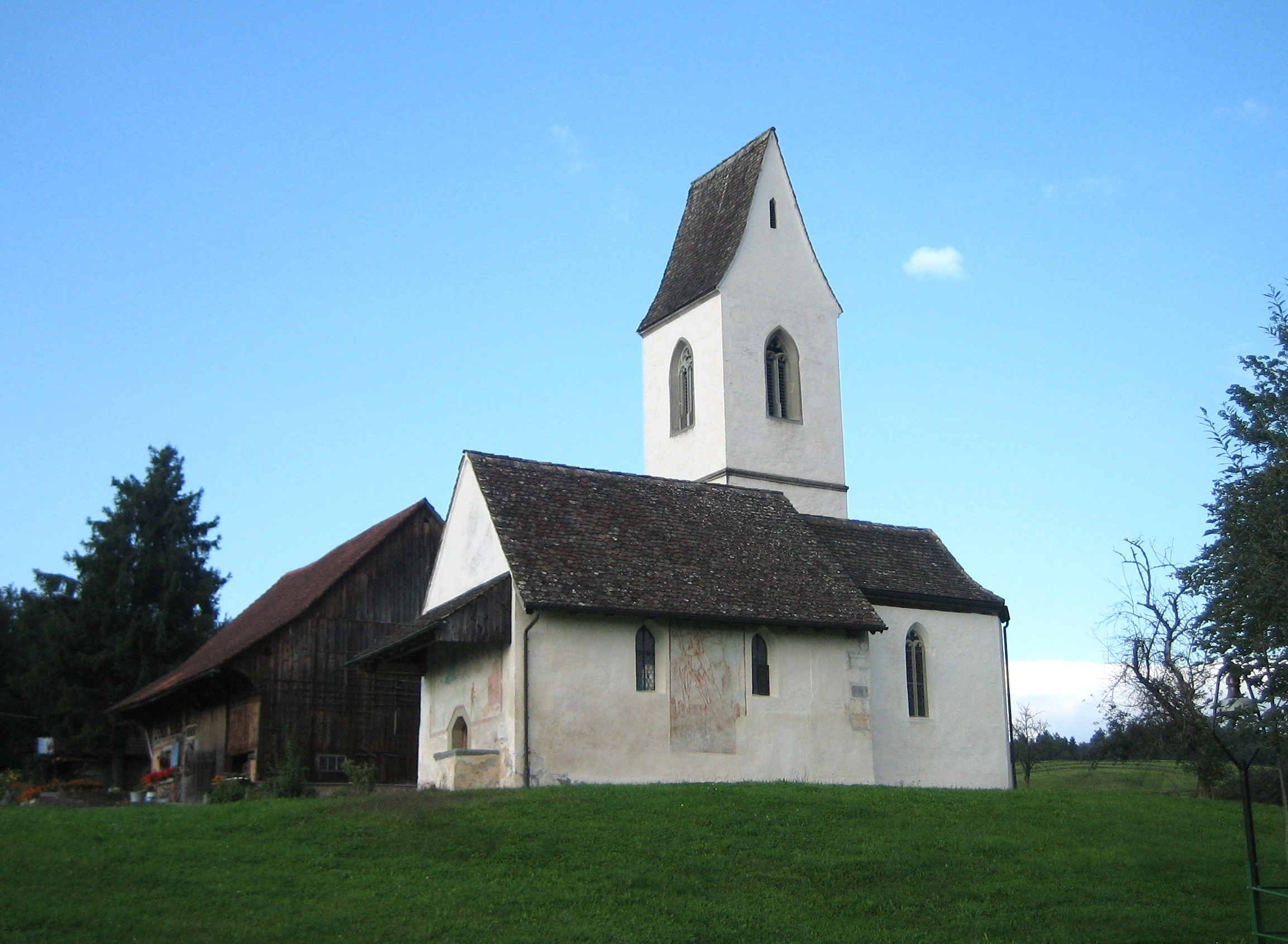
Chapel of St. Dionys

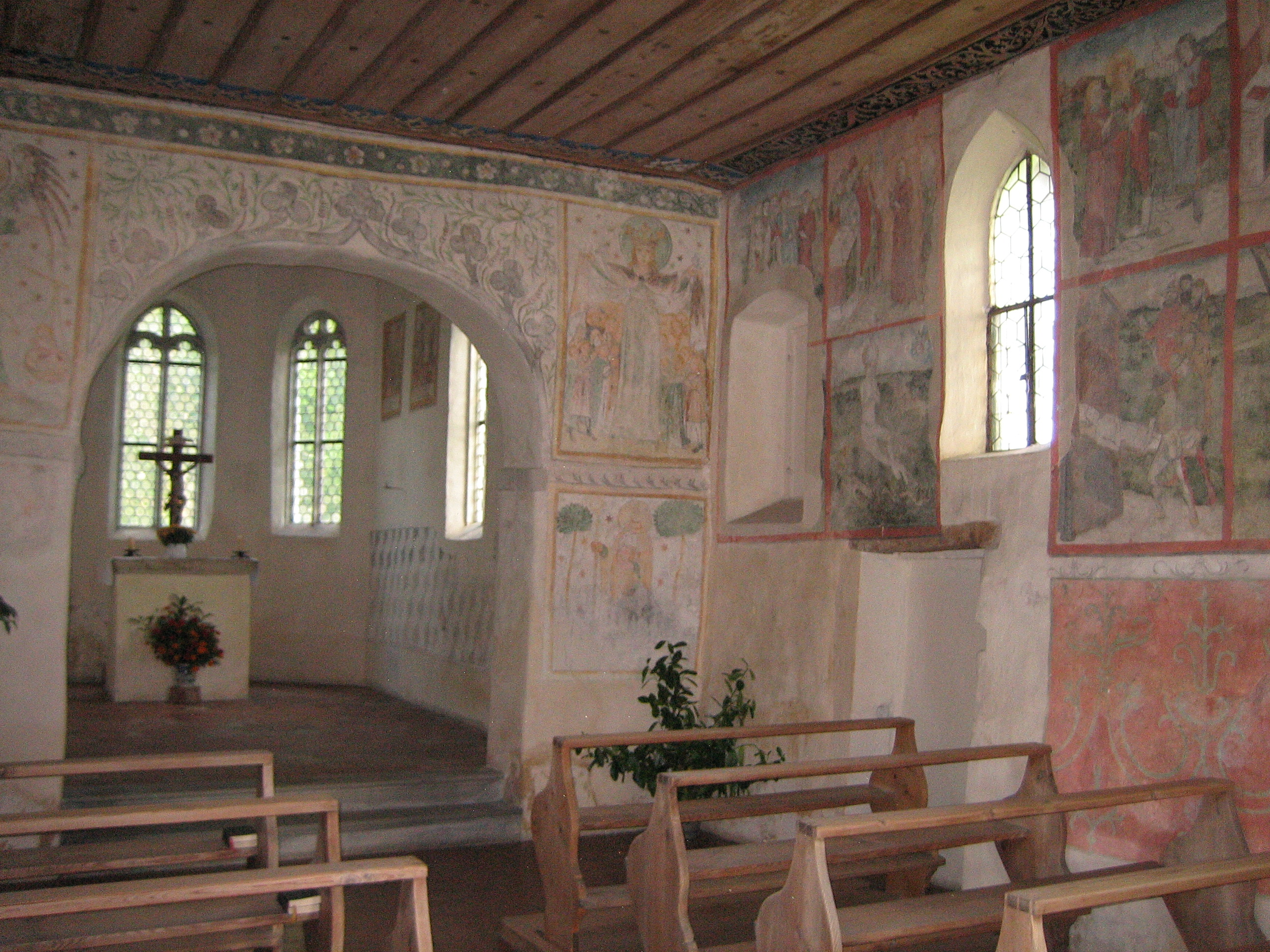
Interior of the chapel

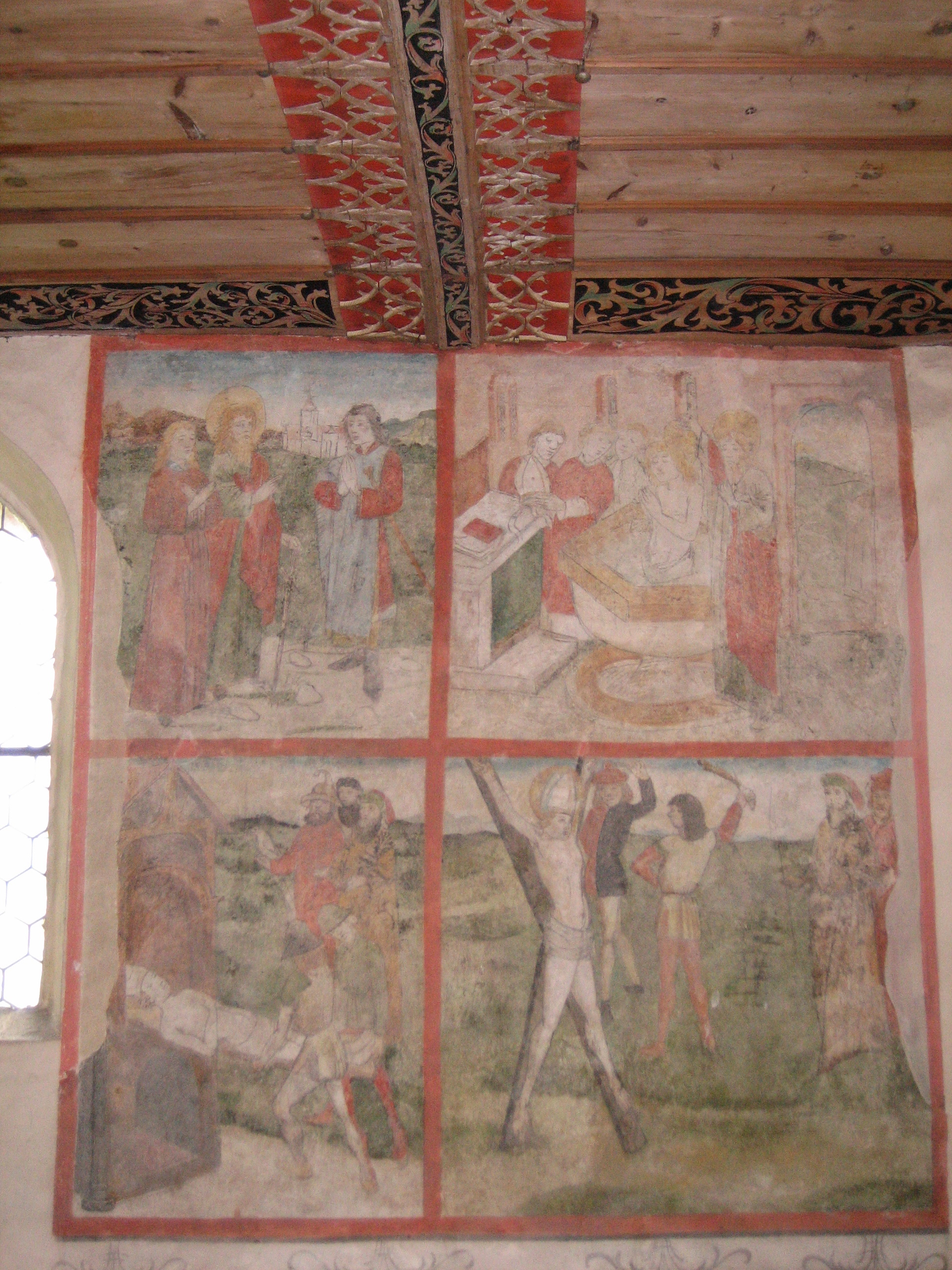
Paintings on the south wall of the chapel

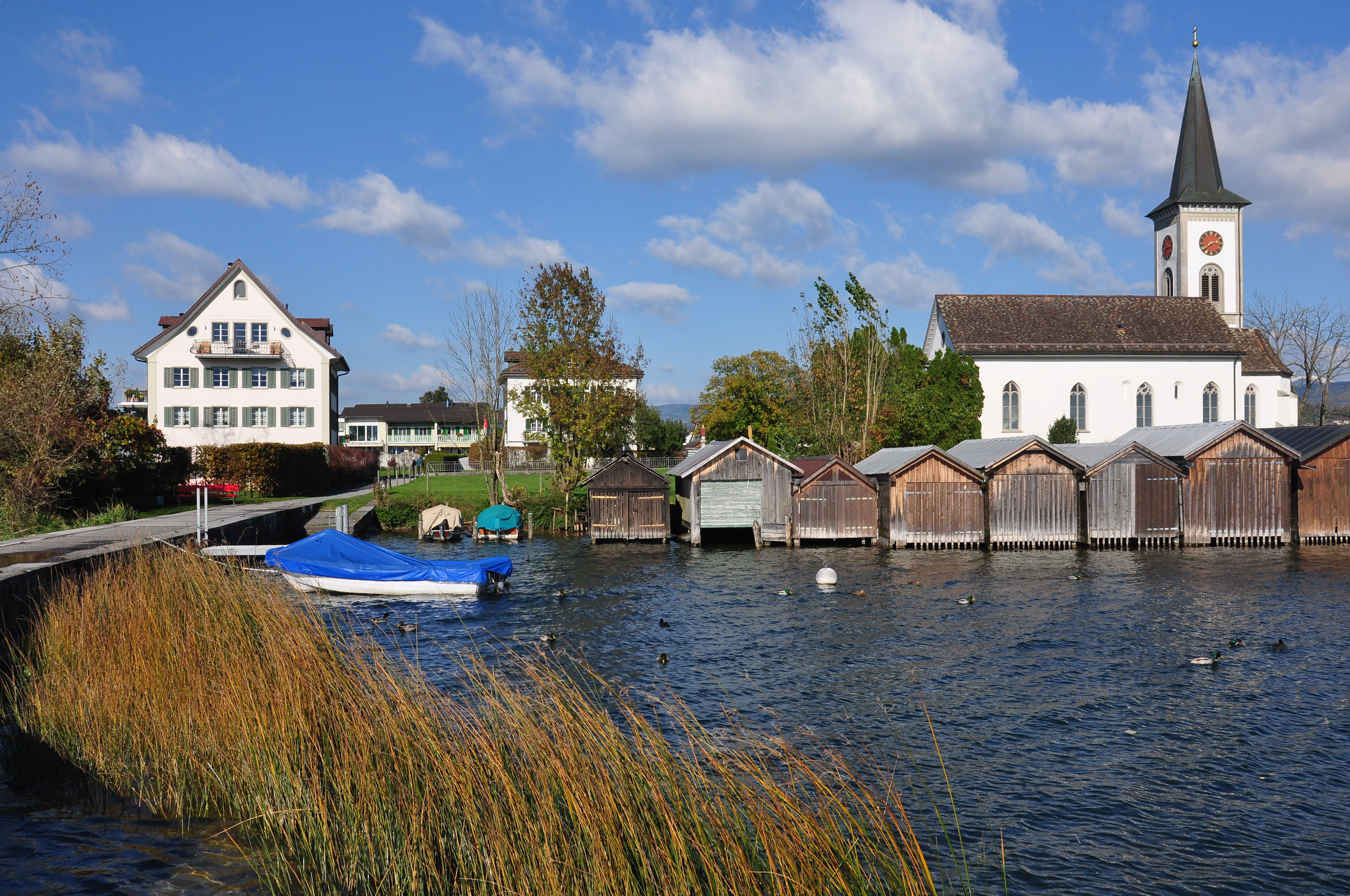
St. Martin Busskirch on Obersee (upper Lake Zurich)

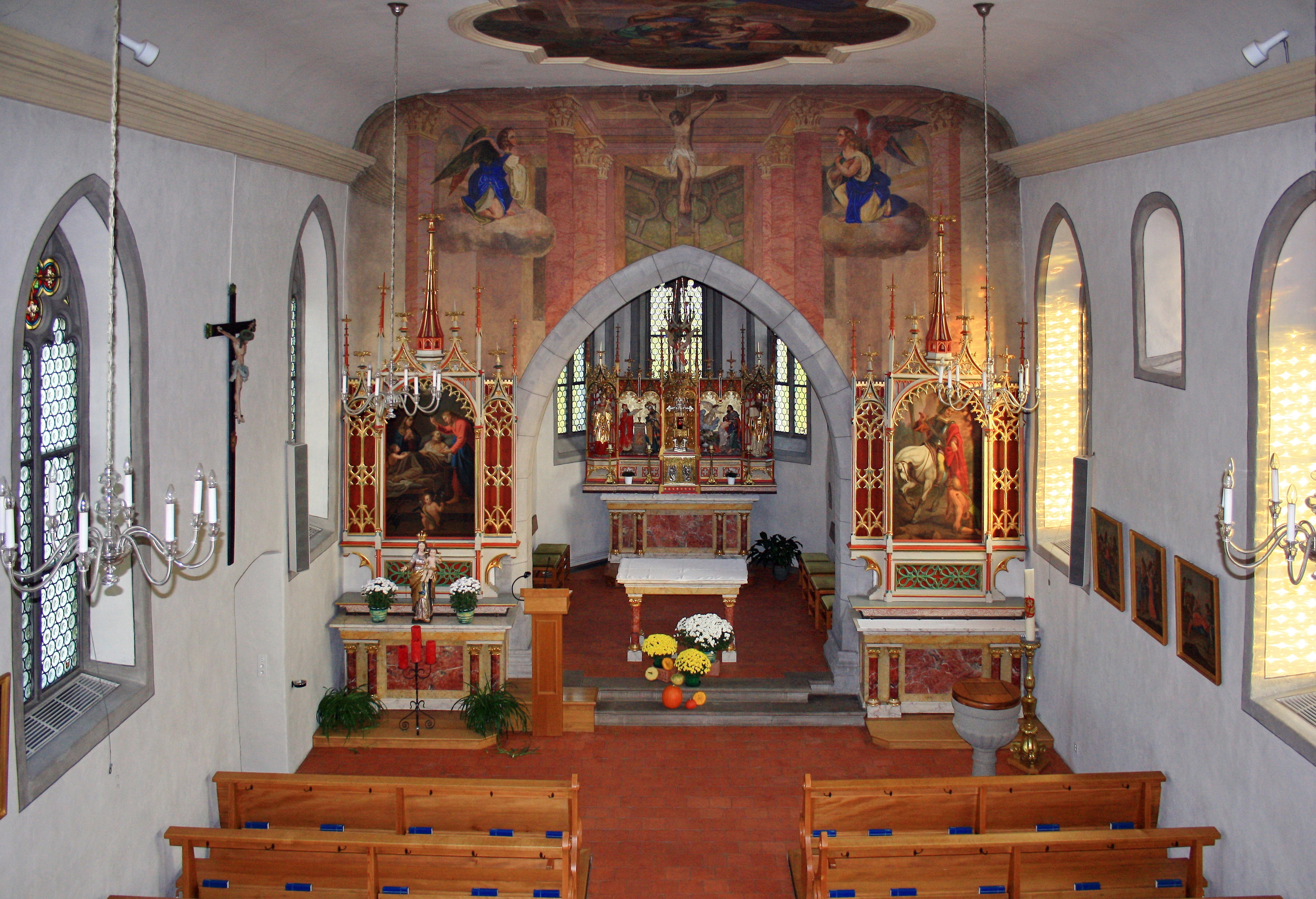
inside the medieval Parish church

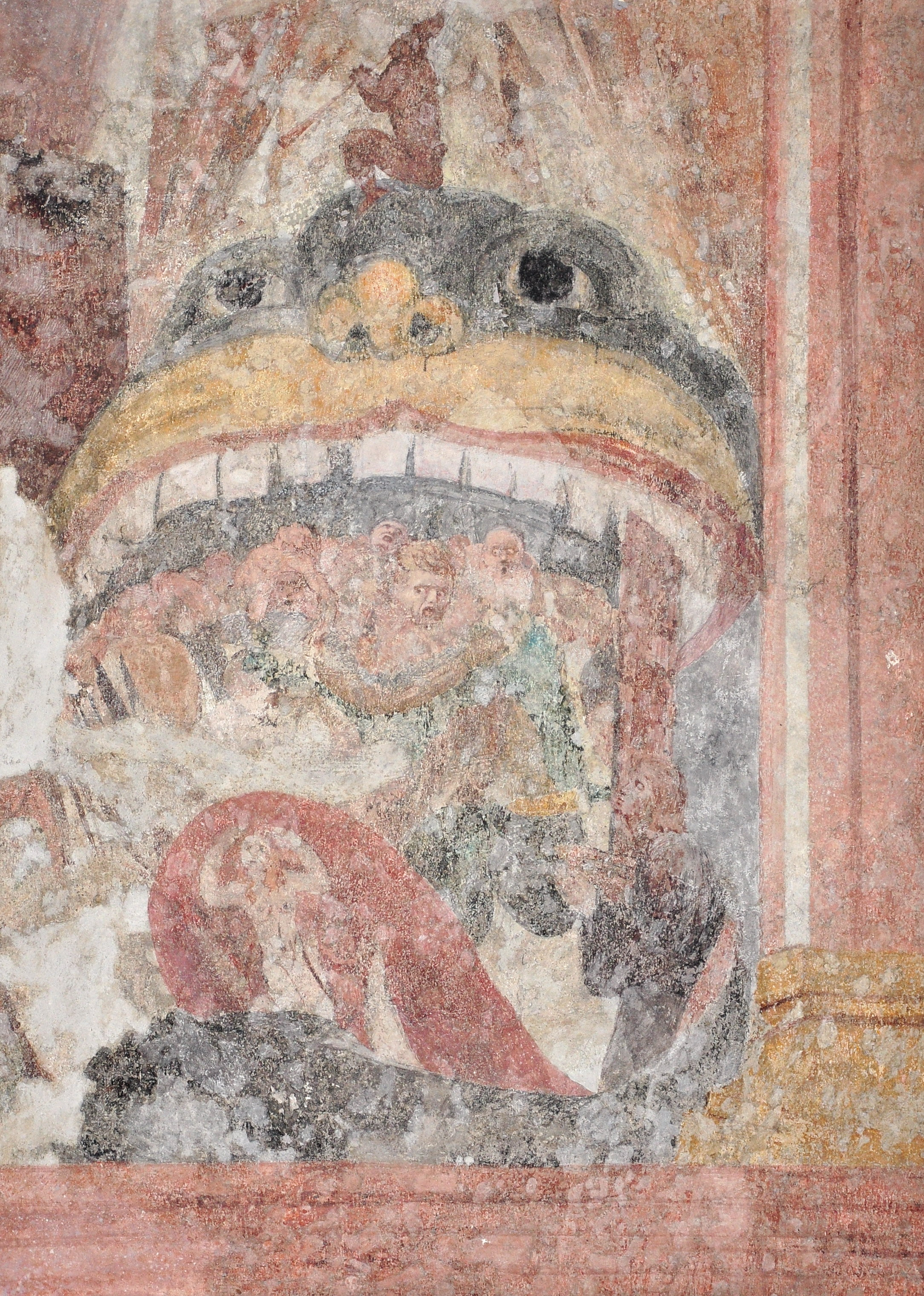
Höllenrachen (Last Judgement) painting inside St. Martin

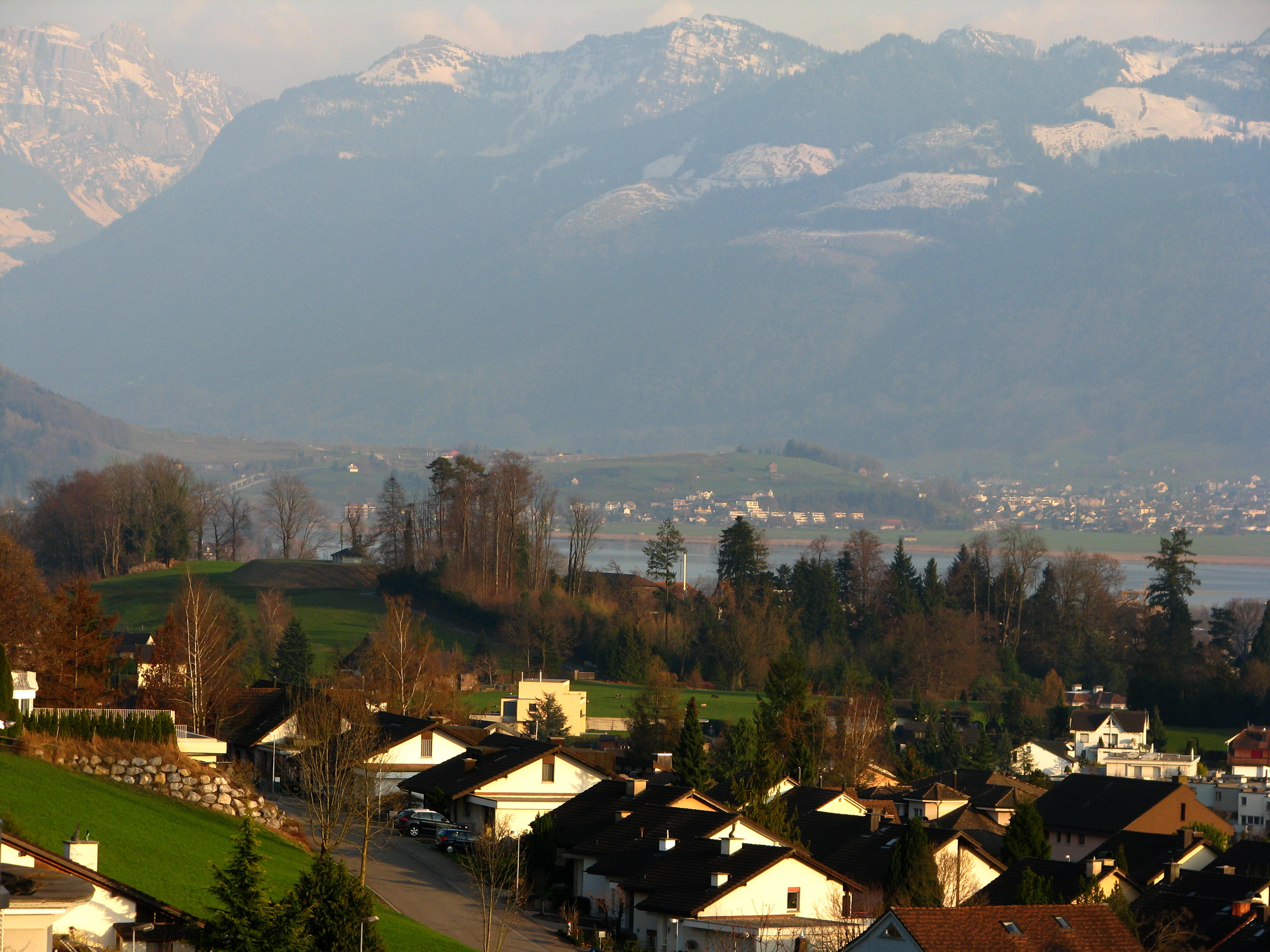
Meienberg hill

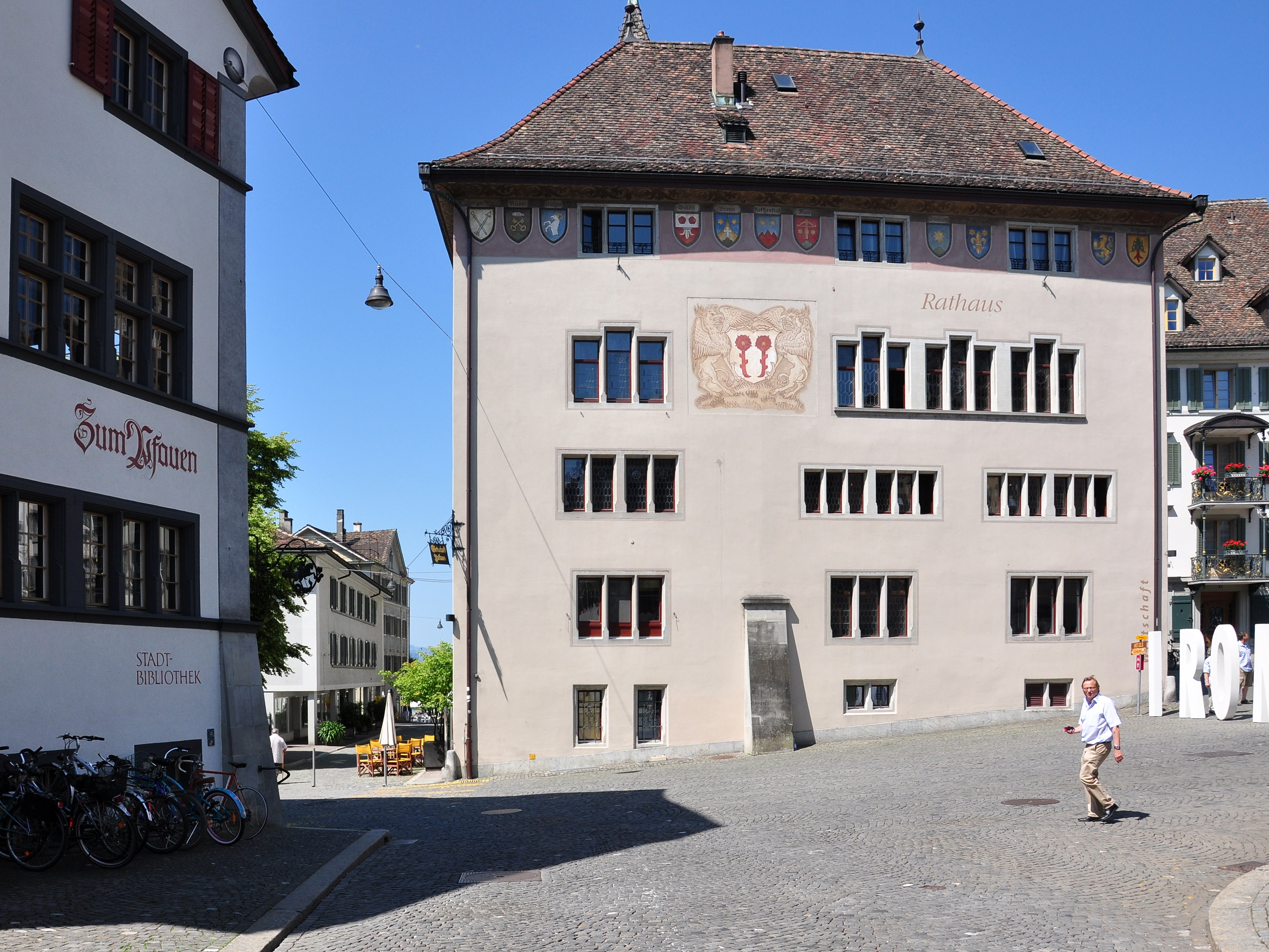
Rathaus (Town hall) of Rapperswil

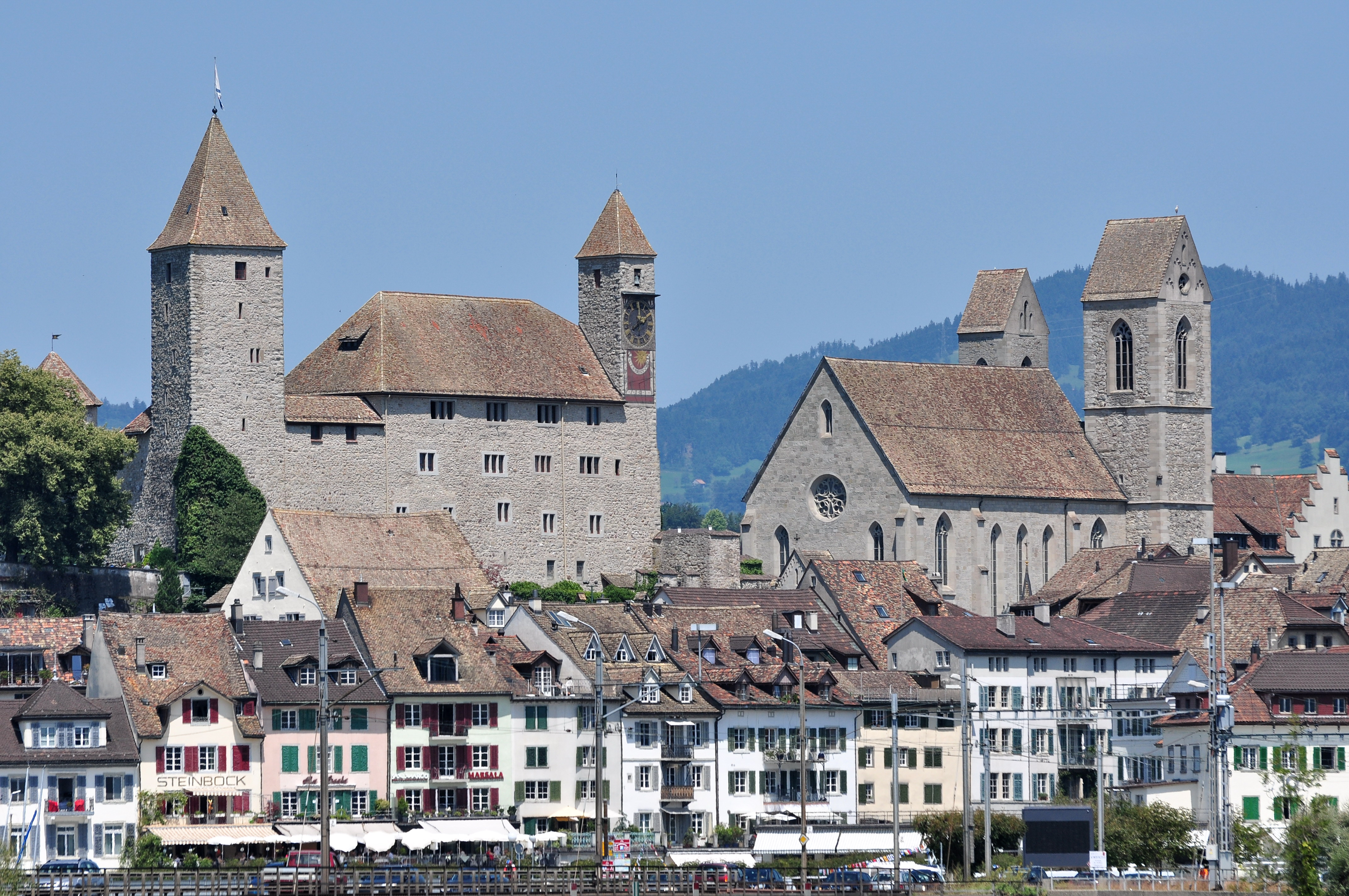
Schloss Rapperswil and Stadtpfarrkirche (St. John's church)

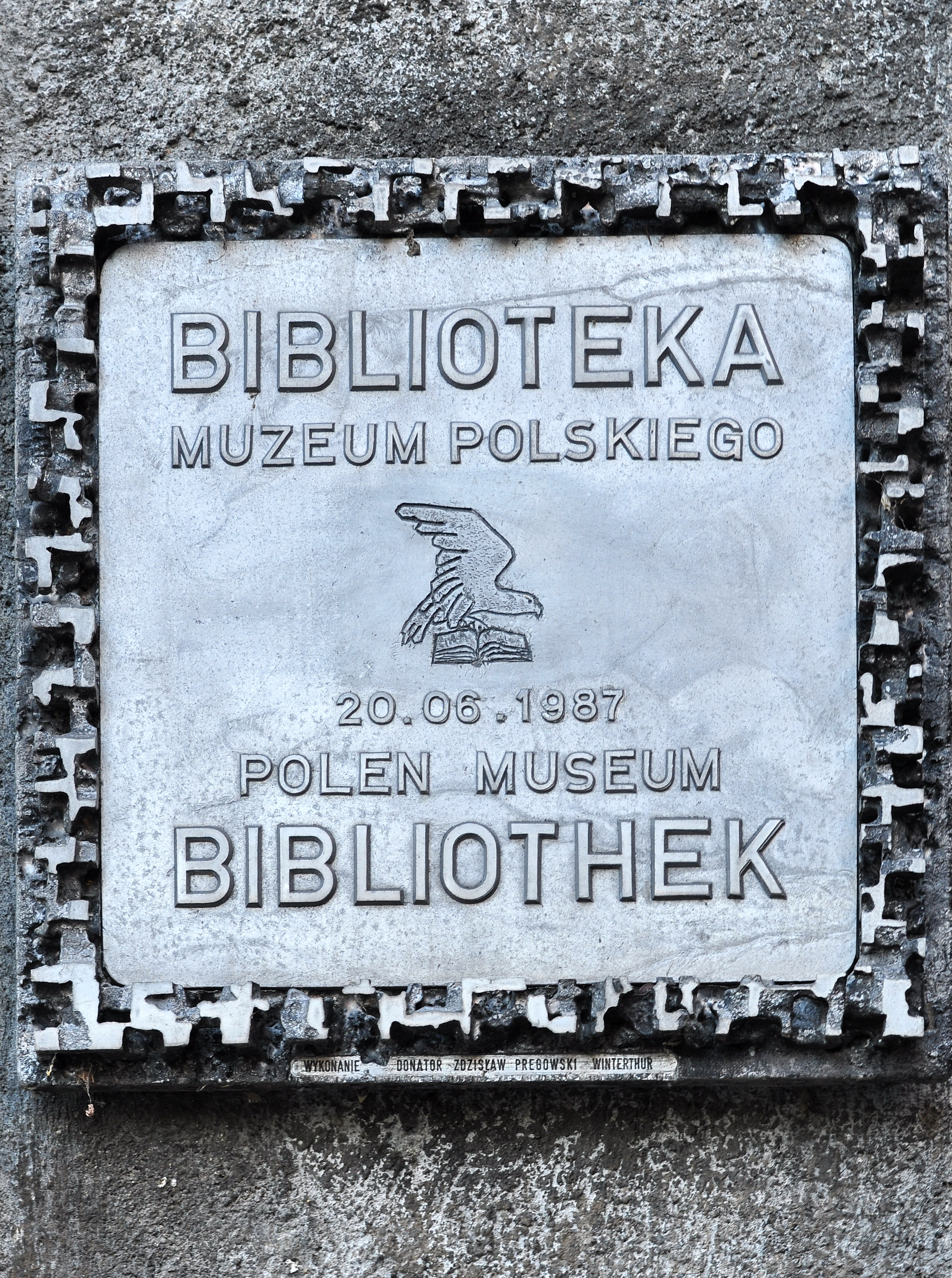
Polish Museum at the Schloss

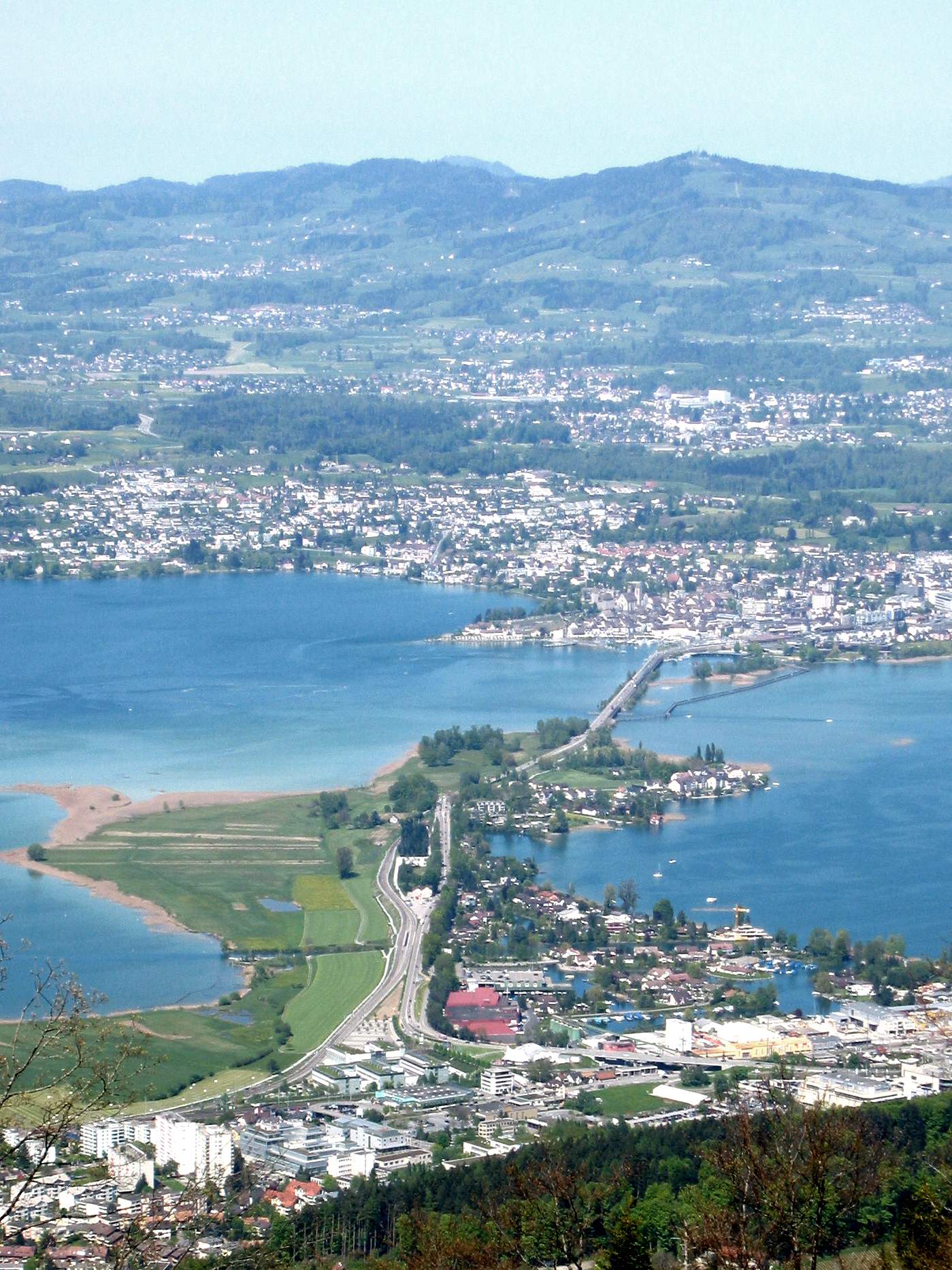
Seedamm bridge across the lake

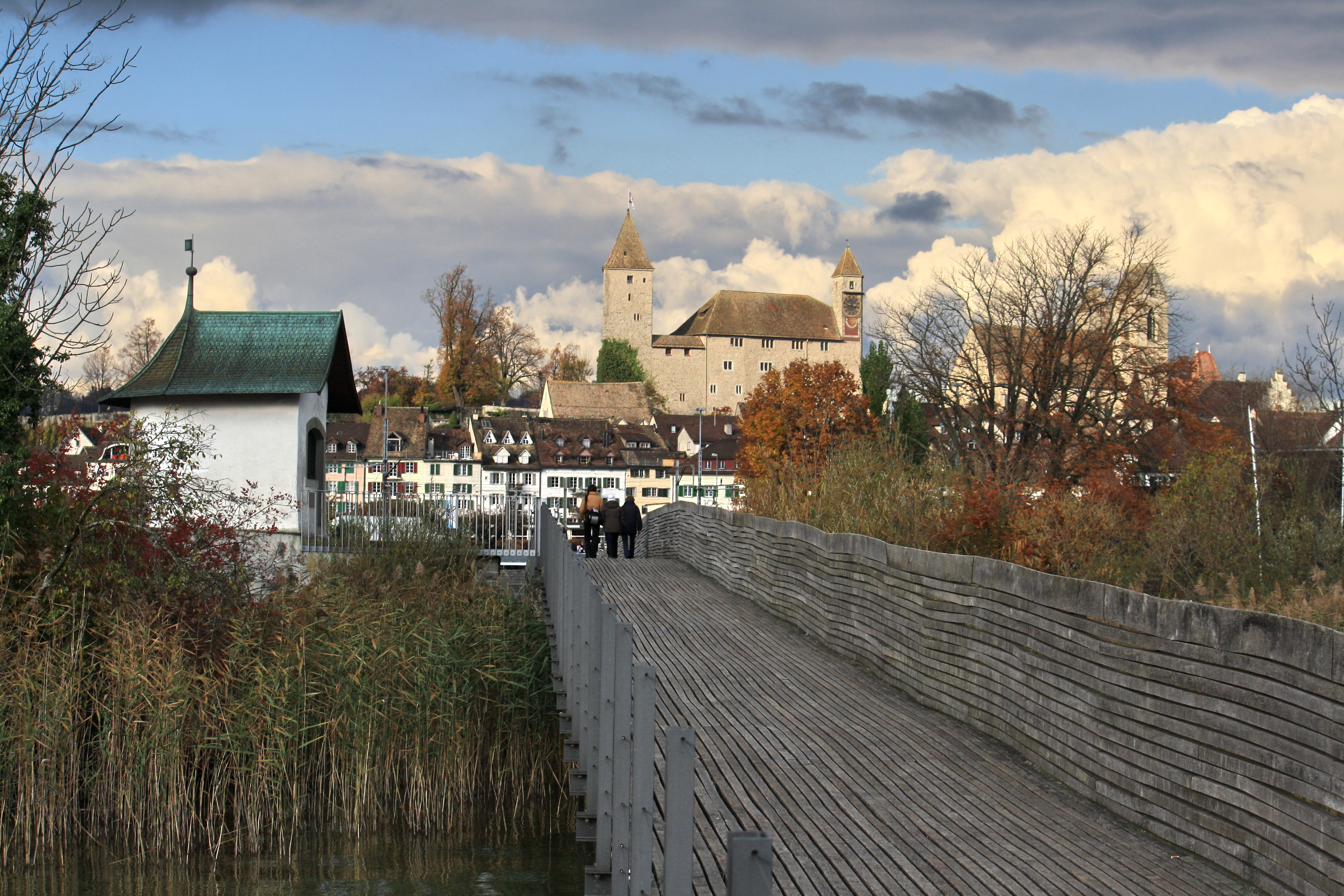
reconstruction of the original wooden bridge from c. 1525 BC between Rapperswil and Hurden

Aerial view (1954)

Aerial view (1962)

== See also ==
Settlements comprised by the municipality of Rapperswil-Jona

- Bollingen
- Busskirch
- Jona
- Kempraten
- Rapperswil

Points of interest

- Circus Knie
- Heilig Hüsli
- Hochschule für Technik Rapperswil
- Holzbrücke Rapperswil-Hurden
- Kapuzinerkloster Rapperswil
- Knies Kinderzoo
- Paddle steamer Stadt Rapperswil
- Polish Museum, Rapperswil
- Rapperswil Castle
- Rathaus Rapperswil
- Seedamm
- Stadtmuseum Rapperswil
- Stadtpfarrkirche Rapperswil
- Wurmsbach Abbey
