= Stadtpfarrkirche Rapperswil =

Coordinates: 47°13′39″N 8°48′59″E

Stadtpfarrkirche St. Johann
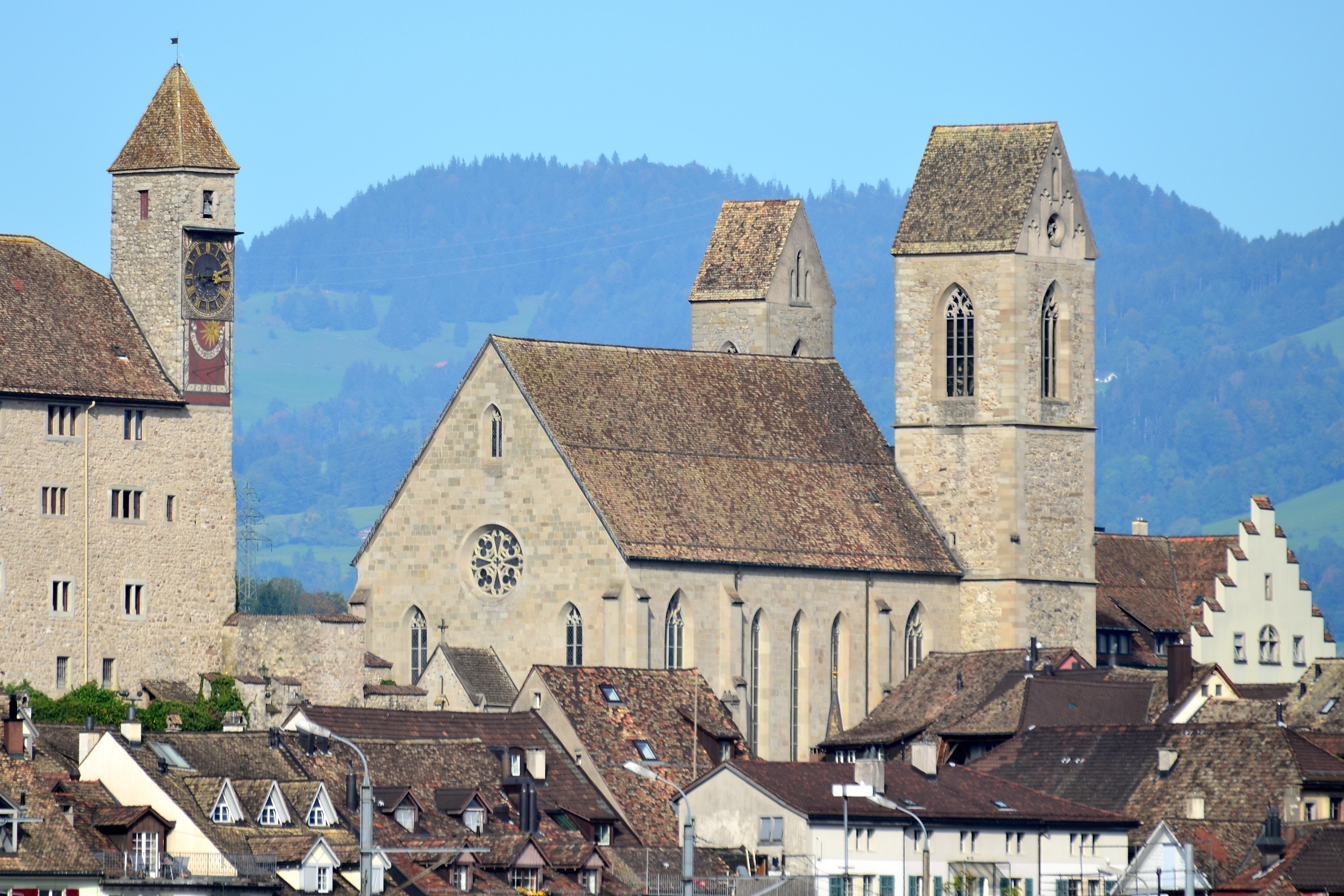
- Stadtpfarrkirche as seen from Holzbrücke Rapperswil-Hurden, the clock tower of the Rapperswil Castle to the left
- Stadtpfarrkirche St. Johann
- Country: Switzerland
- Denomination: Catholic Church
- Churchmanship: Parish church
- Website: Official website (in German)

History
- Founded: 1253 AD
- Dedication: John the Baptist

Architecture
- Years built: around 1229; 1383 extended; 1441 southern church tower; 1493/97 Gothic choir; 1882/85 rebuilt

Administration
- Diocese: Chur
- Parish: Rapperswil

Stadtpfarrkirche St. Johann (Saint John's parish church) is a Roman Catholic parish church in the city of Rapperswil, canton of St. Gallen, Switzerland.

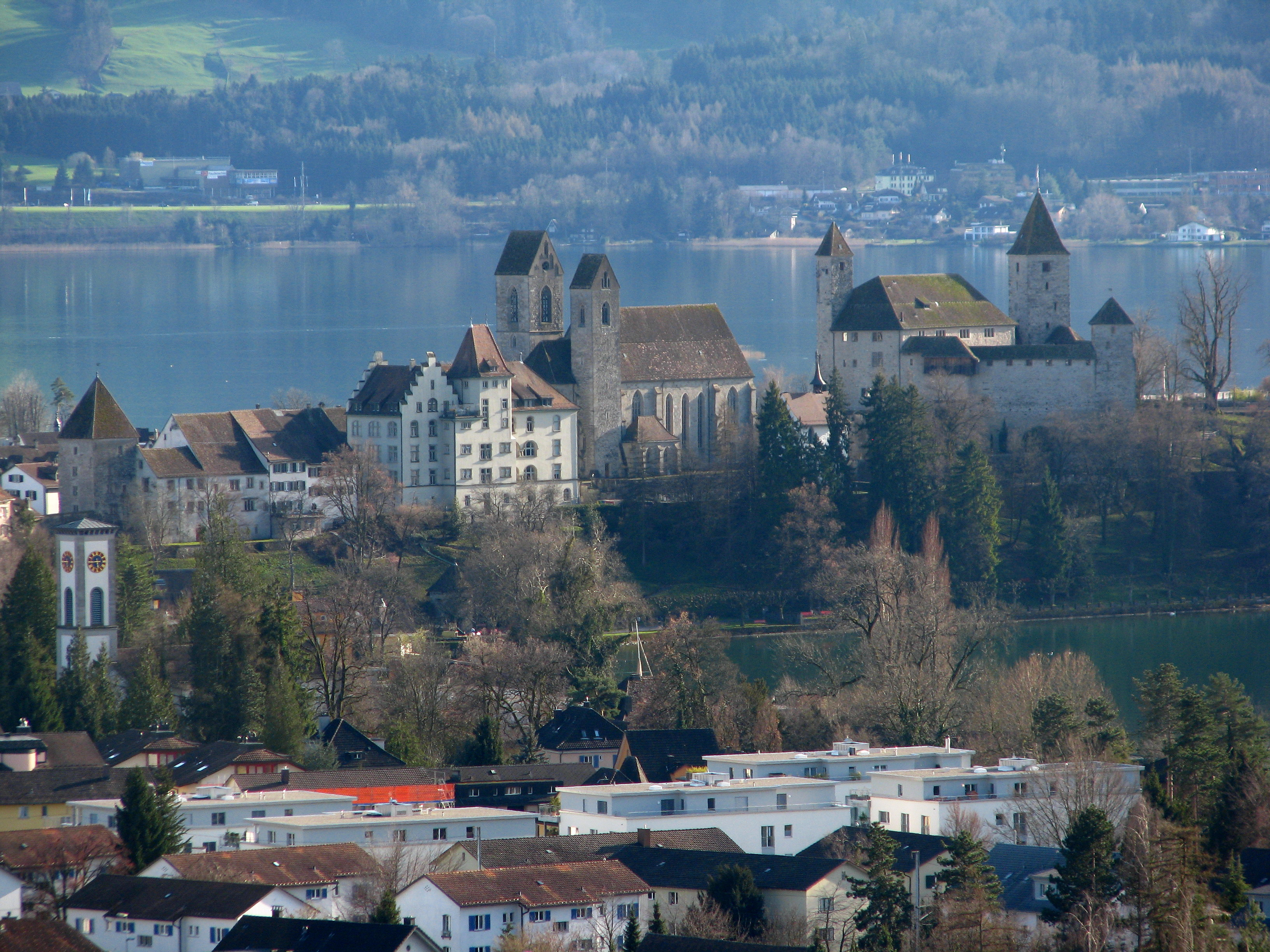
Herrenberg hill with Rapperswil Castle, Liebfrauenkapelle, Stadtpfarrkirche, Herrenberg primary school and Stadtmuseum Rapperswil, as seen from Kempraten, Seedamm and Hurden in the background

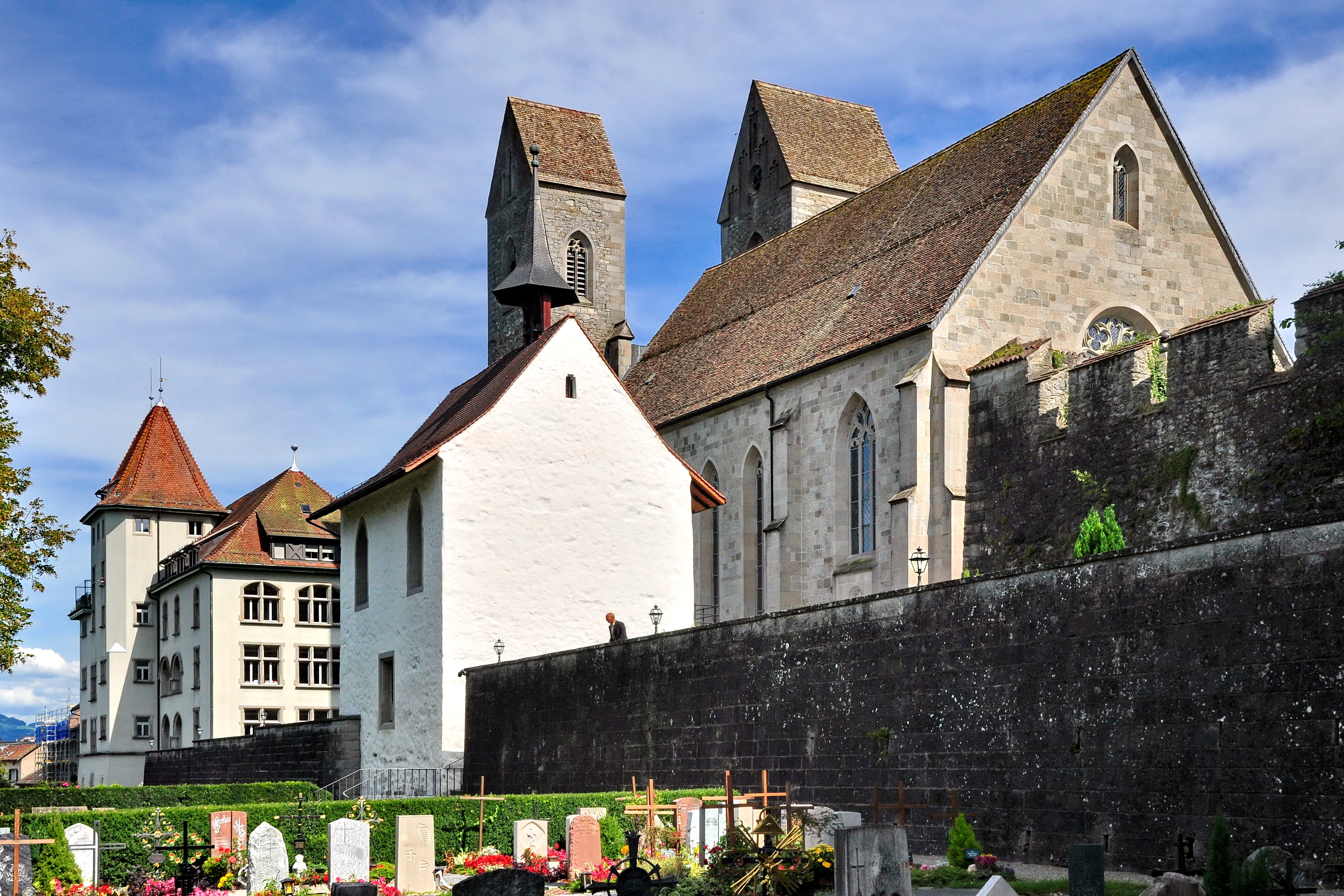
Liebfrauenkapelle, Stadtpfarrkiche and Schulhaus Herrenberg (to the left), as seen from the Catholic cemetery

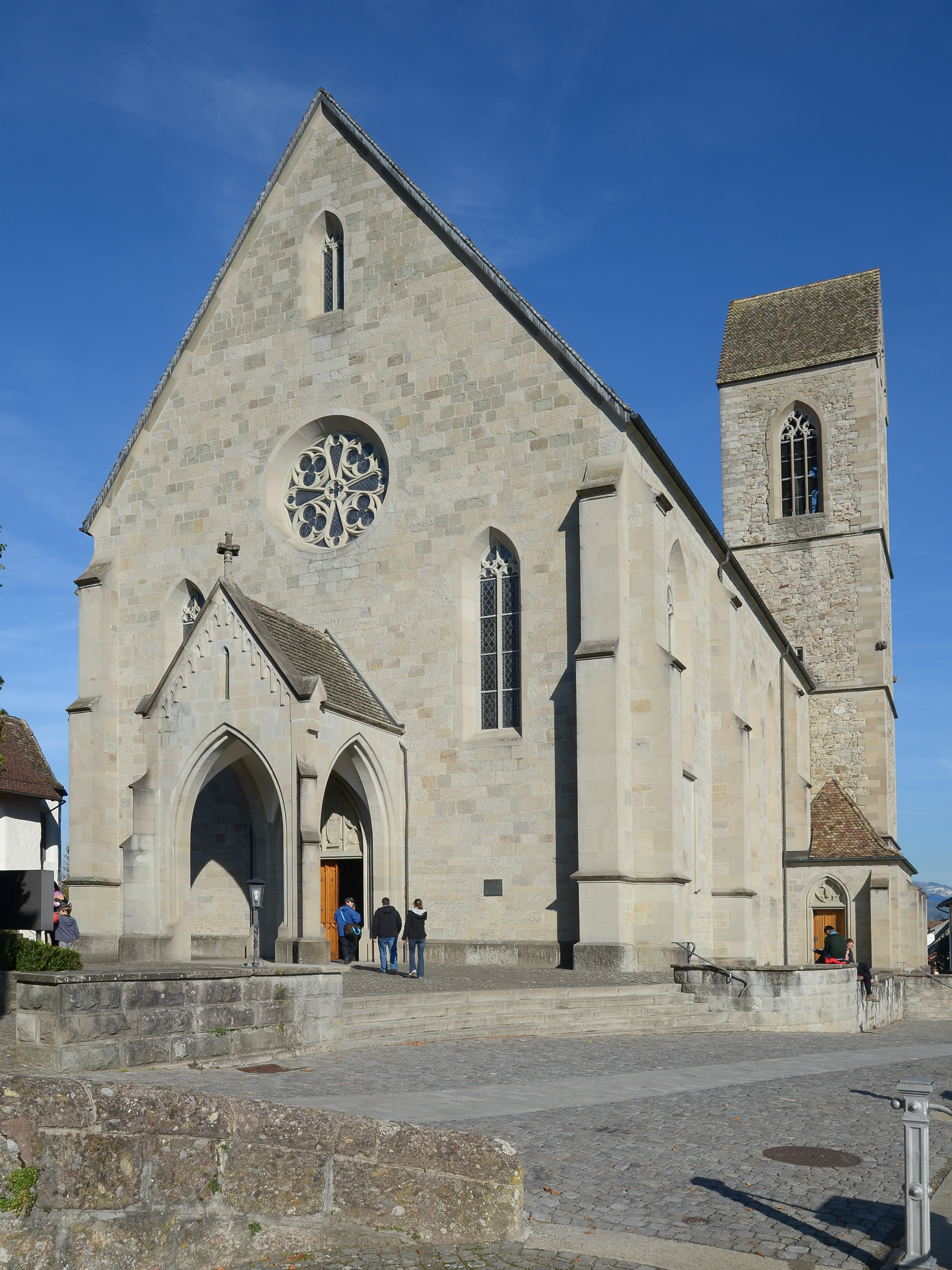
Church portal as seen from towards the castle

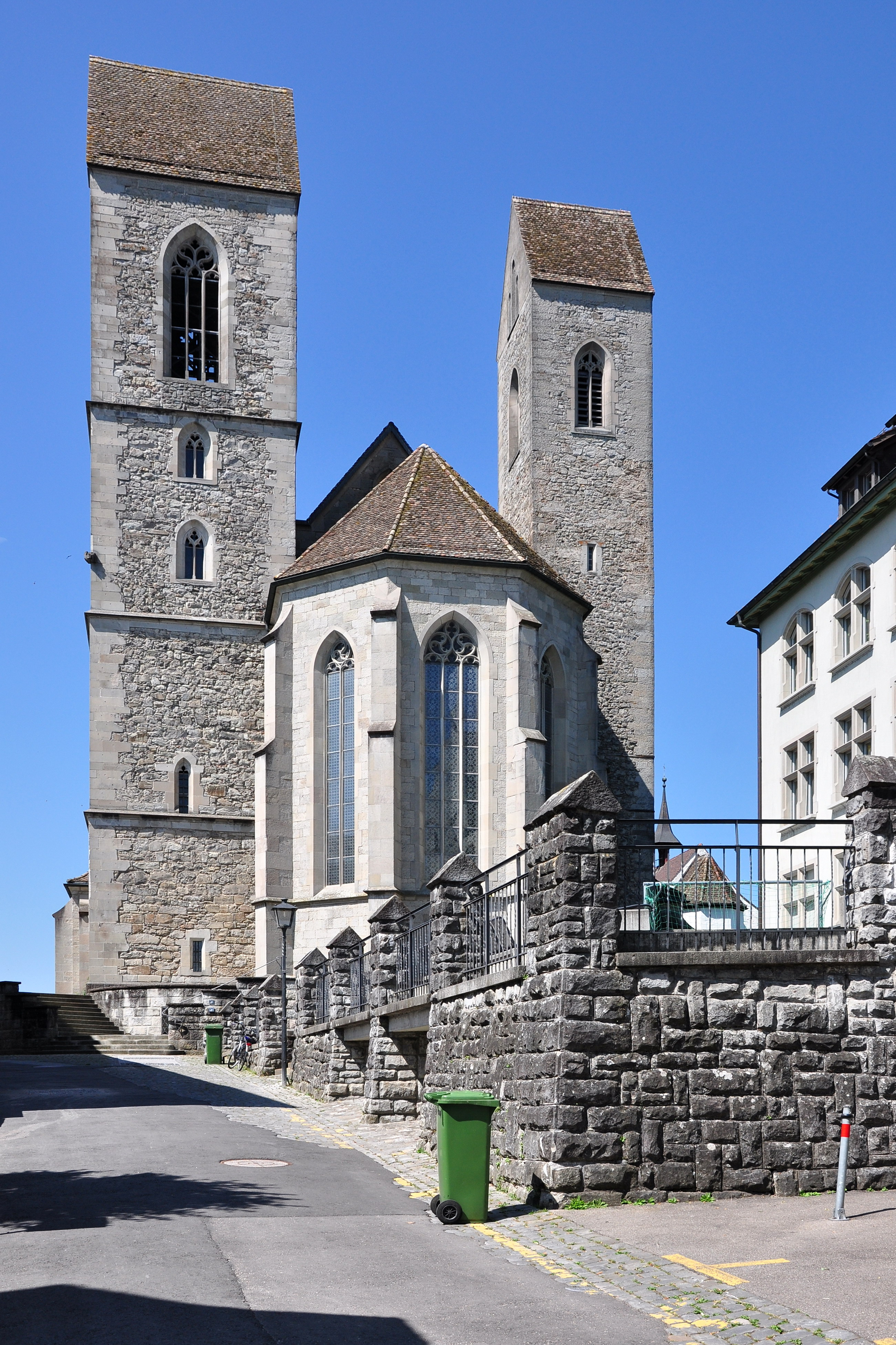
Church towers and apse as seen from towards the Stadtmuseum

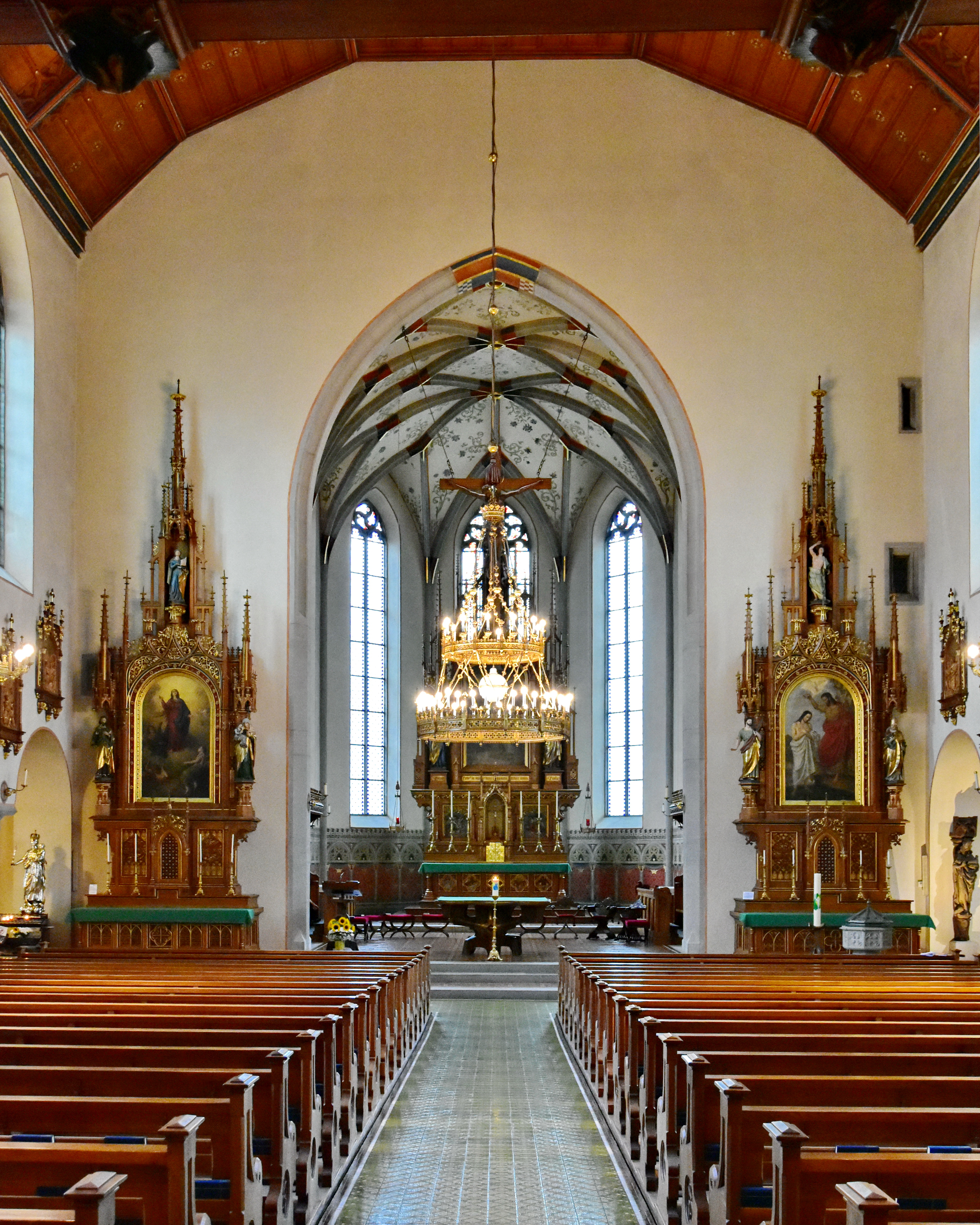
Interior, altars respectively apse

== Geography ==
The church is located next to Rapperswil Castle on the so-called Herrenberg hill to the northeast of Stadtmuseum Rapperswil. The Catholic city cemetery is situated to the north of the church, some meters to the northwest there is the so-called Liebfrauenkapelle (St. Mary's chapel) situated, built in 1489 on the former ossuary. As of today it's the cemetery's chapel and also popular for weddings thanks to its location overlooking Kempratnerbucht at Kempraten lake shore.

== History ==
Rapperswil Castle, the town walls of the former locus Endingen and the parish church were built by Count Rudolf II and his son Rudolf III of Rapperswil around 1220/29. The former parish church was located at Busskirch on upper Zürichsee lake shore, being one of the oldest churches around the lake area. Even the citizens of Rapperswil had to attend services in Busskirch until Count Rudolf II built his own parish church on the Herrenberg hill next to the castle. Legally, Rapperswil church was subordinated to 1253 the parish of St. Johann Busskirch and thus the Pfäfers abbey. In 1489 the adjacent Liebfrauenkapelle (St. Mary's chapel) was built, the cemetery chapel that still exists.

On 24 November 1446 Ellsbetha, gräffin zu Togckenburg granted a benefice (Pfründe) in the amount of 800 Rheinische Gulden to the Allerheiligen altar of the church, sealed by Countess Elisabeth and certified by Schultheiss und Rat der Stadt Rapperswil.

Since 1737 «Bruderschaft der hl. Caecilia und Katharina» (Brotherhood of St. Cecilia and Catherine) provides an enormous repertoire of church music for the parish among them around 1,000 compositions of the Rapperswil-born church musicians and composers Carl Greith (1828–1887) and his father Franz Josef Greith (1799–1869) who composed the Rütli anthem («Von ferne sei herzlich gegrüsst, du stilles Gelände am See»). On 30 January 1881 the church was partially destroyed by fire, and rebuilt from 1881 to 1885.

The very first roses in Rapperswil blossom at the southern wall and at the present Stadtmuseum Rapperswil next to the Schloss Rapperswil because their medieval sandstone walls are exposed to the sun all through the year.

== Architecture ==
The Romanesque hall church and the northern church tower were built around 1220/29 by Count Rudolf II of Rappperswil and extended in 1383 to the west. In 1441 a smaller but massively southern church tower was built. Collection campaigns in 1493/97 allowed to rebuild the hall church into a tripartite Gothic choir with arched ceiling and tracery windows. Following the Reformation in Switzerland, two Renaissance wing altars in the side chapels were added respectively latter moved to other chapels. Thus, these altars were not destroyed by fire on January 30, 1882, as well as the sacristy located in the southern church tower, along with the precious treasure of the church: masterpieces by the goldsmiths Breny from Rapperswil, Dietrich, Dumeisen and Rüssi Ysenschlegel, being one of the richest in the Linth territory.

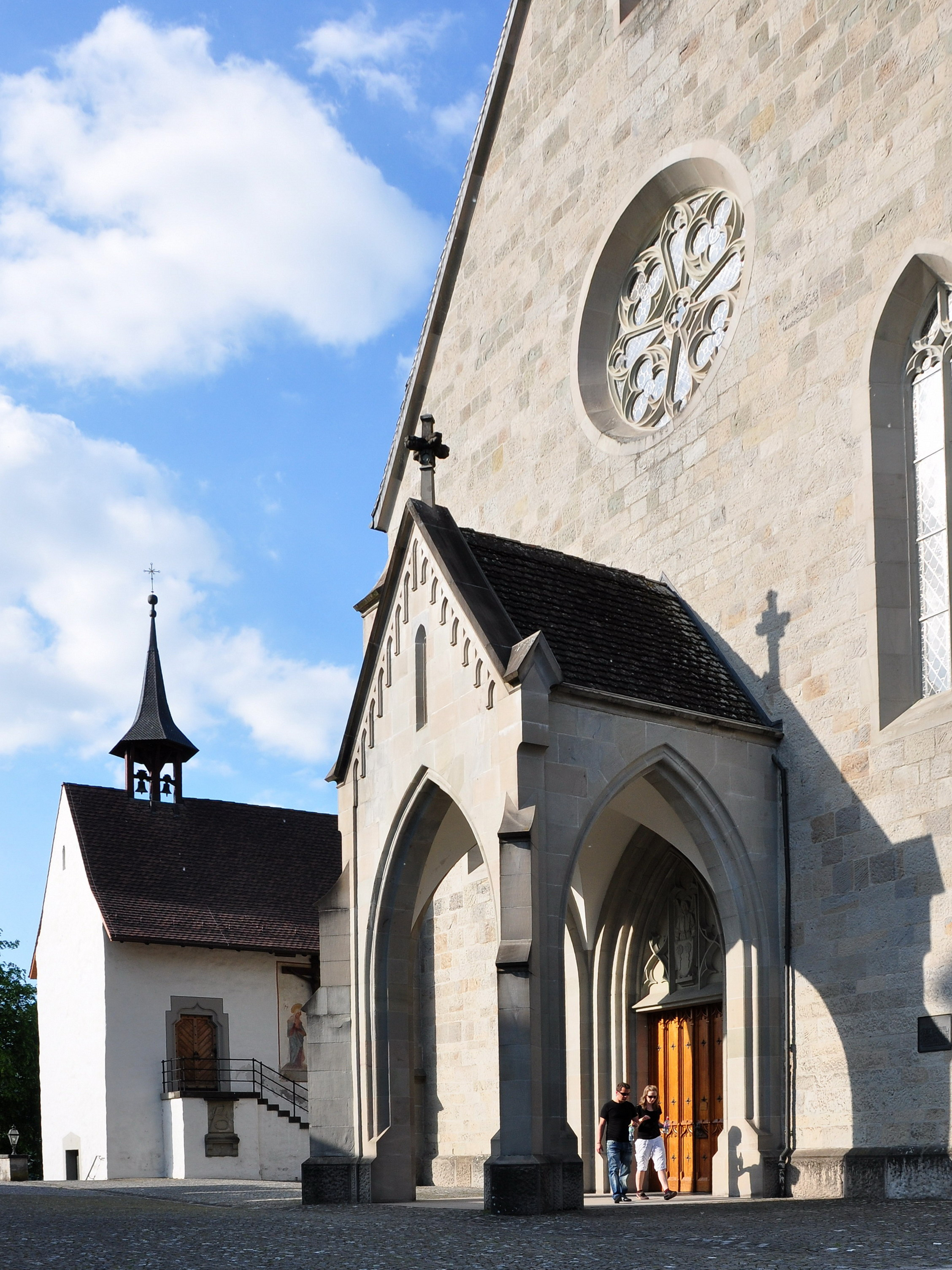
Portal and Liebfrauenkapelle

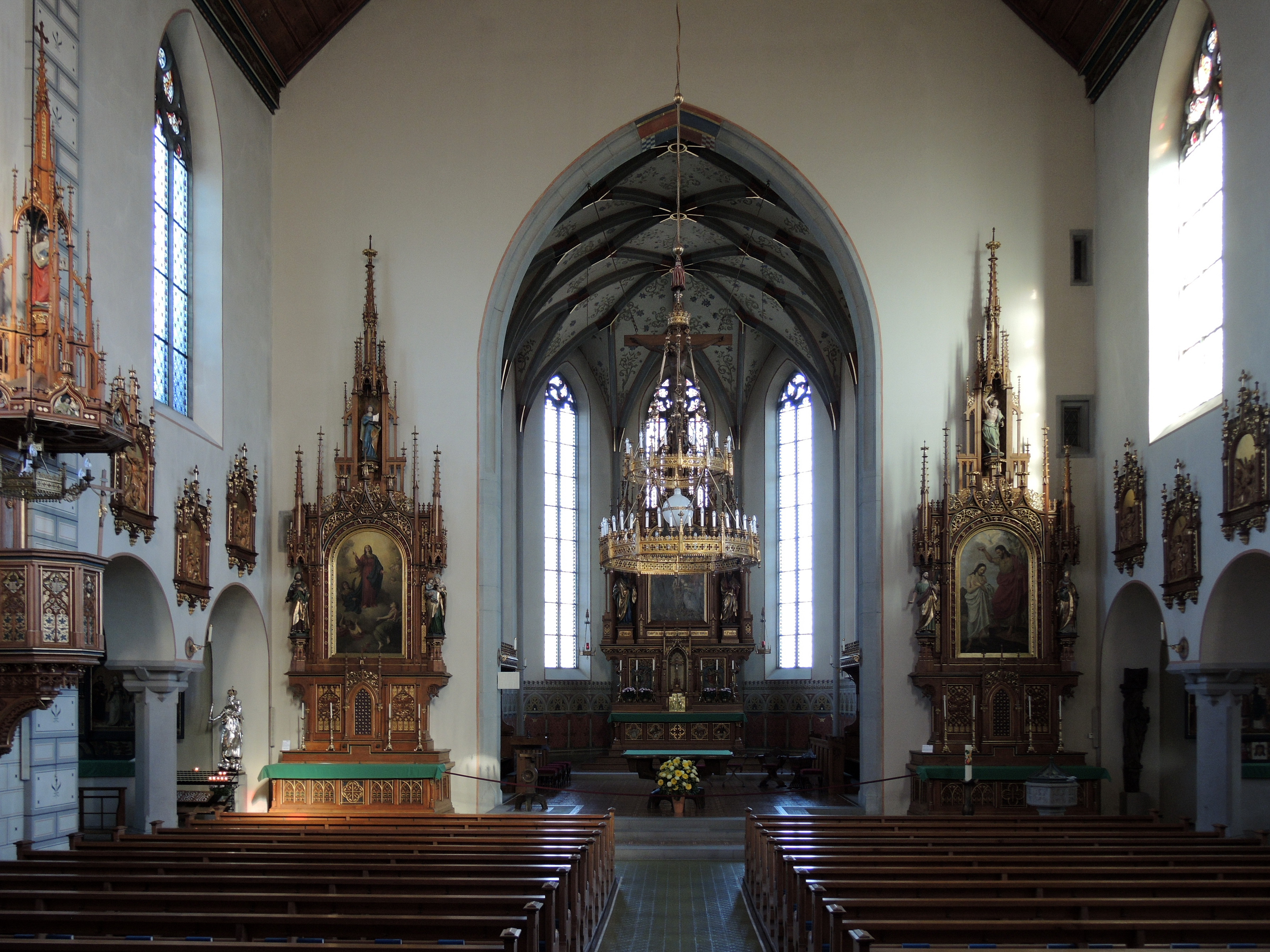
Main altar and side altars

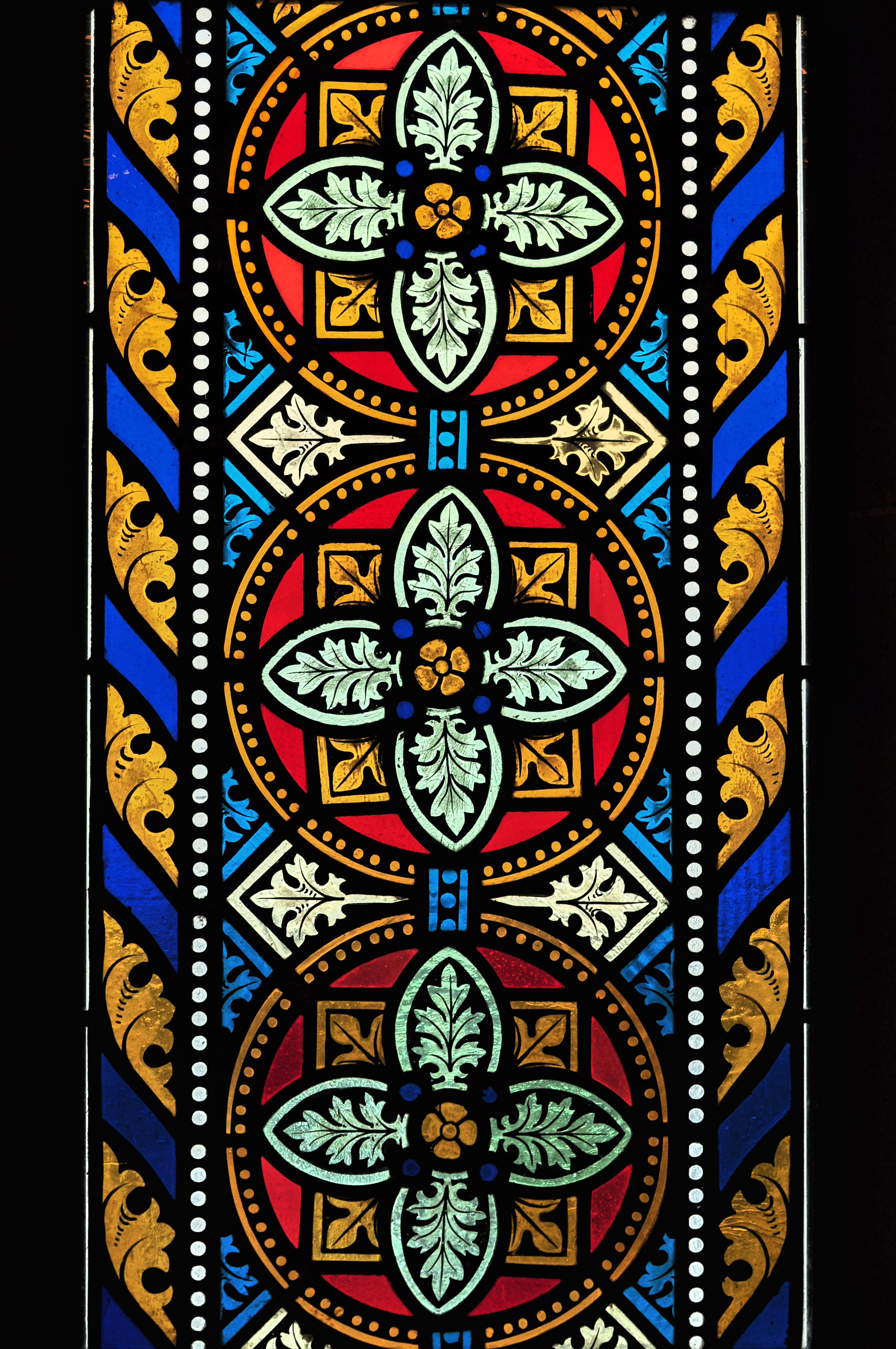
One of the church windows

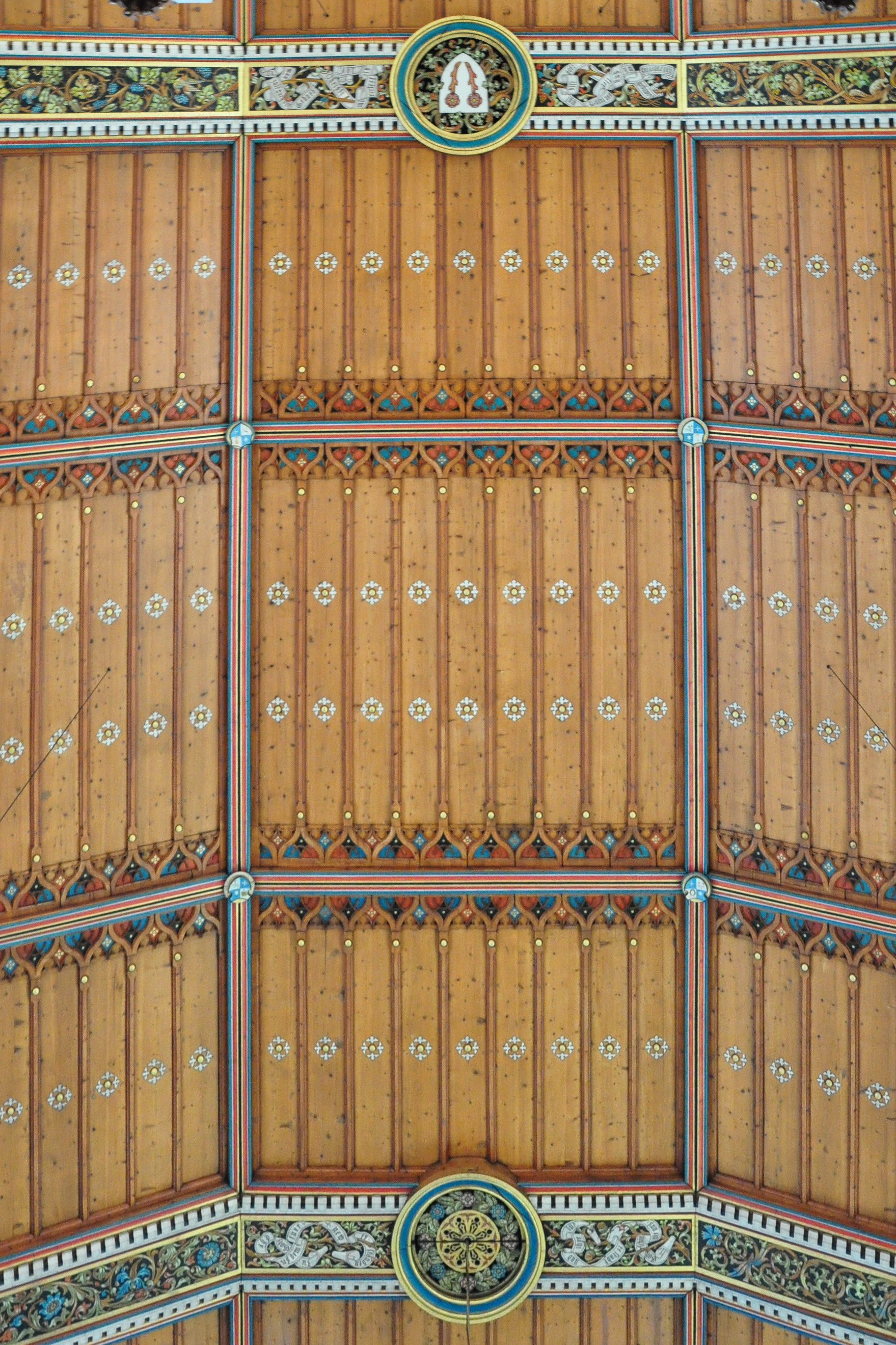
Church ceiling and chandelier

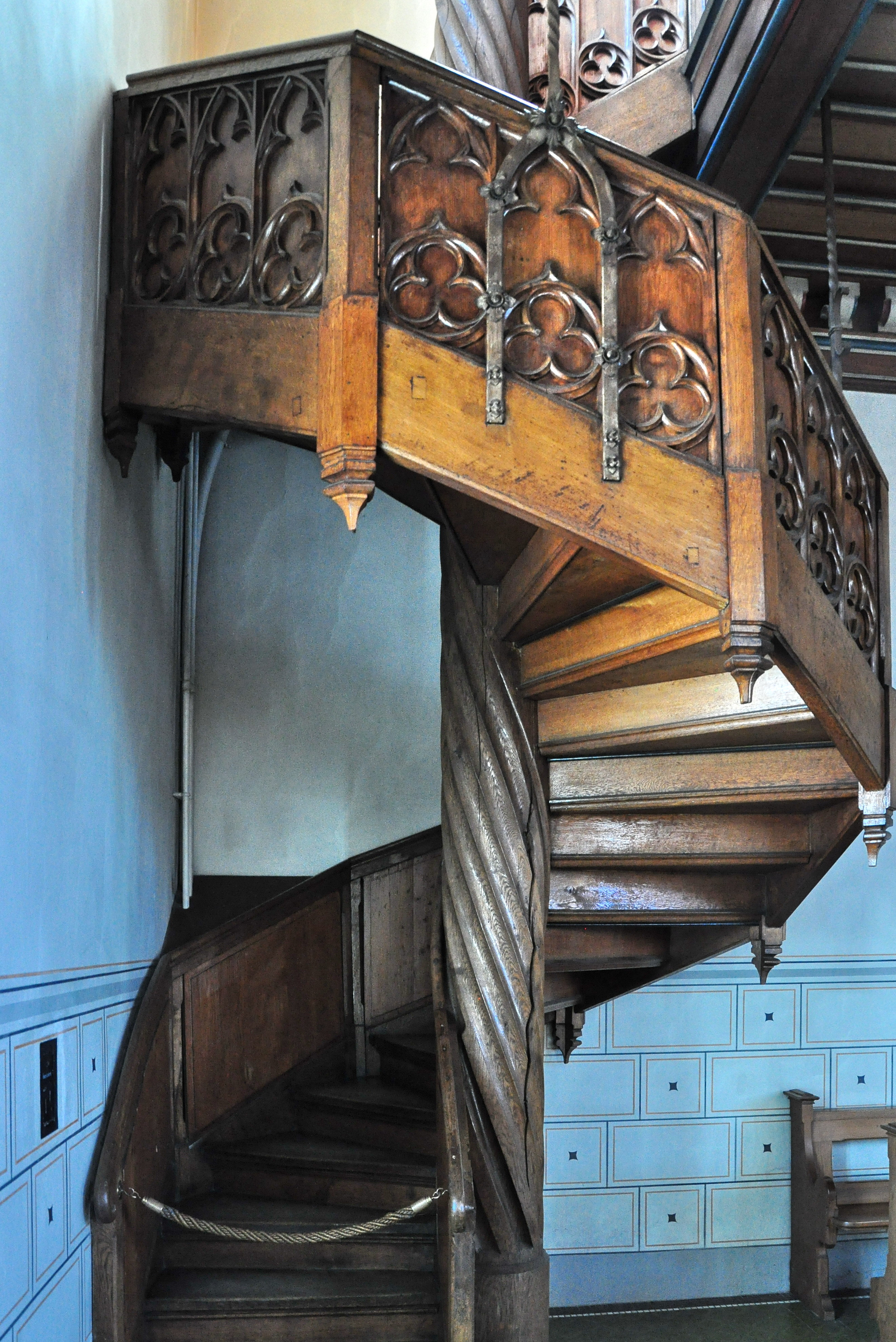
Wood carving at the staircase to the gallery

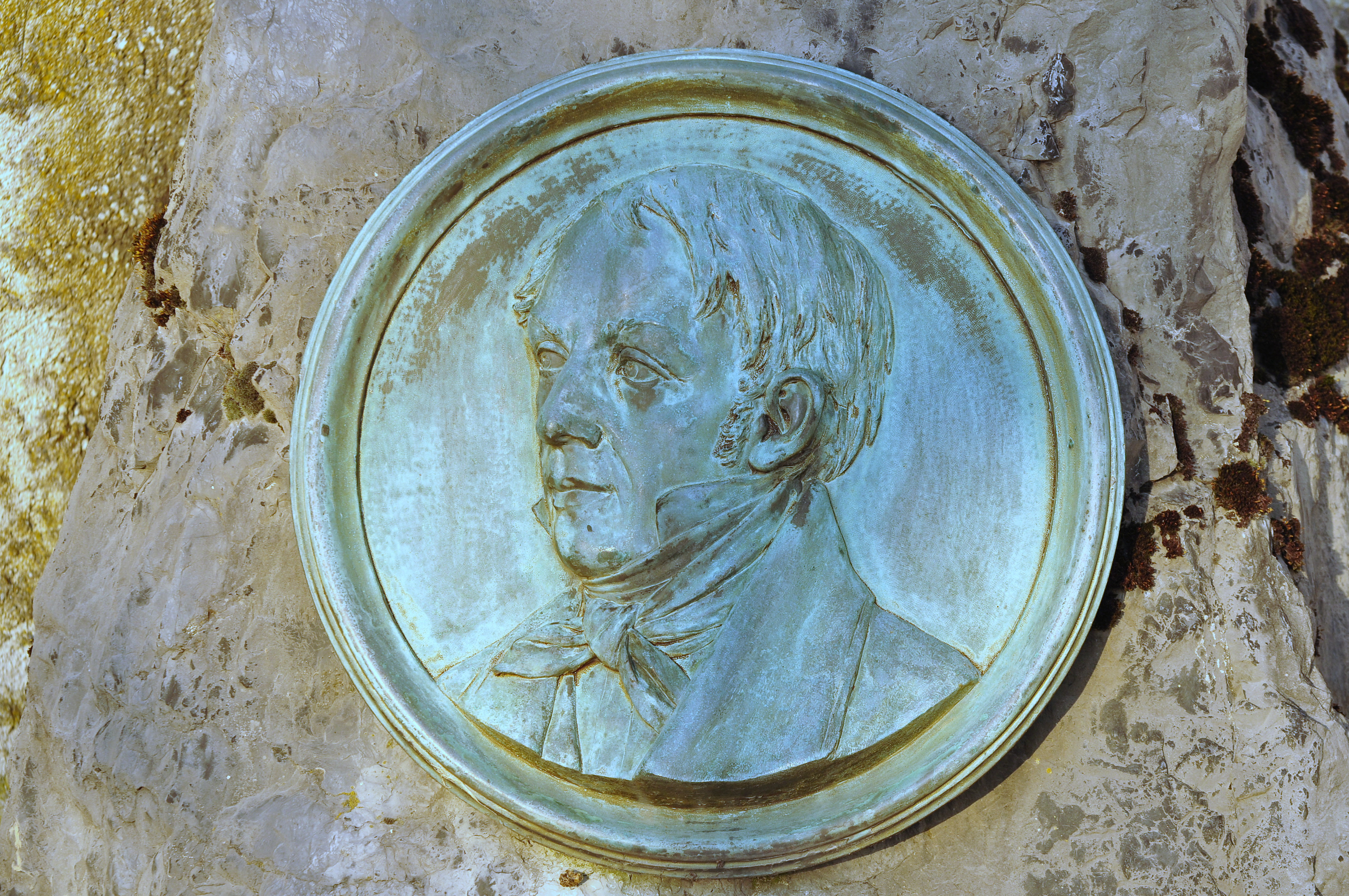
Franz Josef Greith memorial situated at Kapuzinerkloster Rapperswil

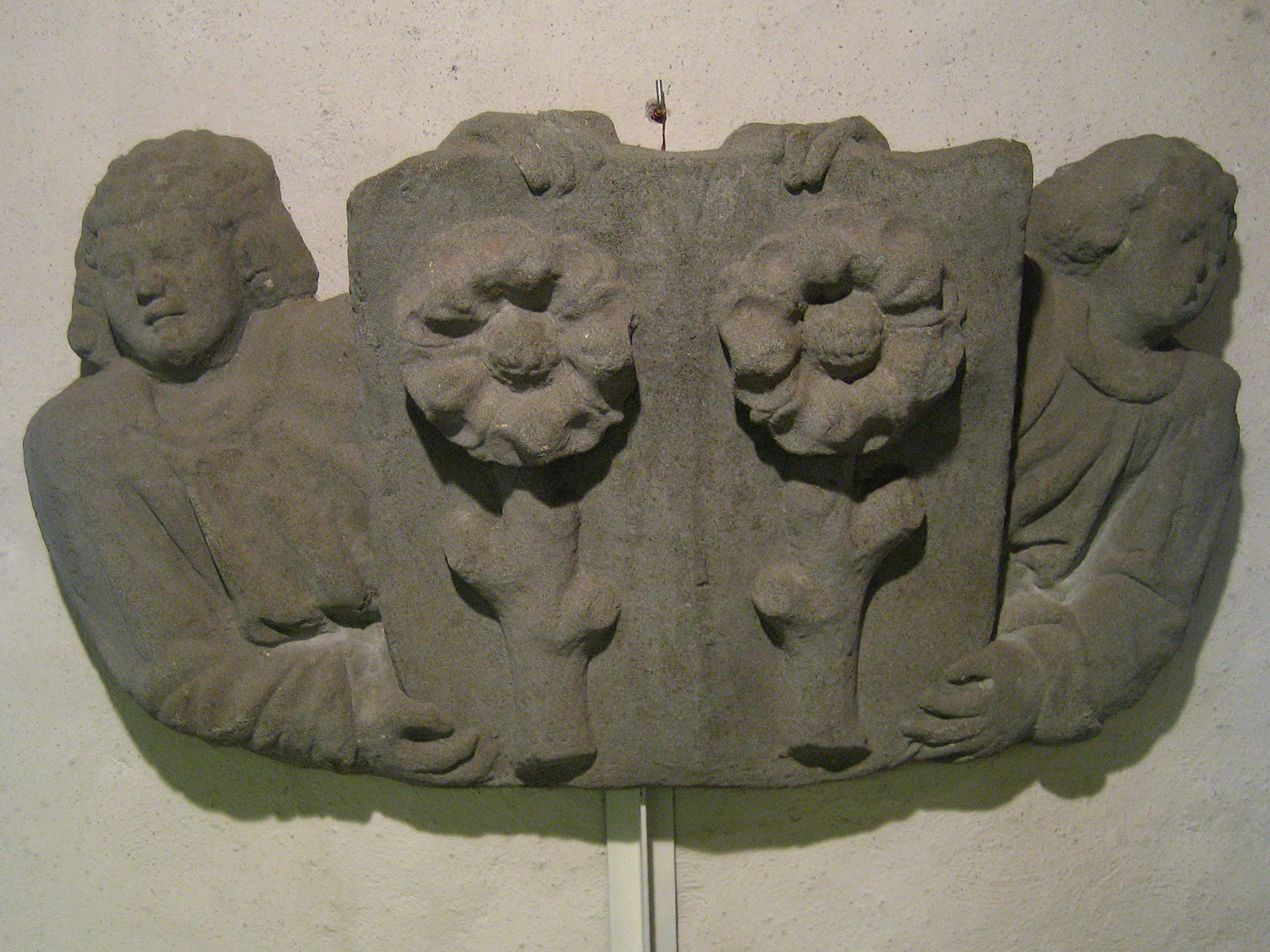
Coats of arms (around 1440/50) from the southern church tower

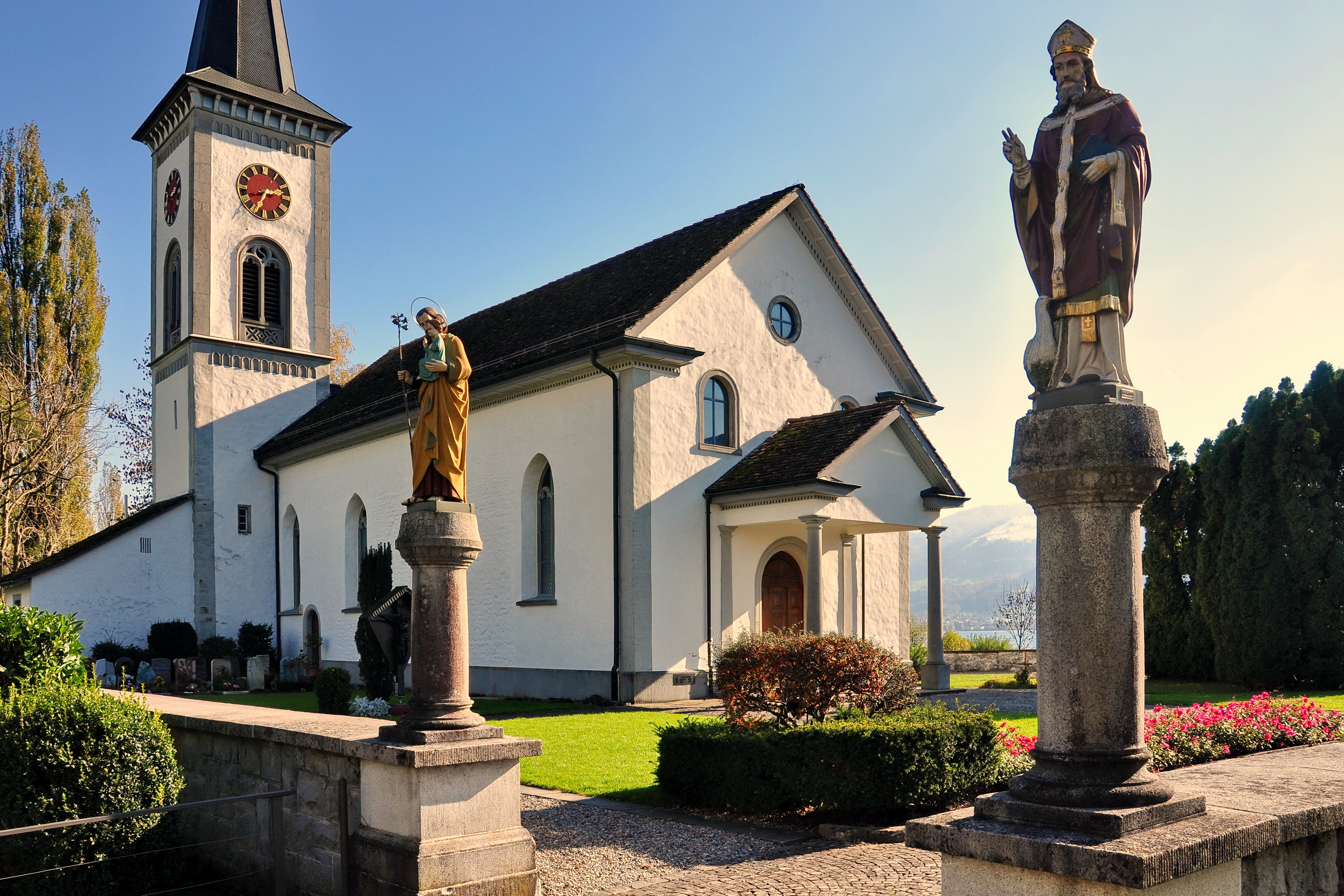
Maternal parish St. Martin Busskirch in Jona

Advised by the art historian Johann Rudolf Rahn, the architect Xaver Müller rebuilt the largely destroyed building. The obtained towers were increased by 1.2 metres (4 ft). A choir with neo-Gothic vaulting star was added, the nave extended by a few meters and a double wooden ceiling. The neo-Gothic altars and the pulpit are created by Atelier Marggraf in Munich. The rededication took place on October 6, 1885. The large chandelier was built in 1894 by the company Benziger & Co. in Einsiedeln. Renovations were done in 1959/60 (exterior and new bells), in 1971/73 and 1981.

The church bells in the large southern tower have a prominent sound by seven bells; one of 1537 and six were added in 1960. The bells weight about 16,000 kilograms (35,274 lb). On Saturdays at 3 pm for about eight minutes all the bells rung for Sunday.

== Pipe organ ==
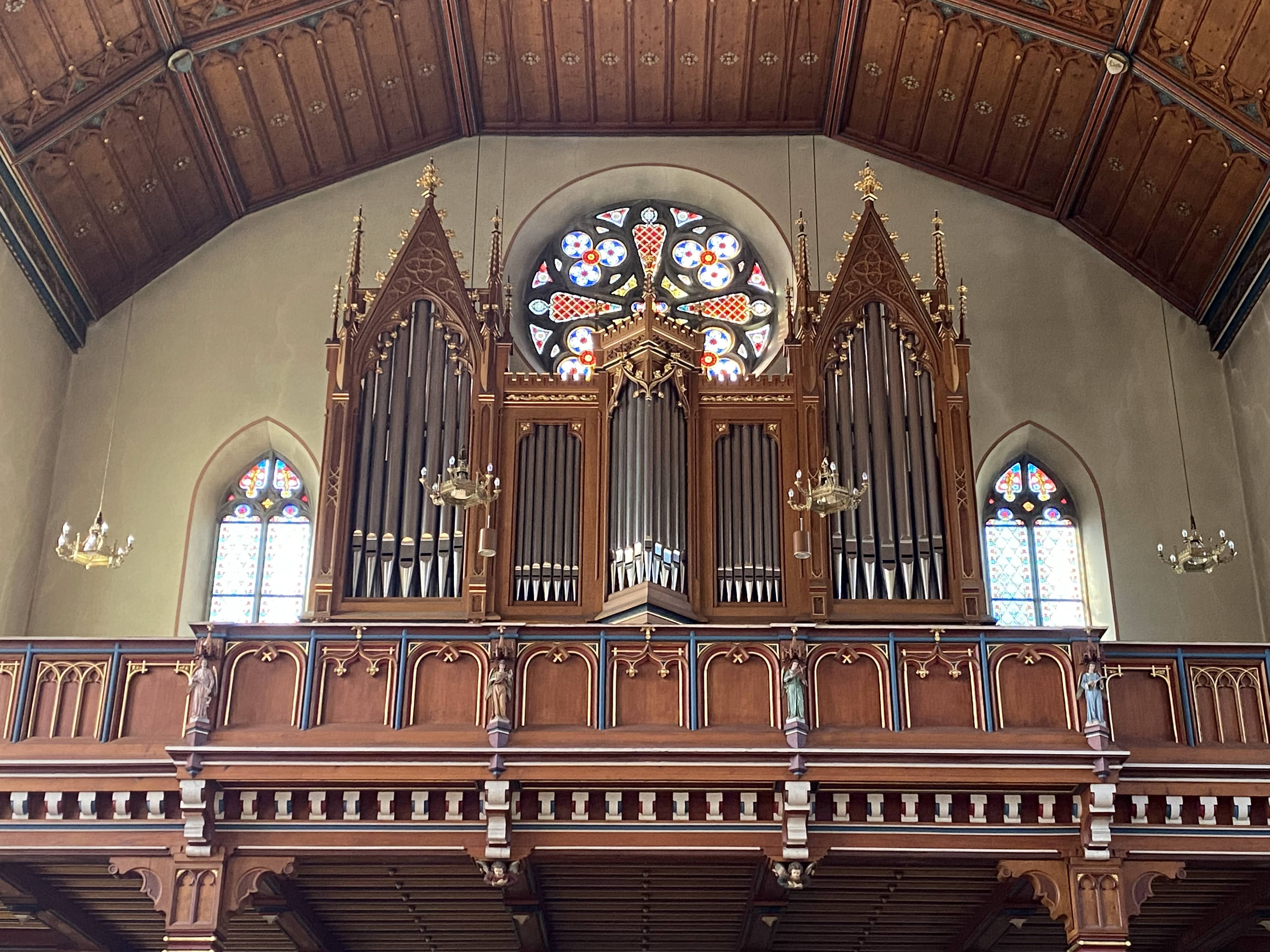
Gallery and organ

The pipe organ in the gallery was installed by Mathys Orgelbau AG in 1975.

I Schwellwerk C–g^{3}
Gedackt	8′
Gambe	8′
Vox coelestis	8′
Principal	4′
Traversflöte	4′
Nasat	2^{2}/_{3}′
Nachthorn	2′
Terz	1^{1}/_{3}′
Mixtur IV-V	2′
Fagott-Dulcian	16′
Schalmey	8′
Tremulant

II Hauptwerk C–g^{3}
Bourdon	16′
Principal	8′
Hohlflöte	8′
Octave	4′
Spitzflöte	4′
Octave	2′
Terz	1^{3}/_{5}′
Mixtur IV-V	1^{1}/_{3}’
Trompete	8′

III Oberwerk C–g^{3}
Pommer	8′
Fugara	4′
Rohrflöte	4′
Principal	2′
Larigot	1^{1}/_{3}′
Scharf II-III	1^{1}/_{3}′
Vox humana	8′
Tremulant

Pedal C–f^{1}
Principal	16′
Subbass	16′
Quinte	10^{2}/_{3}′
Octave	8′
Rohrgedackt	8′
Choralbass	4′
Hintersatz IV	2^{2}/_{3}′
Fagott	32′
Posaune	16′
Trompete	8′
Zinke	4′

== Parish ==
The parish St. Johann was founded by Count Rudolf III von Rapperswil in 1253, and is now the Catholic parish Rapperswil-Jona comprising about 3900 devotees and the area of the city of Rapperswil (Jona has its own Catholic parish). John the Baptist is the patron saint of the parish since 1253.

== Protection ==
The St. Johann church and Liebfrauenkapelle are listed in the Swiss inventory of cultural property of national and regional significance as Class B objects of regional importance.

== Literature ==
- Peter Röllin: Kulturbaukasten Rapperswil-Jona. Rapperswil-Jona 2005. ISBN 3-033-00478-4
