= Liebfrauenkapelle (Rapperswil) =

Coordinates: 47°13′39.3″N 8°48′58″E

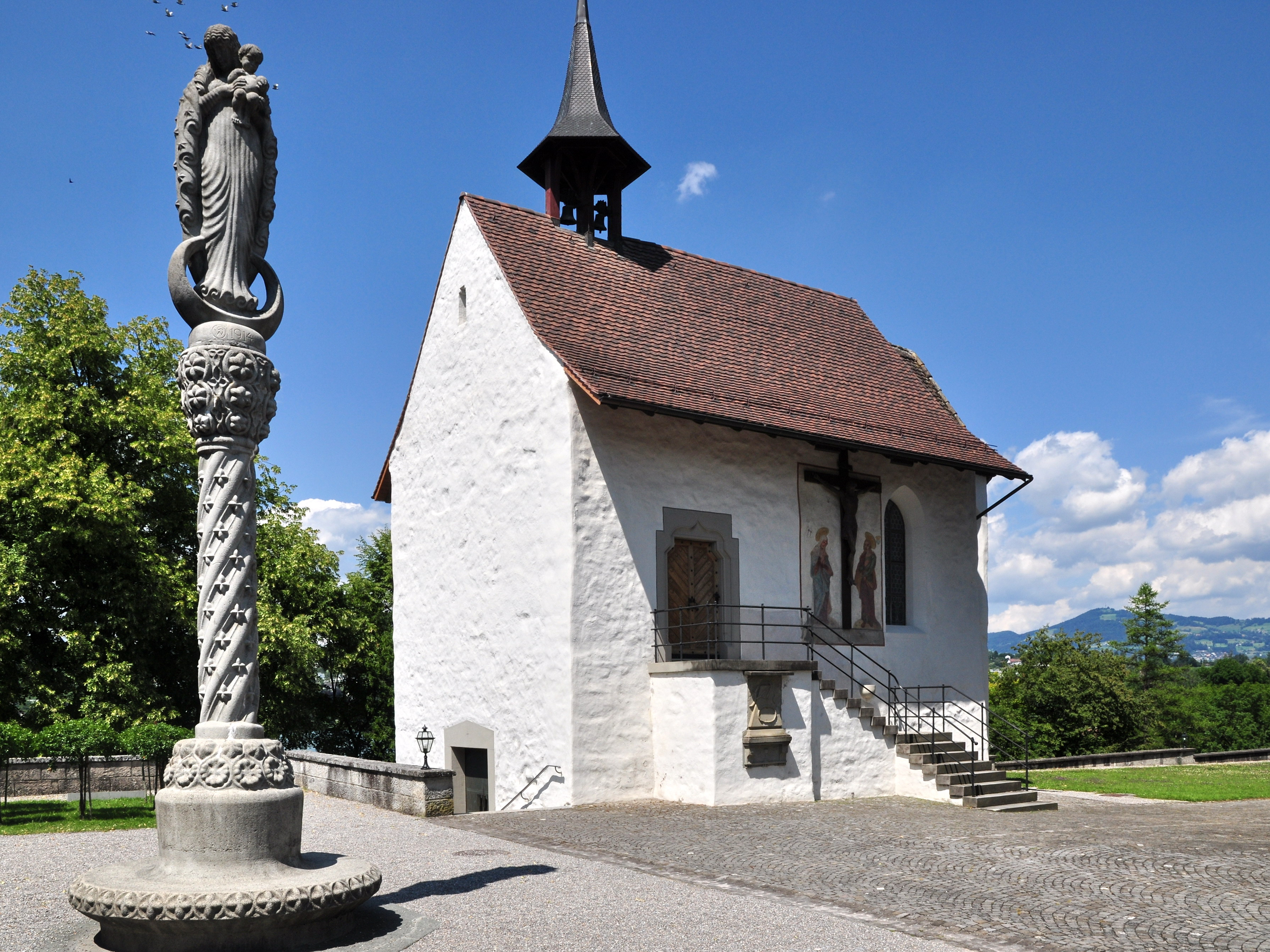
- Liebfrauenkapelle as seen from the Rapperswil Castle on the Lindenhof hill in Rapperswil
- Liebfrauenkapelle
- Country: Switzerland
- Denomination: Catholic Church
- Churchmanship: Chapel

History
- Founded: 1253
- Founder: House of Rapperswil
- Dedication: Mary (mother of Jesus)
- Consecrated: 20 June 1493

Architecture
- Years built: around 1253; 1489

Administration
- Diocese: Chur
- Parish: Rapperswil

Liebfrauenkapelle ("St. Mary Chapel") is a chapel in Rapperswil, Canton of St. Gallen, Switzerland, which dates back to the ossuary that was built by the House of Rapperswil around 1253 AD.

== Geography ==
The chapel is located next to the Stadtpfarrkirche Rapperswil (10 metres (33 ft) away to the west) and next to the Rapperswil Castle (20 metres (66 ft) away to the east). It is situated on the Lindenhof hill's eastern slope named Herrenberg, just 100 metres (328 ft) west of the Stadtmuseum Rapperswil. The Catholic city cemetery is situated to the north, hence, the chapel is used as cemetery chapel.

== History ==
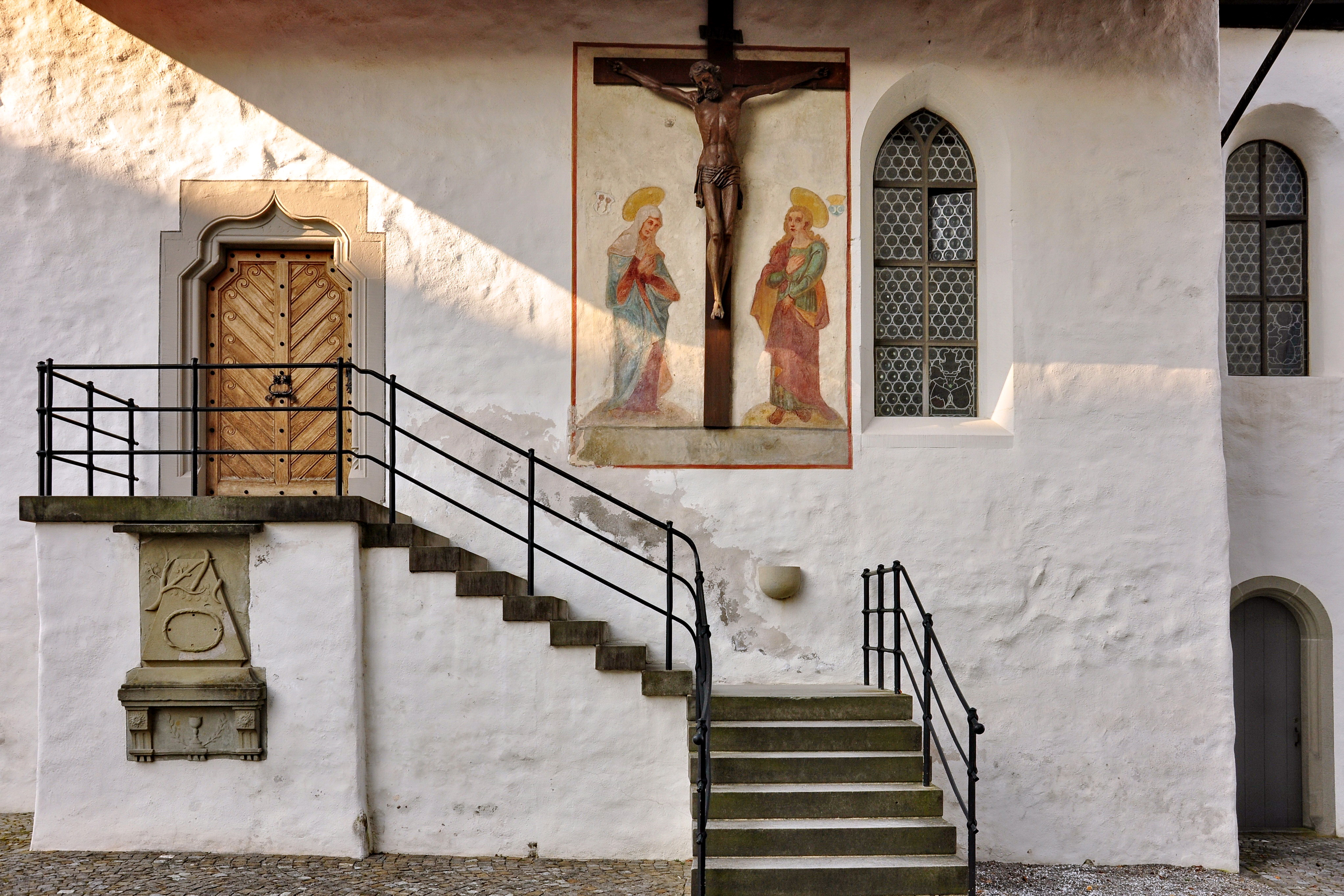
Staircase in the south and crucifixion scene

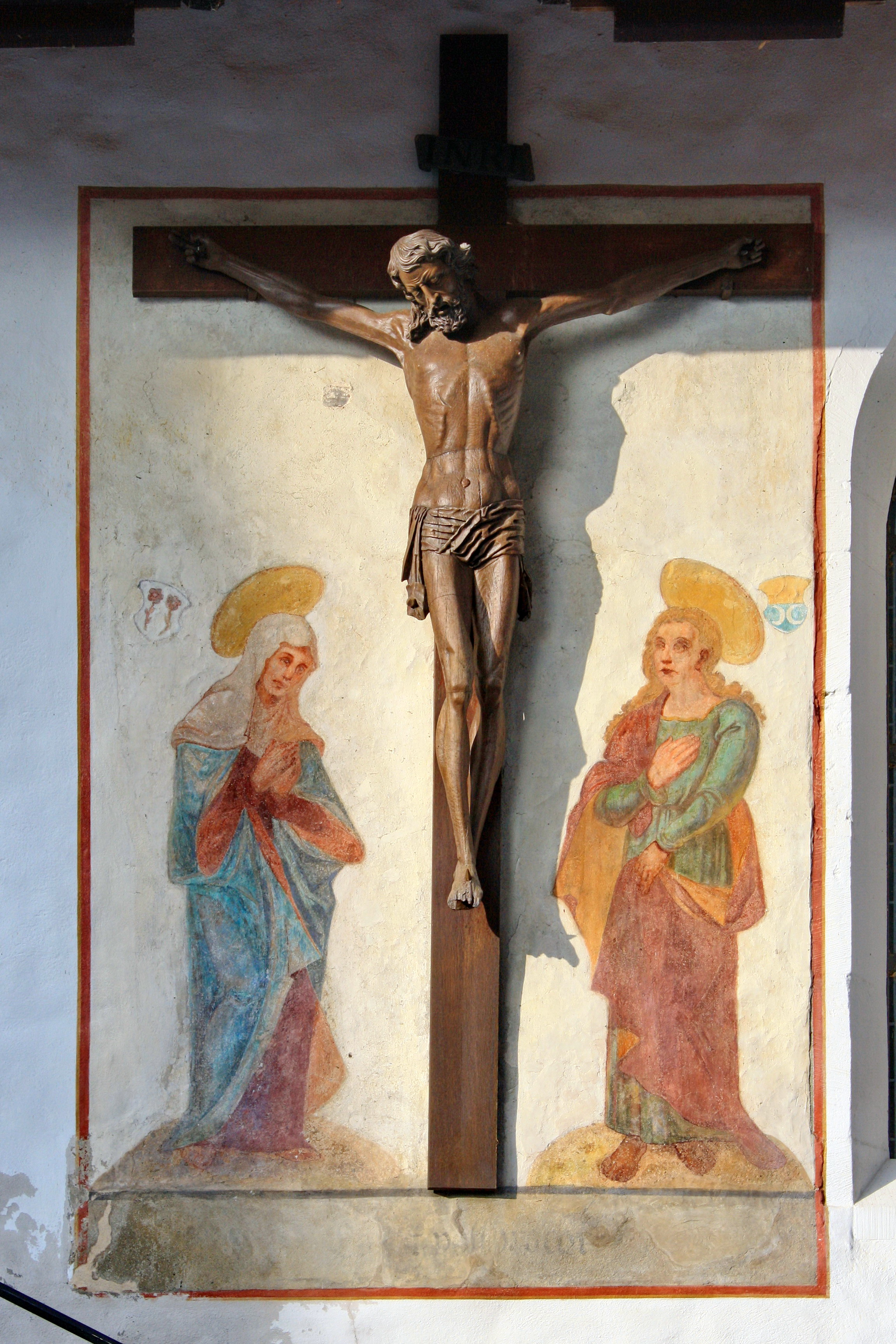
Details of the crucifixion scene showing Maria and Magdalena

The chapel respectively the ossuary was built around 1253 or earlier when the parish passed from the Busskirch church to the Rapperswil church and accordingly a cemetery was established inside the town walls of the medieval city of Rapperswil. The first chapel was associated to the Rapperswil Castle, but it was built outside of the castle's walls, as a castle chapel for its inhabitants, probably as the family chapel for the members of the House of Rapperswil, later also for the citizens of Rapperswil. The preceding building of the Liebfrauenkapelle was built as an ossuary around 1220 to 1253. The charnel house was first mentioned as intra cymeterium ecclesia, meaning the church in the cemetery. The present chapel was erected above the ossuary, and latter was rebuilt in our times into a funeral service room. In the second half of the 15th century, the supposedly preceding building (maybe the second one) was mentioned as capellum novam in ceometerio ("new cemetery chapel"). From the ossuary a staircase led in the overlying interior of the chapel; in turn, the access to the ossuary took place from the south via another staircase. The construction of the new building, presumably the third construction phase of the small church, was initiated by the religious Brotherhood of Our Lady (German: Bruderschaft Unserer Lieben Frau) which was founded in 1489 to probably finance the present Liebfrauenkapelle.

== Architecture ==
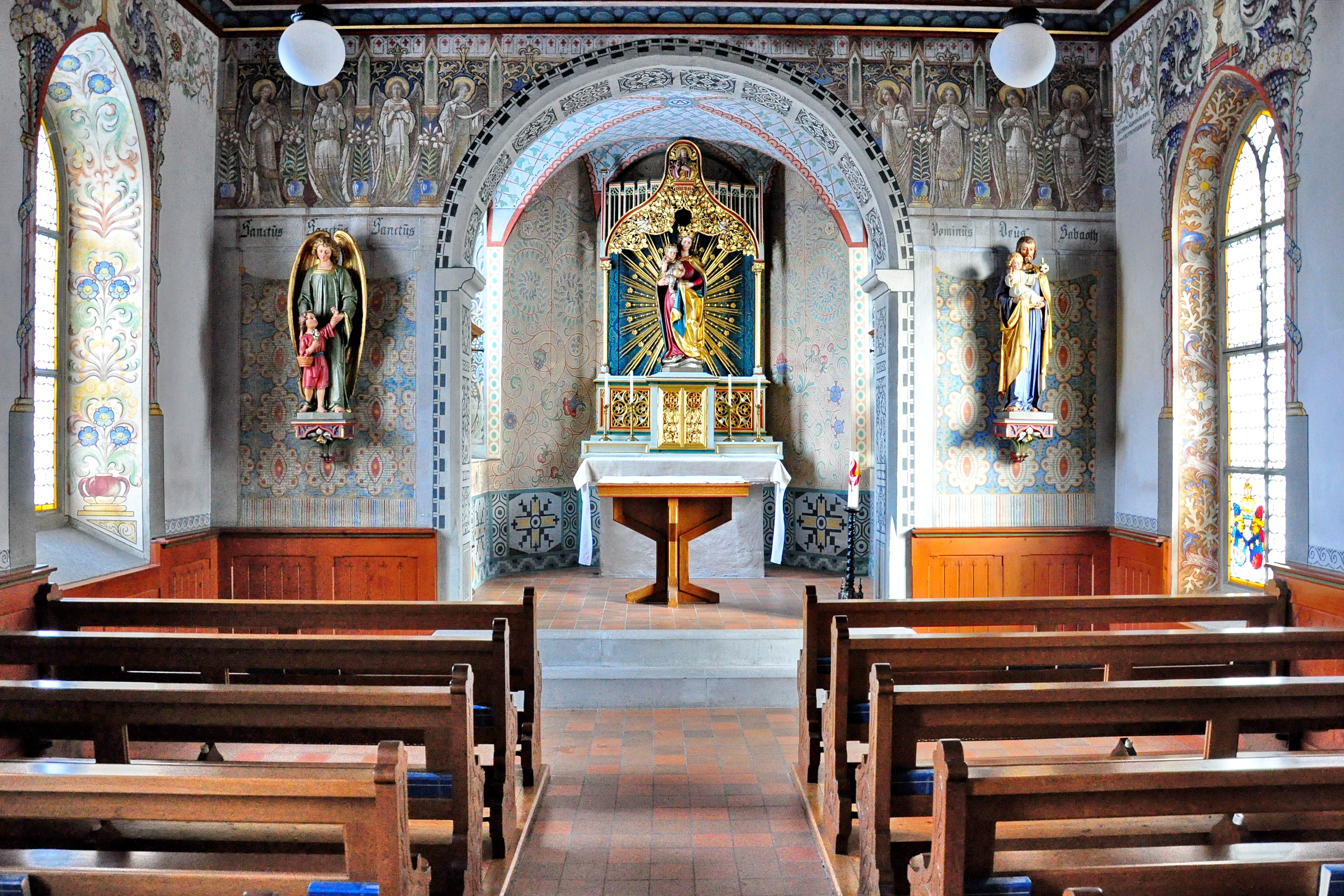
Interior view towards the small altar

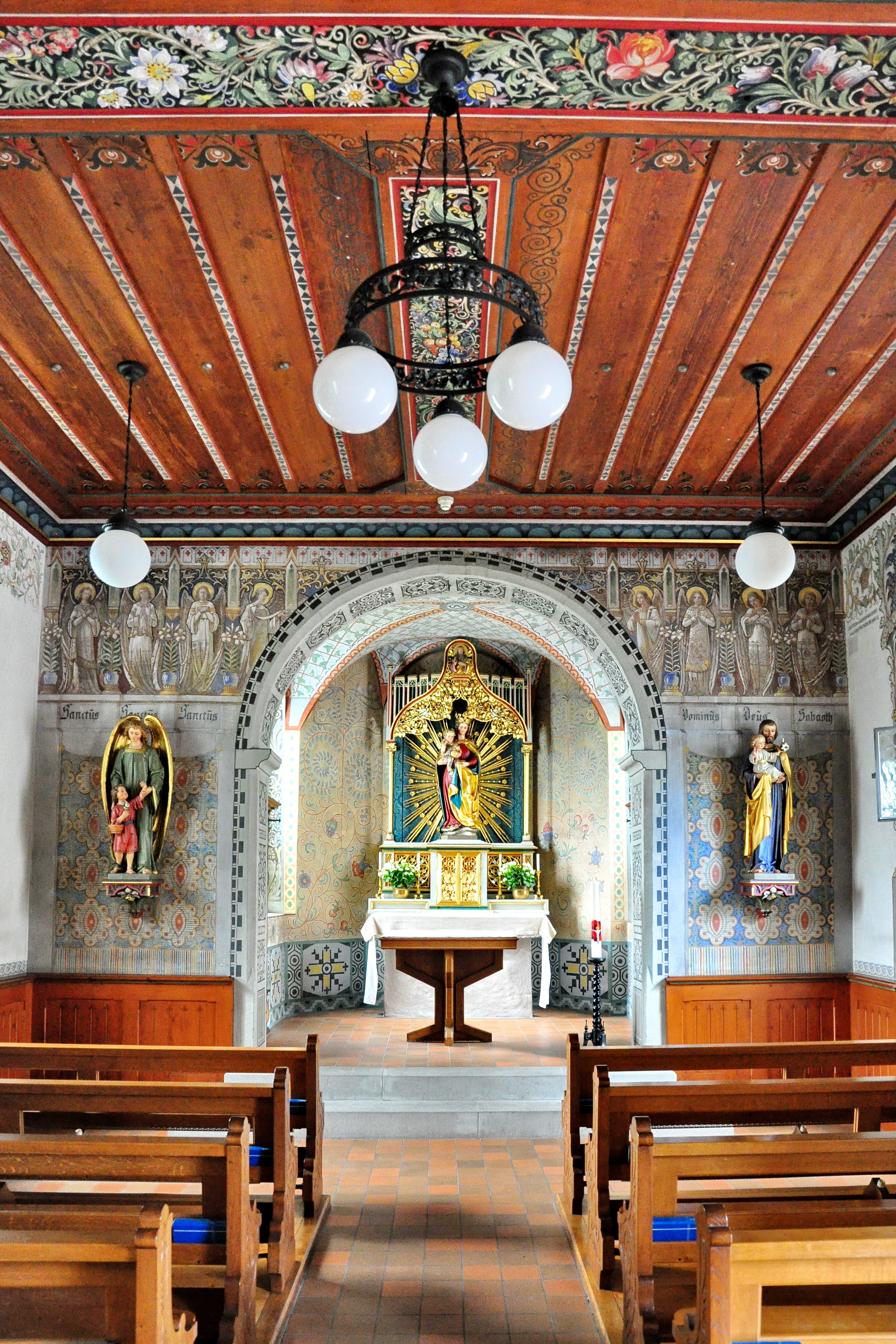
Liebfrauenkapelle

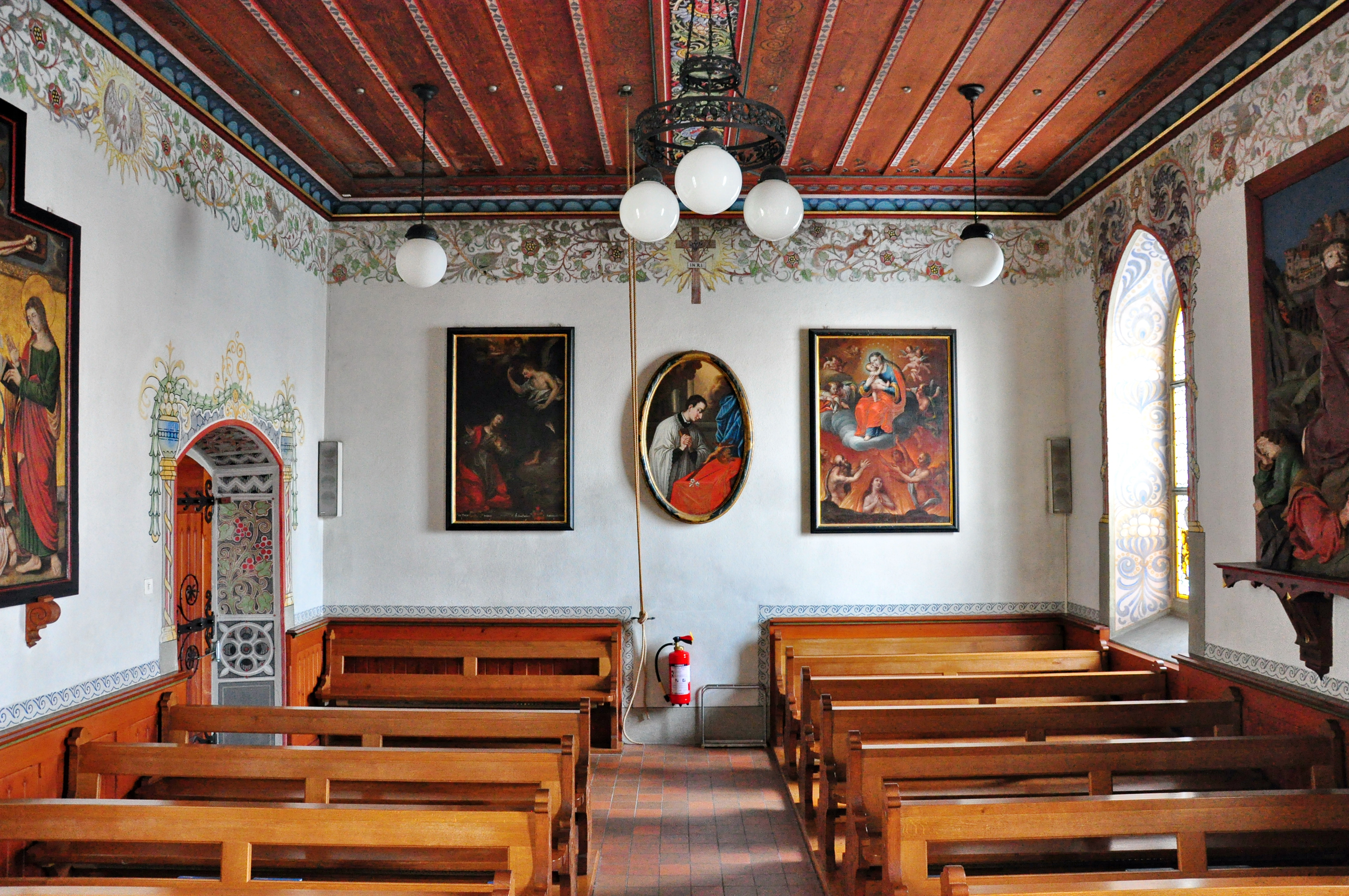
Mixed Gothic and Art Nouveau interior decorations towards the peal of bells in the west

The chapel stands on an approximately 4 metres (13 ft) high base – that in fact are the foundation walls of the ossuary – as a rectangular single naved church. It measures about 8 metres (26 ft) x 12 metres (39 ft), with an eaves height of about 8 metres (26 ft), having an east-facing apse, a small ridge turret with a single bell and a steep gable roof. The late Gothic stone building was built in 1489. The consecration to the Virgin Mary took place on 20 June 1493. The altar was ordained to Mary, the apostles Peter and Paul, Sebastian, Christophorus, Anna and All Saints.

On its eastern side, a five-sided closed choir was added in 1675. Two ogival north-facing windows and one south-facing window illuminate the nave, two arched windows illuminate the choir. The interior is decorated with neo-Gothic furniture and, on occasion of the extensive renovation works in 1917, with Art Nouveau paintings.

In 1875, just before the adjacent parish church burned down, the sloping terrain had to be refilled for an extension of the cemetery. For this reason, a staircase to the lower part of the churchyard was built on the west side, and the access to the ossuary was made now one level higher than before. After the fire of 1882 some of the epitaphs of the parish church were attached to the outside wall of the chapel. The former ossuary was converted into a storage facility for the funeral service in 1964. The outside decoration of the chapel was renewed in 1978/79. On occasion of the exterior renovation, the grave stones, except one at the entrance, were removed and two epitaphs moved into the former ossuary in the basement of the chapel.

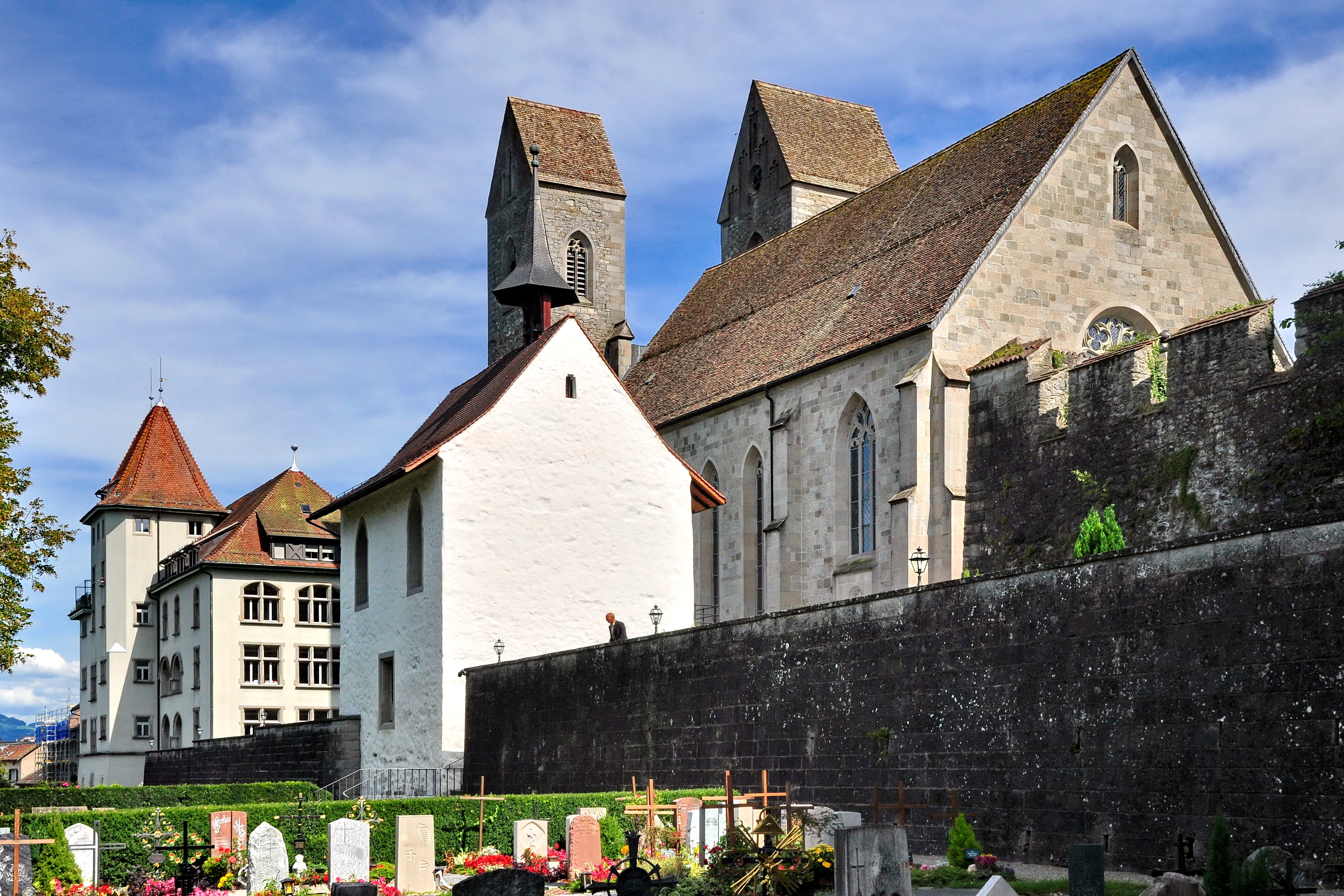
Liebfrauenkapelle, the parish church and the cemetery

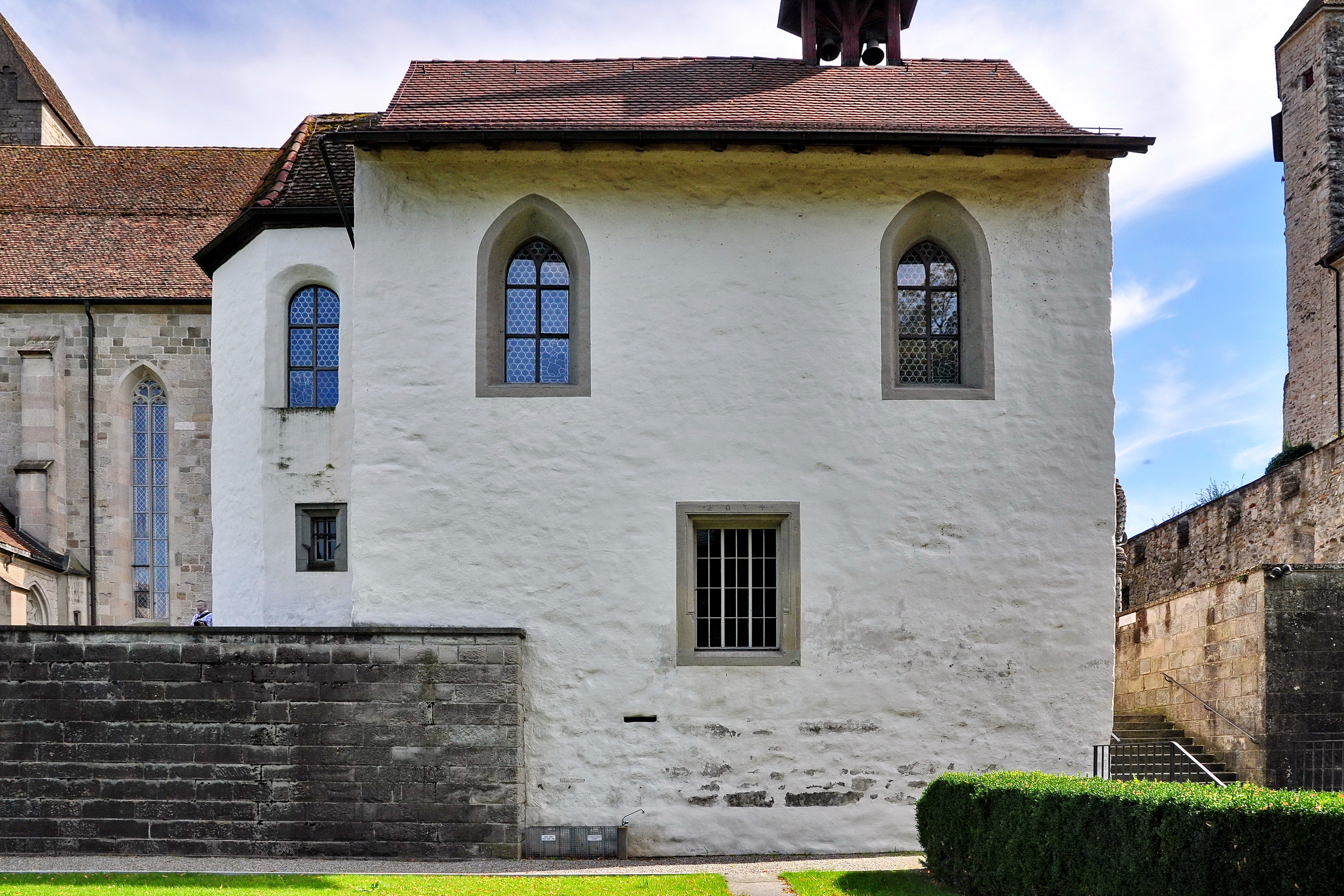
Former ossuary and the chapel above

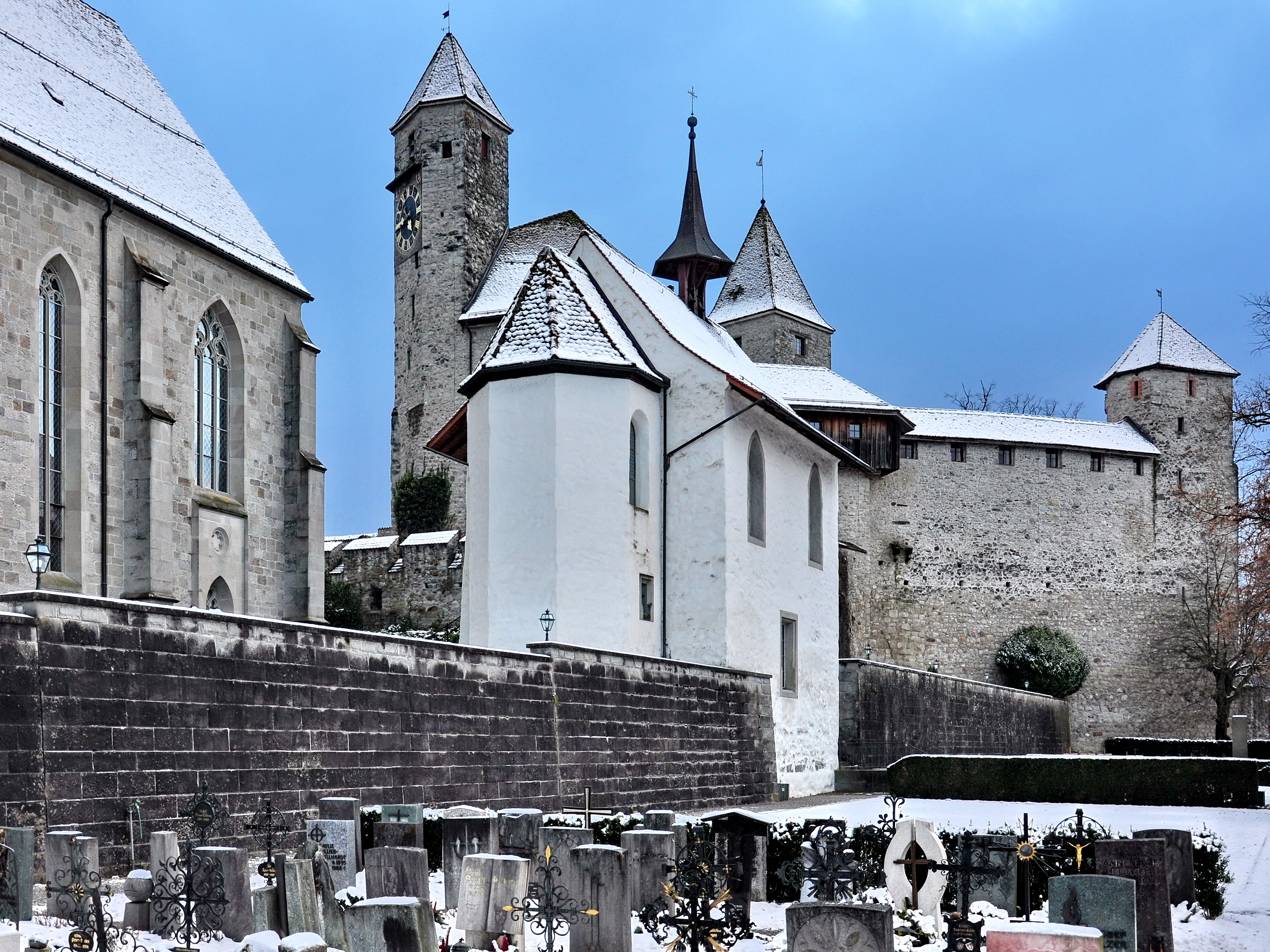
Chapel-church-castle "trio" as seen from the east

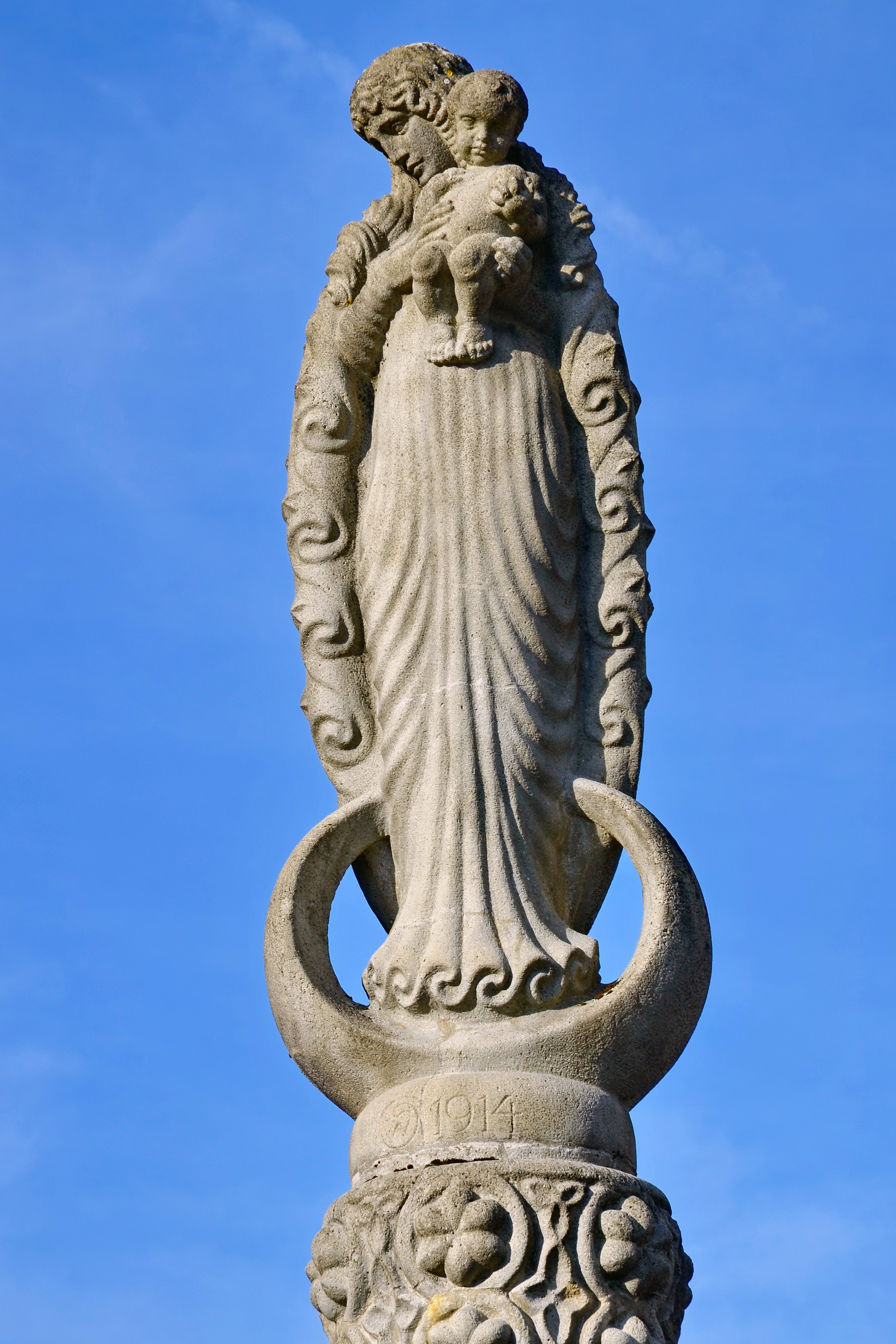
Mariensäule

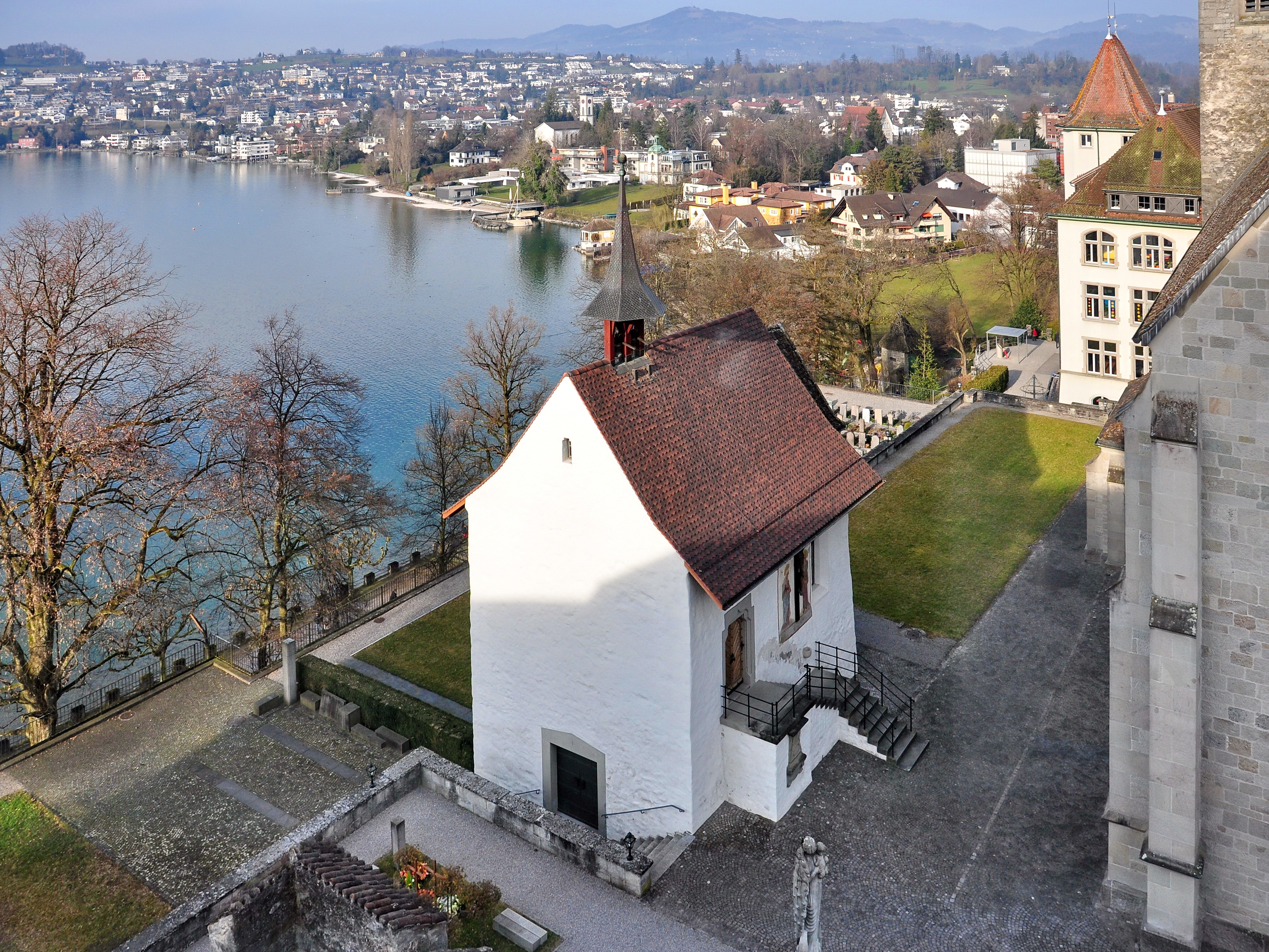
As seen from the Rapperswil Castle's donjon, Zürichsee and Kempraten in the background

The crucifixion scene at the staircase on the south side was created in the 17th century when Maria and Magdalena were painted on plaster on either side of a wooden crucifix. On the cross hung a corpus from the period around 1490, part of the late Gothic decoration of the neighbouring parish church where it found a place in its choir in 1979.

The small church is used as the cemetery chapel of the Roman Catholic city cemetery and is popular for weddings.

== Interior ==
In 1916/17 the interior with the small choir was redesigned fundamentally as the then designers sought a "stylistic unification" with the parish church that had to be renewed in 1885. The original plaster ceiling was replaced by a wooden ceiling according to the Gothic style, as well as the seating and the vault of the choir. Jean Rotenfluh, a native of Rapperswil, carried out the decorations, only the decorative painting, as the angel in the choir arch, have Art Nouveau elements. The semicircular chancel arch is decorated on its side walls with the figure of a guardian angel with child and a statue of Joseph with the infant Jesus. The originally Baroque altar stands today in the Saint Pancras church in Bollingen; it was replaced by a neo-gothic altarpiece whose center is a lovely statue of Our Lady. Due to the liturgical reform in 1979, a simple altar table was added. The original Gothic windows were widened, and the interior designed for the purposes of historicism. Inside the church, the wall paintings from the 17th century were unfortunately removed, and the walls decorated with oil paintings from the late Gothic and the Baroque periods with religious motifs: The wooden relief with Christ on the Mount of Olives by an unknown woodcarver originates around 1530, just as the late-Gothic Crucifixion panel. One painting on the back wall dates from the Baroque and presents Mary as intercessor for the poor souls, the oval image of Aloysius Gonzaga may be a work by the Rapperswil artist Elisa (Louise) Fornaro (1726–1796).

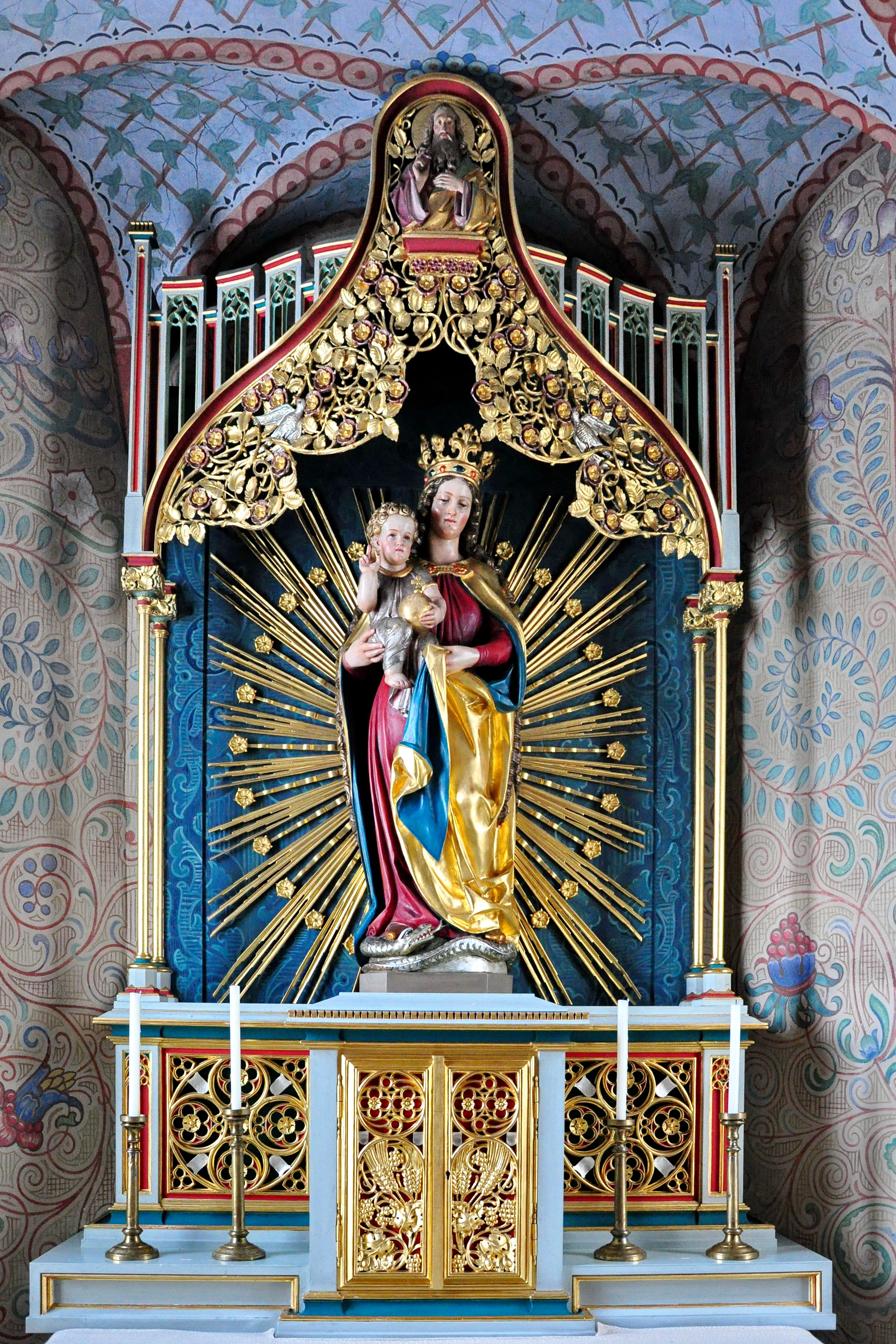
Altar

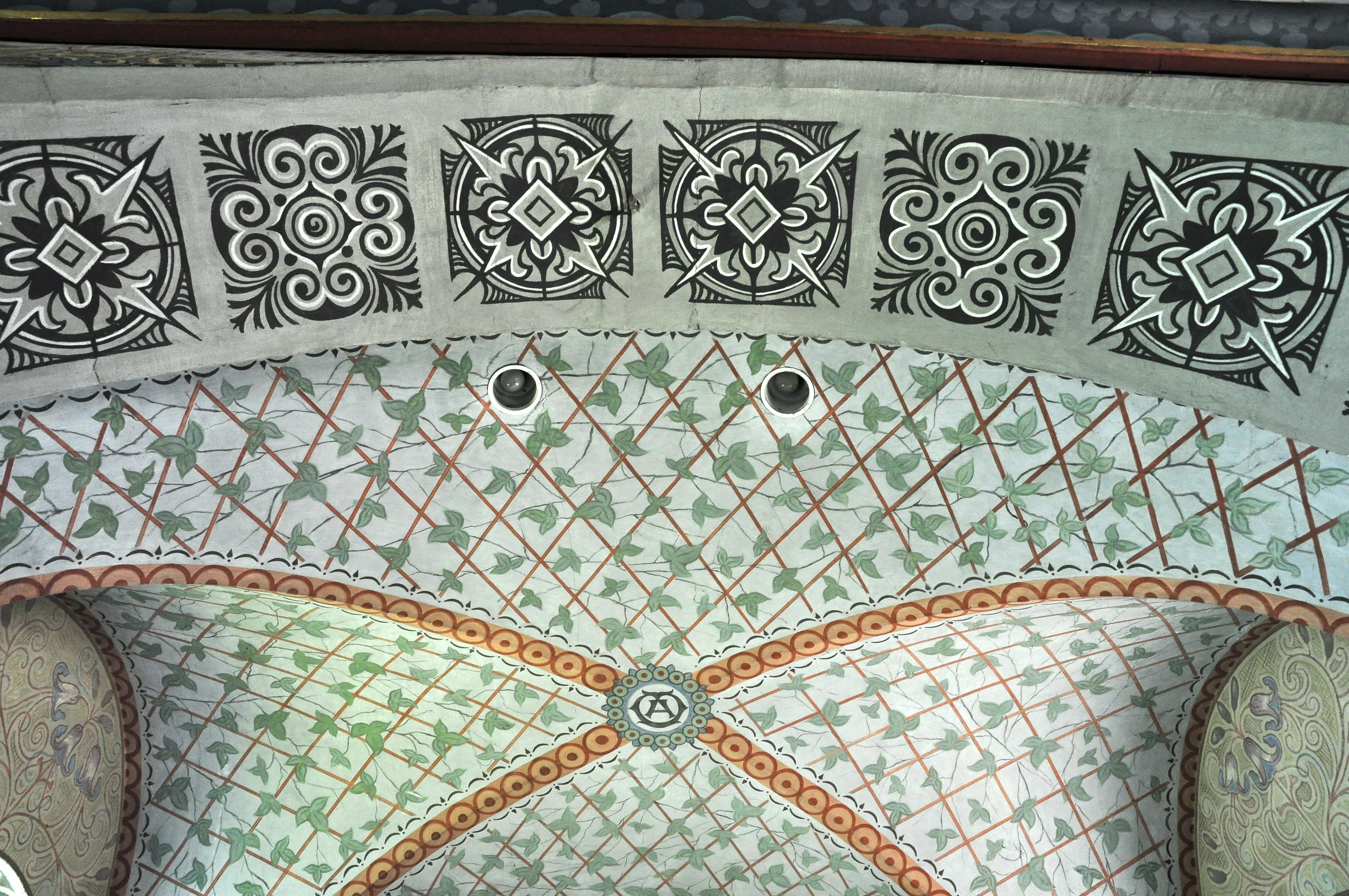
Vault in the choir

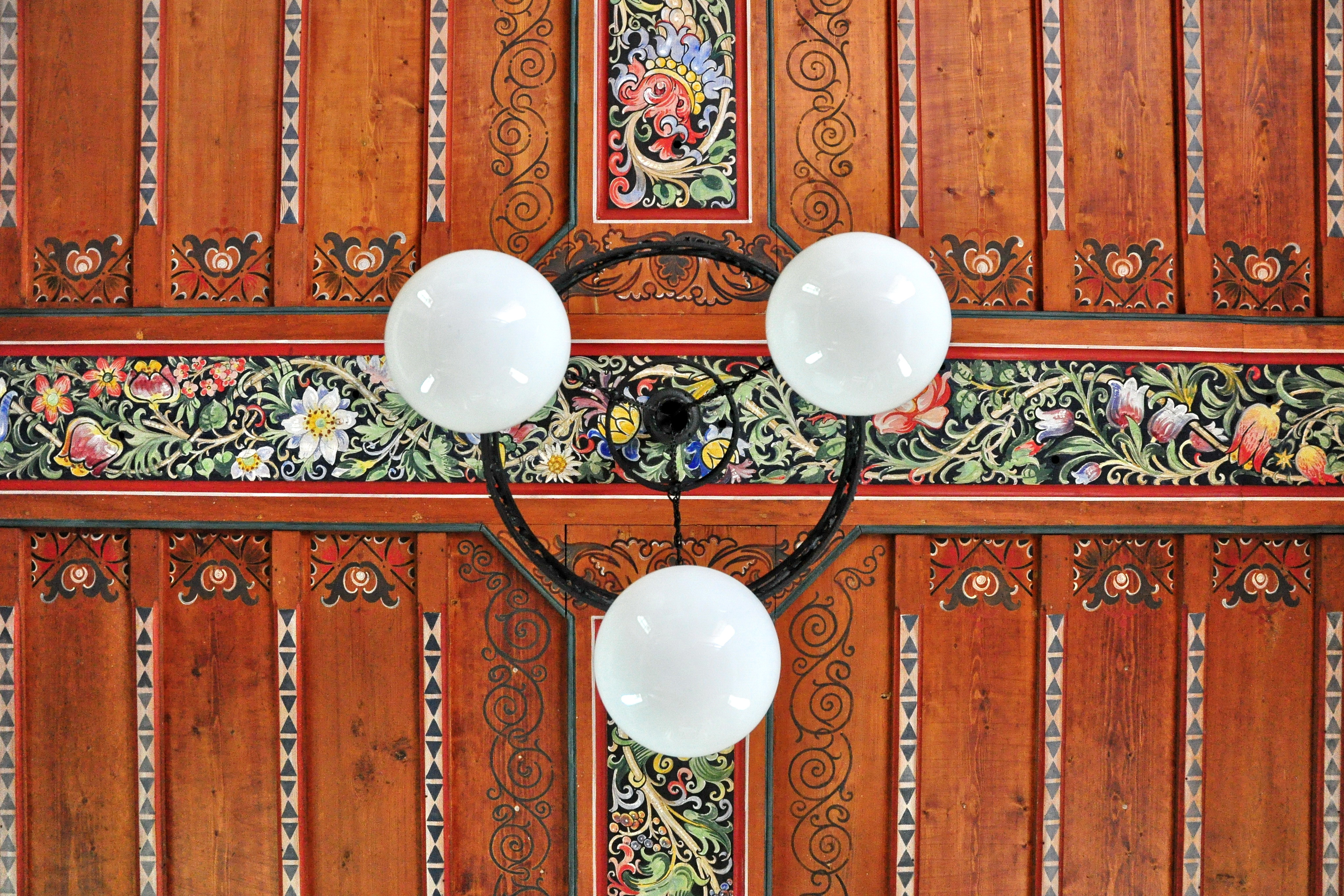
Church ceiling

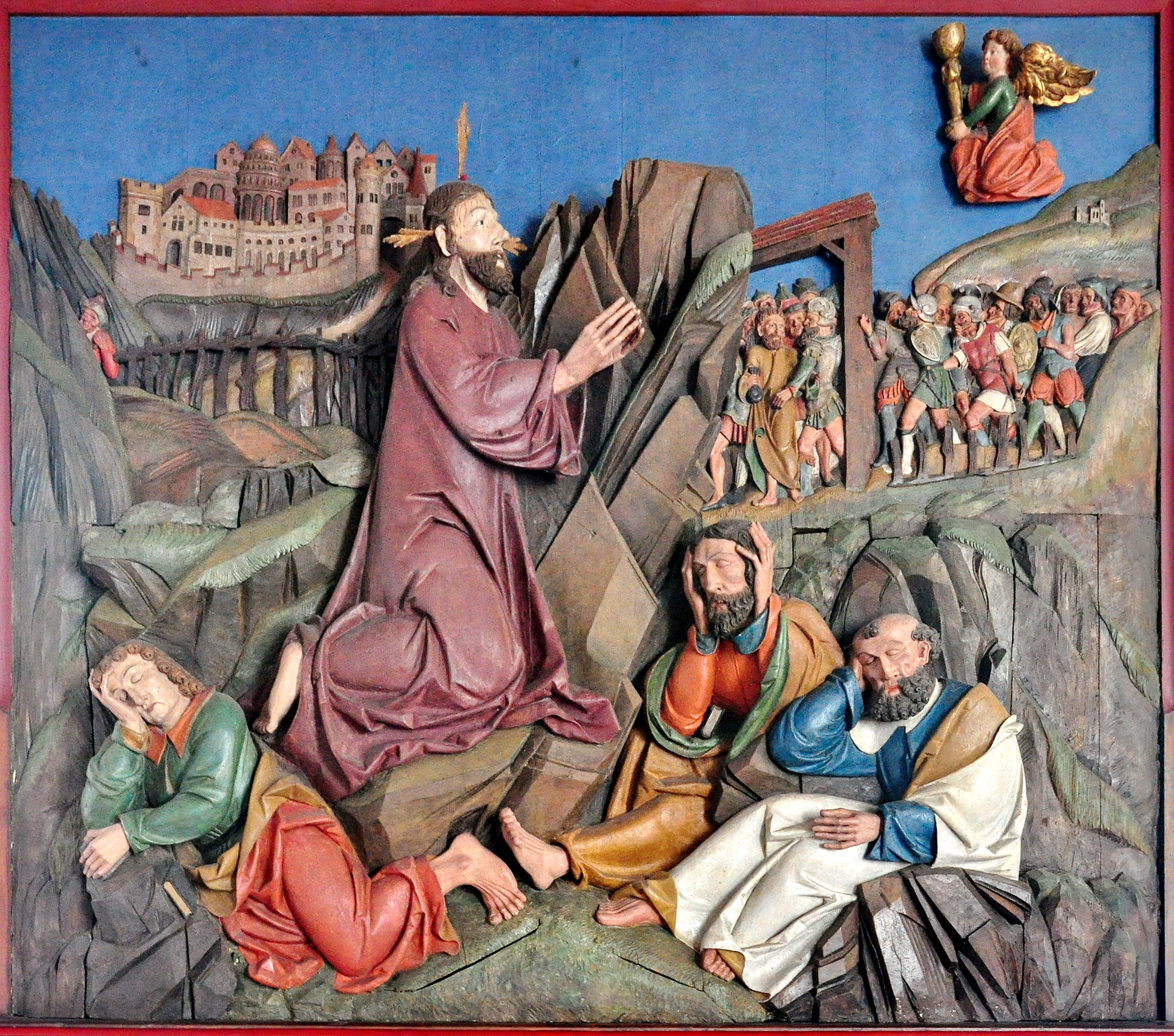
Wood relief of 1530

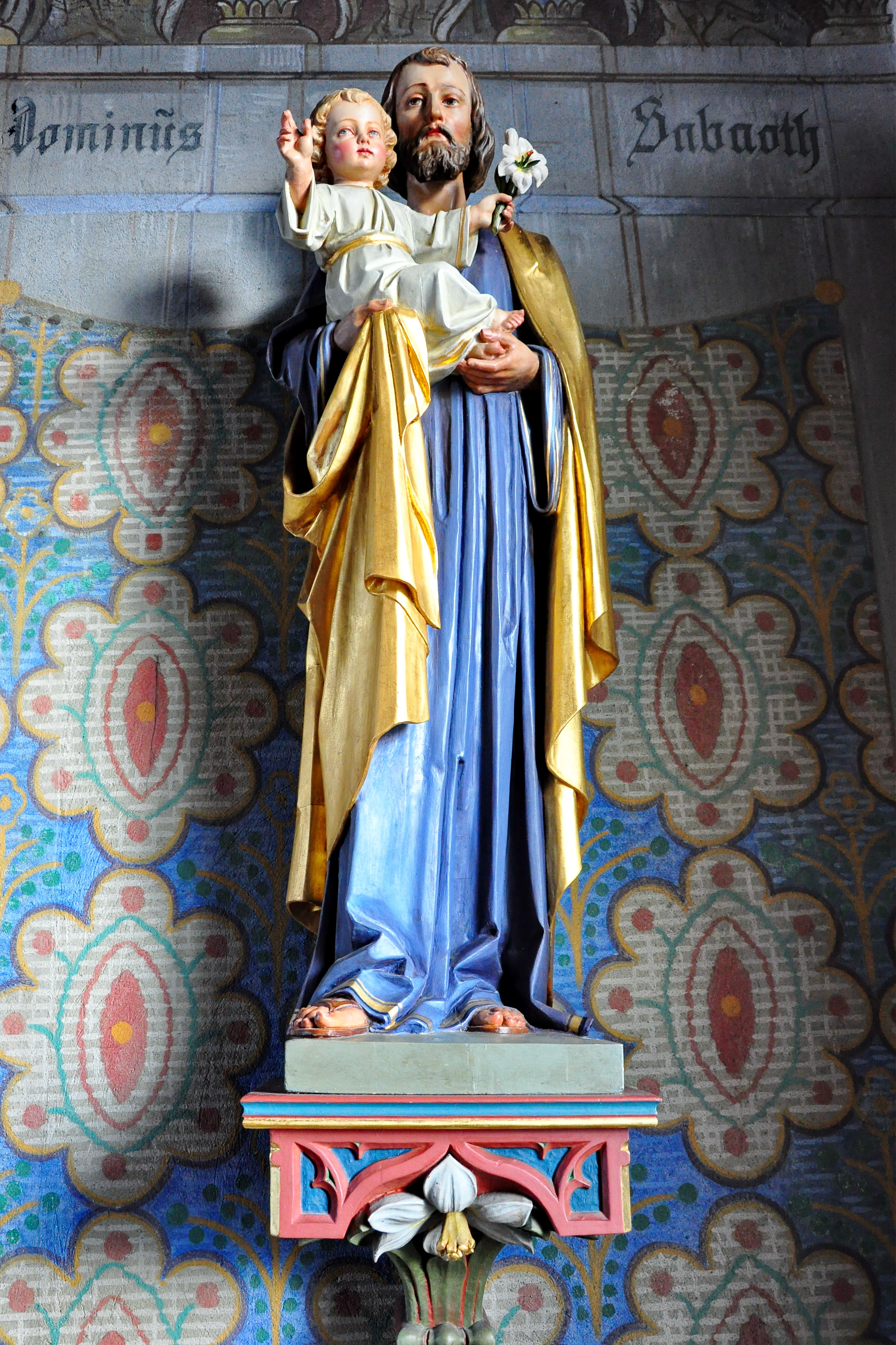
Joseph and the infant Child

== Mariensäule ==
Mariensäule (literally Maria column) is situated between the castle's exterior walls, the parish church and Liebfrauenkapelle and was moved from Bern to its present location in 1914.

== Cultural heritage ==
The Stadtpfarrkirche Rapperswil and the chapel are listed in the Swiss inventory of cultural property of national and regional significance as Class B objects of regional importance.

== Literature ==
- Peter Röllin: Kulturbaukasten Rapperswil-Jona. Rapperswil-Jona 2005. ISBN 3-033-00478-4
- Die Liebfrauenkapelle beim Stadtfriedhof Rapperswil. Brochure published by Katholische Kirchgemeinde Rapperswil-Jona.
