= Busskirch =

Village in St. Gallen, Switzerland

Coordinates: 47°14′N 8°50′E

Busskirch is a village (Kirchdorf) within the municipality of Rapperswil-Jona in the canton of St. Gallen, Switzerland.

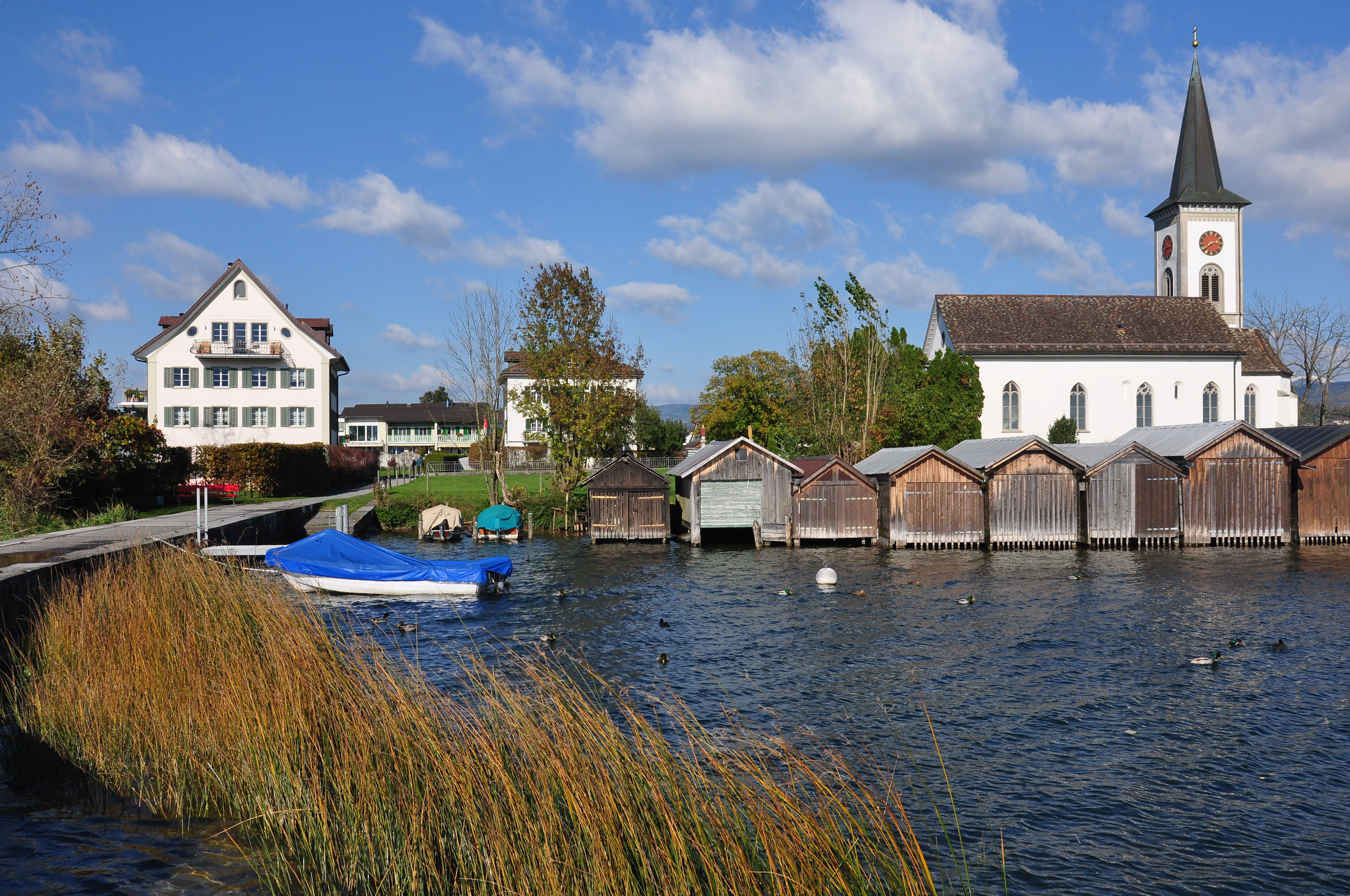
St. Martin Busskirch on upper lake shore.

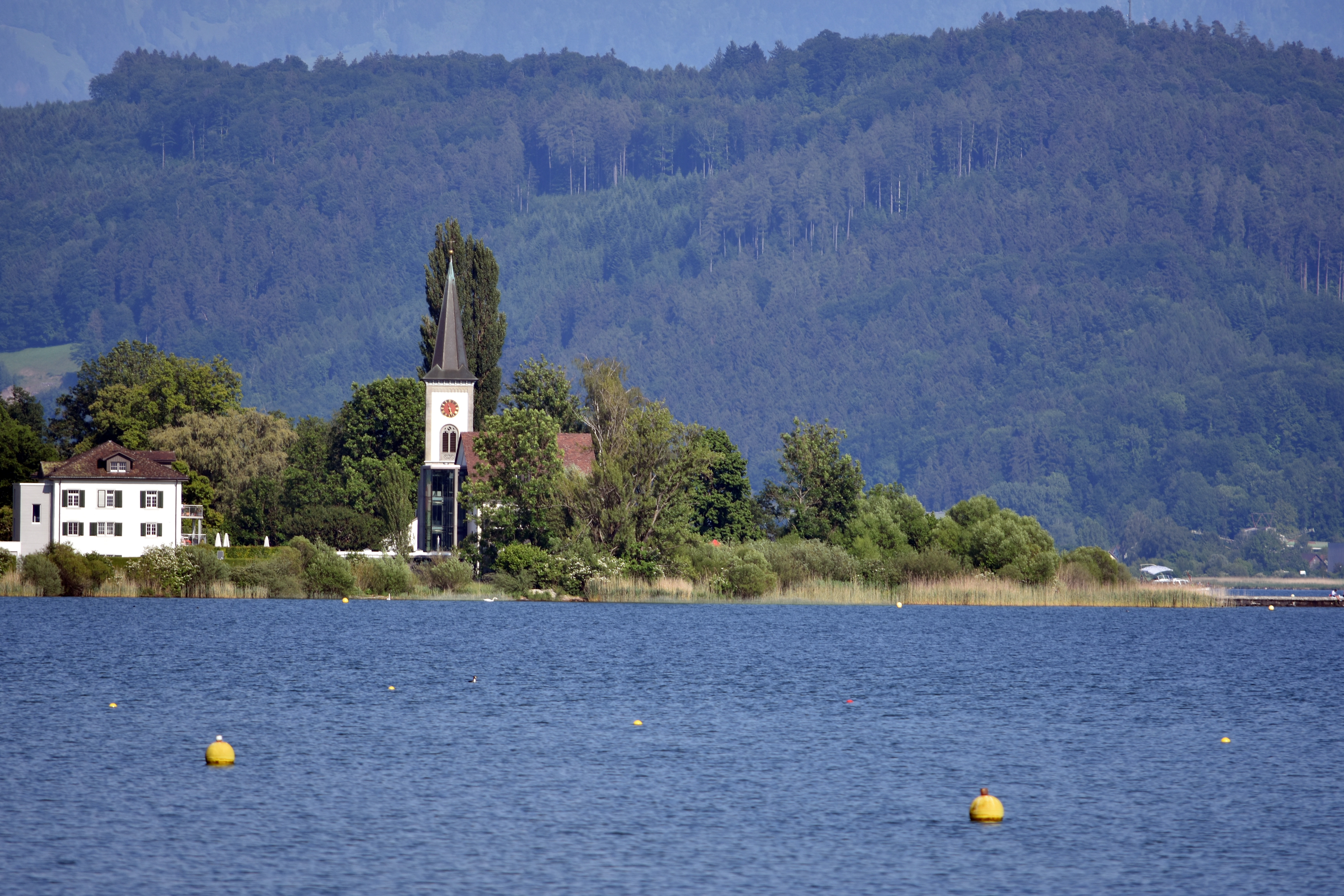
Busskirch as seen from Holzbrücke Rapperswil-Hurden at Seedamm in Rapperswil, Buechberg in the background.

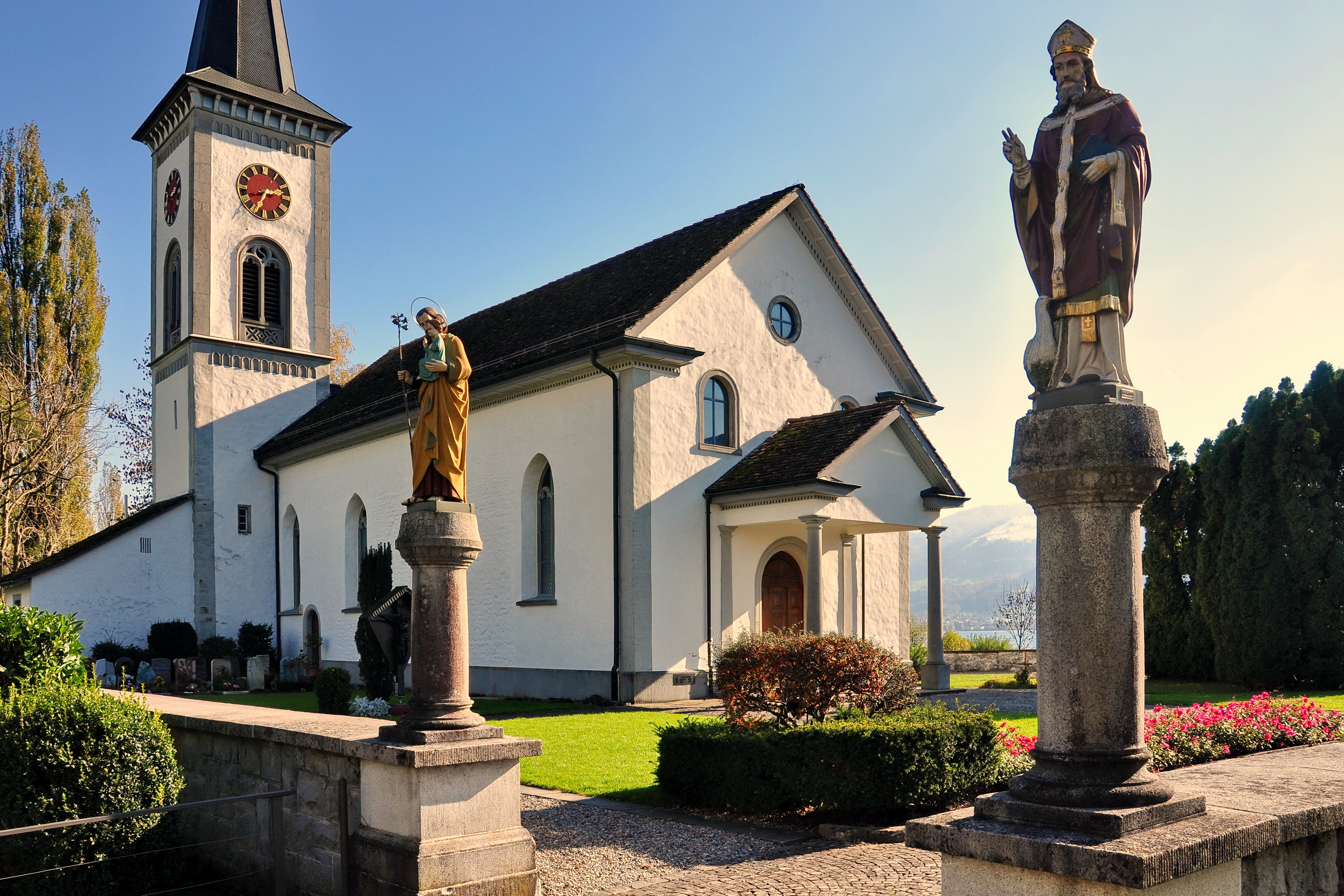
St. Martin Church

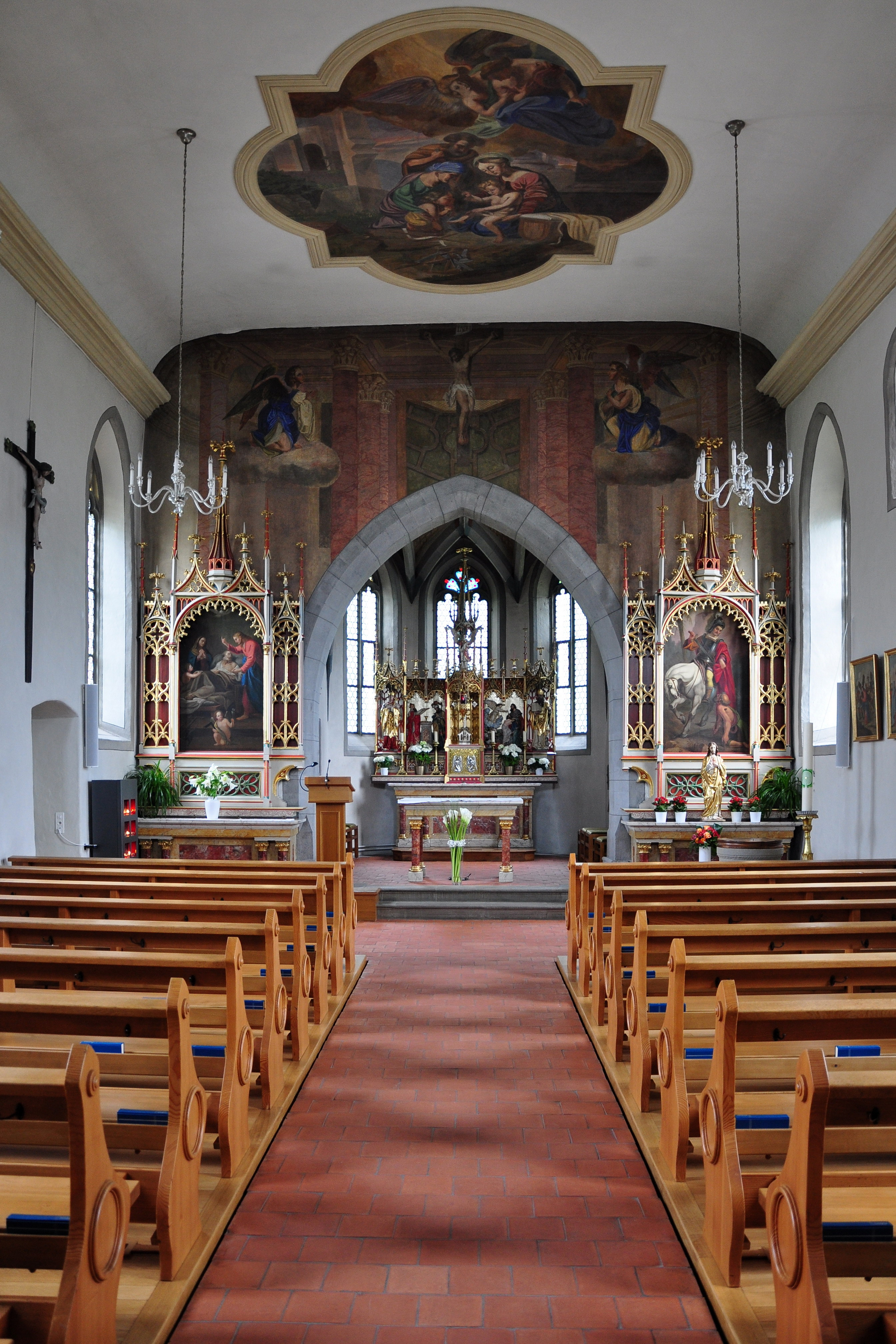

== Geography ==
The village is located along the northern shore of the Obersee lakeshore between Jona and Bollingen. Busskirch was part of the former municipality of Jona: On January 1, 2007, the former municipalities of Rapperswil and Jona merged to form the new political entity Rapperswil-Jona.

== History ==
=== Roman era ===
Beginning in the 1st century A.D., Busskirch was a Roman lakeside settlement that served as a stage town on the intersection of the streets to Kempraten (Latin: Centum Prata) respectively Zürich (Turicum), Winterthur (Vitudurum) and to Chur (Curia Rhaetorum) respectively on the waterway Walensee–Zürichsee to Rome's alpine route.

=== St. Martin Busskirch church ===
Busskirch is first mentioned in 842/843 A.D. as Fossonas ecclesiam, in 854 as Fussinchirichun and in 1209 as Buschilche. «A little church dreaming on the lake» wrote Pius Rickenmann, a poet from Rapperswil, in his poem Busskirch. The early medieval Parish church of St. Martin Busskirch with its cemetery rests on the remains of a Roman building (1st to 4th century A.D.). Beginning in the 8th century, the village belonged to the Pfäfers Abbey. Busskirch is one of the oldest churches around the Lake Zürich. Even the citizens of Rapperswil had to attend services in Busskirch until Count Rudolf II of Rapperswil built his own church and a chapel next to Rapperswil Castle in 1253. In 1351 St. Martin Busskirch was incorporated by the monastery (until 1838). In co-operation with Jona the settlement formed an Allmendgenossenschaft (farmer's association), reigned by the Counts of Rapperswil, latter by the city of Rapperswil. In 1253 the parish churches of Rapperswil (St. John's Church) and Jona were established: St. Martin Busskirch lost its former importance and was in 1945 integrated in the Roman Catholic parish Rapperswil.

== Points of interest ==
St. Martin Busskirch Church, which due to its idyllic lakeside location is very popular for weddings, is a remarkable landmark on the upper Lake Zürich shore. Today visitors can see the Roman ruins excavated in 1975 underneath Busskirch church. Restaurant Seegartenkeller next to St. Martin church is a popular touristic destination. Jona (river) forms a small river delta near Busskirch and flows at Stampf lido in the upper Lake Zurich (Obersee).

== Transportation ==
Between Busskirch and Rapperswil respectively Jona there is a busline, provided by Verkehrsbetriebe Zürcher Oberland.

== Literature ==
- Eugen Halter: Geschichte der Gemeinde Jona. Schweizer Verlagshaus, Zürich 1970.
