= Carl Greith =

Swiss composer (1828–1887)

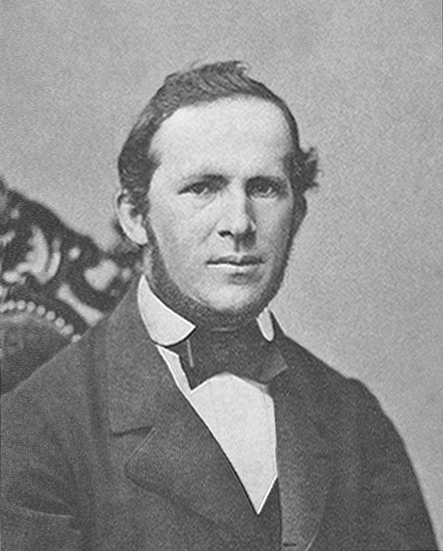
- Born: 21 February 1828; Aarau, Switzerland
- Died: 17 November 1887 (aged 59)
- Occupations: composer musician
- Spouse: Klara Greith

Carl Greith, also Karl Greith (21 February 1828 – 17 November 1887), was a Swiss composer and church musician.

== Life ==
Emil Franz Carl Greith came into the world on 21 February 1828 in Aarau, Switzerland, as the oldest son among the six children of the Swiss composer and music educator Franz Josef Greith (1799-1869). Carl was described as a musically highly gifted child, who followed in his father's footsteps and often took his place in church as a musician. After completing a classical education with distinction at the Gymnasium level he was a capable Latinist, an ability that was invaluable to him later as a church composer.

Because of his outstanding drive and musical gift, his father Greith and his oldest sister Rosa (1826-1913), who at the time was active as a piano teacher in St. Gallen, made possible his music study in Munich. In the autumn of 1845 he traveled to the cathedral city with his father, who had chosen for him the best teachers of their field in what was then the center of Catholic church music, Caspar Ett (1788–1847), who revived classic church music (for the study of harmony and counterpoint) and the respected organ master Johann Georg Herzog (1822–1909). From 1845 to 1947 Carl Greith received a basic musical training in the subjects of harmony, composition, violin, flute, piano, and organ. His first compositions emerged in the second year of his studies: a festal overture for the bishop's feast in St. Gallen, and as part of his duties for the canton school, a set of 32 songs for use in Catholic services (1846–47). After his training in Munich he completed his study of composition in Augsburg under the wing of Karl Ludwig Drobisch (1803–1854).

In the autumn 1847 Greith returned to St. Gallen, where he became director of the Antlitzgesellschaft and singing teacher, who took on the theoretical and practical advancement of music and the duties related to that in the higher-level schools. In connection with the end-of-year musical celebration of the Kantonschule St. Gallen, his oratorio "Der heilige Gallus" ("Saint Gall") was premiered on 25 August 1848. Repeat performances followed in early 1849 in Winterthur and Zürich. Greith was praised by, among others, the Swiss composer Xaver Schnyder von Wartensee (1786–1868) who wrote: "The composition of this twenty-year-old is natural, clear, effortless, the instrumentation is excellent and perfectly clean. The composer has spirit and courage, head and heart; he will shine as a brilliant star in the firmament of composition." After several choral Masses and string quartets the melodramas Frauenherz and Die Waise aus Genf followed in Basel and St. Gallen. He also met Richard Wagner (1813–1883) at the time, at first attracted but later feeling alienated from him.

In 1854 Carl Greith moved to Frankfurt am Main where he worked as a highly valued music instructor and composed a symphony, among other works. In 1856 he was called to be music director at Feldkirch, but in 1857 he returned to Switzerland and took up a post as professor and choral director in the municipality of Schwyz. After his father's retirement he stepped in as his successor as choral director and organist at the St. Gallen Cathedral. His aspirations for reforms were received only reluctantly in the conservative Catholic environment. For ten years he battled with countless difficulties, but overcame them thanks to his unbending will.

Happily married, he moved back to Munich in 1872 with his musically educated wife Klara, a woman of refined sensibilities, where after several successful performances of his compositions he was active as cathedral Kapellmeister at the Frauenkirche. He devoted tireless energy to the orchestra there, not least in order to present performances of his own works as a composer. A close friendship connected him with the reformer of Catholic church music Franz Xaver Witt (1834–1888). Greith's efforts, though, were hardly noticed by the cathedral chapter there, dominated by the Cecilian movement, and he withdrew ever more from public life. Out of resentment he even refused to include his name at many performances of his works. On 17 November 1887 he suffered a stroke and died. He was buried at the old southern cemetery at the Sendling Gate in Munich, where his grave remains. In a commemoration, Munich honored him as an equal to his now better known contemporaries Joseph Rheinberger (1839–1901) and Franz Lachner (1803–1890).

== Biographical Sources ==
- Regula Puskás: "Greith, Karl" in German, French and Italian in the online Historical Dictionary of Switzerland., 2006
- Hans Peter Schanzlin (1966). "Greith, Karl". Neue Deutsche Biographie (in German). Vol. 7. Berlin: Duncker & Humblot. pp. 42–43. (full text online).
- Hyacinth Holland (1904). "Greith, Karl" . Allgemeine Deutsche Biographie (in German). Vol. 49. Leipzig: Duncker & Humblot. pp. 537–539.
- Karl Jakob Eisenring: Carl Greith, der grösste schweizerische Kirchenmusiker. Ein Lebens- & Charakterbild des weiland Domkapellmeisters von St. Gallen und von München, nebst fünf Proben von Karl Greith's musikliterarischer Thätigkeit. Verlag der Erziehungsanstalt Paradies, Ingenbohl 1900
- Alfred Disch: Franz Josef Greith von Rapperswil (1799–1869), hrsg. von der Ortsgemeinde Rapperswil, 1982
- Emanuel Schwarz: Der Komponist Carl Greith, Beilageheft Oratorium „Der heilige Gallus“, hrsg. vom Collegium Musicum St. Gallen, 1998
- Beilageheft Oratorium „Judith“, hrsg. vom Collegium Musicum St. Gallen, 2001
- Beilageheft Oratorium „Der heilige Gallus“, hrsg. von Musiques Suisse (MGB), 2003
