= Einsiedlerhaus =

- Einsiedlerhaus (German)
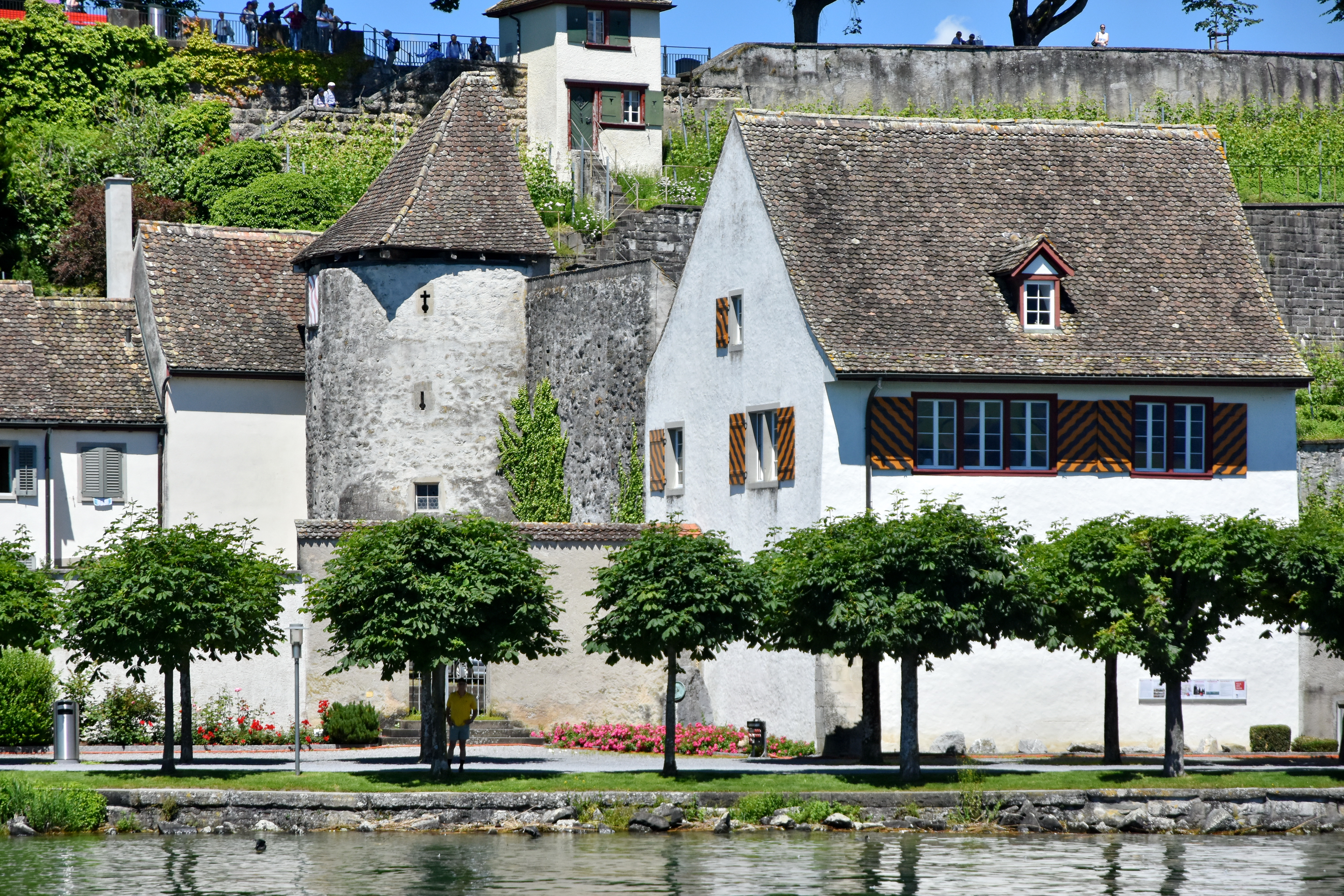
- Lakeshore at the Kapuzinerkloster and Endingen in Rapperswil: Einsiedlerhaus and Endingerturm gate, Lindenhof hill and the Rapperswil Castle in the background, as seen from Zürichsee-Schifffahrtsgesellschaft (ZSG) ship MS Helvetia on Zürichsee.
- Interactive map of Einsiedlerhaus
- 47°13′36″N 8°48′17″E
- Location: Endingerstrasse 7, 8640 Rapperswil

History
- Built: probably first mentioned 981 AD

Site notes
- Architectural style: European Medieval
- Governing body: Einsiedeln Abbey

Einsiedlerhaus ("Hermit's dwell") is a historic building with an adjoint garden which is part of the former town wall of the medieval Swiss town of Rapperswil in the Canton of St. Gallen.

== Location ==
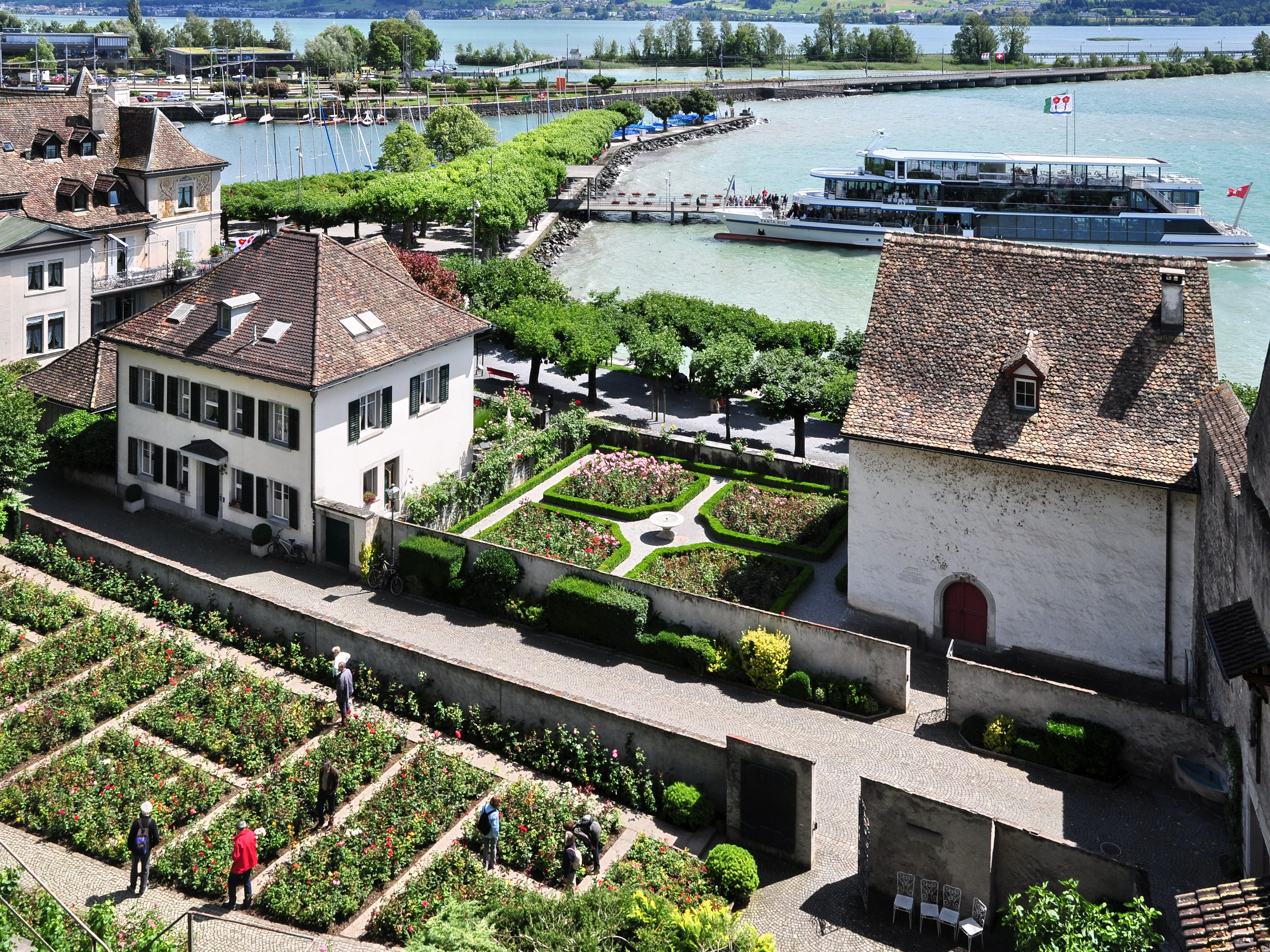
Altstadt and harbour, Einsiedlerhaus and the rose garden, and in the background, the wooden bridge (Holzbrücke) on Obersee and the Seedamm isthmus, as seen from the Lindenhof hill towards the castle (Schloss).

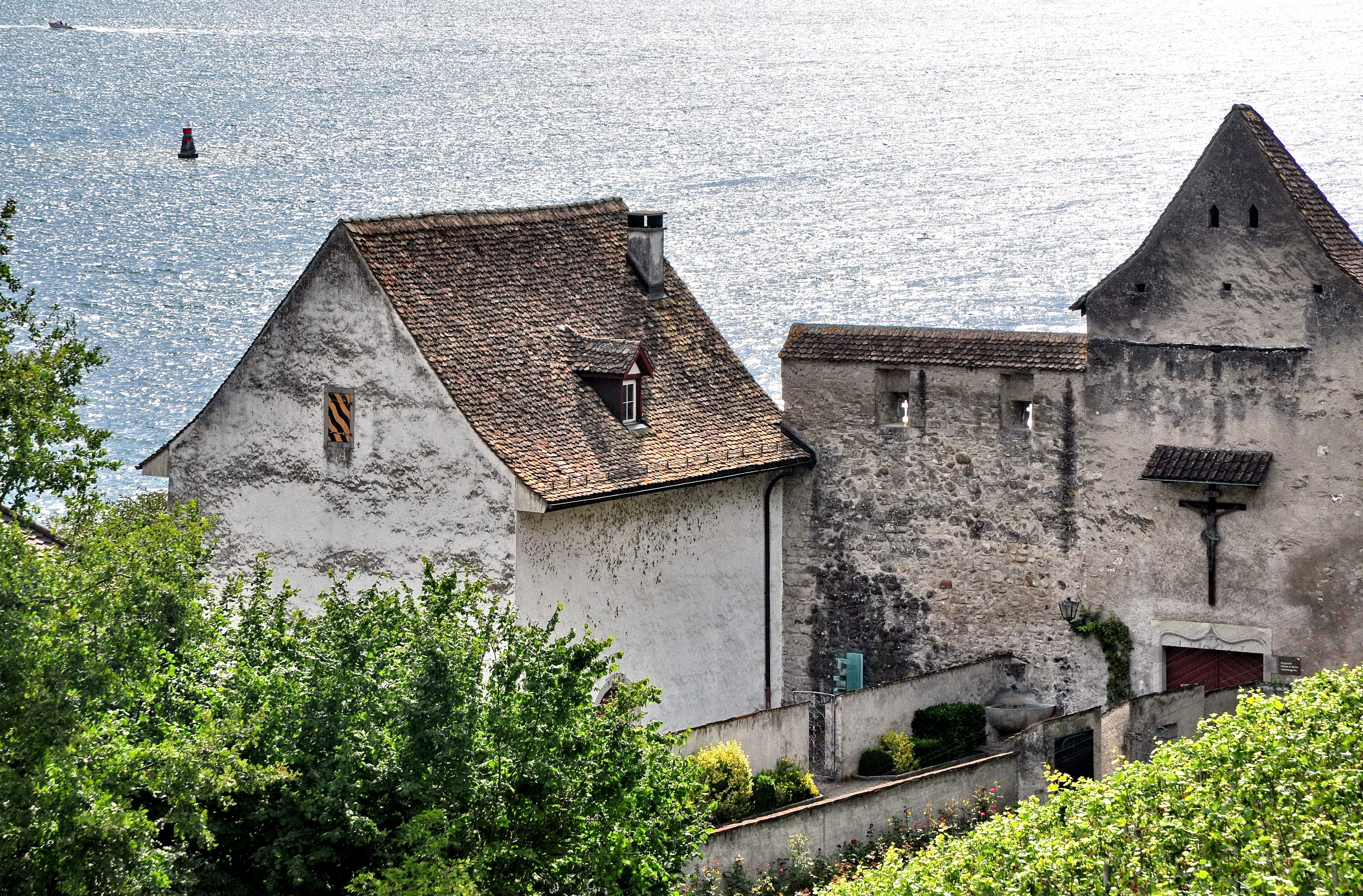
The building complex as seen from the Lindenhof plateau.

Situated on the shore of Zürichsee lake, Einsiedlerhaus is the eastern extension of the fortification of a neighbouring Capuchin friary (German: Kapuzinerkloster) in the so-called Endingen area, located below the Lindenhof hill. The building is separated from the monastery by a tower gate named Endingertor, and also houses one of the rose gardens in Rapperswil.

== History ==
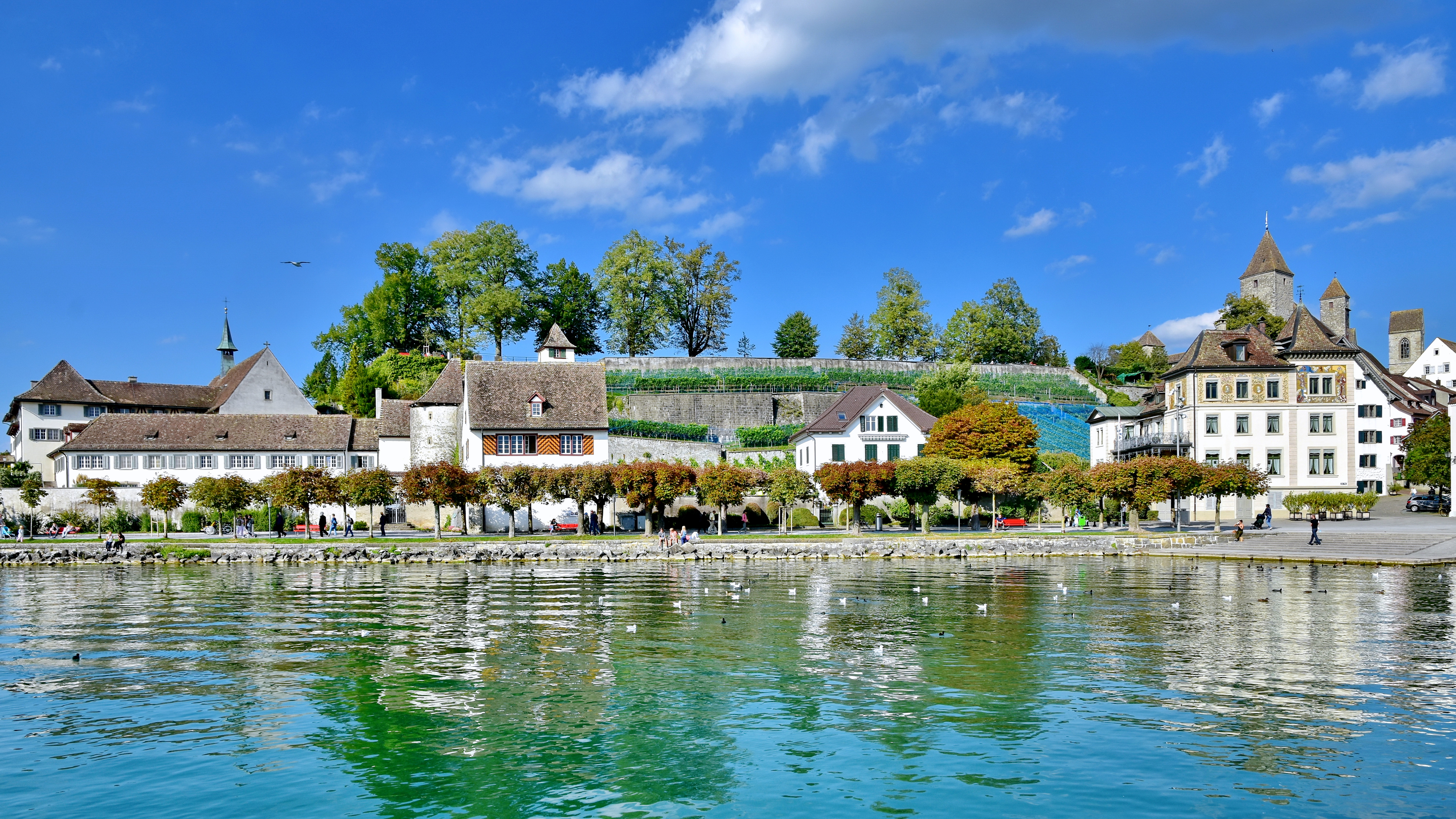
Endingen respectively present Bühler-Allee in Rapperswil: Lindenhof hill and the castle (Schloss), and on lakeshore the Kupuzinerkloster and the Endingenhorn fortification, Endingertor gate and Einsiedlerhaus, and Curti buildings to the right, as seen from Zürichsee-Schifffahrtsgesellschaft (ZSG) ship MS Helvetia

The building was probably built in the 13th century, or maybe two centuries earlier. The Zürichsee lakeshore area of Endingen was given by the Einsiedeln Abbey to the Counts of Rapperswil as a fief—the abbey is still owner of the land, including the area where the 16th-century Capuchin friary was built. That's why the building traditionally was named Einsiedlerhaus, meaning "house of the Einsiedeln abbey". Historians mention a 10th-century ferry station located there – in 981 AD as well as the vineyard on the Lindenhof hill – between Kempraten on Kempratnerbucht, Lützelau and Ufenau islands and presumably present Hurden, which allowed the pilgrims towards Einsiedeln to cross the lake before the prehistoric lake crossing at the Seedamm isthmus was re-built between 1358 and 1360. Endingen was also the location of the former locus Endingen, meaning a small fishing village before the town of Rapperswil was established between 1200 and 1220. That's why some historians conclude that the Einsiedlerhaus may be the oldest stone building in present Rapperswil. The western lakeshore town wall respectively fortifications of Rapperswil probably were built in the early 13th century by Rudolf II von Rapperswil. With the rise of the town, the monastic governor in Pfäffikon used the building as storage of goods that were sold at the Rapperswil market.

When the monastery was built, the fortification was extended from 1603 to the western tip of the peninsula, and the Einsiedlerhaus since then is situated within the city walls. Nevertheless, the fortress section with the adjoining semi-circular tower Endingerturm, since 1597 with the passage in the present-day Capuchin monastery garden, is the most historically significant remain of the former city fortifications.

With the consecration of the Capuchin monastery in 1610, the building was given by the Einsiedeln abbott Augustin Hofmann to the Capuchin monastery. Since 1660 or 1669 the Capuchin friars were allowed to use the building as a wool mill, from March 1670 to summer 1693 as a walk-mill that produced 16 quintals wool a year. In 1718 the operation as mill went over to the town of Rapperswil, which the products exported to Southern Germany. In 1895 the weaving was mechanized and in 1914 electrified. As the Capuchin friar Christian Endres, the last woolen cloth weaver in the Rapperswil monastery, died in 1971, the monastic tradition extinct after exactly 300 years. The adjoint garden was used by the Capuchins as an orchard until 1972, when the garden went over to the city of Rapperswil.

In compensation, an agreement dated 6 February 1975 between the Einsiedeln Abbey (owner), the city of Rapperswil (leaser) and the Capuchin monastery (former leaser), certifies that Rapperswil solemnly replaces the Capuchin's fruit loss in natura – every autumn a fruit farmer from neighbouring the Feldbach village delivers 50 kilograms (110 lb) apples, with the consent of the Benedictine monastery Einsiedeln as owner of the building, for which the Capuchins have to deliver a symbolic annual loan of one Swiss Franc. Since 2012 the building houses a youth music school; a contract was concluded between Rapperswil, the Einsiedeln abbey and the association proMusicante to lease the building for 25 years.

== Architecture ==
=== Einsiedlerhaus ===
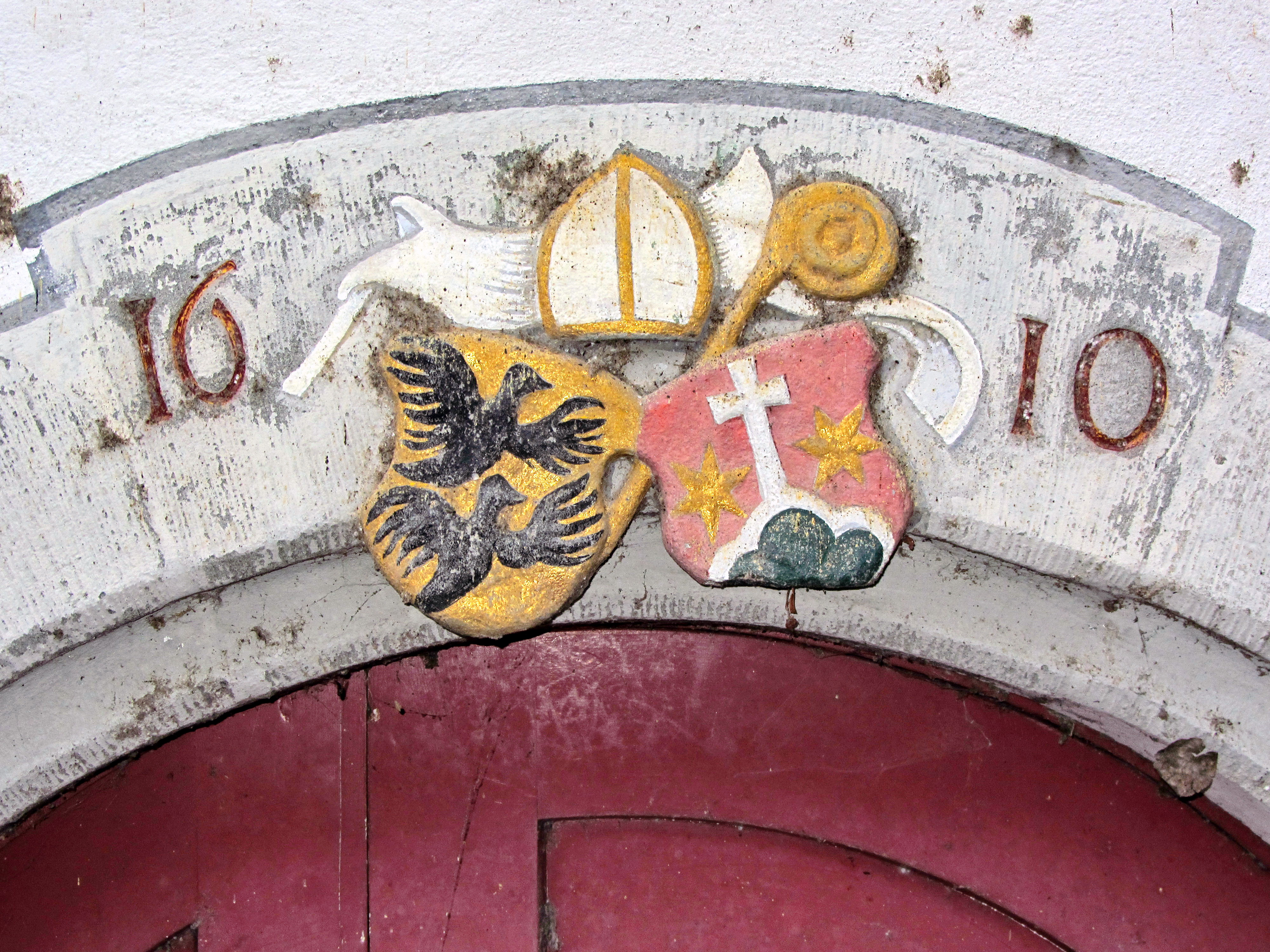
Coats of arms of the Einsiedeln Abbey and year 1610

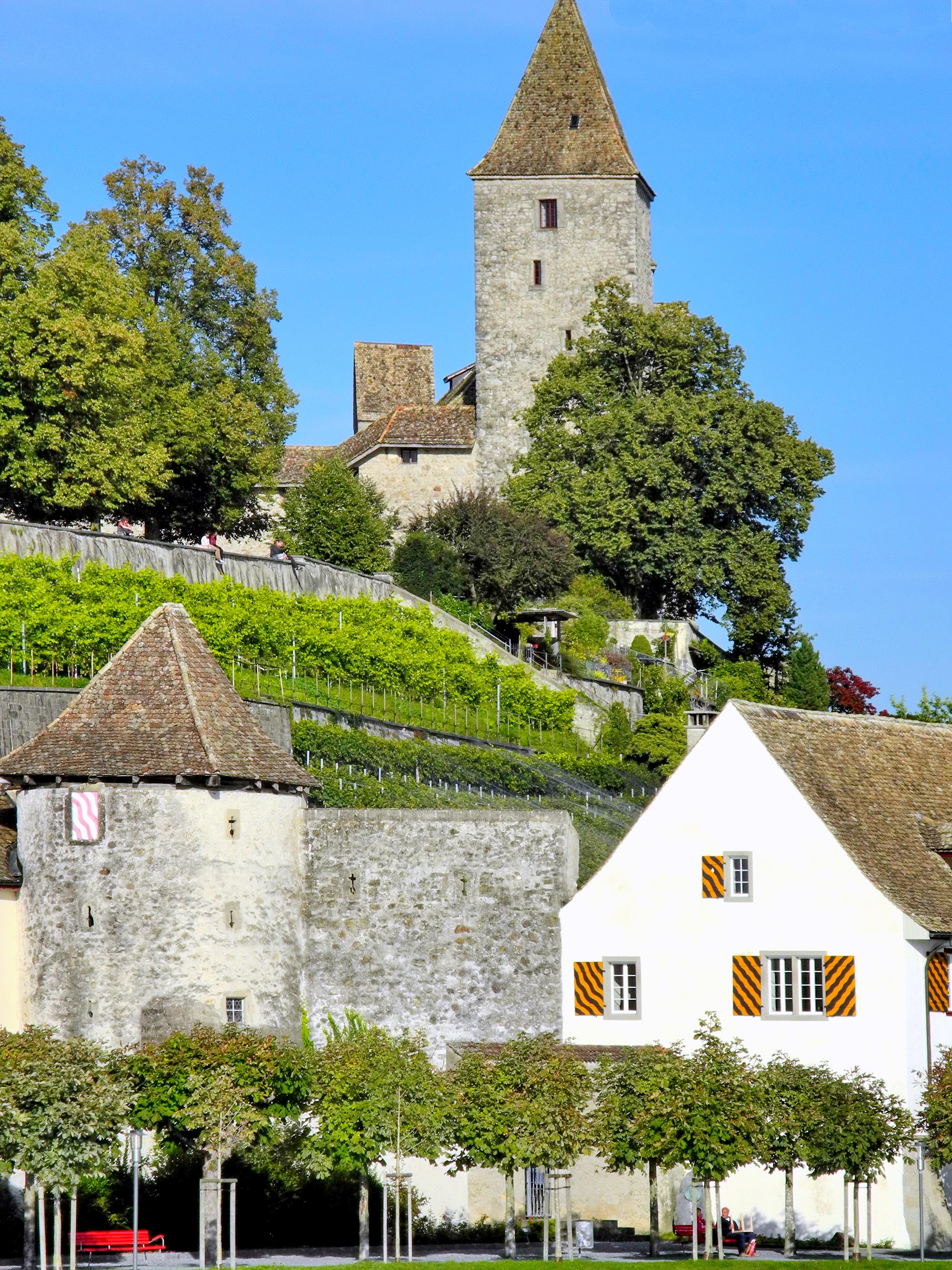
Endingertor tower and Einsiedlerhaus which formed a bulwark at the western town walls of Rapperswil, Rapperswil Castle on Lindenhof hill in the background

Probably in 1610 AD, on occasion of the construction of the Kapuzinerkloster, the three-storey building was renewed as the engraving 1610 may suggest. After a fire, the building got its present appearance in 1717, as well as probably the adjoint garden's walls which separate it from the Endingerstrasse lane respectively lake shore, and the neighbouring vineyard Schlossberg. In 1972 the building was restored by the city of Rapperswil. Einsiedlerhaus is a protected building but located in the zone plan for public buildings and facilities. In 2011/12 its interior was rebuilt for CHF 850,000 to house the Haus der Musik, literally "house of music", for 25 years.

=== Endingertor ===
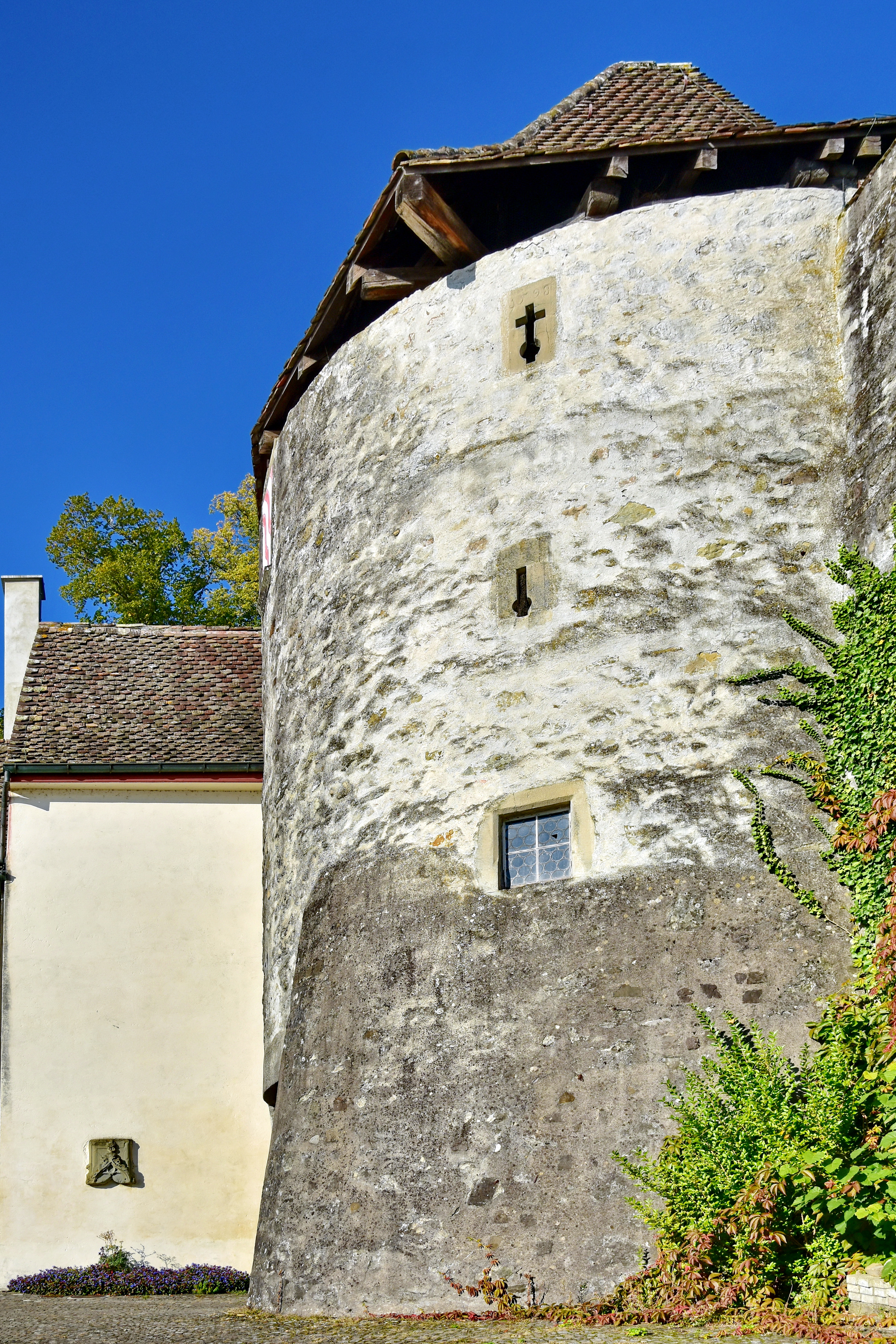
Endingertor

Endingerturm respectively since about 1597 in fact Endingertor is one of four remaining towers of the medieval fortifications of Rapperswil. Until 1610 the present gate tower and Einsiedlerhaus formed a bulwark that was protecting the inner harbor, now Fischmarktplatz, flanked by palisades at the westerly Endingerhorn where in the 1660s a lakeside battery was built. The architectural history of the shell tower in the south of the Schlossberg area is largely unclear, but assumably Count Rudolf II or his son attached it around 1220 to the Einsiedlerhaus (that probably was built much earlier) when the southern city wall in the first construction phase towards Hauptplatz at the Rathaus Rapperswil was built. Endingerturm formed until 1597 the western end of the lakeside fortification when a breakthrough was taken to fortify the present Endingerhorn. Whether the half-tower was originally built open or closed on the city facing side, is also unknown.

== Haus der Musik ==
Since the building was no more used as a mill, the following decades there were done some studies for a new intended usage. Haus der Musik is a youth music school provided by the proMusicante association and started teaching in September 2012. The structural maintenance and loan has to be paid to the monastery of Einsiedeln as it owns the building. In 2011 the contract was conducted between the city of Rapperswil and proMusicante to house the school up to 25 years, as well as by the Jugendmusikschule Rapperswil-Jona which was looking for new rooms.

== Rose garden ==
In the same year when the Einsiedeln Abbey ended the contract that the Capuchin's allowed to use the adjoining garden as an orchard, the city transformed it into a rose garden to enlarge the neighbouring gardens on Lindenhof hill (Schlossberg). The fountain in the garden is a gift by the surrounding municipalities on occasion of Rapperswil's 750th anniversary; an old fountain bowl made of Jurassic limestone, skillfully restored and remodeled. The rose garden is divided by crossroads in four large beds and is surrounded on all four sides of border rebates. The planting was carried out in advance with older Floribunda and some standard roses.

== See also ==
- Lindenhof (Rapperswil)
- Kapuzinerkloster Rapperswil

== Literature ==
- Peter Röllin: Kulturbaukasten Rapperswil-Jona. Rapperswil-Jona 2005. ISBN 3-033-00478-4
