= Martha Burkhardt =

Swiss artist, photographer (1874–1956)

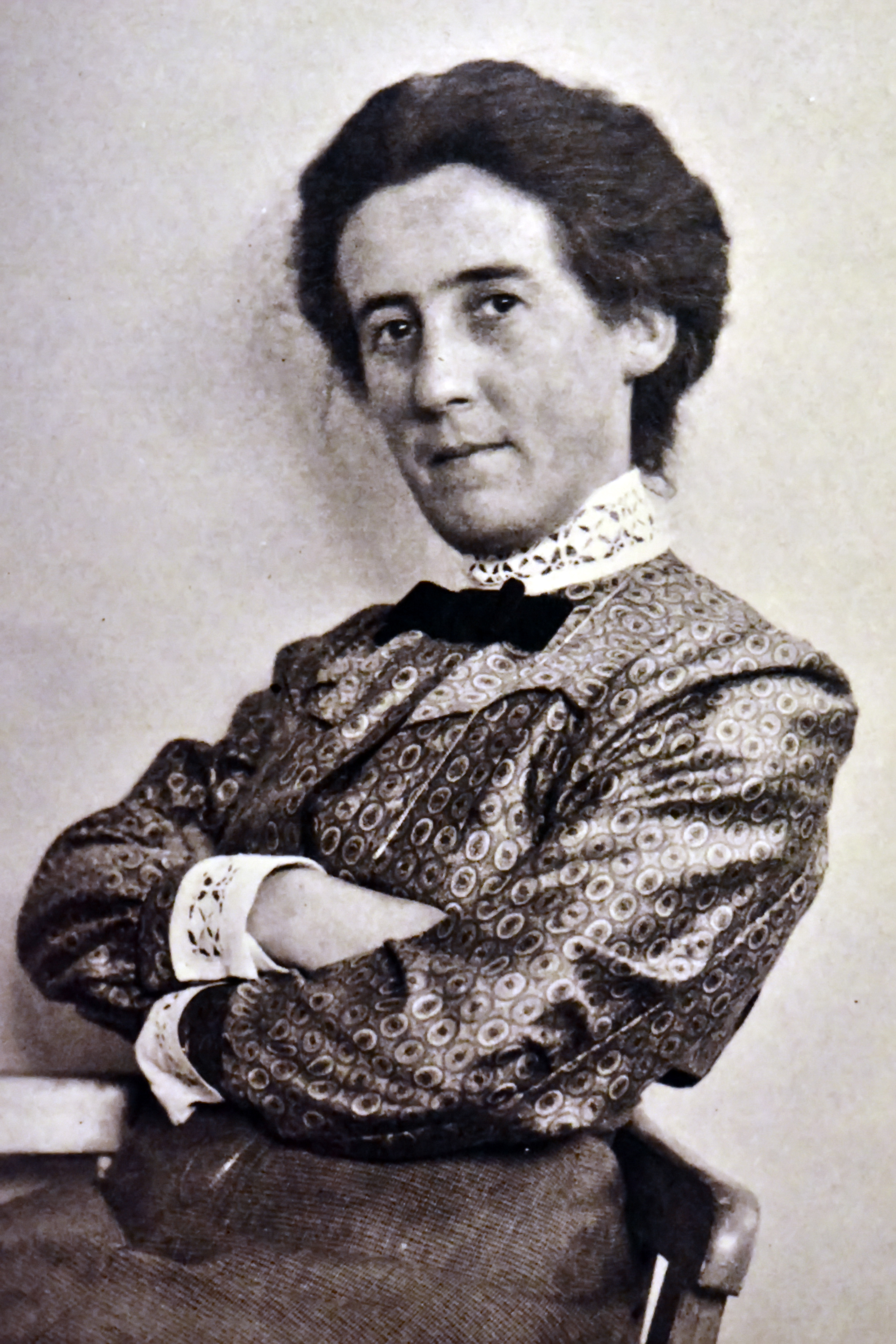
- Self-portrait around 1910
- Born: 30 April 1874; Aarau
- Died: 12 January 1956 (aged 81); Rapperswil
- Education: Academy of Fine Arts, Munich
- Known for: Drawing, painting
- Movement: Impressionism

Martha Burkhardt (30 April 1874 – 12 January 1956) was a Swiss painter and photographer. Born in the city of Aarau, she spent her childhood in Rapperswil and as an adult made Rapperswil again her home.

== Early life and education ==
Martha Burkhardt's family moved to Rapperswil in 1880, where her grandparents operated a business at Fischmarktstrasse 6 and where she spent her childhood. A year later, Martha and her younger brother Max lost her father and her grandfather and grew up in her mother's and grandmother household. The siblings were artistically gifted, and Max became a decorative painter and later a photographer in Arbon. The rebellious young woman ignored repeatedly the social limits which were imposed to women at the beginning of the 20th century, among others "she was the first woman in Rapperswil who boarded a bike, to the horror of frightened minds". Like her brother, Martha was interested in painting. Aged about 15, she worked as a domestic helper in Lausanne to spend the so-called Welschlandjahr which at that time usually teenage women absolved in western Switzerland (Welschland) to improve the knowledge of the French language. There, a teacher noticed Martha's artistic talent, but the federal art academy only allowed boys to study. Her first experiences as a painter were in Paris, France, from 1898. She then studied from 1901 to 1906 in München, Germany, as student of the professors Jankk and Feldbusch. At the school of artists in München she met her future girlfriend Meta Kirchner.

== Voyages and work ==
Back in Switzerland, Martha Burkhardt established in Rapperswil her own atelier to work independently as a painter and to participate exhibitions. She succeeded, and the proceeds from the sale of her paintings allowed her, every year for a few weeks, to go on the road, among others to Italy, Scandinavia and Morocco, and also extensive trips to France, Spain, Russia and even to Constantinople. She also undertook landscape studies in the Netherlands and in Sweden. From Meta Kirchner, she received an invitation to the coronation of King George V on occasion of the Delhi Durbar of 1911, from where she traveled extensively through Asia from 1911 to 1914, although few tourists were in those years without male accompaniment. Deeply impressed by the Asian spirituality, she processed her impressions of India, China and Japan in her pictures and wrote newspaper articles and books which she illustrated herself.

Back in Rapperswil, the artist took part in public life. During World War I she was engaged in the food commission of the city, and founded an emergency hospital during the 1918 flu pandemic. Then she was for many years president of the family welfare in the public women's association. Martha Burkhardt established the free child care of the charitable women's association and founded the first exchange for adopted children in Rapperswil. In 1927 she retired to her self-built house on the Meienberg hill between Rapperswil and Jona.

== Publications ==
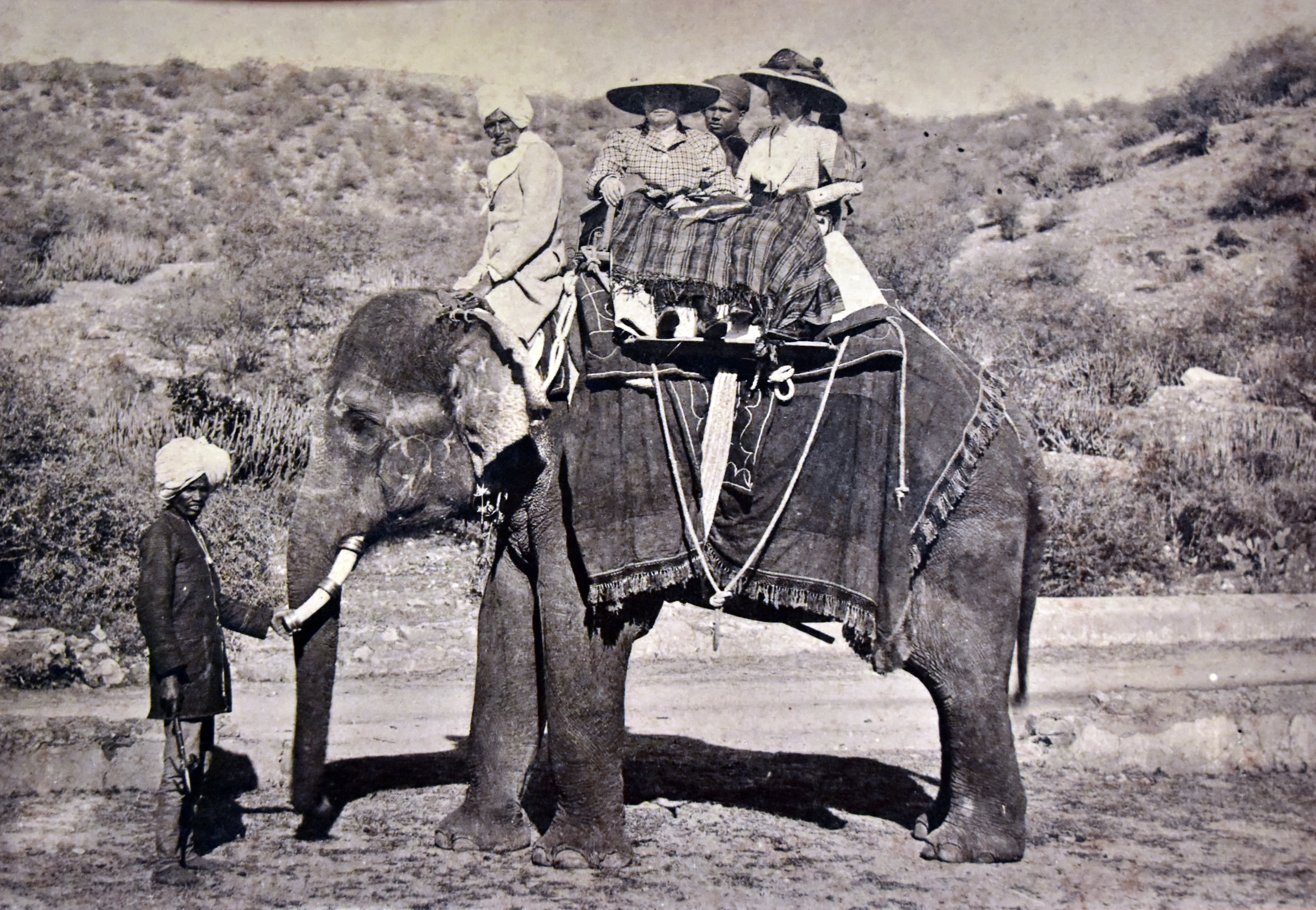
Meta Kirchner and Martha Burkhardt (to the right) 1911 in India

- Chinesische Kultstätten und Kultgebräuche. Erlenbach 1920, 2010 reprint by Kessinger Publishing, ISBN 978-1168541581.
- Rapperswil die Rosenstadt erzählt aus ihrer ereignisvollen Vergangenheit sowie von ihrem tätigen und vergnüglichen Leben der Gegenwart zu hundert Zeichnungen. Erlenbach-Zürich und Leipzig 1921.
- Magie und Mystik, Gegensatz und Zusammenhang. Zürich und Leipzig 1935.
