= Rapperswil Rose Gardens =

Rose gardens in Switzerland

Rosengarten Rapperswil
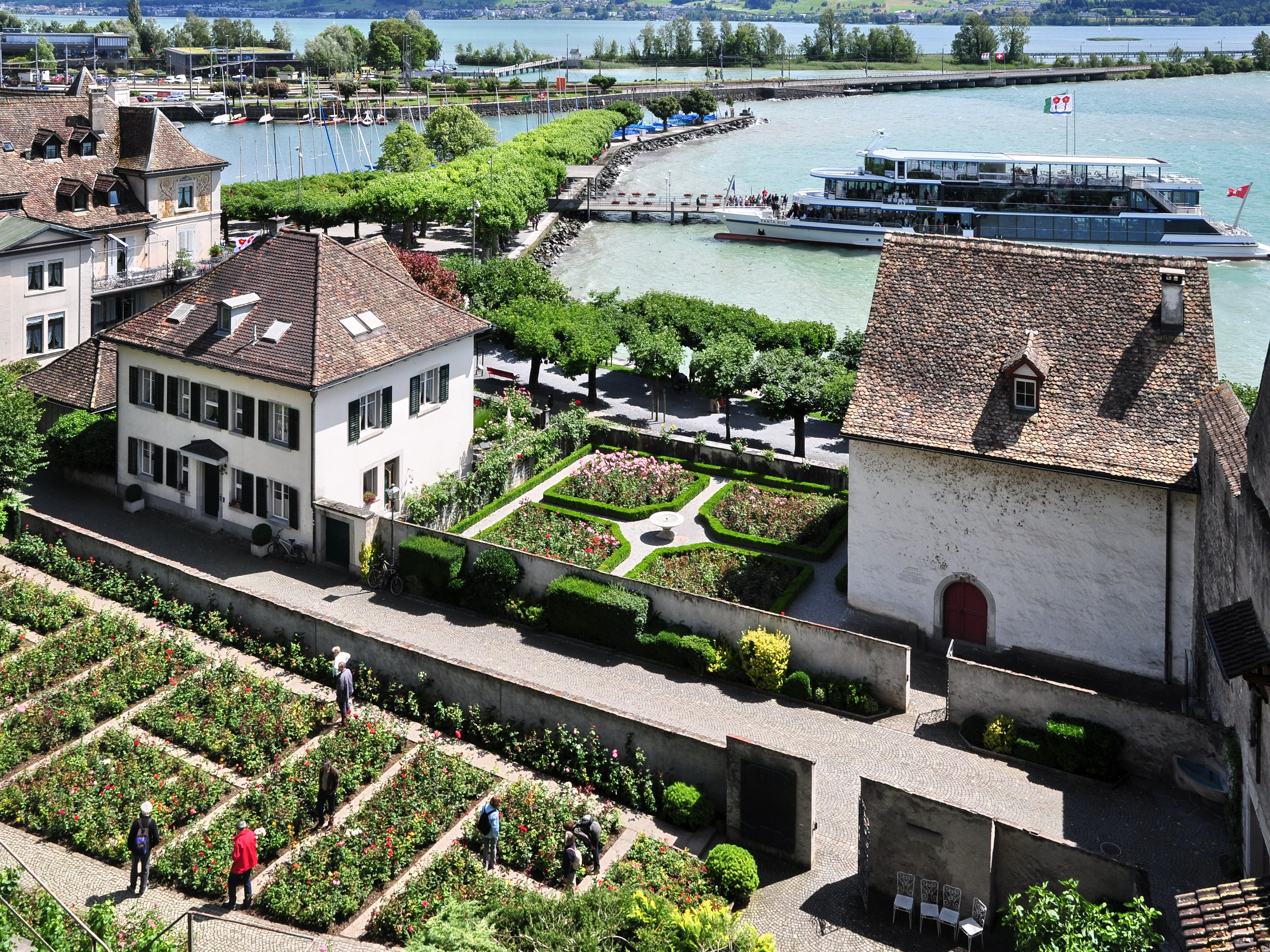
- Rose gardens at the Schlossberg slope and at the so-called Einsiedlerhaus building in Rapperswil
- Interactive map of Rosengarten Rapperswil
- Type: City park and rose gardens
- Location: Rapperswil, Canton of St. Gallen, Switzerland
- Coordinates: 47°13′35.2″N 8°48′46.6″E
- Area: about 1,400 square metres (15,069 sq ft) at several sites
- Created: 1913, 1957, 1963
- Operator: City of Rapperswil-Jona
- Open: throughout the year

The Rapperswil Rose Gardens are privately established small rose gardens probably dating back to the early years of the former independent town of Rapperswil. They are located in the present city of Rapperswil-Jona, Canton of St. Gallen, in Switzerland.

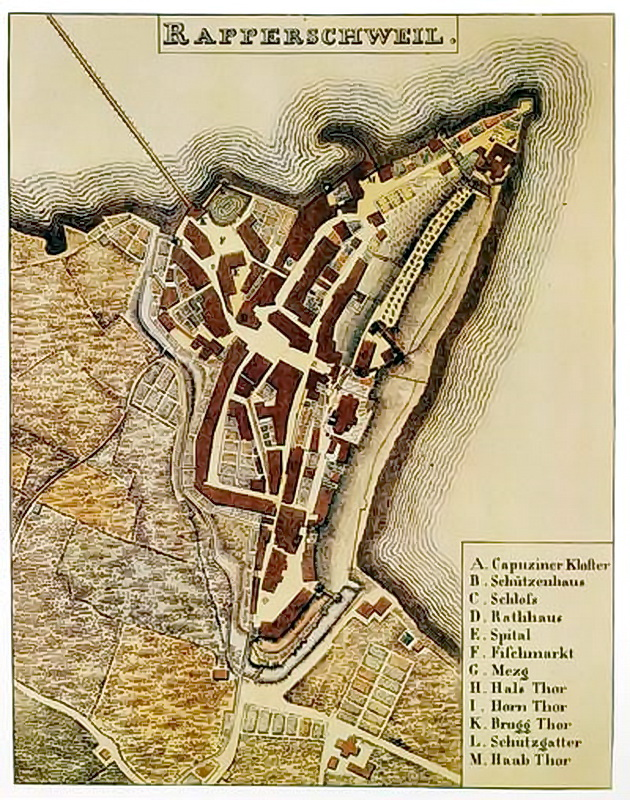
Town walls of Rapperswil around 1829, showing the area of the privately owned gardens at the former moat, and the present Duftrosengarten at the Obere Bahnhofstrasse road in Rapperswil.

== History ==
The coat of arms of the House of Rapperswil shows three roses, medieval and present Rapperswil has two roses in its coats of arms, as well as the present municipality of Rapperswil-Jona, and the former independent city and present locality of Jona. That is why we may assume that the first rose gardens date back to the early historical town, established at the Rapperswil Castle on the Lindenhof hill, and the historical Rapperswil Castle#Hintergasse lane where the ministeriales (knights) of the Rapperswil family built their homes around 1220 AD. The first documented rose gardens date back to the 1820s, shown on the map as the area of the privately owned gardens that still exist, and the present Duftrosengarten at the former moat, the present Obere Bahnhofstrasse road.

In modern times, the rose gardens in Rapperswil for the first time are documented from 1913 onwards. The Stadtverschönerungsverein (literal Association for Tourism and the Beautification of Rapperswil) adorned the harbour area by planting the first 'official' rose bed. It was located opposite to the present Bahnhof Rapperswil building, at the southern terminus of the so-called Seedamm isthmus, where the present Fischmarktplatz plaza is situated. This was followed by the creation of other gardens by the town's administration at the Zürichsee harbour in the 1920s, and finally on streets and squares mainly on the initiative of the women of Rapperswil. Dietrich Wössener single-handedly selected the rose varieties and planted most of the roses of the present city rose gardens in 1959.

== The rose gardens ==
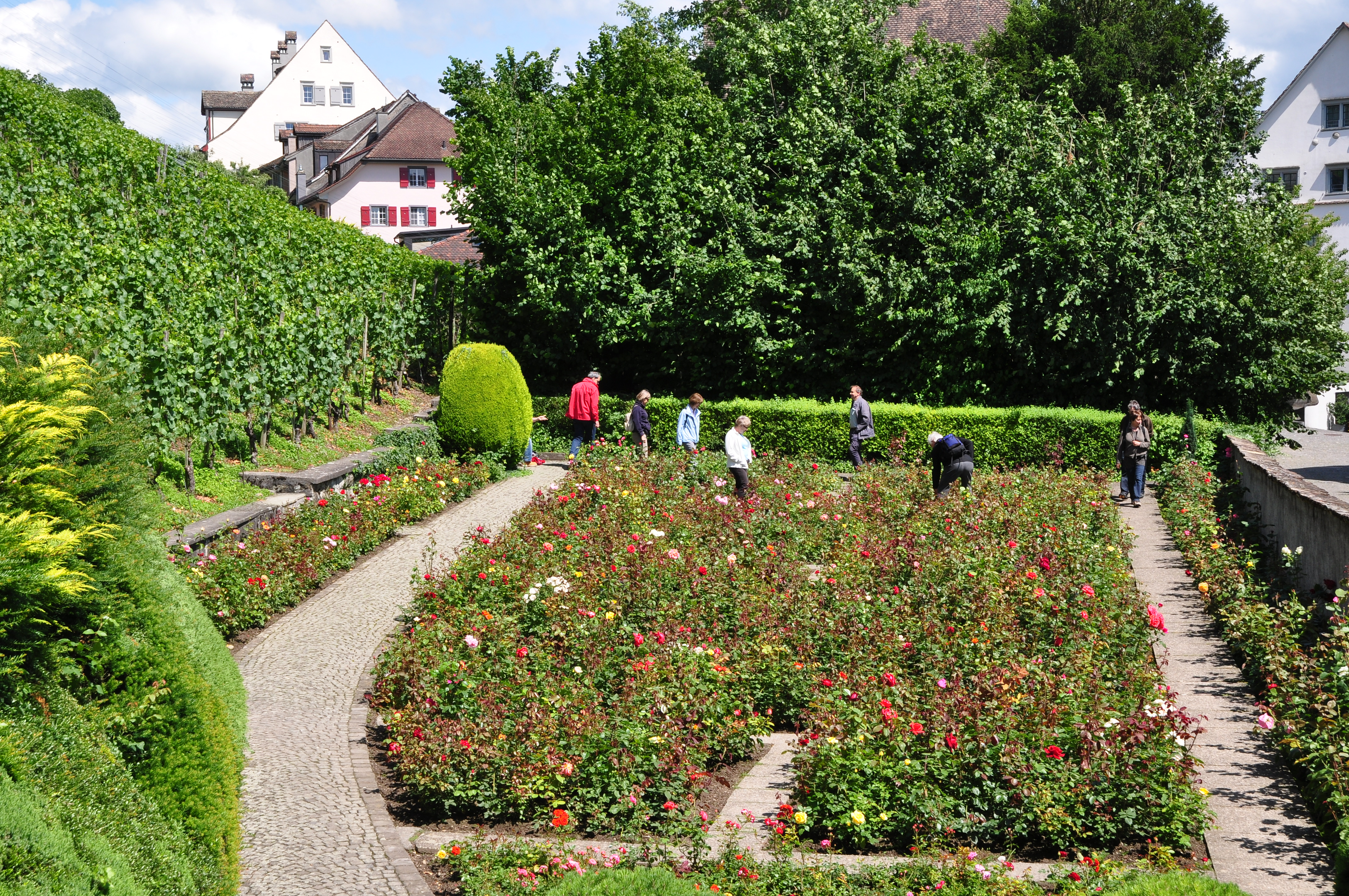
Rose garden at the Lindenhof hill

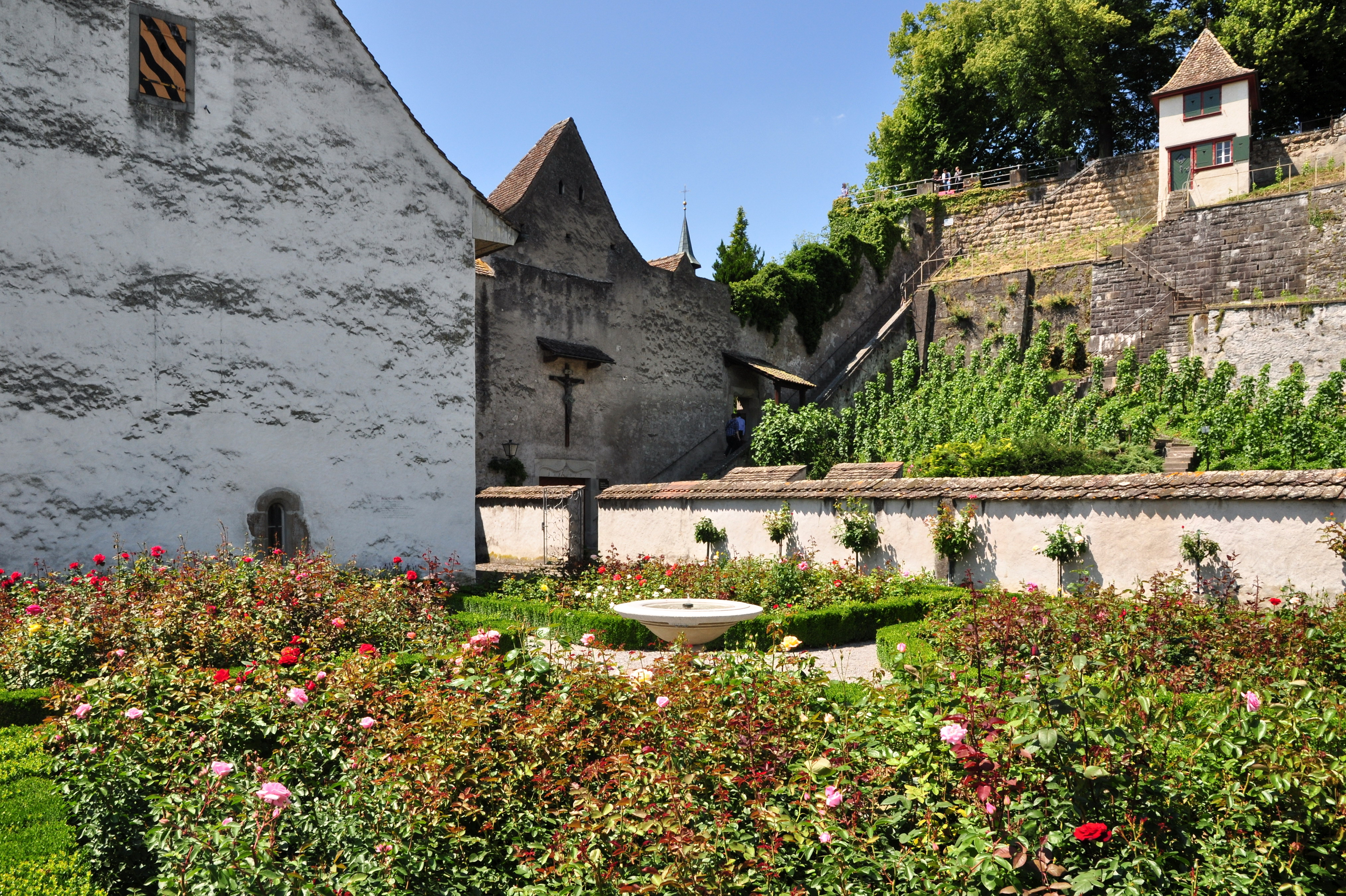
The neighbouring garden at Einsiedlerhaus

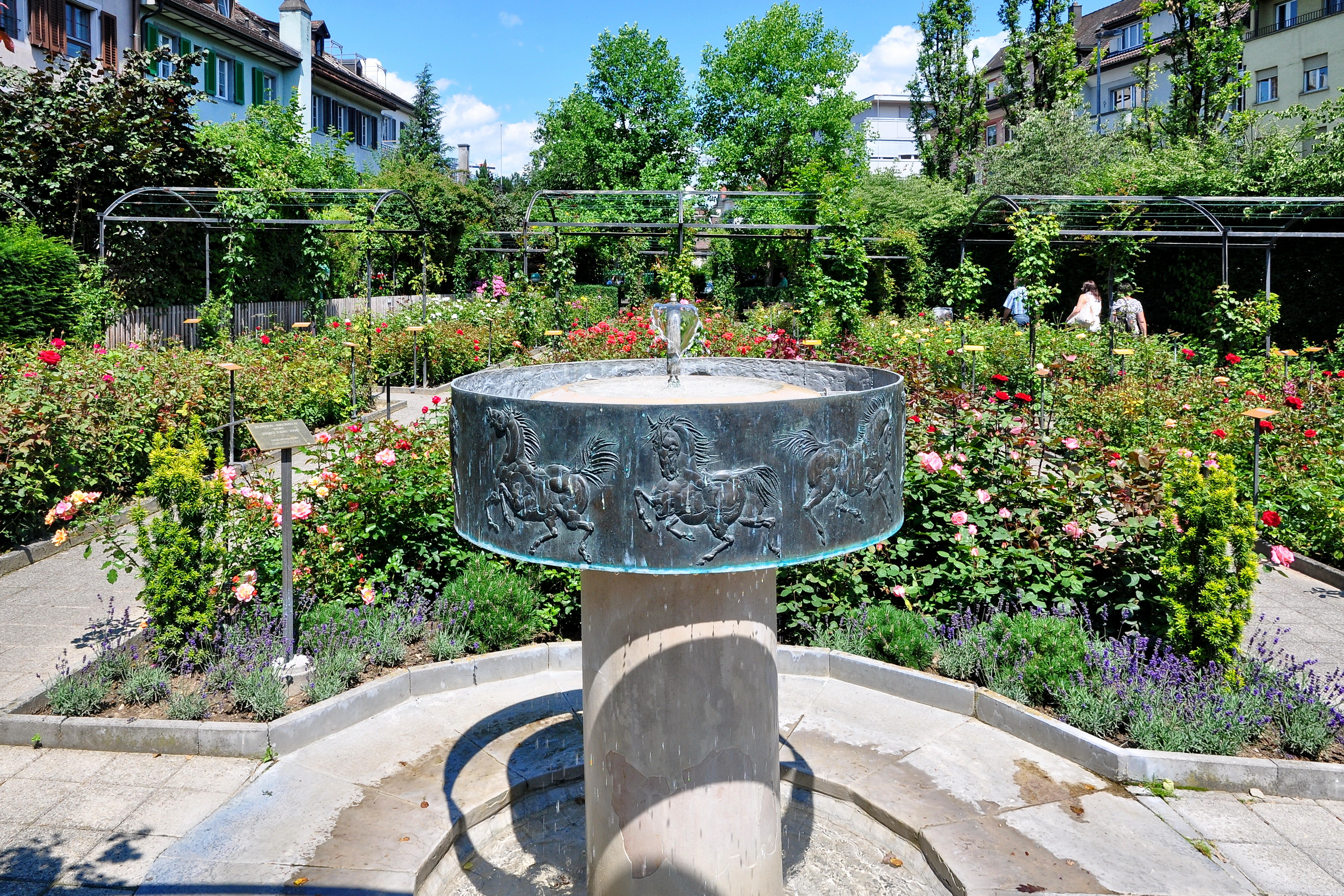
Duftrosengarten, Obere Bahnhofstrasse road

The cornerstone for the present 'official garden' was laid in 1965. The Curti family (Haus Schlossberg property) transferred ownership of some 500 square metres (5,382 sq ft) land in order to create a rose garden in return for a modest leasehold rent. It is located towards the Kapuzinerkloster Rapperswil, below the Lindenhof plateau, bordering the municipal vine yards. The garden comprises around 3,000 plants from 150 varieties. The costs of designing were found by the so-called Rosentaler Fonds, the roses were a gift from the women of Rapperswil. Polyantha roses were planted in the northern part and bed roses (hybrid tea) towards the Endingerstrasse lane which separates this section from the opposite garden at the Einsiedlerhaus building. The fountain consists of an earlier memorial stone for the creator of the first rose gardens, and an inscription was created by the local poet Pius Rickenmann. The bronze great crested grebe is a work by the Swiss sculptor Ernst Ghenzi which was financed by the Knie family.

The Einsiedlerhaus rose garden section dates back to 1974: the rose garden was extended at the location of the former orchard of the Capuchin monks – in return they received compensation for the loss of fruit. This smaller garden of about 350 square metres (3,767 sq ft) is divided into four beds by intersecting paths. It is bordered on all four sides by corner flower beds. Thed old tiered fountain in the middle of the garden was a gift on occasion of the 750th century of the town of Rapperswil. It was planted with older bed roses and a few standard rose bushes.

A unique site is the fragrant rose garden for the visually impaired and the disabled people, Duftrosengarten by its native name. Established in October 1984, it was created on the roof of the subterranean municipal parking facility Schanz, set aside for a very special purpose. It's still the only rose garden for the blind people in Switzerland, created on three private plots at Obere Bahnhofstrasse. It consists of 1,522 plants from 75 fragrant varieties; they are labelled with embossed Braille letters and normal lettering. On the rectangular area of about 600 square metres (6,458 sq ft) 75 volunteers planted 33 types of rose bush, 20 types of climbing roses and six shrub roses with particularly strong fragrances. The Swiss artist Hans Erni designed a decorative fountain which was financed by Circus Knie. Thanks to the heated underground facility, there is practically never any frost in the garden. That's why these fragrant roses blossom earlier than at most other roses in Switzerland as early as May, in the other gardens this takes place in June.

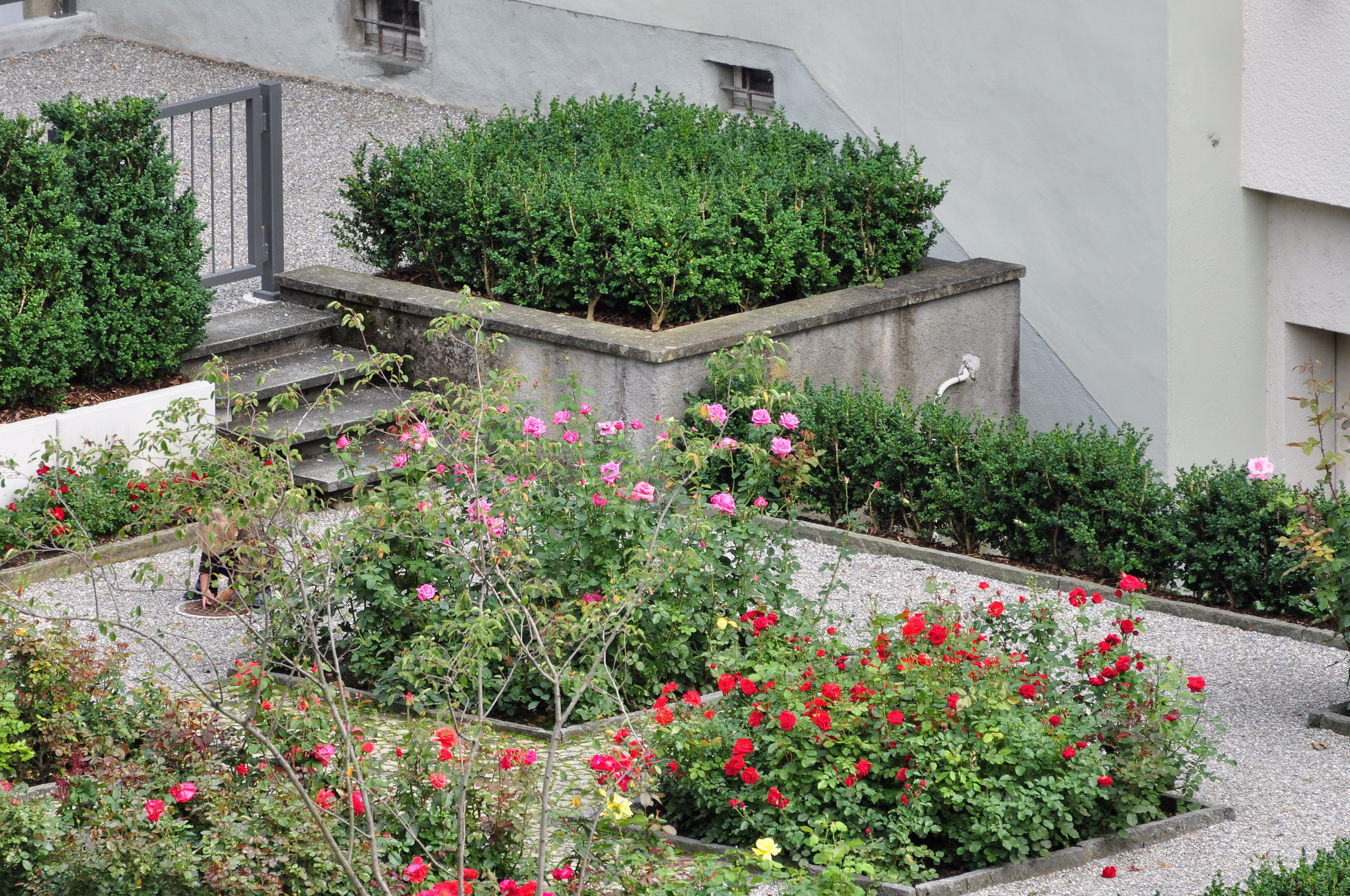
Privately own plants at the Hintergasse street

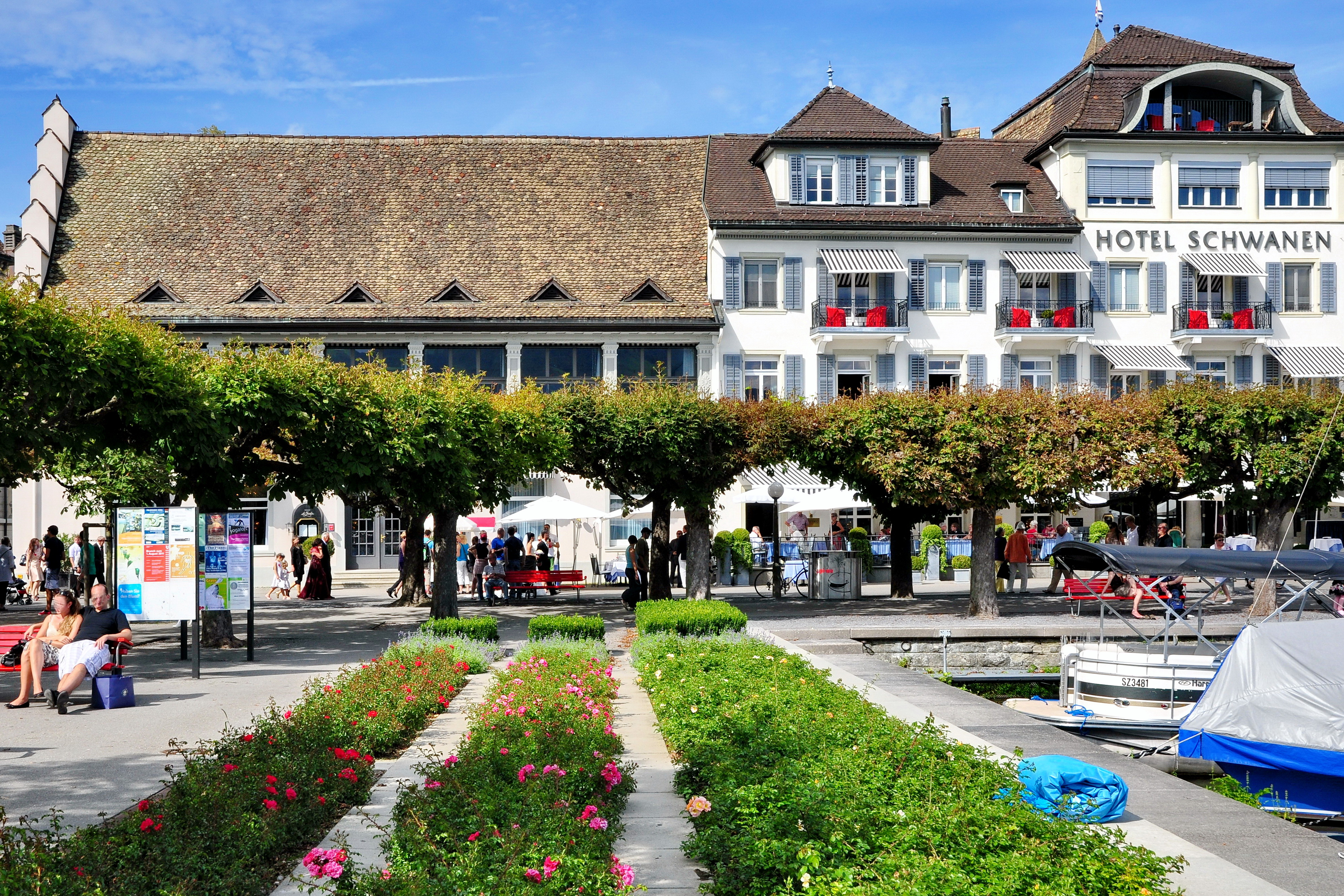
Hotel Schwanen rose plants at the harbour area next to the Zürichsee-Schifffahrtsgesellschaft landing gate

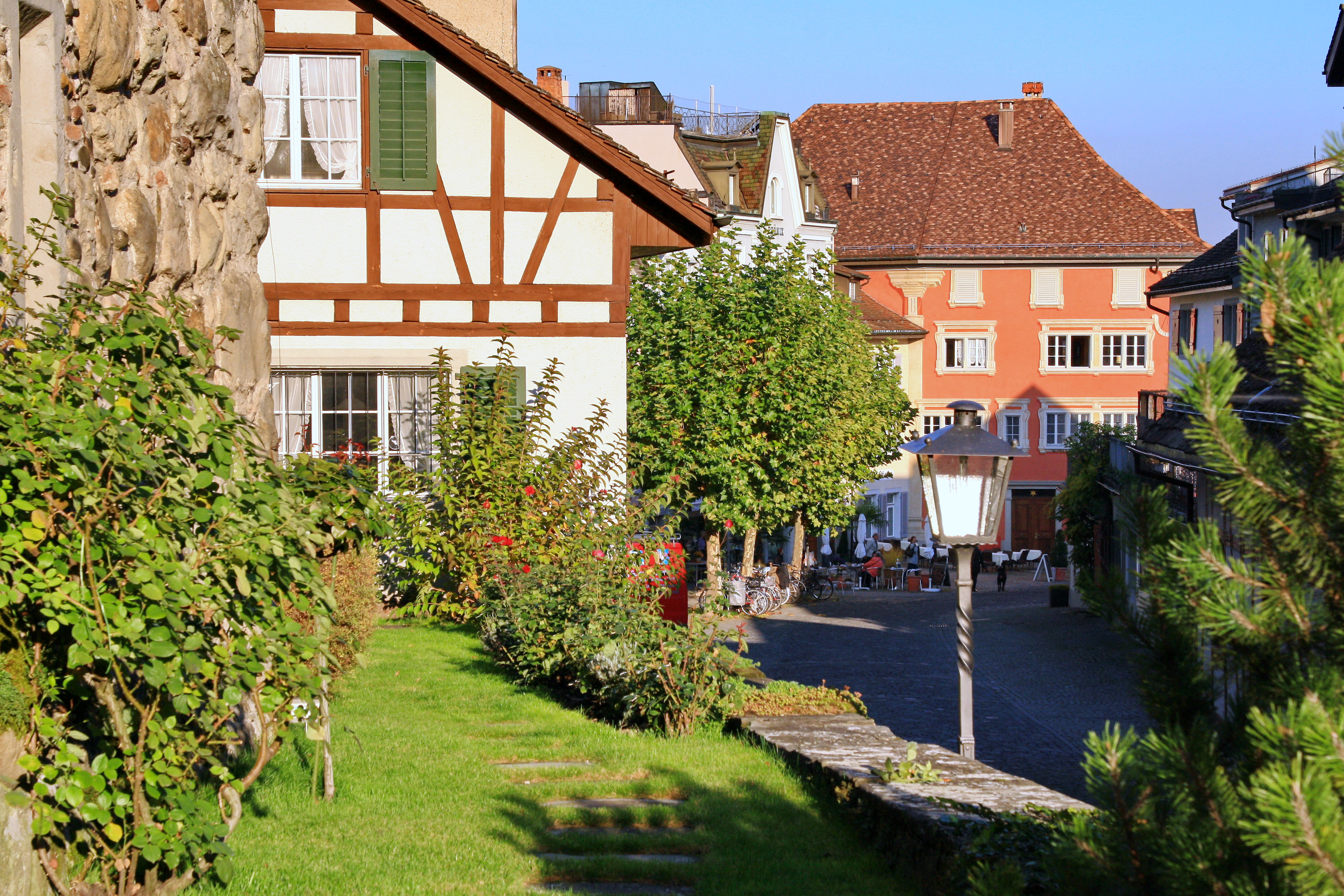
Stadtmuseum Rapperswil towards Engelplatz

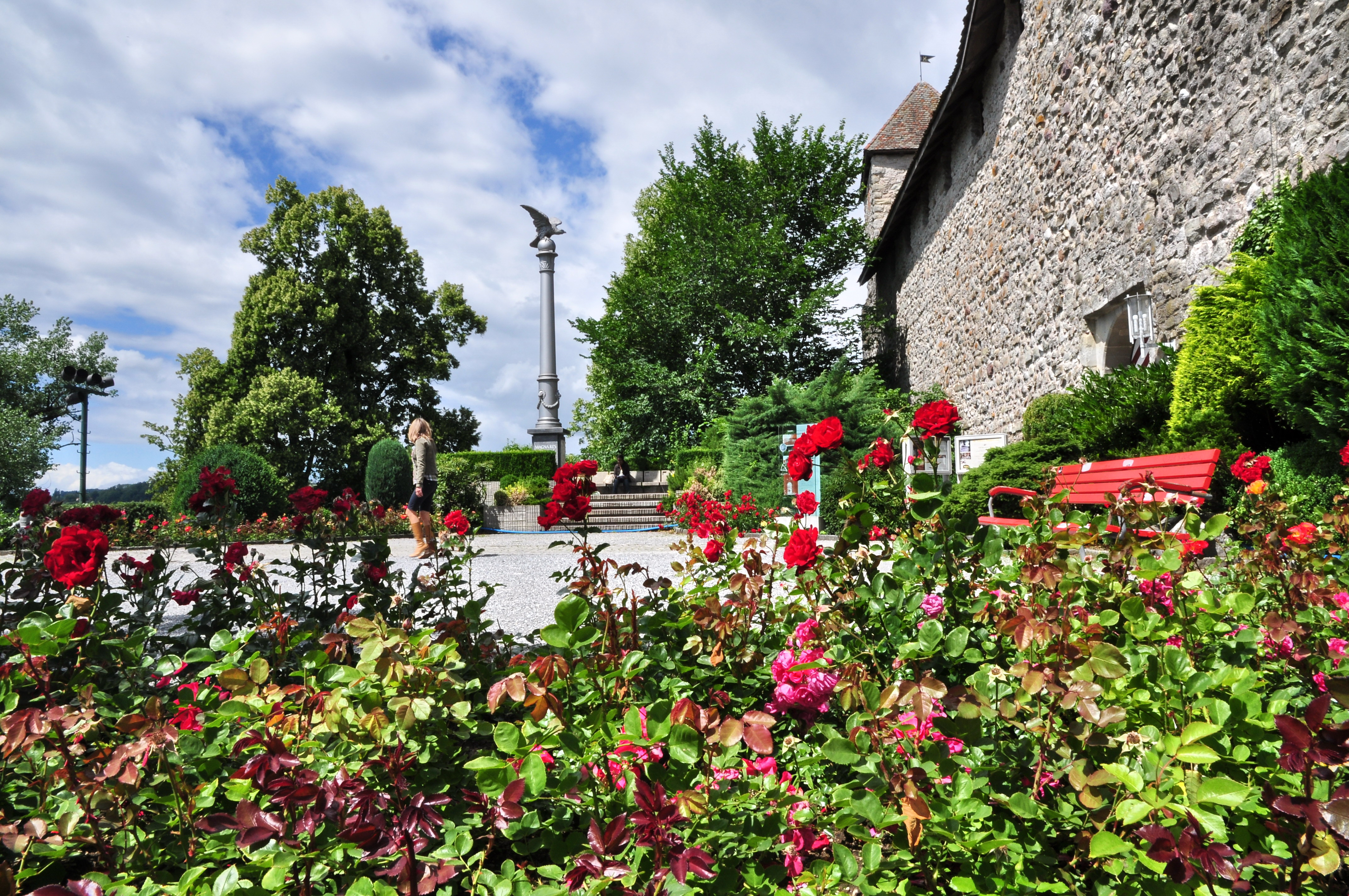
Lindenhof at the gate of the Rapperswil Castle

But the very first roses in Rapperswil blossom at the Stadtpfarrkirche St. Johann and Liebfrauenkapelle churches, and the present Stadtmuseum Rapperswil at the Herrenberg area next to the Schloss Rapperswil because their medieval sandstone walls are exposed to the sun all through the year. Over the centuries, the Altstadt below the hill has been almost completely overbuilt, but the Rapperswil women have samples to choose from in their very own tiny rose gardens for centuries.

== Rosenstadt Rapperswil ==
Maybe just a handful of cities and towns in Europe keenly promote their fragrant roses as in Rapperswil-Jona. This fact received public confirmation at the large commemorative rose festival in Nöggenschwiel in Southern Germany. In July 1999 leading European experts recorded and acknowledged Rapperswil to be the international Centre of fragrant roses.

== Literature ==
- Peter Röllin: Kulturbaukasten Rapperswil-Jona: 36 Museen ohne Dach. Rapperswil-Jona 2005, ISBN 3-033-00478-4.
- Martha Burkhardt: Rapperswil die Rosenstadt erzählt aus ihrer ereignisvollen Vergangenheit sowie von ihrem tätigen und vergnüglichen Leben der Gegenwart zu hundert Zeichnungen. Erlenbach-Zürich und Leipzig 1921.
