= Capuchin Friary, Rapperswil =

Capuchin friary in Switzerland

Coordinates: 47°13′36.75″N 8°48′45.70″E

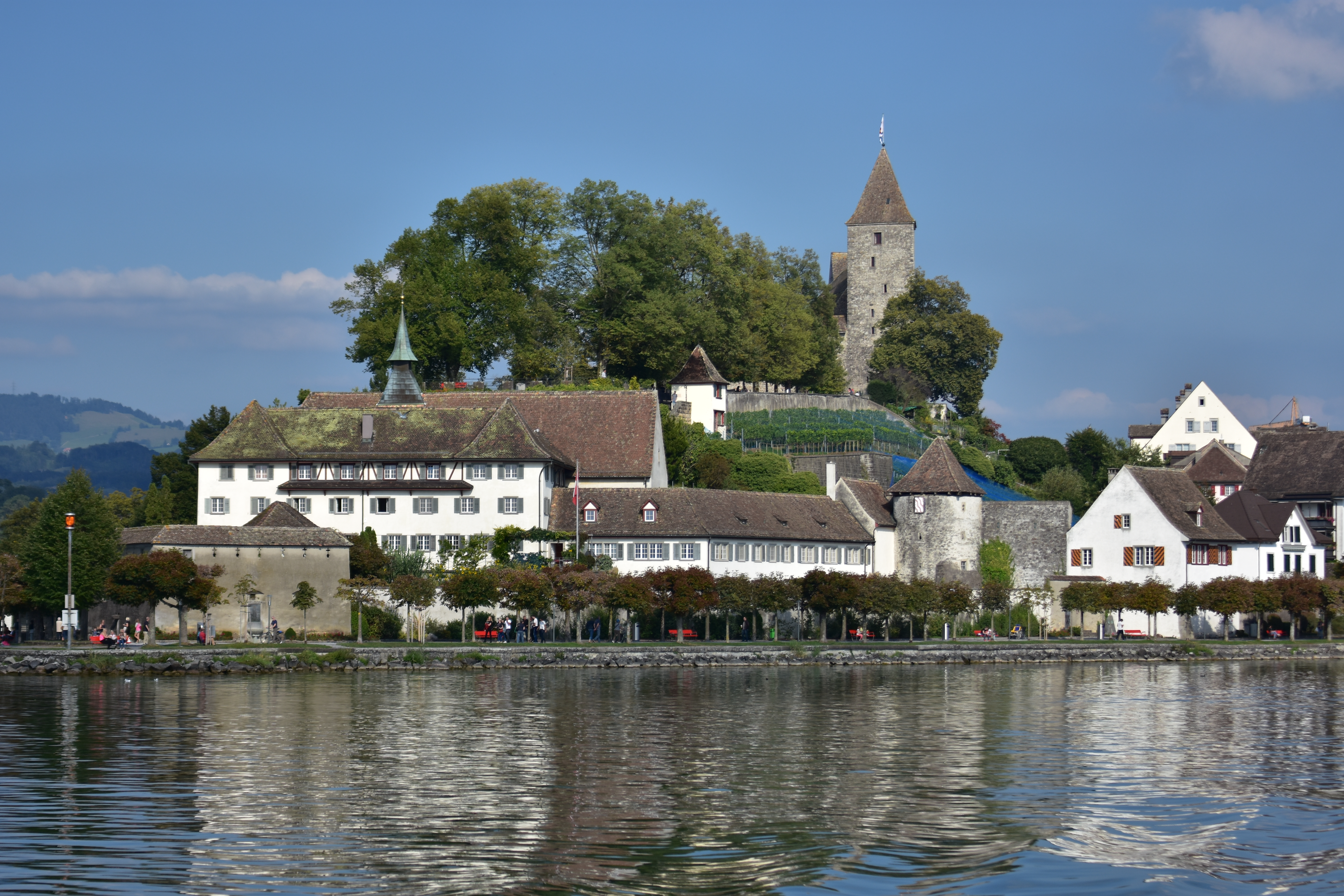
The monastic buildings, showing the Einsiedlerhaus to the right, and the Lindenhof hill of Rapperswil Castle in the background (September 2015)

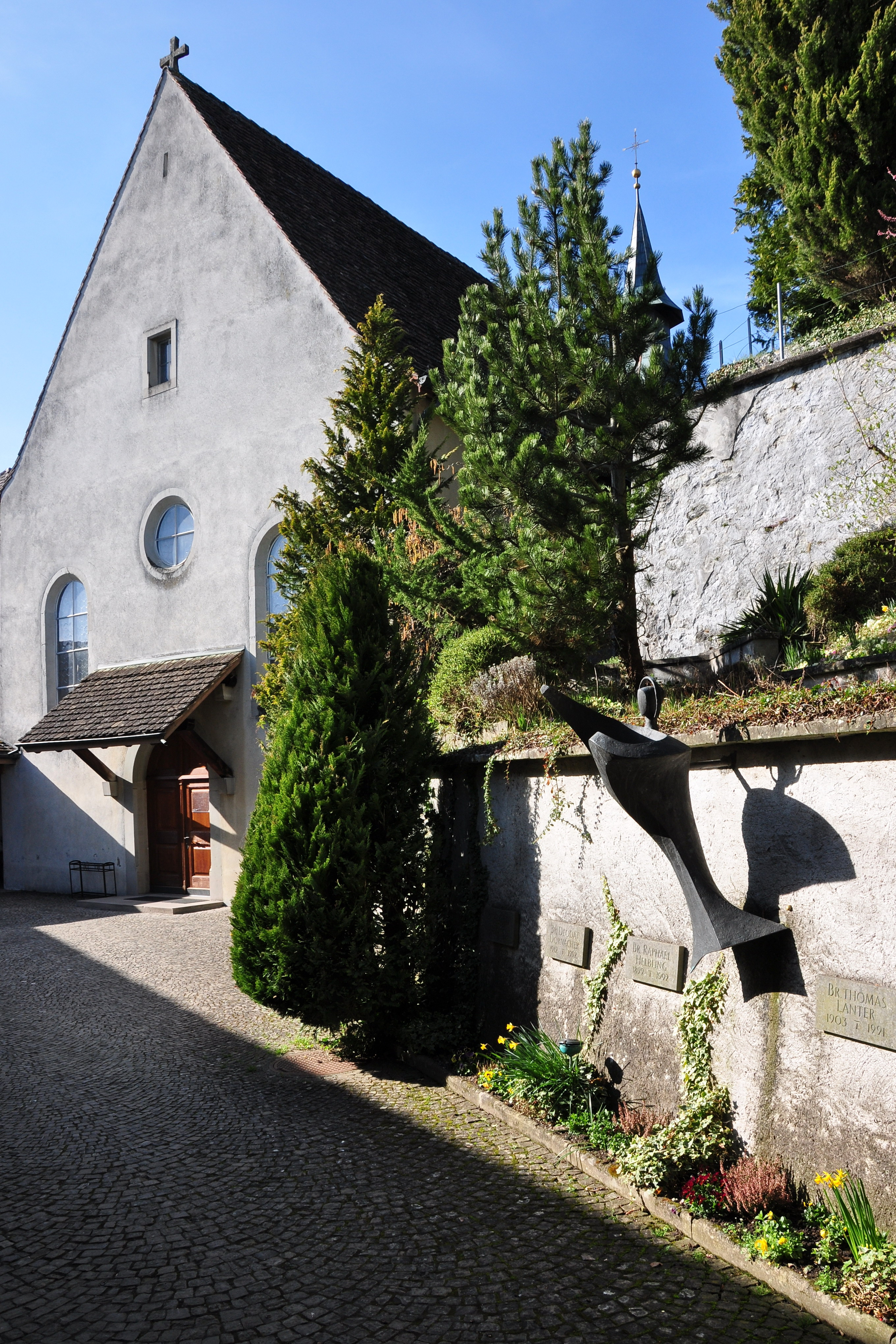
The Capuchin church

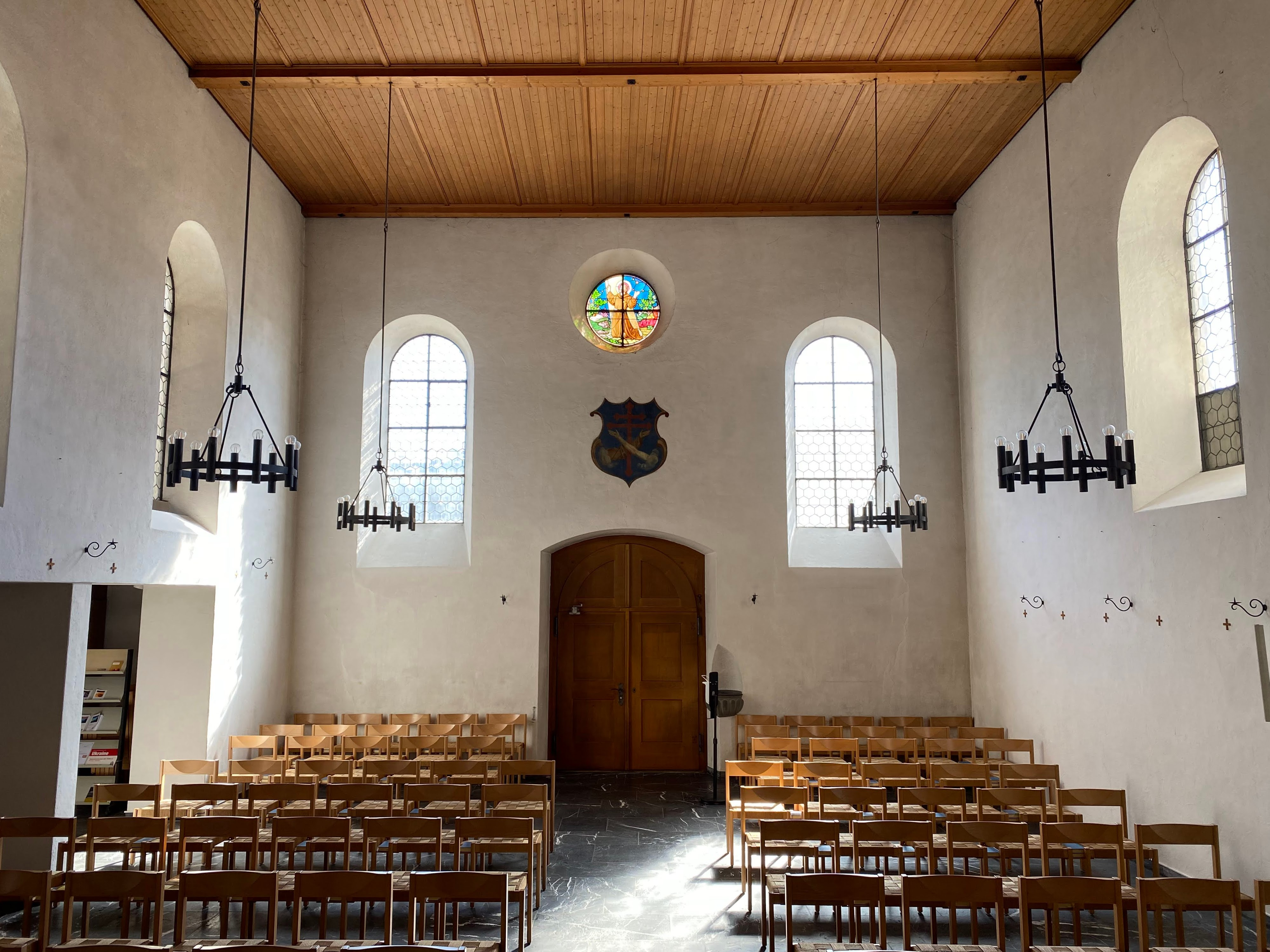
Interior of the church

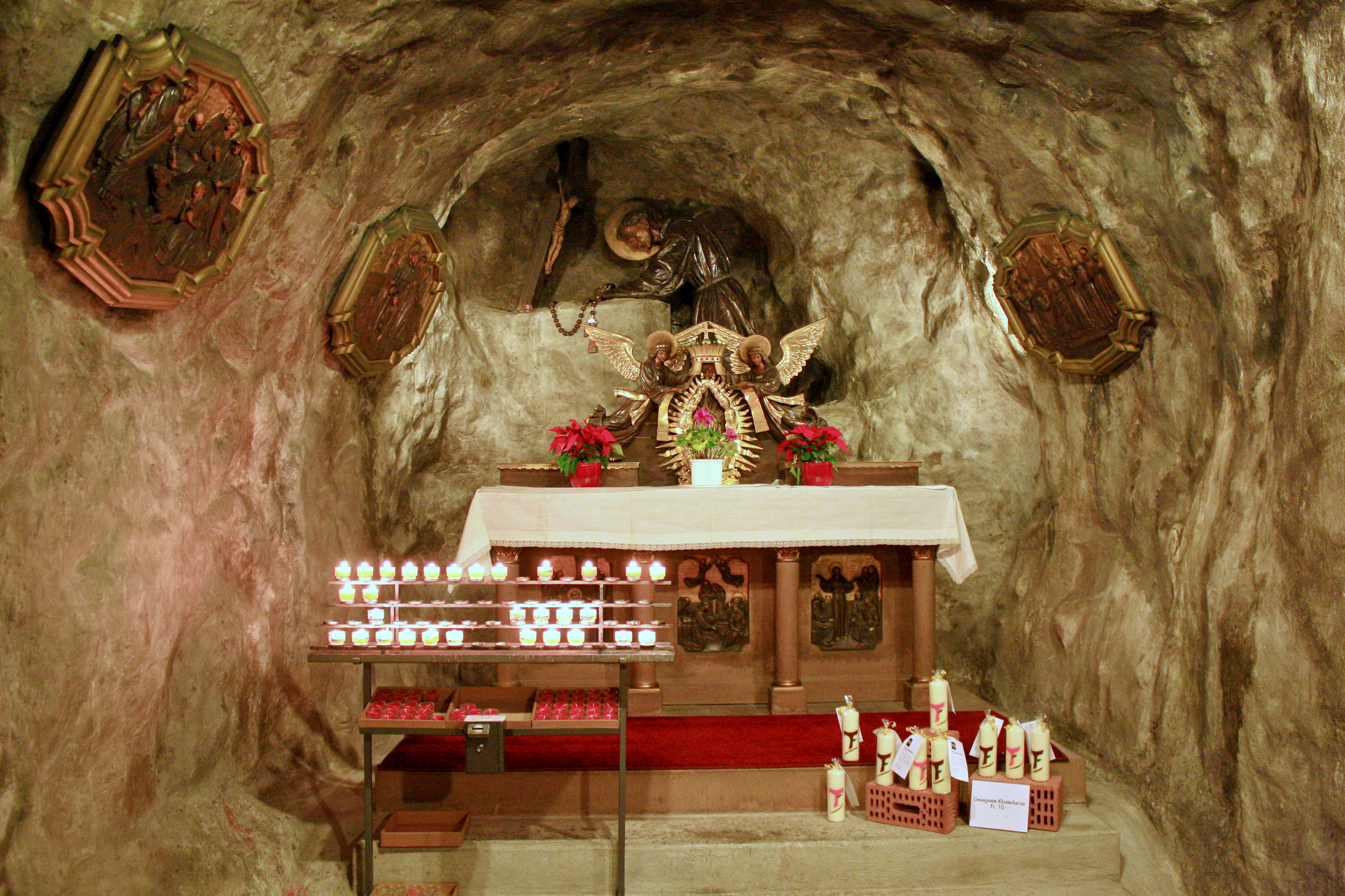
Antoniusgrotte (St. Anthony's Grotto)

The Capuchin Friary, Rapperswil, (German: Kapuzinerkloster Rapperswil) is a Capuchin friary located in Rapperswil in the Canton of St. Gallen, Switzerland.

== Geography ==
The monastery is situated to the west of the city of Rapperswil, below the Lindenhof of Rapperswil Castle on the shore of Lake Zürich on a peninsula called the Endingerhorn.

== History ==
The friary was established in 1606, consisting originally of only four patres (priests) and three brothers (friars), as a Roman Catholic counterpart to the centre of the Reformation in Zürich. The monastic buildings were built by the citizens of Rapperswil, and belong to the locality of Rapperswil, while Endingen - the site of the buildings - belongs to Einsiedeln Abbey. The friary was dedicated on 23 September 1607 by bishop Johannes V Flugi von Aspermont and is still in use. In 1662 the buildings were fortified: a small fort was built at Endingerhorn, and the monastery became part of the town walls as a fortified tower to the west of the city of Rapperswil.

== Sights ==
The friary is renowned for its location by the lake on a rocky peninsula. It overlooks Lake Zurich in the Kempratner Bucht ("Bay of Kempraten"). The rose gardens and the Antoniusgrotte, dedicated to Saint Anthony of Padua, attract pilgrims. The lakeside location of its church is also popular for weddings. The Einsiedlerhaus is in origin the medieval bailiff's house of Einsiedeln Abbey, whence the name, and is situated at the former late 10th century ferry gate to the islands of Lützelau and Ufenau.

== Activities ==
In November 1992 the monastery opened its doors for guests, both men and women, to participate for at least one week with the monastic community. In addition, the Swiss chapter of the order allowed the community to seek new forms of prayer and liturgy. As of 2010, nine brothers and two nuns (Orders of Baldegg and Menzingen) are living in the monastery.

== Cultural heritage ==
The building is listed in the Swiss inventory of cultural property of national and regional significance as a Class B object of regional importance.
