= Lindenhof (Rapperswil) =

Moraine hill and public square in Switzerland

Coordinates: 47°13′37″N 8°48′52″E

Lindenhof in Rapperswil is a moraine hill and a public square being the historic center of Rapperswil, Switzerland.

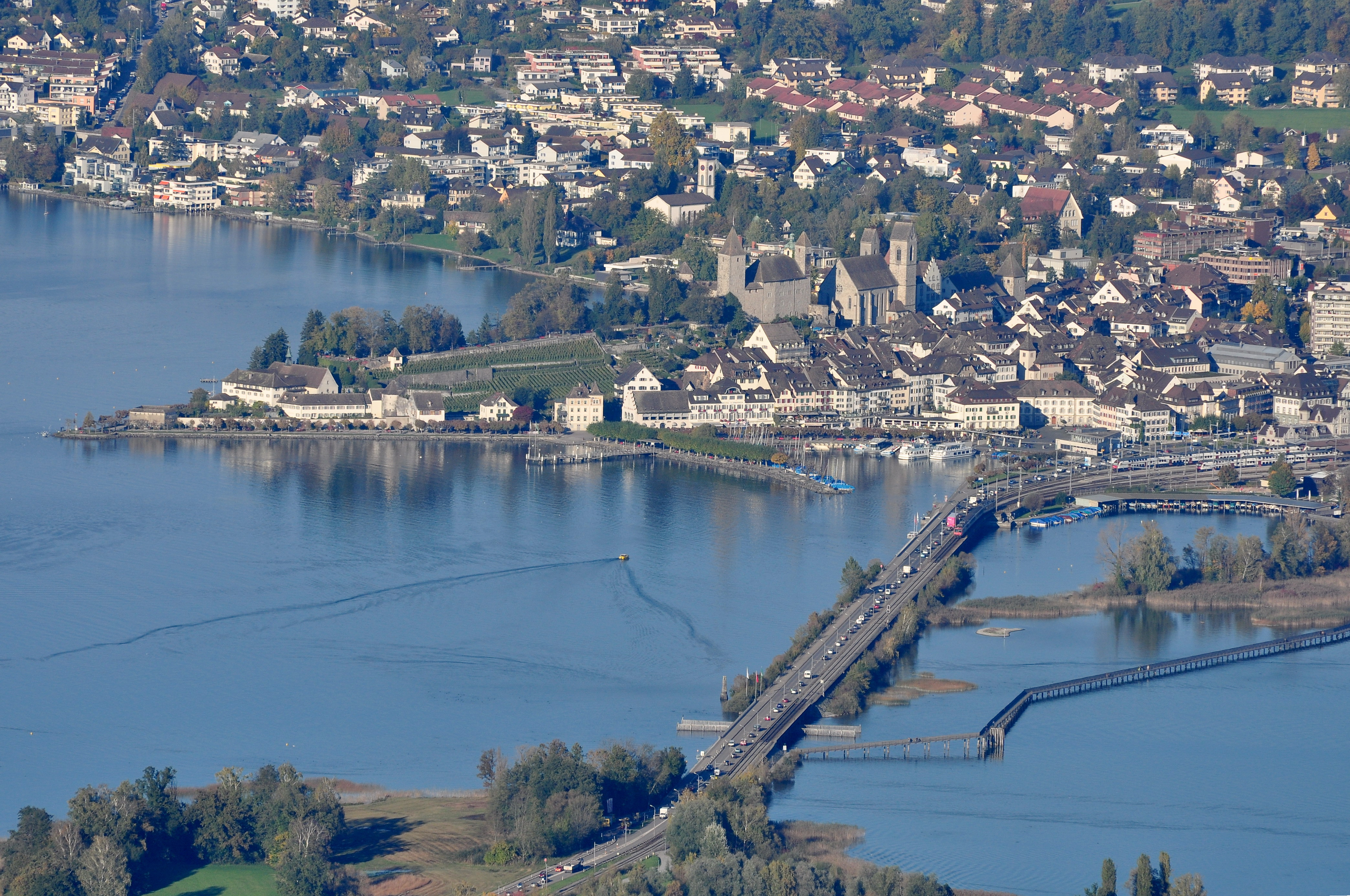
As seen from Etzel (mountain), Frauenwinkel protected area at Seedamm and the wooden lake bridge in the foreground, Zürichsee to the right, Obersee to the left.

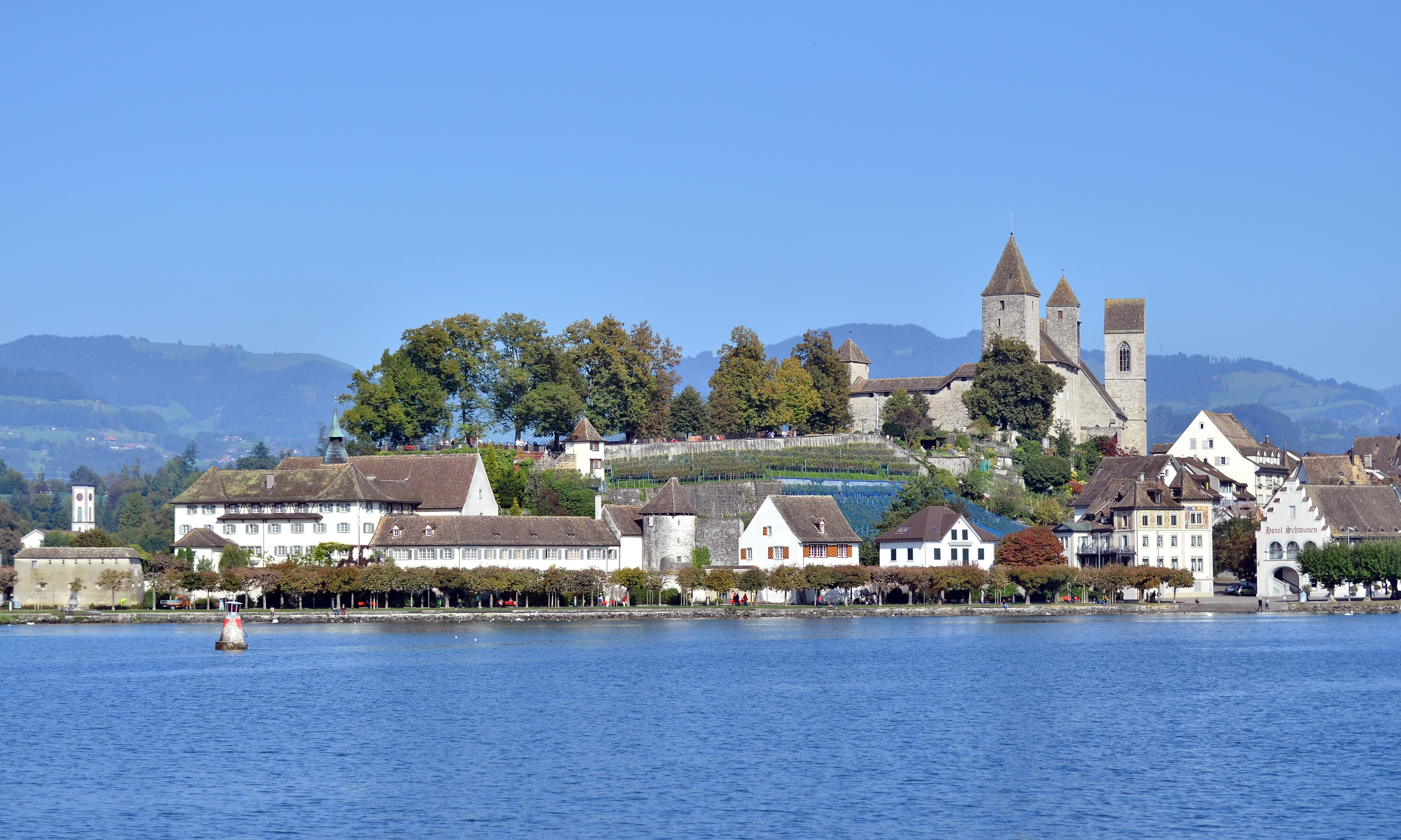
Lindenhof respectively Schlossberg vineyard and Bühler-Allee as seen from the harbour area towards Seedamm

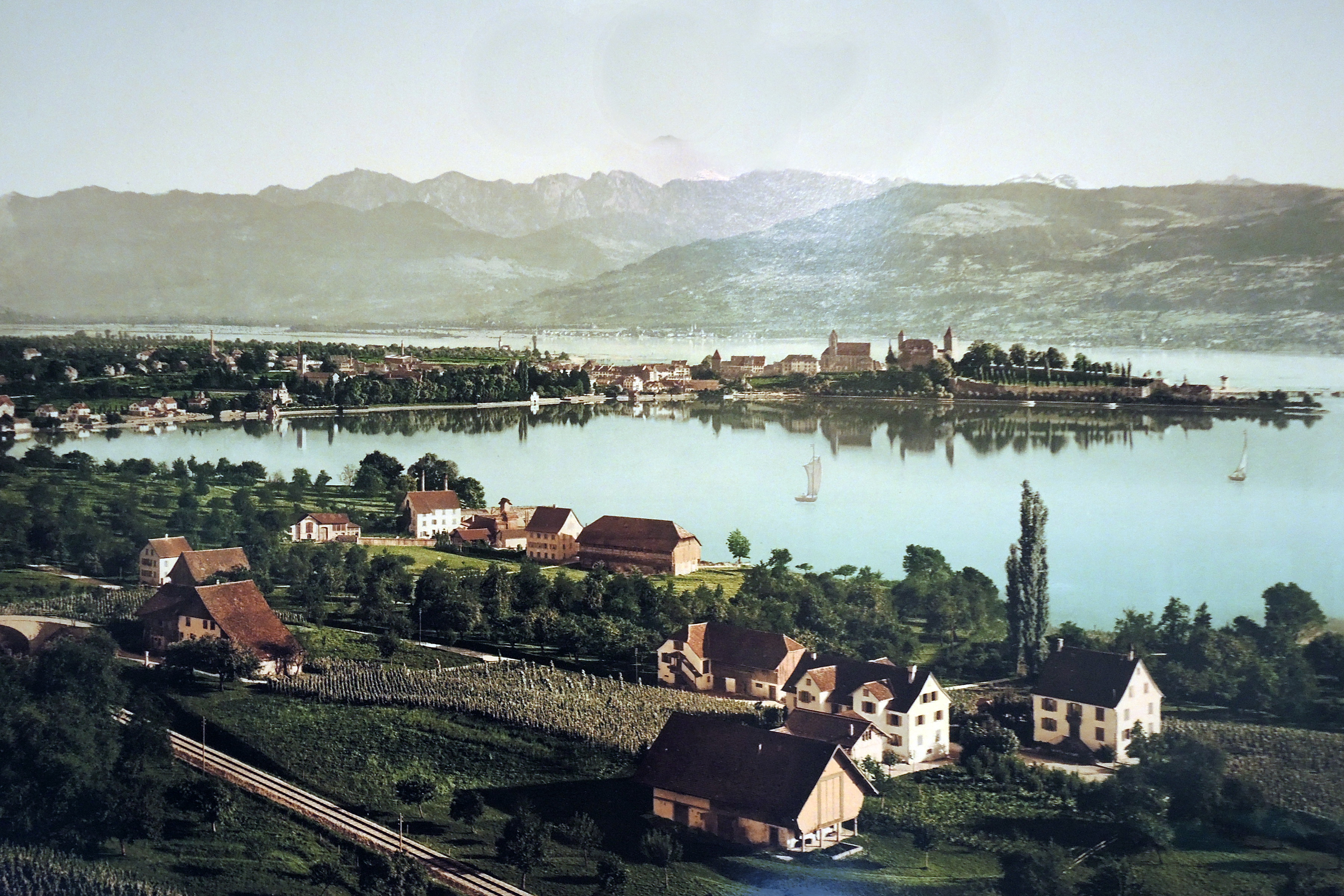
Lindenhof as seen from Kempraten on a photochrome of 1899

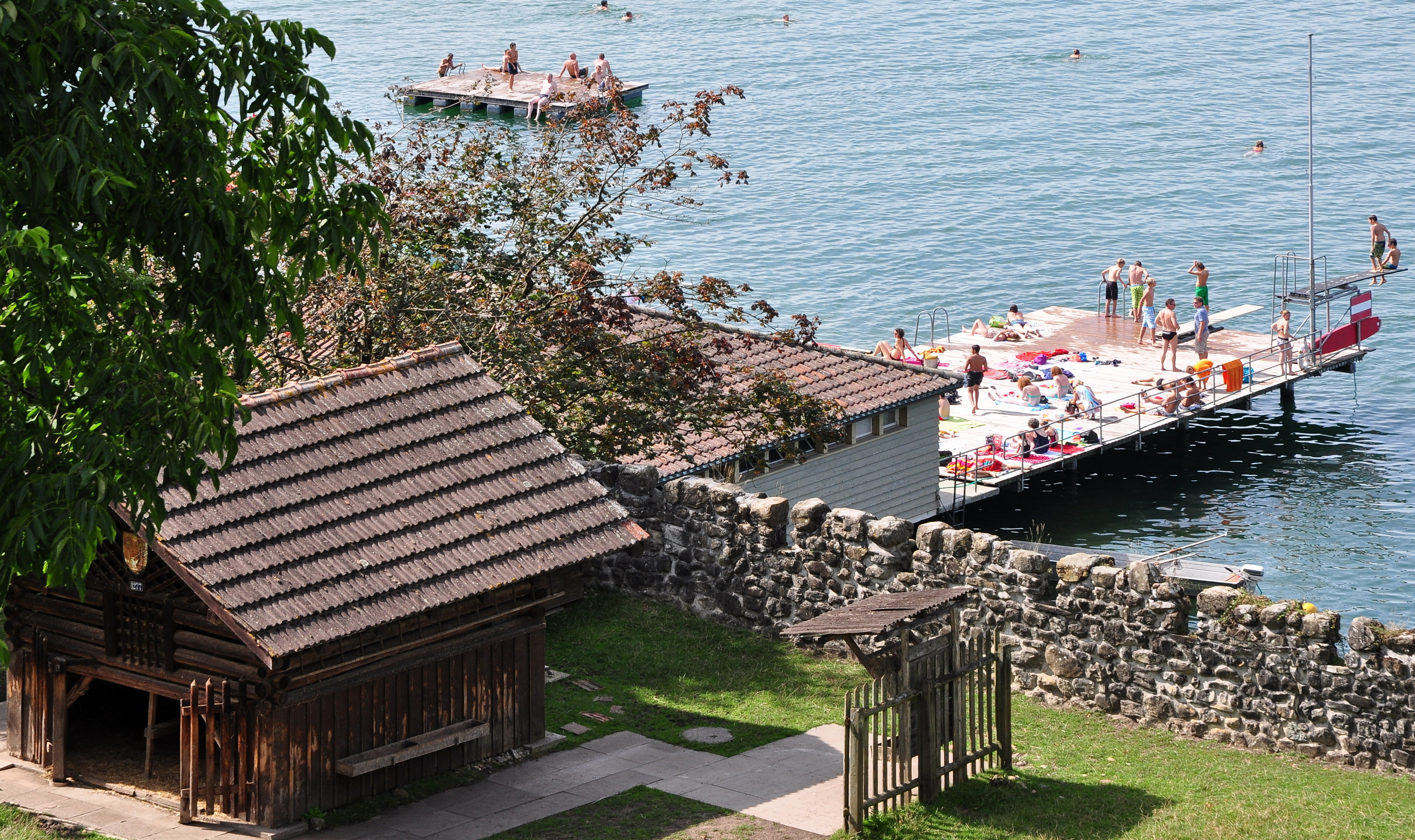
Lido and historic stable of the Deer park

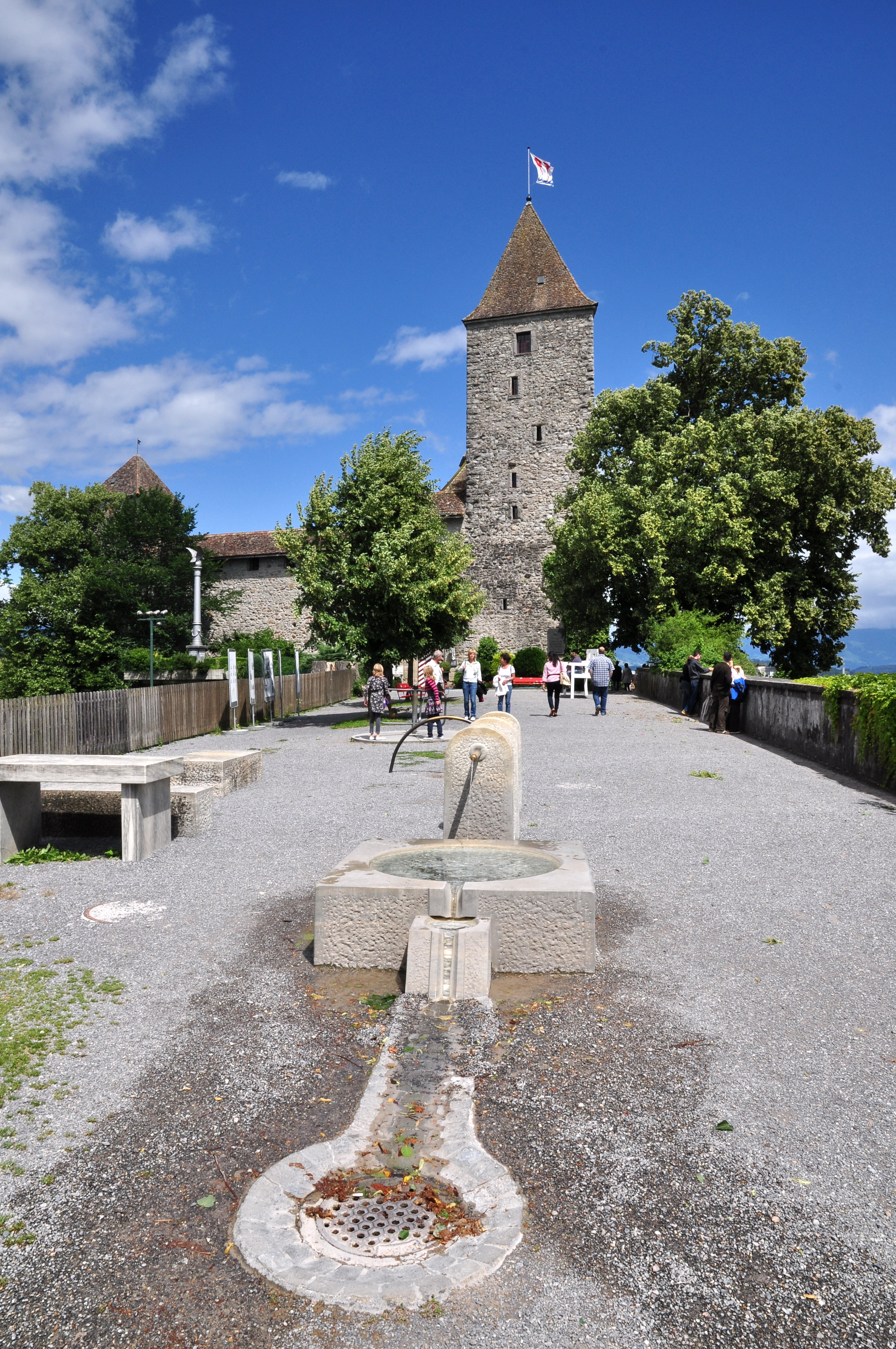
Lindenhof tophill area

== Geography ==
Lindenhof hill (its eastern part is called Herrenberg) dominates the old city of Rapperswil, a locality of the municipality of Rapperswil-Jona in the canton of St. Gallen in Switzerland. Being a moraine remain of the last Glacial period in Switzerland, the area was created as a rocky conglomerate about 20,000 years ago. Its northwestern slope towards the bay of Kempraten on Zürichsee lakeshore is named Schlosshalde, and Schlosshügel, the opposite side of the longish hill, is dominated by the vineyard of that name and Rapperswil's 'official' rose garden towards the harbour area respectively Seedamm and Obersee lakeshore. In all, the around 590 metres (1,936 ft) long and about 150 metres (492 ft) wide hill, is surrounded on three sides by water, and rises about 30 metres (98 ft) above lakeshore level; just the small eastern Herrenberg area is connected with the landside Altstadt und 19th-century extensions of the city of Rapperswil. Endingerhorn is the name of the western side of the longish mountain where the monastery is situated.

In the south, just a few dozens meters away, at the landing gate of the Zürichsee-Schifffahrtsgesellschaft (ZSG) operate passenger vessels on the lake towards Zürich, and the nearby situated Rapperswil railway station is a nodal point of the Südostbahn (SOB) and S-Bahn Zürich railway operators.

== Points of interest ==
Lindenhof (literally: Tilia court) is named after the Tilia trees planted there probably in the 13th century AD by the House of Rapperswil. As of today, it is a public square, a park respectively an arboretum and a playground, known for its remarkable view over both parts of the lake: Zürichsee, Lützelau and Ufnau island, and Zimmerberg–Albis–Felsenegg–Uetliberg and Pfannenstiel towards Zürich, as well as Obersee and Buechberg, Speer–Chüemettler–Federispitz mountains towards the Glarus Alps, and also the Seedamm area and the reconstruction of the lake bridge towards Hurden–Frauenwinkel–Etzel (mountain). Around the hill, there leads the so-called Bühler-Allee and some small pathways on lakeshore, where the Rapperswil lido (Seebad) is also located.

At Schlosshügel the Deer park towards Kempratnerbucht is located, established in 1871; it houses usually between 10 and 20 Dama dama's. Endingen houses the early 17th-century Capuchine monastery, and the medieval fortifications. At the Schlossberg vineyard (first mentioned in 981 AD) and at the Einsiedlerhaus there are also the rose gardens situated. Hintergasse at the southernly base of the hill, is probably the oldest street in Rapperswil, and is flanked by medieval houses and estates, and further small private Rose gardens. Among other traditions, Eis-zwei-Geissebei is celebrated on Lindenhof, at the Rathaus and Castle when in the evening all regional Guggenmusik (carnival marching bands) gather to celebrate a roaring concert.

The Rapperswil Castle, built in the early 13th century by Rudolf II and Rudolf II von Rapperswil, houses the Polenmuseum and the Poland memorial column. Inside the castle's palais, there is located the Schloss Restaurant having a rather expensive cuisine, but there's yet no tourist shop, kiosk or snack bar. Just a few meters easterly of the three-cornered castle, the about 800 years old Stadtpfarrkirche (parish church) and its cemetery chapel named Liebfrauenkapelle (built in 1489) are situated at the Herrenberg street, as well as the Stadtmuseum Rapperswil-Jona, a former small castle, and later part of the 15th-century northeasterly town wall towards Engelplatz. The latter is the former late medieval bastion and the eastern end of the Lindenhof hill and Rapperswil's historical core.

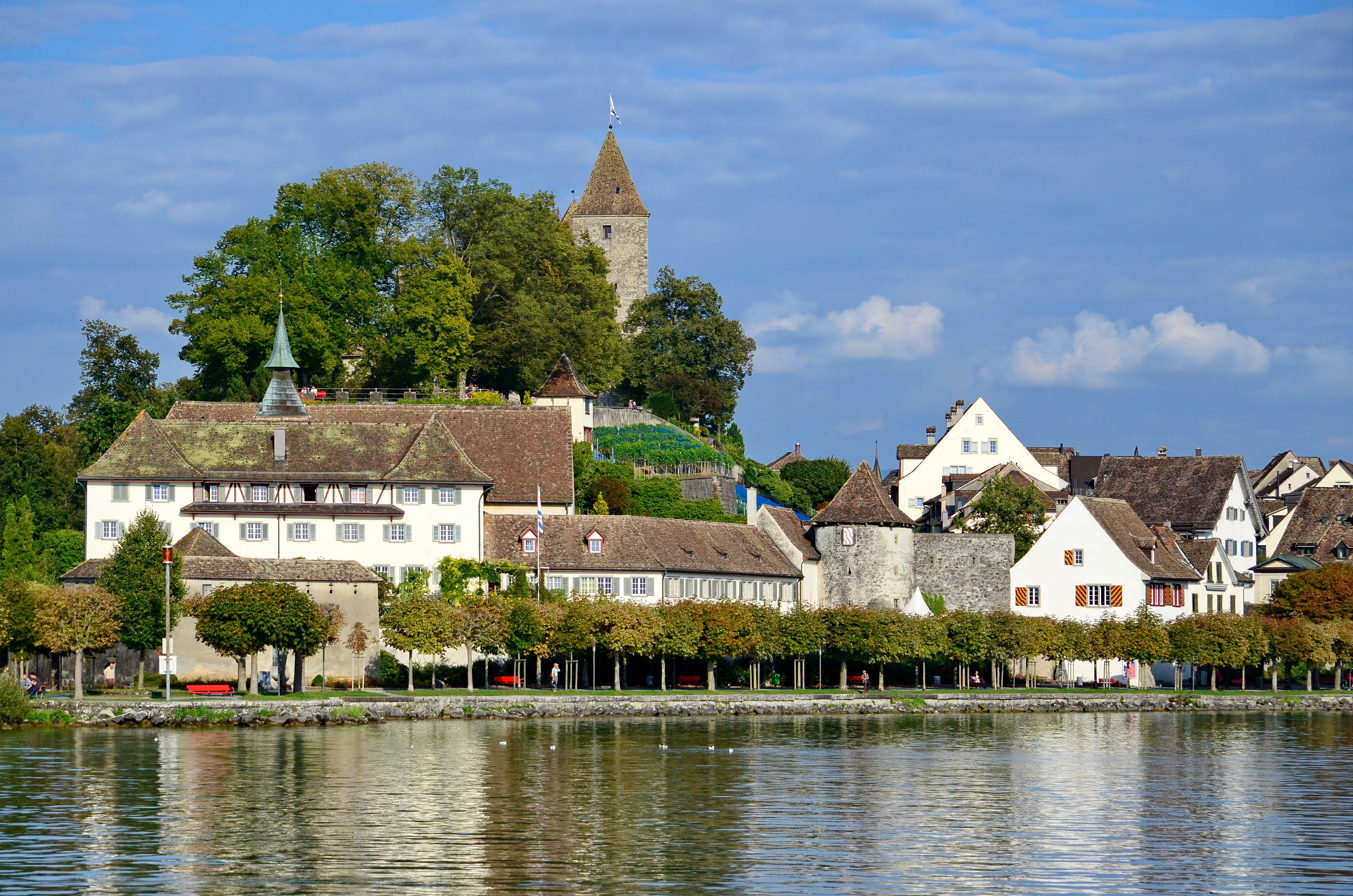
Endingerhorn fortification and medieval town hall at the Einsiedlerhaus building, as seen from ZSG paddle steamer Stadt Rapperswil

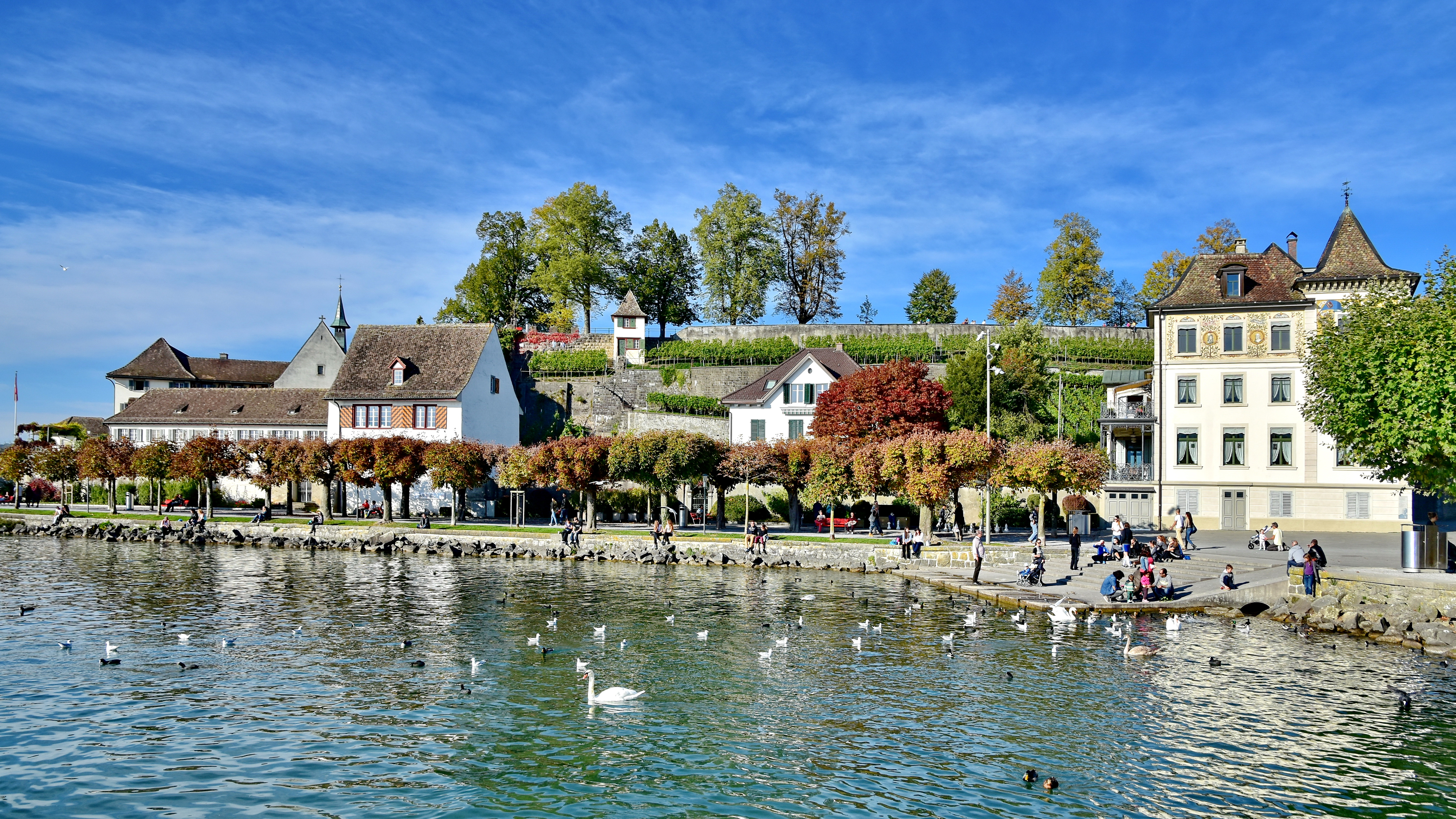

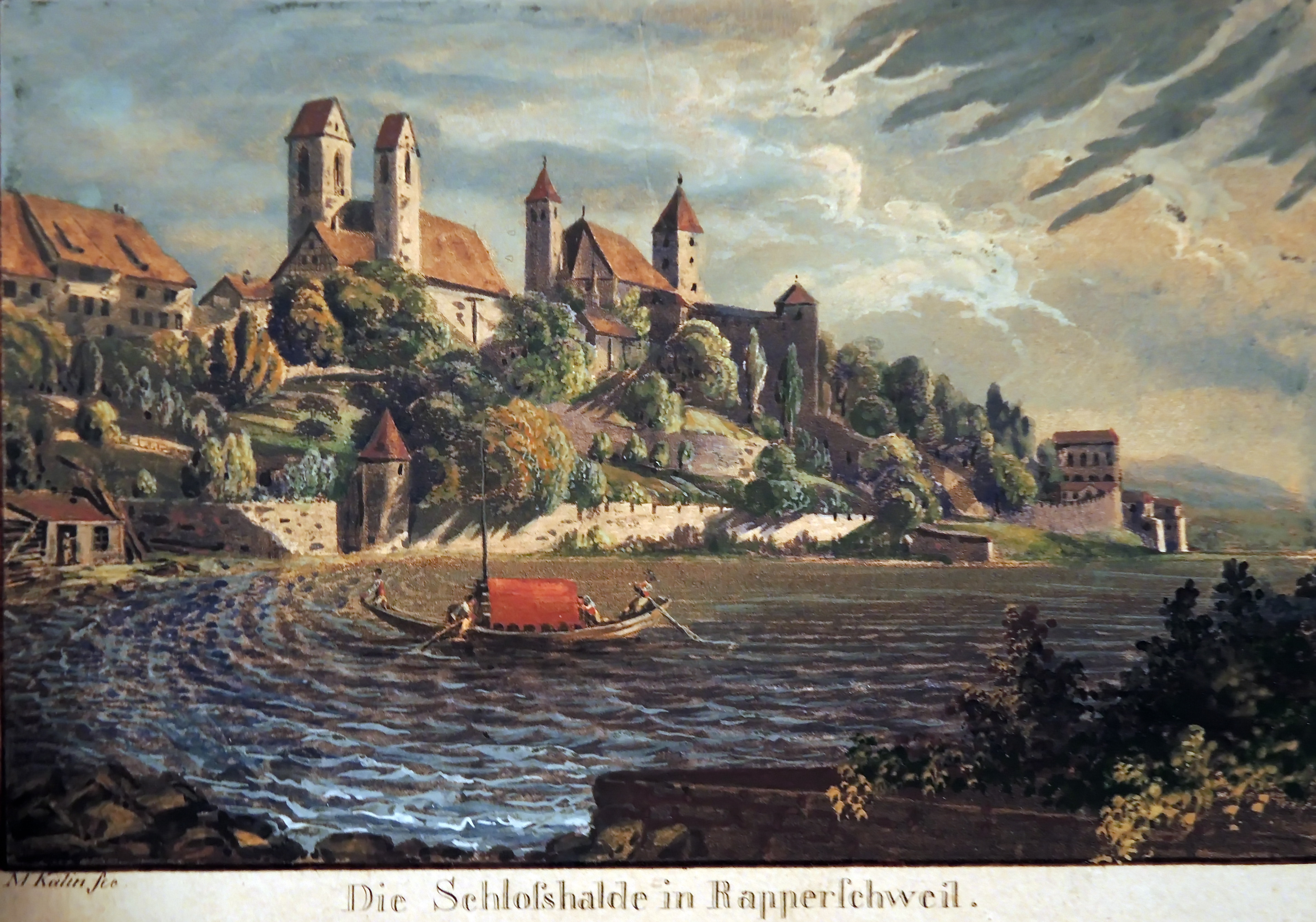
Schlosshalde around 1825 AD, aquatinta by Meinrad Kälin

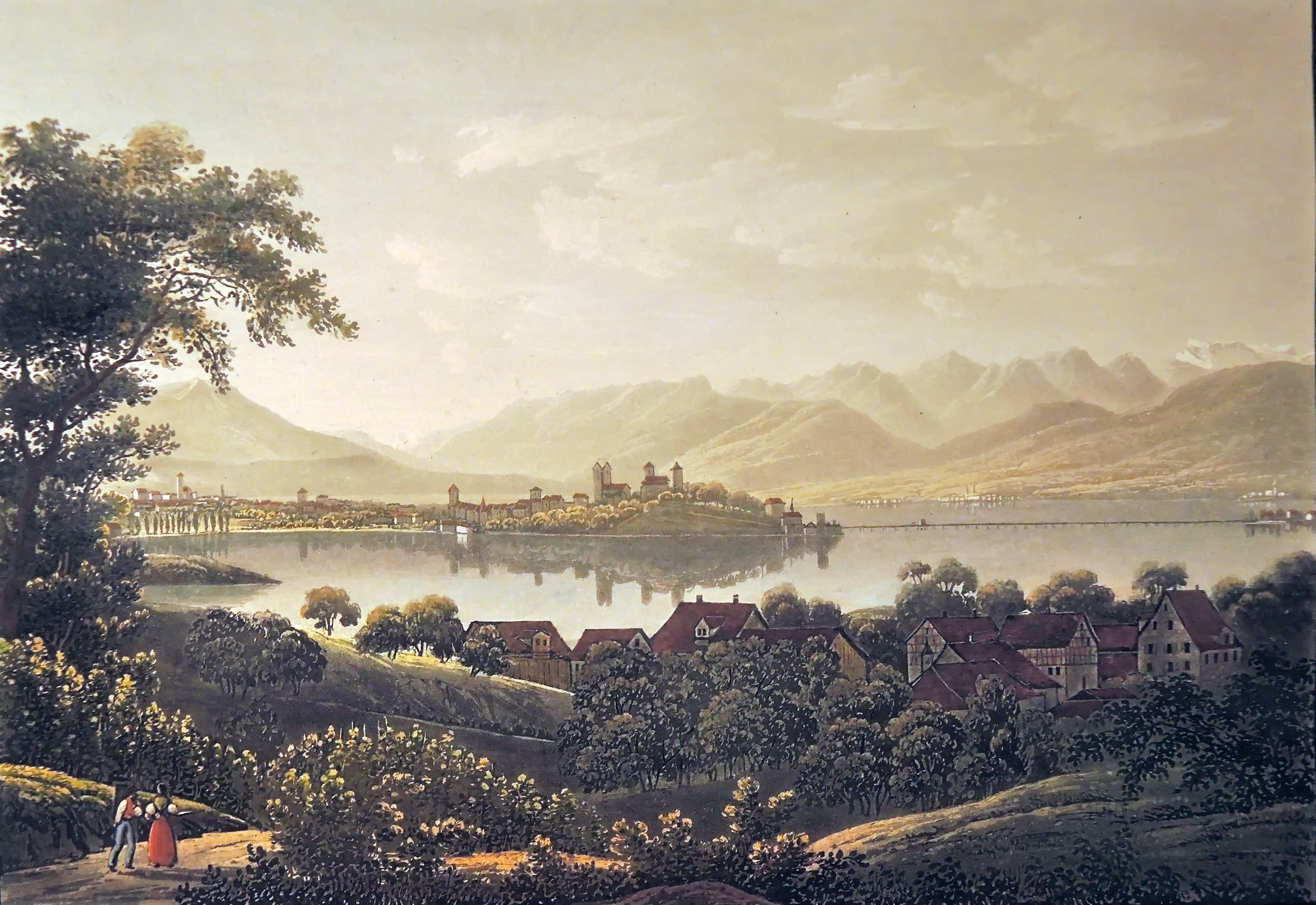
Aquatinta around 1840

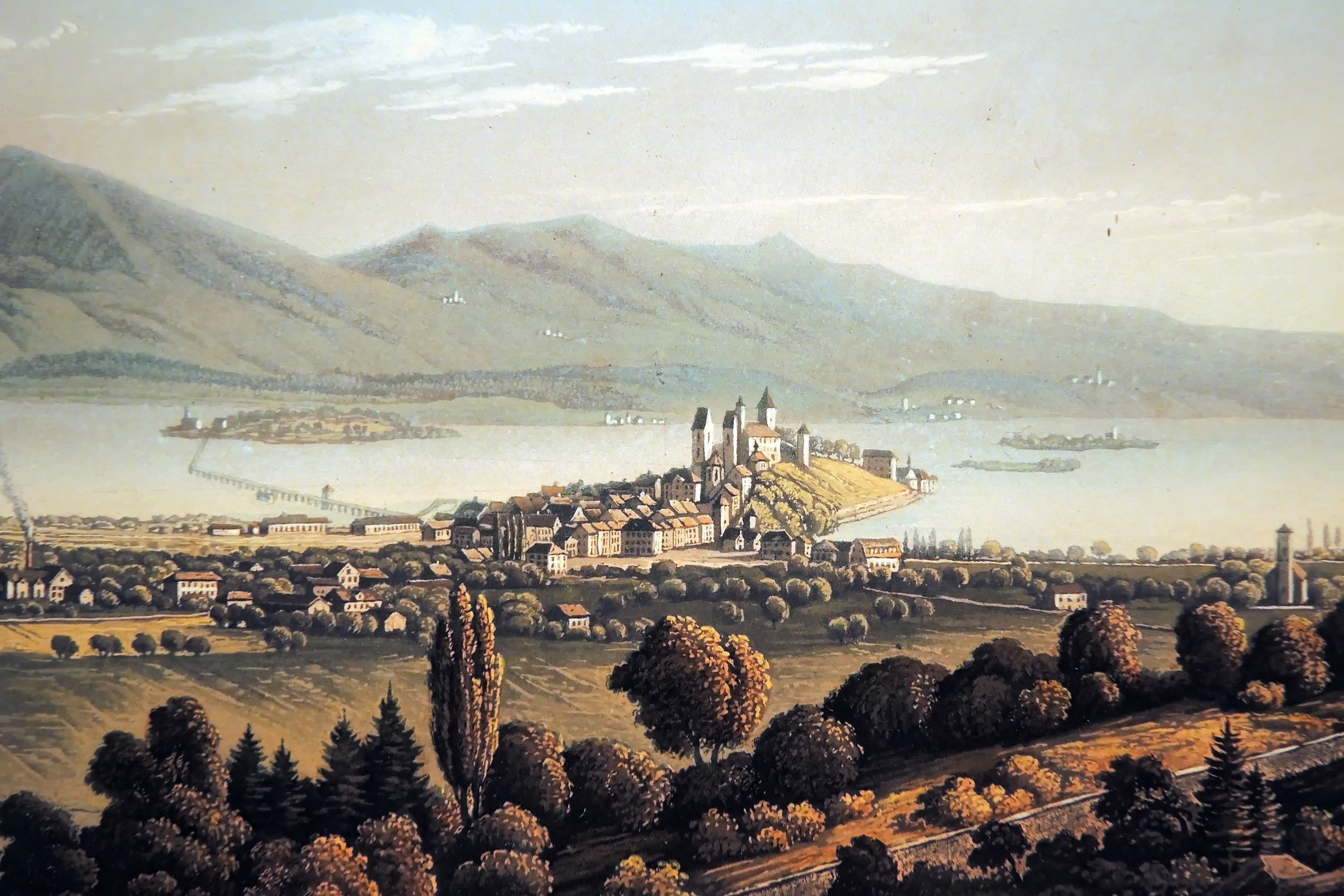
Rapperswil und Umgebung around 1835

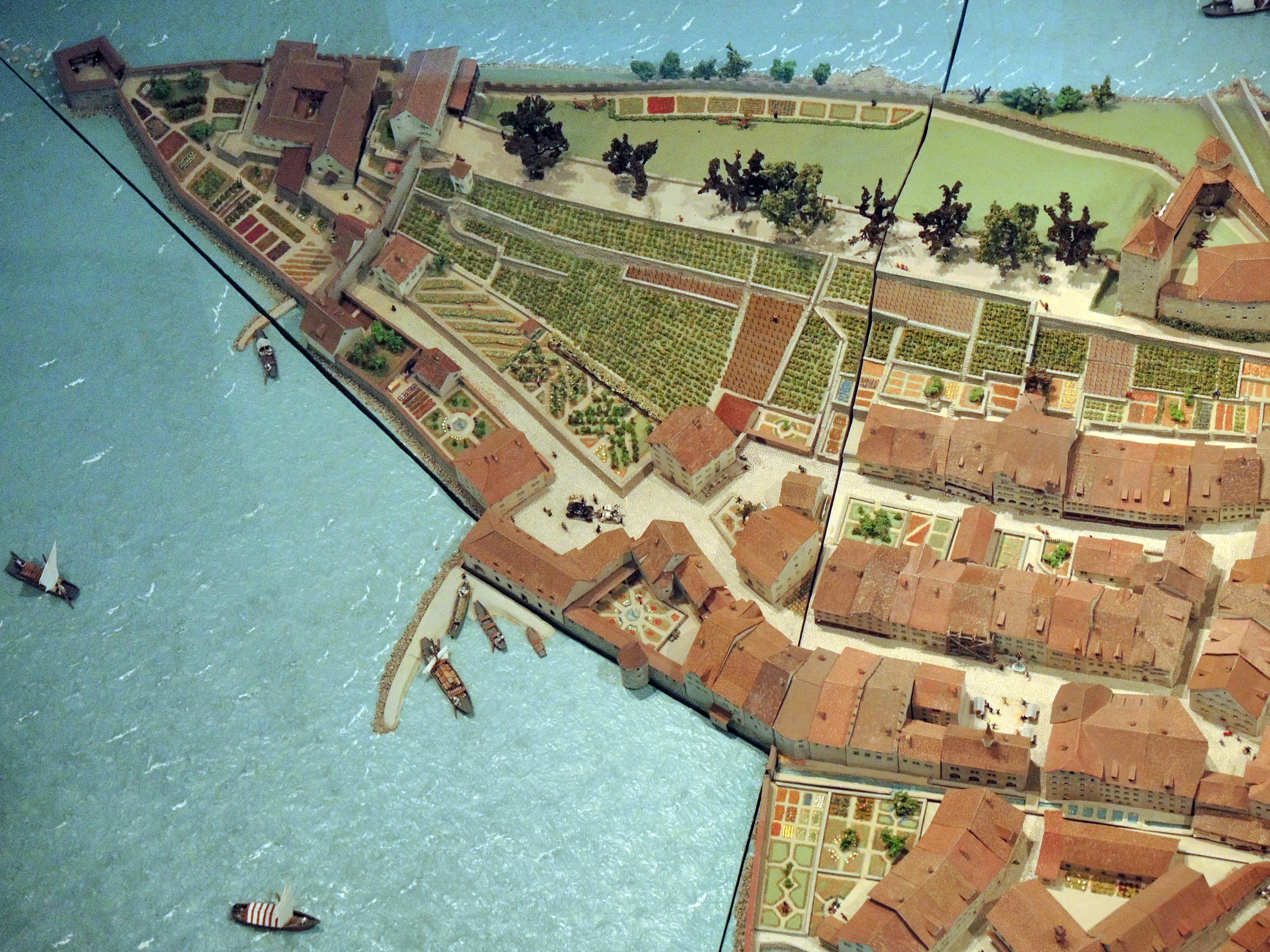
Scale model at the Stadtmuseum Rapperswil

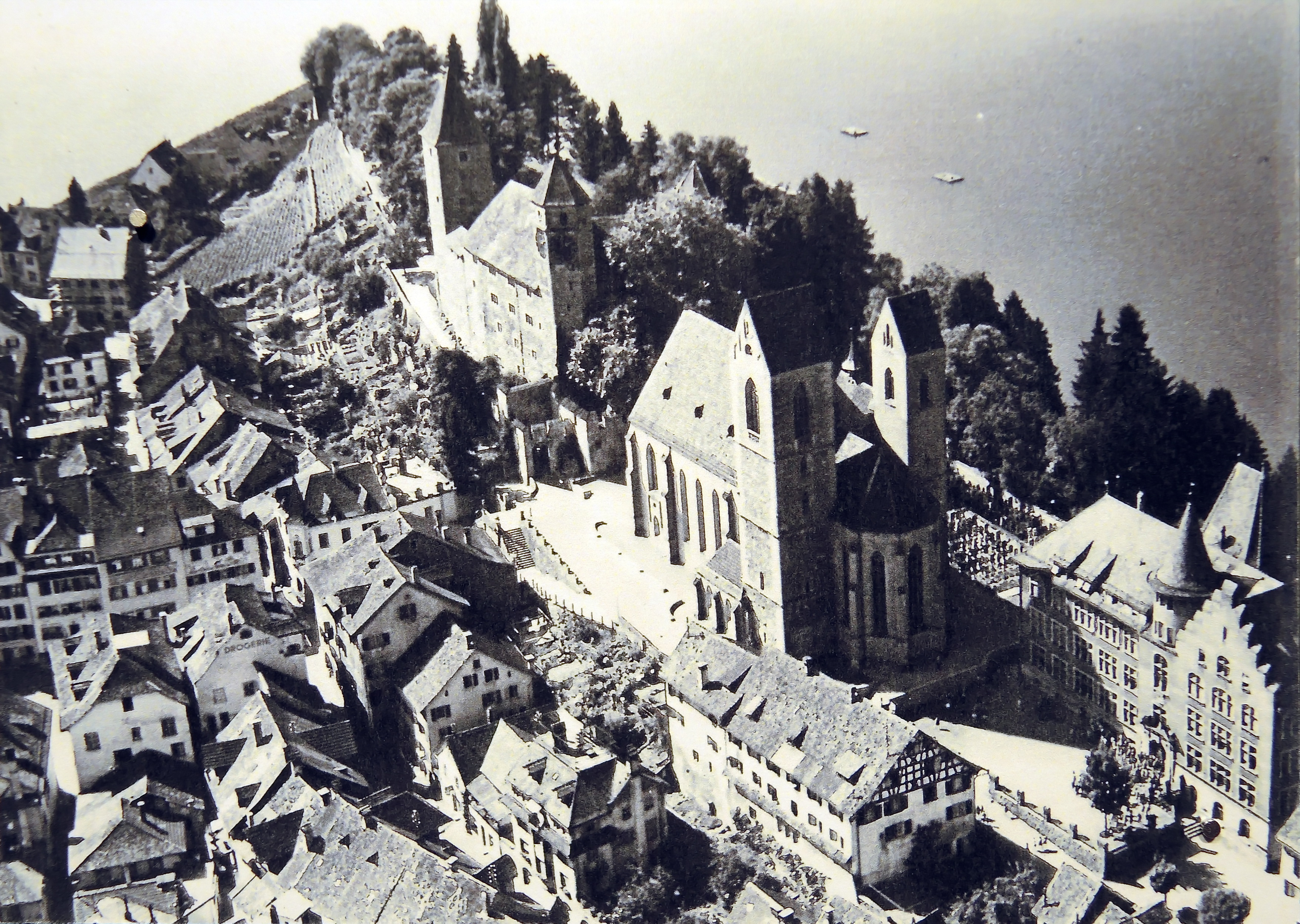
Lindenhof and Herrenberg area in 1919, aerial photograph by Walter Mittelholzer

== Protection ==
The hillside area is as part of the castle and the museum listed in the Swiss inventory of cultural property of national and regional significance as Class A object of national importance.

== Renewal ==
In June 2012 the citizens of Rapperswil (Bürgerversammlung) voted to re-design the tophill Lindenhof area, but the proposal was too extensive, so a stripped-down variant was accepted in December, reducing the costs down from 1 million to 380,000 Swiss Francs. Some of the old trees had been cut down in winter 2010/2011 as they were fungal infestated; instead of two rows of trees there was one realized, and in addition, the rose bushes at the castle were preserved. Lindenhof remained an open area, and the slopes got shady promenades thanks to new plantings. The historic metal railing at the viewing platforms were retained and supplemented with fall protection as they no longer met the safety requirements; the project was managed by Hager & Partner. The Deer park also was remodeled, and the mammals got a rebuilt stable and more space for retreats.

== Literature ==
- Peter Röllin: Kulturbaukasten Rapperswil-Jona: 36 Museen ohne Dach. Rapperswil-Jona 2005, ISBN 3-033-00478-4.
- Gerold Späth: Stilles Gelände am See. Suhrkamp, Berlin 1991.
