= Rapperswil (disambiguation) =

Rapperswil is a town in the municipality of Rapperswil-Jona, Switzerland.

Rapperswil may refer to:

- Rapperswil-Jona, a municipality in the Wahlkreis of See-Gaster in the canton of St. Gallen in Switzerland
  - Rapperswil Castle, a castle in Rapperswil
  - Paddle steamer Stadt Rapperswil, a paddle steamship of the Zürichsee-Schifffahrtsgesellschaft (ZSG) named after the town of Rapperswil
  - Rapperswil railway station, the central railway station of Rapperswil-Jona
- House of Rapperswil, the noble medieval Swiss family of that name
  - Elisabeth von Rapperswil (around 1251 or 1261 – † 1309 probably in Rapperswil), last Countess of the House of Rapperswil
  - Johann I von Laufenburg-Rapperswil, son of Elisabeth von Rapperswil
  - Johann II von Laufenburg-Rapperswil, son of Johann I
- Rapperswil, Berne, a municipality in Aarberg District in the canton of Bern in Switzerland

== See also ==
- Raperswilen, canton of Thurgau, Switzerland
- Rapperswill, Edmonton, neighbourhood in Edmonton, Canada
- Rupperswil, canton of Aargau, Switzerland
