= Rapperswil Peninsula =

Peninsula in Rapperswil on the northeastern Lake Zürich shore in Switzerland

Coordinates: 47°13′37″N 8°48′51″E

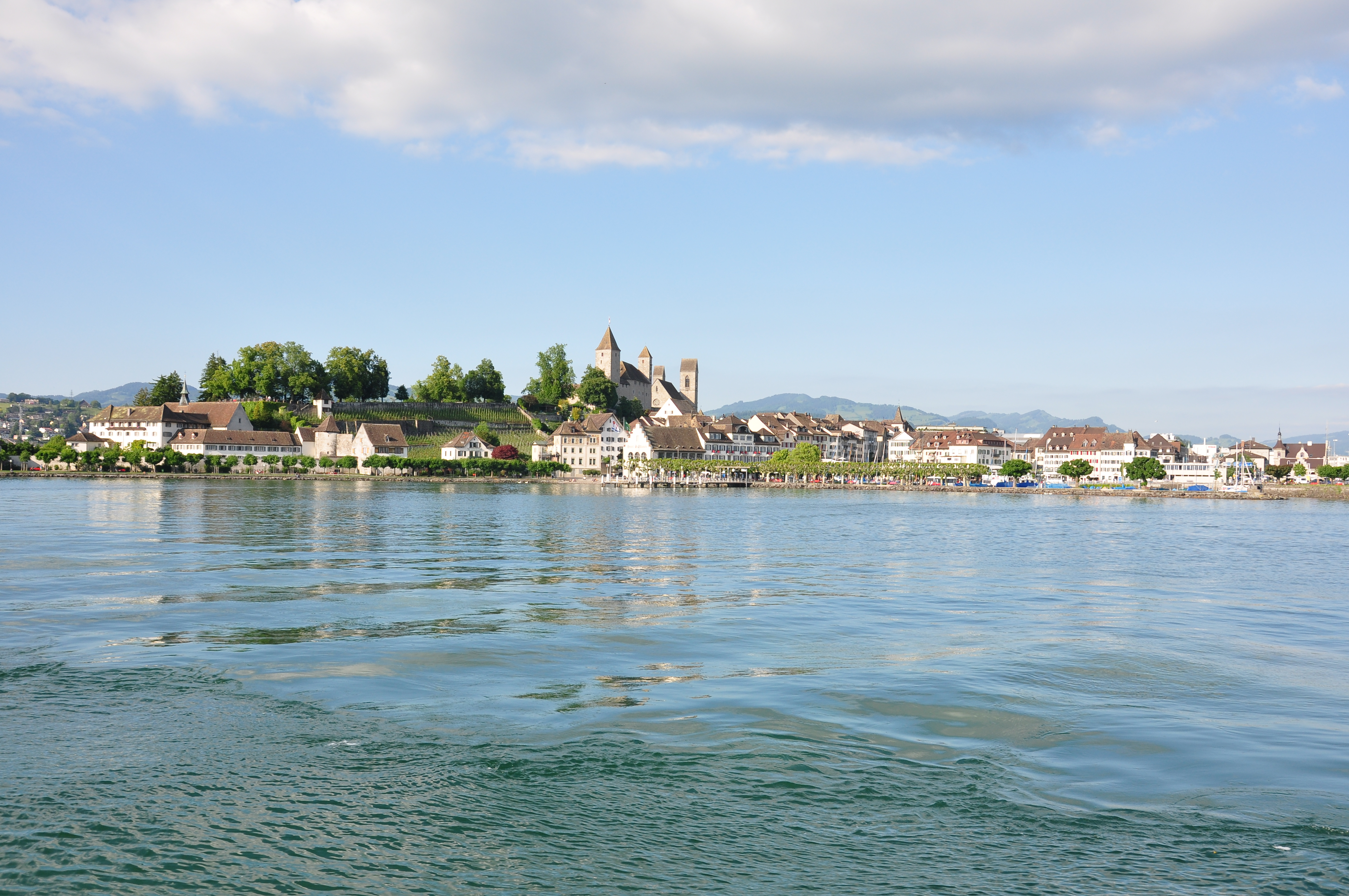
Rapperswil and the peninsula area, called Endingen and Lindenhof, as seen from ZSG motorship Panta Rhei (February 2010)

The Rapperswil Peninsula is a peninsula in Rapperswil-Jona (canton of St. Gallen, Switzerland) in Lake Zurich. To the northwest, the Kempratnerbucht (lit. 'Bay of Kempraten') is situated. To the south, the Seedamm causeway and the Holzbrücke Rapperswil-Hurden link the opposite shores of Lake Zurich and the Obersee (upper Lake Zurich), respectively.

Kapuzinerkloster Rapperswil (Capuchin monastery), Rapperswil Castle and partially the Altstadt of the city of Rapperswil are located on this rocky peninsula. In Swiss Standard German, it is called Endingen on its western lower side, Lindenhof on its western hilltop, and Herrenberg on its eastern hilltop.

Although it is a peninsula, neither the name "Rapperswil Peninsula" nor the corresponding German terms Rapperswiler Halbinsel or Halbinsel von Rapperswil are commonly used.

== See also ==
- List of peninsulas
