= Elisabeth von Rapperswil =

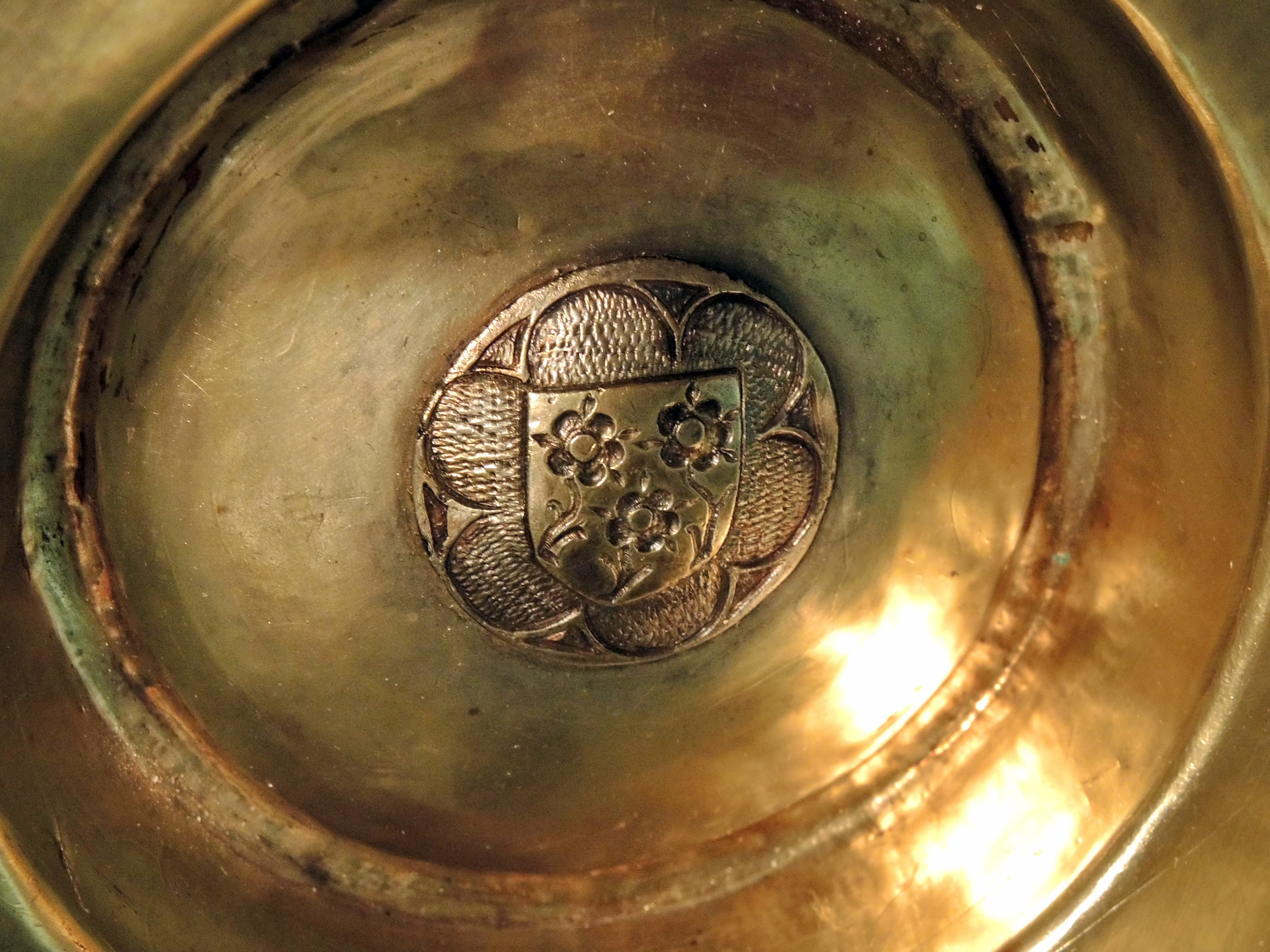
- Coats of arms, hydration shell of Countess Elisabeth, after 1300, Stadtmuseum Rapperswil
- Born: c. 1261
- Died: 10 April 1309 (aged 47–48); Rapperswil
- Other names: Habsburg-Laufenburg, Elisabeth von; Homberg, Elisabeth von
- Occupation: Countess of Grafschaft Rapperswil
- Years active: 1289–1309
- Known for: Benefactress of the Rüti Abbey and the Oetenbach Nunnery and last Countess of the House of Rapperswil
- Children: Cecilia and Wernher von Homberg by first marriage; Johann I, Rudolf, Ludwig and Clara by second marriage

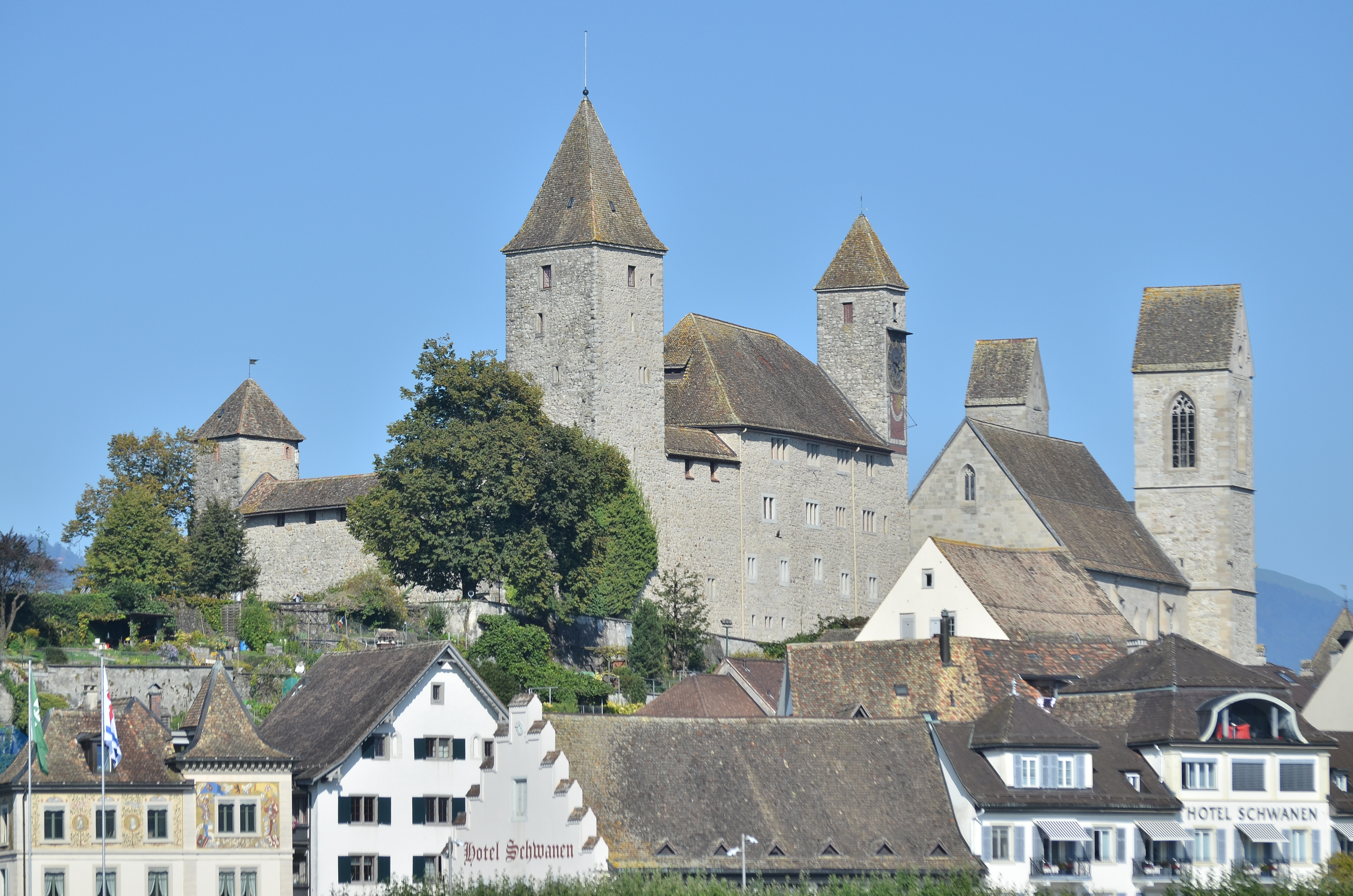
Rapperswil Castle and Stadtpfarrkirche Rapperswil, residence and parish church of Elisabeth von Rapperswil

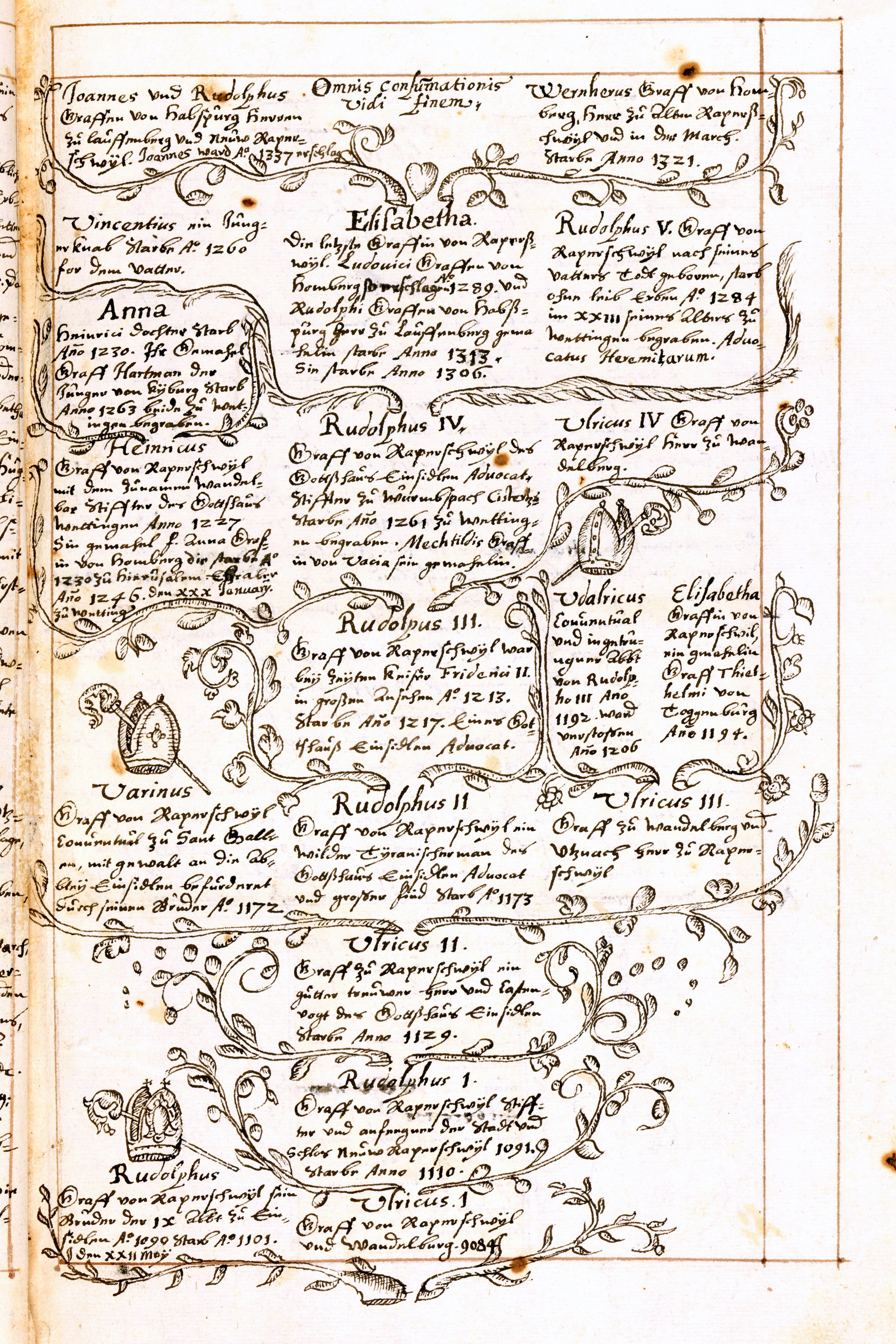
Family tree of Elisabeth von Rapperswil according to Heinrich Murer: B[eatae] Mariae Virg[inis] Marisstella, alias Wettingen, Frauenfeld, Kantonsbibliothek Thurgau, Y 115, around 1631.

Elisabeth von Rapperswil (also von Habsburg-Laufenburg, von Homberg; c.1251/1261 – 1309) was the last countess of the House of Rapperswil, and secured by her second marriage the female line of the Counts of Rapperswil and the extensive possessions of Rapperswil in the former Zürichgau to the Laufenburg line. Her son by first marriage was Reichsvogt Wernher von Homberg, and her oldest son by second marriage was Count Johann von Habsburg-Laufenburg who passed over the title of the count of Rapperswil to his oldest son Johann II and his brothers Rudolf and Gotfried.

== Early life ==
Elisabeth von Rapperswil was born around 1251 or rather around 1261 AD presumably in the Rapperswil Castle in the medieval city of Rapperswil as the daughter of Mechthild von Neifen (d. 1267) and Rudolf III von Vaz (b. around 1230; d. 27 July 1262) whose mother Adelheid was a member of the House of Rapperswil. Rudolf called himself Count Rudolf IV von Rapperswil when the former count of the same name, Rudolf III von Rapperswil died in 1255. The noble pair had three children: Vincent died around 1260 at the age of three, Rudolf V (b. 1265; d. 15 January 1283) and Elisabeth.

Sealed in a document by her father at the Rapperswil Castle on 10 January 1261, Rudolf confirmed that all fiefdom given by the Einsiedeln Abbey outside Etzel, meaning beyond the mountain of the same name beginning on Obersee (Zürichsee) lake shore, descended to his daughter Elisabeth, the other lands to his wife Mechthild, excluded some feuds which namely were mentioned.

Elisabeth married Count Ludwig von Homberg (d. 27 April 1289) around 1276, concluded from a document dated 1 May 1276 that Rudolf von Rapperswil (probably Elisabeth's brother) granted the income of the pastor of the Spital Rapperswil that was given by her father. The document was sealed by Ludwig von Homberg, Elisabeth and an attestor. Their son, Wernher von Homberg (b. 1284; d. 21 March 1320 in Genoa) was between 1309 and 1320 Reichsvogt of the Old Swiss Confederacy, and their daughter Cecilia von Homberg (b. probably before 1289; d. after 1320) became the abbess of the Oetenbach Nunnery.

== Countess of Rapperswil ==
Ludwig von Homberg was killed in the battle of Schlosshalde in 1289, and Elisabeth, now Countess of the Grafschaft Rapperswil, was forced to sell in 1290 all their rights and possessions, which the house had in Uri, to the Wettingen Abbey. On 28 November 1291 Countess Elizabeth concluded a three-year alliance with the city of Zürich against the Dukes of Austria-Habsburg. Countess Elisabeth was like her mother and father before, an ally of the city of Zürich, had the citizenship (Burgrecht) of Zürich, and she was patron of the Oetenbach Nunnery situated there: Elisabeth's daughter Cecilia von Homberg was the prioress of the nunnery, promoted its further development, and her brother Wernher donated the Our Lady Chapel in 1320.

From Elisabeth's second marriage to Count Rudolf of Habsburg-Laufenburg (d. 1315) in spring 1296, Johann I von Habsburg-Laufenburg, and probably by second marriage, Rudolf, Ludwig and Clara were born.

Countess Elisabeth of Rapperswil seems to influenced decisively the fortunes of the county Rapperswil, and to have largely steered between 1289 and 1309. The male line of the family of Rapperswil ended in 1283 with the death of Rudolf V, the underaged brother of Elisabeth. After his death, king Rudolf I of Habsburg handed over the fiefdom of Rapperswil to the St. Gallen Abbey. The archives of the Einsiedeln Abbey explained in the books of the professed abbots (Professbuch der Äbte) these serious change in the balance of power of the Zürichgau; below some passages to the person of the Countess Elisabeth:

As [Count Rudolf IV] he had no male heir, the count wished to transfer his fief to his wife Mechtild [of Neifen] as Leibgeding, thenafter to his daughter Elisabeth ... The above-mentioned young Count of Rapperswil [Rudolf V] already died 15 January 1283, and his sister respectively her husband, Ludwig von Homberg, not entforced to the fief, the abbot transferred the fief to his own brother, Rudolf von Güttingen. But king Rudolf [von Habsburg] did not agree, because the acquisition of these bailiwick fit excellently to his plans ... When Count Ludwig von Homberg on 27 April 1289 died, Elisabeth got back Pfäffikon and Wollerau [so-called Höfe district] ... The remaining farms and the bailiwick but remained at the Dukes of Austria ... Pope Nicholas IV confirmed on 23 August 1290 the freedoms and immunities of the pen ... The Countess Elisabeth von Rapperswil-Homberg laid claims to the courts in Brütten and Finstersee, but renounced on 29 November 1293 on their claims ...

So Rudolf I of Habsburg got in the possession of the bailiwick over the valley called Urseren, which controlled the strategical most important Gotthard Pass, and he also acted as Vogt of the Einsiedeln Abbey, rights held by the House of Rapperswil for centuries. In 1286, for financial reasons, the Countess Elisabeth had to sell her personal farm estate in Oberdürnten including the associated rights (in particular the lower courts) to the Rüti Abbey. In 1290 she sold the remaining property in Uri. Thus, Elisabeth joined forces in 1291 with the city of Zürich, probably directed against the main line of Rudolf of Habsburg-Austria. The Einsiedeln archives mention Elisabeth again, in connection with the transfer of the advocacies on Pfäffikon and in connection with the Kastvogtei about the Einsiedeln Abbey

... The advocacy of Pfäffikon etc were Johann Abt 1296 from Countess Elisabeth of Rapperswil, resulting in a second marriage with Rudolf III, had married von Habsburg-Laufenburg. But her son from her first marriage, Wernher von Homberg, a part thereof; this pledged Habsburg-Austria in 1319 and the advocacy of Einsiedeln; later all fief went accordance with the contract of Habsburg-Laufenburg ...

As sovereign, Elisabeth von Rapperswil signed many documents, settled differences or legal affairs, or gave rights to settlements, among them on 7 January 1300 the pledge of the reign Greifensee to the knight Hermann II. von Landenberg. The pledge included the castle, the town and the lake of the same name, and a larger number of farms, along with supporting fields, meadows, forests and even the courtiers themselves. The corresponding lower and middle court rights and the pastoral rights (Kirchrecht) in Uster which were held for centuries by the Rapperswil family, were also pledged. To 1303 Elisabeth divided the county Rapperswil, so that the possession devolved on the left bank of Zürichsee went to the descendants of Ludwig von Homberg, while the possession of the right bank remained the family of the Habsburg-Laufenburg (Alt-Rapperswil) line, against the will of king Albrecht.

== Death, burial and memento ==
Elisabeth von Rapperswil died, probably on 10 April 1309 in the Rapperswil Castle, and may have been buried in the Wurmsbach nunnery (d.. Apr. IV. Idus: Elizabeth die Graffin, vnser Stiffterin. Excerpta ex Necromonast. Wurmspacensis) on Obersee lake shore. The graves of her younger brother Vinzenz and her mother were excavated in the nunnery, but Elisabeth's grave so far was not discovered.

On 24 February 1310 (Sexta Kal. Martii.) Graf Rudolf transferred to his parents, his late wife Elisabeth and his own salvation's sake, the patronage of the church in Dietikon with the presentation right in the chapels of Urdorf and Spreitenbach to the Wettingen Abbey in the Limmat Valley. On 23 March 1310 (X. Kal. April. Ind. Vili.) Gebhard, provost of Strassburg, authenticated as vicar in temporalibus of the Bishop Gerhard of Konstanz that Count Rudolf and Johann, his son, to enlarge the spiritual welfare of their ancestors and the wife Elisabeth, with his permission to grant to the church Jonen in Rapperswil, whose feudal law belongs to the Counts, a resident priest donated for Sundays and public holidays (benefice, in German: Pfründe). Sealed have Propst Gebhard, Count Rudolf, for himself and his son (who has no seal) and (at the request of the Counts) Abbot Joh. V. Einsiedeln and the mayor of the city Rapperswil.

== Aftermath ==
After the death of Count Rudolf von Habsburg-Laufenburg the inheritance of the Rapperswil possessions and rights went to Elisabeth's son Johann I (b. around 1295/97; d. 21 September 1337 in the battle of Grynau), then to his son, Johann II (b. around 1330; d. 1380) of Habsburg-Laufenburg. Johann I and his son Johann II supported the opposition, around 20 former council members of Zürich, against Rudolf Brun, since 1336 the self-style mayor of the city. An uprising in Zürich failed in 1350, and the city of Rapperswil and the Rapperswil and Altendorf castles of the House of Rapperswil were widely destroyed by Brun's troops. Count Johann II was arrested in Zürich for two years, and Johann and his younger brothers had to sell most of the remaining property to the Dukes of Austria to rebuild the ruins.

== See also ==
- House of Rapperswil
- Johann I (Habsburg-Laufenburg)
- Johann II (Habsburg-Laufenburg)

== Literature ==
- Erwin Eugster: Adlige Territorialpolitik in der Ostschweiz. Kirchliche Stiftungen im Spannungsfeld früher landesherrlicher Verdrängungspolitik. Zürich 1991, ISBN 3-90527-868-5.
- Roger Sablonier: Gründungszeit ohne Eidgenossen: Politik und Gesellschaft in der Innerschweiz um 1300. hier + jetzt, Baden 2008, ISBN 978-3-03919-085-0.
