= Johann I (Habsburg-Laufenburg) =

Johann I von Habsburg-Laufenburg
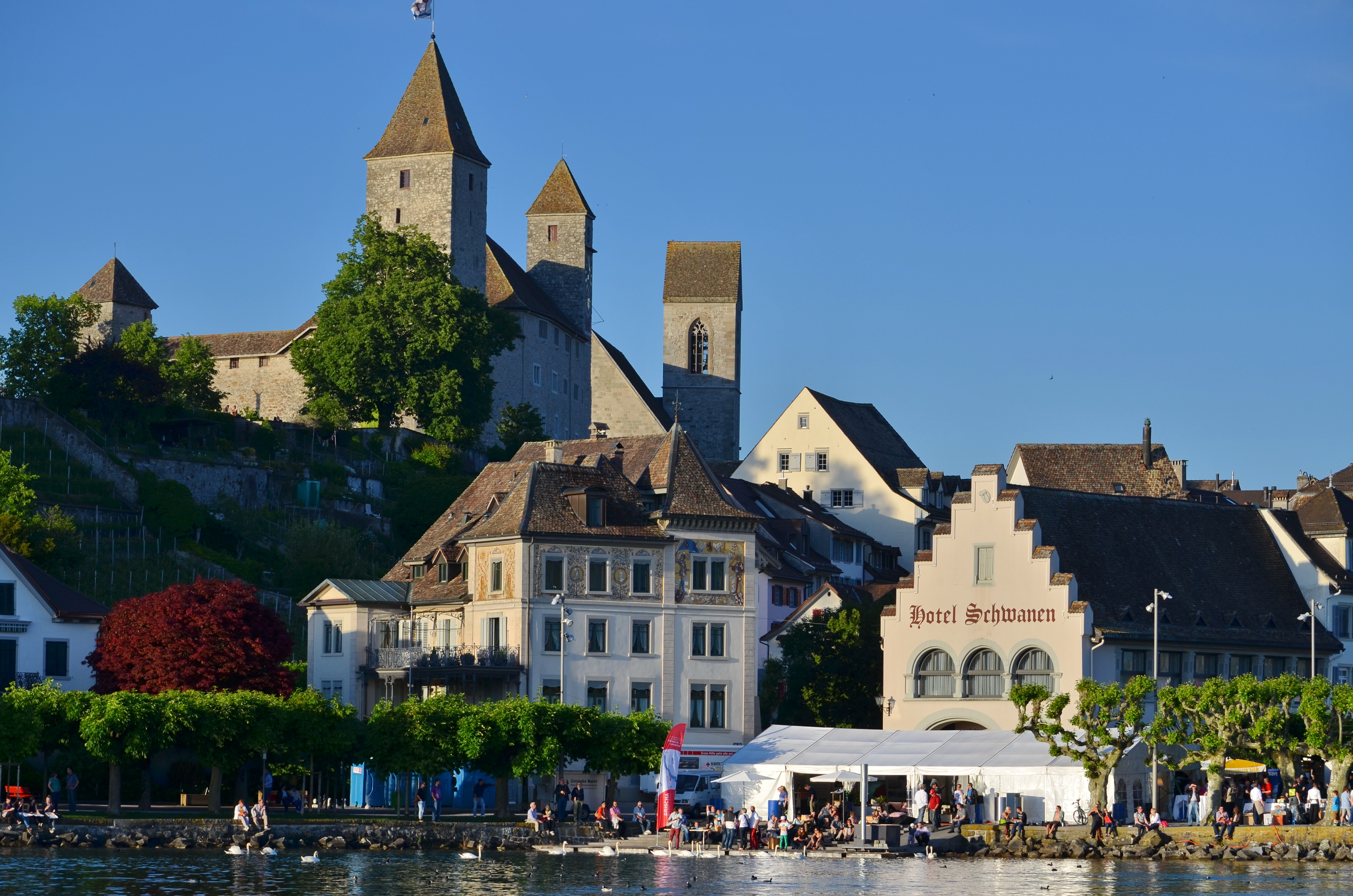
- Rapperswil and its Schloss on the Lindenhof hill
- Born: c. 1295/97 probably Rapperswil
- Died: 21 September 1337 (aged 40–41); Grynau
- Other names: Rapperswil-Laufenburg; Laufenburg-Rapperswil
- Occupation: Count of Grafschaft Rapperswil
- Years active: 1309–1337
- Known for: Son of Countess Elisabeth von Rapperswil and Count of Habsburg-Laufenburg respectively House of Rapperswil
- Spouse: Agnes von Werd-Erstein
- Children: Johann II, Gotfried, Rudolf and Agnes

Johann I von Habsburg-Laufenburg (also Johannes von Rapperswil-Laufenburg-Habsburg, von Laufenburg-Rapperswil; born around 1297; died 21 September 1337 in Grynau) was the Count of the House Habsburg-Laufenburg and later Count of the House of Rapperswil.

== Early life ==
Johann was born between 1295 and 1297 AD probably in the Rapperswil Castle in the medieval city of Rapperswil as the oldest son of Elisabeth Countess of Rapperswil († 1309) by second marriage with Count Rudolf von Habsburg-Laufenburg († 1315). Rudolf, Ludwig and Clara are mentioned as siblings of Johann, as well as his stepbrother Reichsvogt Wernher von Homberg and his stepsister Cecilia von Homberg who became the abbess of the Oetenbach Nunnery, born to Countess Elisabeth by first marriage with Count Ludwig von Homberg. Johann may be raised in Laufenburg and even educated at the royal Habsburg court, as well as his son Johann II († 1380) and those brothers Rudolf IV and Gotfrid II.

On 23 March 1310 (X. Kal. April. Ind. Vili.) Gebhard, provost of Strassburg, authenticated as vicar in temporalibus of the Bishop Gerhard of Konstanz that Count Rudolf and Johann, his son, to enlarge the spiritual welfare of their ancestors and the wife Elisabeth, with his permission to grant to the church Jonen in Rapperswil, whose feudal law belongs to the Counts, a resident priest donated for Sundays and public holidays (benefice, in German: Pfründe). Sealed have Propst Gebhard, Count Rudolf for himself and his son (who has no seal) and (at the request of the Counts) Abbot Joh. V. Einsiedeln and the mayor of the city Rapperswil.

== Count of Habsburg-Laufenburg-Rapperswil ==
Johann was married to Agnes von Werd († after 9 February 1354), daughter of Sigismund of Werd, landgrave of the Lower Alsace. Johann's mother, Countess Elisabeth died in 1309, and after the death of his father Rudolf III in 1314, Count Johann was Landgraf of the Unterklettgau bailiwick and Vogt of the Rheinau Abbey. In 1315 Count Johann renewed the municipal law of the city of Laufenburg. Agnes and Johann had four children: Johan(nnes), Gotfried (II), Ruldof (IV), and Agnes who became a nun at the Säckingen Abbey.

== Feud with the city of Zürich ==
On 18 July 1336, Rudolf Brun, mayor of the city of Zürich, defeated his political opponents, the former members of the Rat (council) of Zürich, of which around 12 members found refuge by count Johann in Rapperswil. In feud (German: Fehde), an approved tradition in medieval law, of the so-called Äusseres Zürich coalition of the Grafschaft Rapperswil, some knights and nobles which supported them, Count Johann became the leader of the opposition in the city of Zürich. Latter was supported among others by the House of Toggenburg as its military arm, as well by the Einsiedeln Abbey which supported Brun's regime.

The counselors hoped for support by Count Johann and offered probably in return the forgiveness of debt of the Herrschaft Rapperswil, as some sources hypothesize. Some, if not most of the refugees, were decades before their exile vassals of the Counts of Rapperswil, including the ancient councilors family Bilgeri those members lost six of their seats in the council of Zürich.

== Death on 21 September 1337 ==
Graf Diethelm von Toggenburg moved On 21 September 1337 with a fleet, numerous soldiers and siege material from Zürich over the Obersee to the Grynau Castle. The castle was at that time located at the confluence of the Linth river in the former Tuggenersee and served as a base of the "outer Zürich" (äusseres Zürich) alliance. Although they thereby passed the city of Rapperswil, the Zürich troops were convinced not to be bothered by the people of Rapperswil, due to their large number. Count Johann made the best of it and landed, hidden by the lakeshore Buechberg, silently his soldiers from Rapperswil crossing the lake. From the wooded eastern slope of the mountain, Johann raided the Zürich troops carelessly encamped; which headless fled to their ships, and Graf Diethelm was taken as prisoner. As the Zürich troops remarked that Graf Johann had just a handful of soldiers, they competed for the counterattack, attacked Johann's small squad, and Count Johann von Habsburg-Laufenburg found after valiant resistance the death. In the pain and wrath, his abiders cut down the captived [Count of] 'Toggenburg' in pieces.

== Aftermath ==
Count Johann's children – Johann II, the oldest of three sons, Rudolf and Gotfrid, and Agnes – were set under guardianship of Albrecht, Duke of Austria, sealed by a document between the city of Zürich and the German King respectively Duke Albrecht on 21 November 1337. The document included also a peace contract and regulations, and included among others: Johann's children got the documents related to their rights in Raprechtswile and their possessions in the March (Alt-Rapperswil) area. Furthermore, the document also included the Zürich councils (äussere Bürger) who refuged to Rapperswil and financial compensations by the former councils to Brun's entourage. These restrictions also included Johann I's children – the German king had to vouch for Brun's regime, Duke Albrecht for Rapperswil and the underage Rapperswils Counts.

After the death of Count Rudolf von Habsburg-Laufenburg the inheritance of the Rapperswil possessions and rights went to Countess Elisabeth's son Wernher von Homberg, thenafter to Johann I and to his son Johann II. As mentioned, Johann I and after those dead, his son Johann II supported the opposition of the former council members of Zürich against Rudolf Brun, since 1336 the self-style mayor of the city. An uprising in Zürich failed in 1350, and the city of Rapperswil and the remaining two castles of the House of Rapperswil were widely destroyed by Brun's troops. Count Johann II was arrested in Zürich for two years, and in 1352 he had to sell most of the remaining property to Albert II, Duke of Austria, a generous conveyor of the then city republic, to rebuild the ruins.

== See also ==
- Elisabeth von Rapperswil
- Johann II

== Literature ==
- Erwin Eugster: Adlige Territorialpolitik in der Ostschweiz. Kirchliche Stiftungen im Spannungsfeld früher landesherrlicher Verdrängungspolitik. Zürich 1991, ISBN 3-90527-868-5.
- Roger Sablonier: Gründungszeit ohne Eidgenossen: Politik und Gesellschaft in der Innerschweiz um 1300. hier + jetzt, Baden 2008, ISBN 978-3-03919-085-0.
