= Rapperswil Castle =

Castle in Switzerland

Schloss Rapperswil
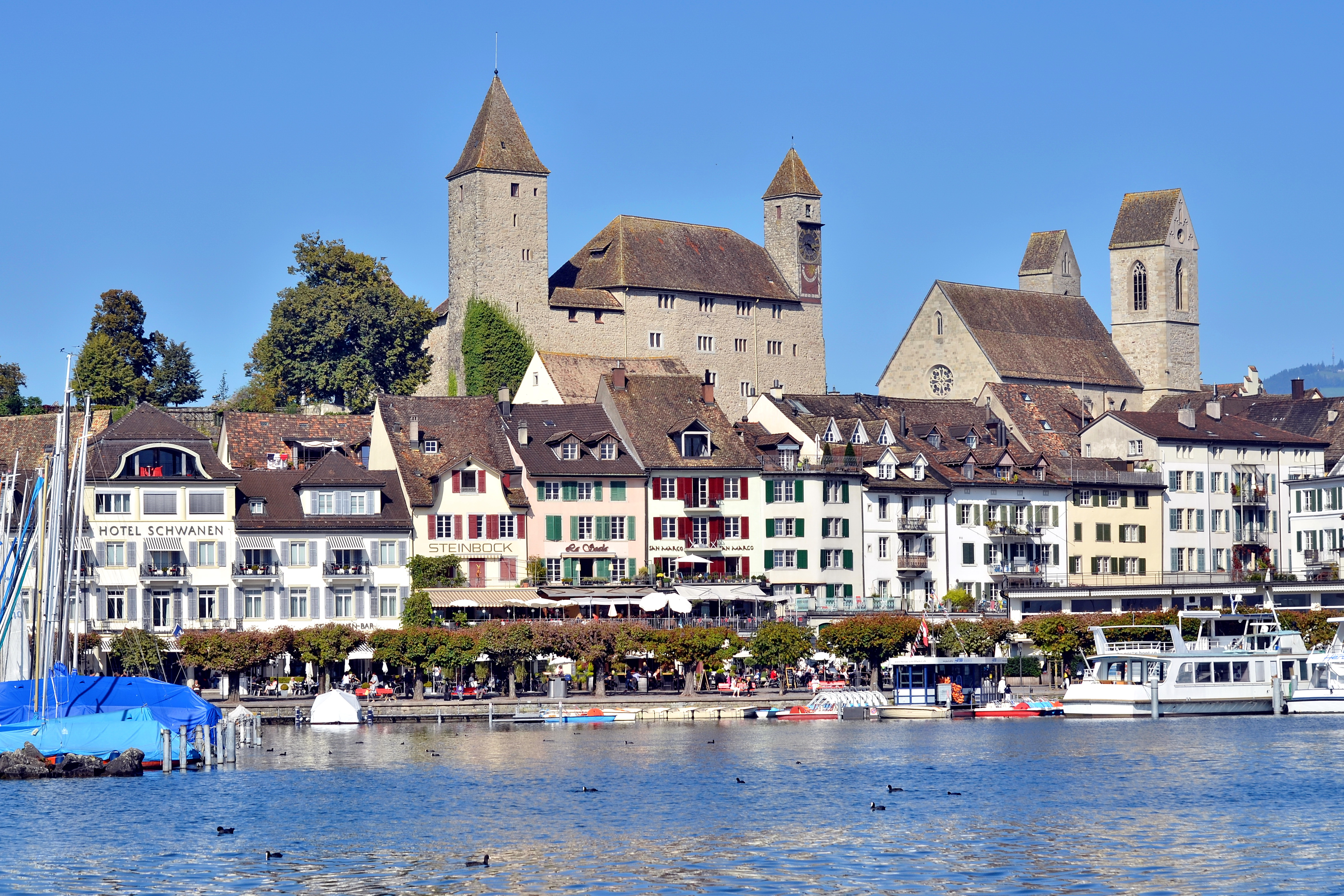
- Rapperswil harbour, as seen from Seedamm, Fischmarktplatz to the right, Rapperswil castle and Stadtpfarrkirche (St. John's Church) in the background (September 2014)

- Location within Canton of St. Gallen Rapperswil Castle (Switzerland)

General information
- Classification: Historic monument
- Location: Rapperswil, Switzerland
- Coordinates: 47.227337°N 8.815509°E
- Construction started: ~ 1220 respectively 1352
- Completed: ~ 1229 respectively 1354

Rapperswil Castle (Swiss German: Schloss Rapperswil) is a castle, built in the early 13th century by the House of Rapperswil, in the formerly independent city of Rapperswil.

The castle is located on the eastern Lake Zurich's western Obersee lakeshore in Rapperswil, a locality of the Rapperswil-Jona municipality in Switzerland's canton of St. Gallen.

Since 1870 the castle has been home to the Polish National Museum established by Polish émigrés, including the castle's lessee and restorer, Count Wladyslaw Broel-Plater. Schloss Rapperswil and the Museum are listed in the Swiss inventory of cultural property of national and regional significance as Class A objects of national importance.

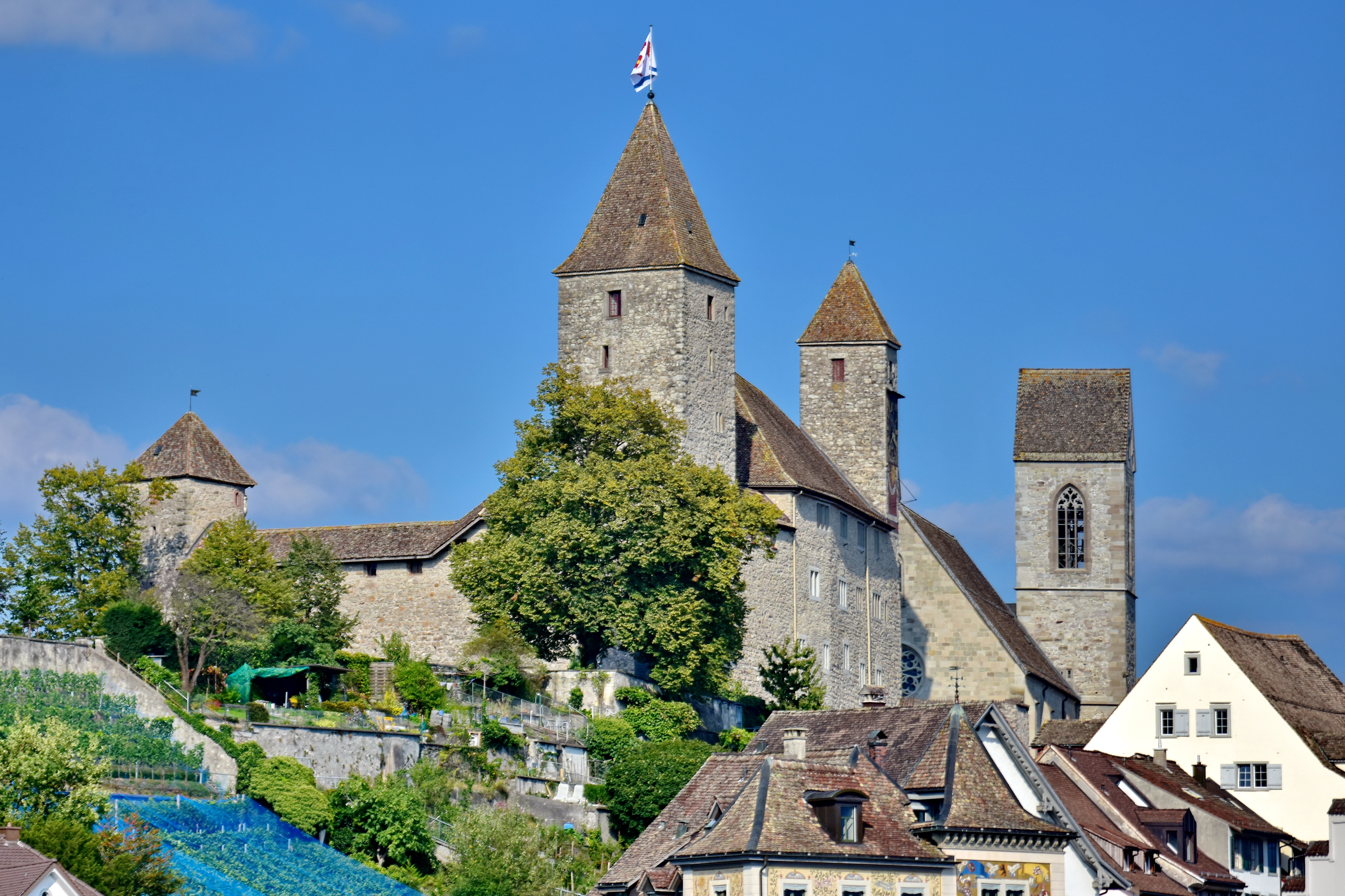
Rapperswil Castle as seen from the harbour area, St. John's Church in the background, the vineyards in the foreground

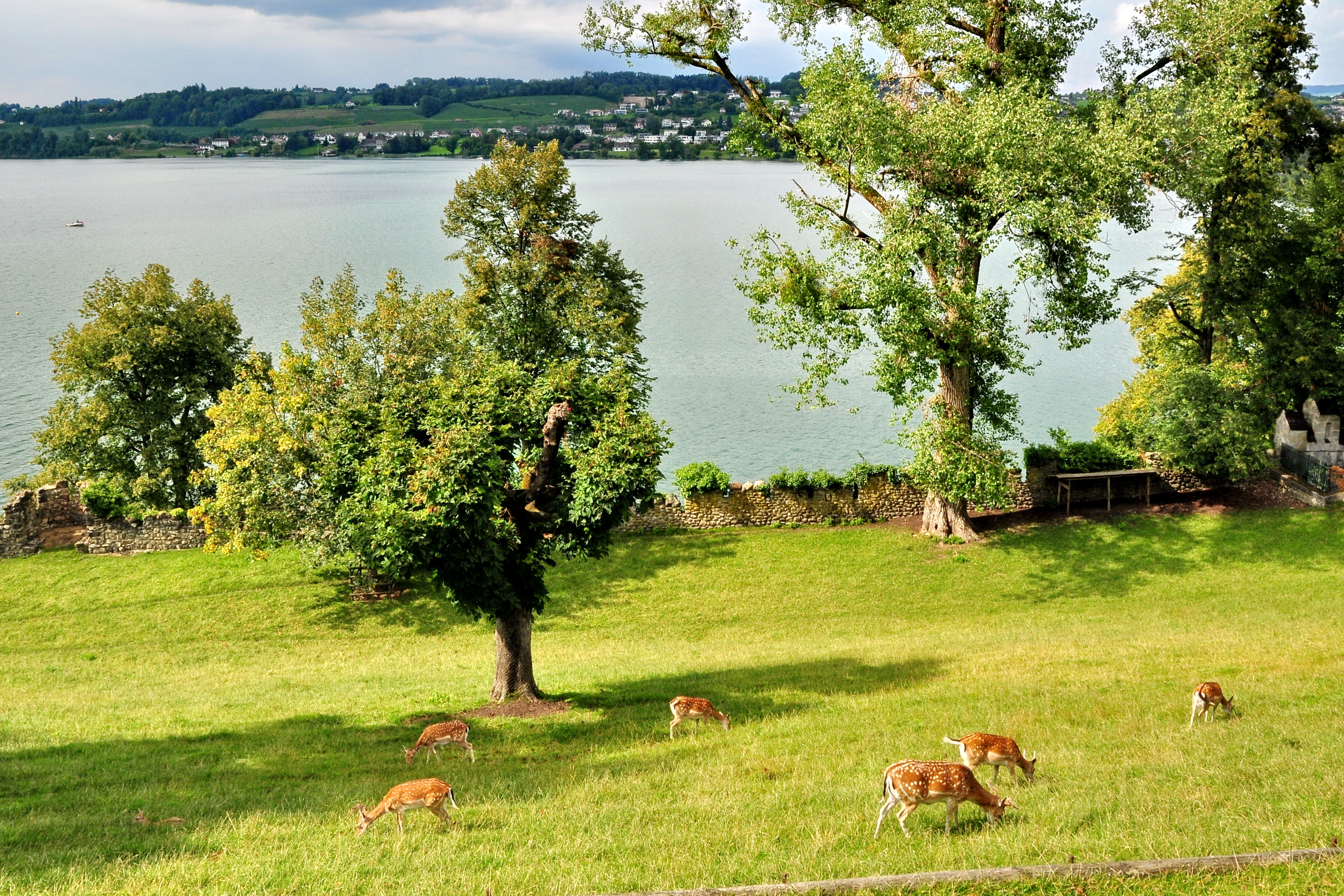
Deer Park on Lindenhof, Lake Zurich and Kempraten in the background

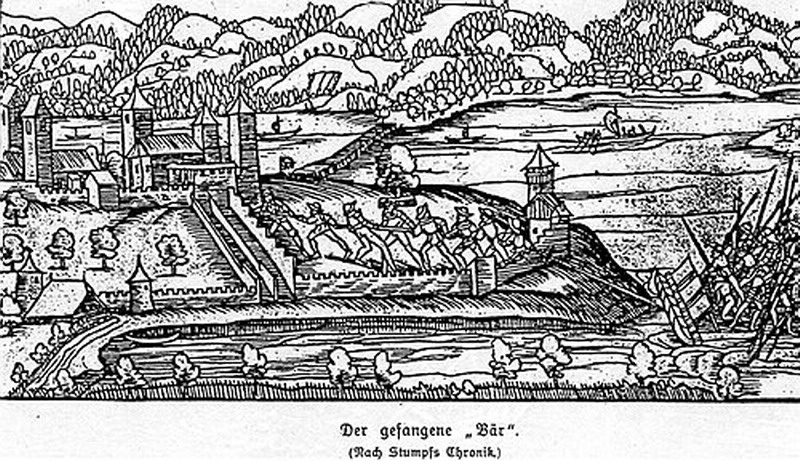
Rapperswil/Habsburg soldiers marquing a battle barque manned by Old Swiss Conferdation soldiers at Endigerhorn in Rapperswil, Rapperswil Castle atop the Lindenhof hill to the left, Old Zurich War around 1445)

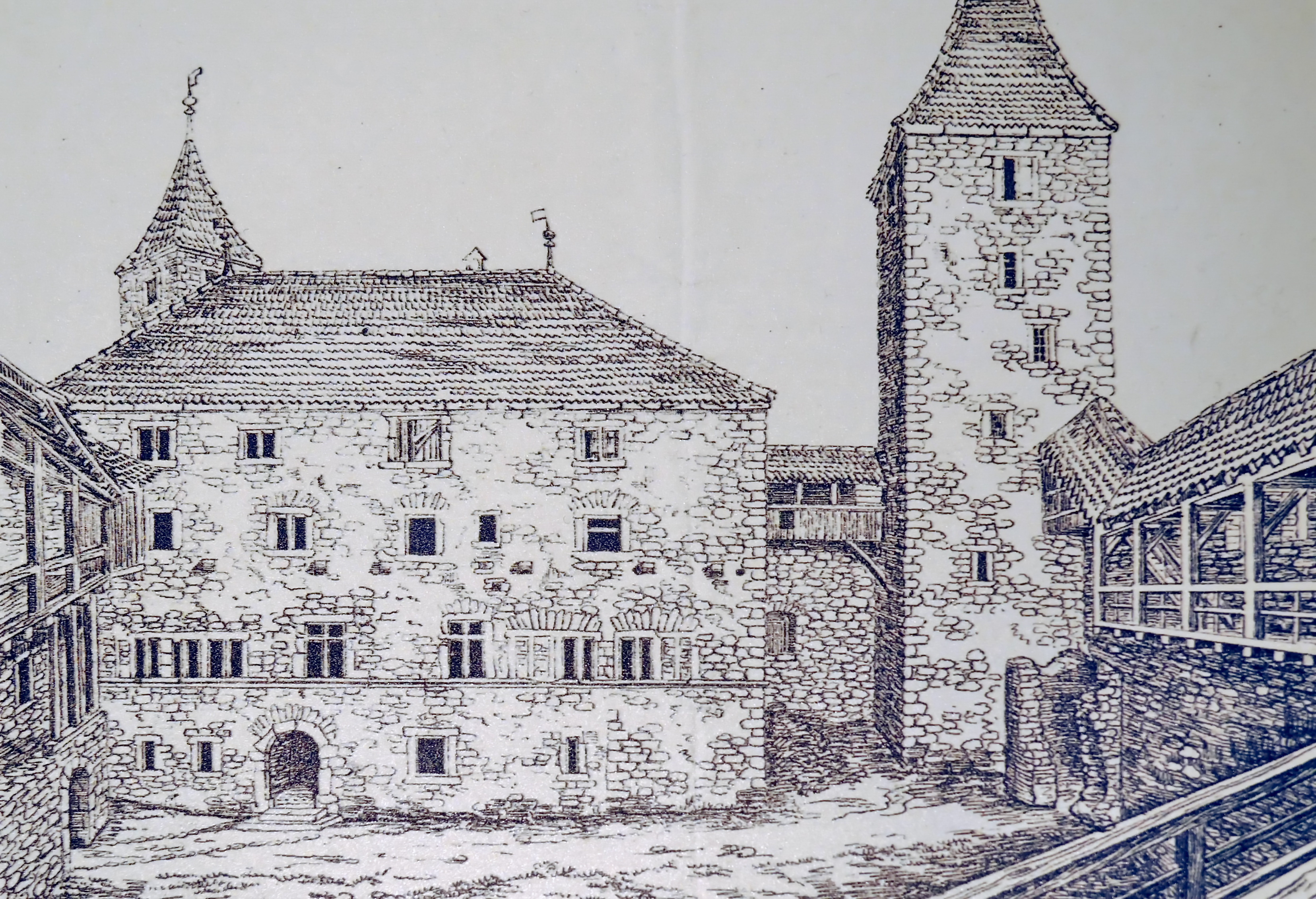
The ruined Rapperswil castle, view of the palas and so-called Gügegliturm tower from the courtyard, drawing by Heinrich Keller around 1848

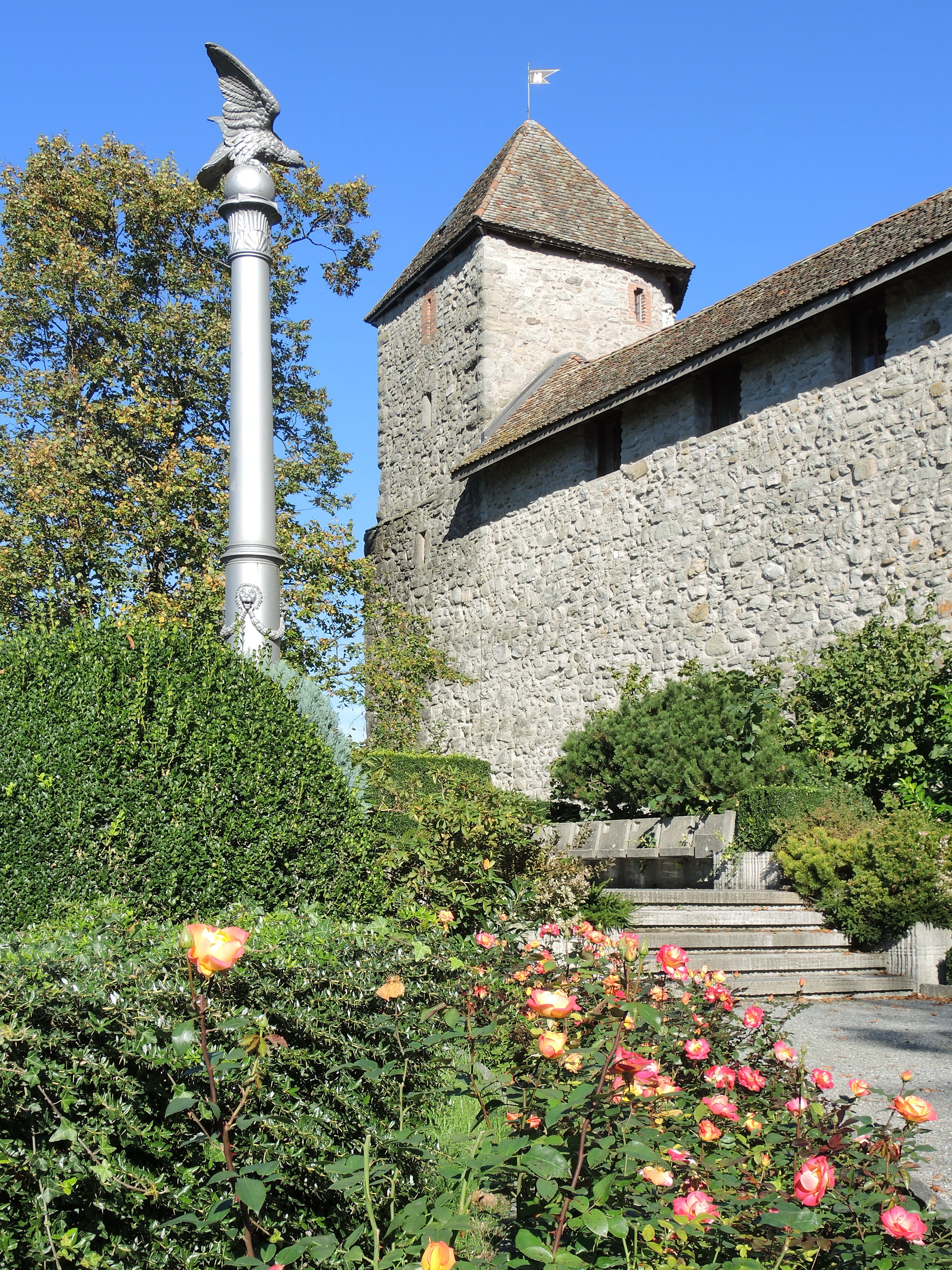
Polish freedom pillar (Freiheitssäule) and the so-called Pulverturm

== Geography ==
The medieval Old city of Rapperswil is dominated by the castle perched atop a longish rocky hill on the peninsula called Lindenhof hill on its western side respectively Herrenberg on its eastern side where the castle was built. It is surrounded on three sides by Lake Zurich and by those upper section on the northwestern Seedamm area. Thus, the castle was well protected, dominating the old town of Rapperswil, and controlling the water way between Walensee and Lake Zurich on its most narrow part, as well as the medieval Gotthard Pass route between Lombardy and Zurich, and the Jakobsweg (Way of St. James) to the Einsiedeln Abbey.

The castle is situated next to Stadtpfarrkirche Rapperswil and the present cemetery chapel, and (to the east) neighboured by former small castle, as of today the Stadtmuseum Rapperswil.

== History ==
Rapperswil Castle dates back around 1200 to 1220 AD, and it was first mentioned in 1229 on occasion of the foundation of the Rüti Abbey. The castle and the fortifications of the former locus Endingen (given by the Einsiedeln Abbey) were built by Count Rudolf II and his son Rudolf III von Rapperswil, when the nobility of Rapperswil moved from Altendorf (Alt-Rapperswil) across the lake to the other side of the so-called Seedamm, maybe to establish their own parish church and to avoid to go the mess, by crossing the lake, in St. Martin Busskirch. As before in the 11th and 12th century AD, the family acted as Vogt of the Einsiedeln Abbey. Sandstone from the Lützelau island was used to build the castle, the town walls and the city.

The chapel adjoining the ossuary dates back to the time when the parish passed from the Busskirch church to the Rapperswil church and accordingly an inner city cemetery was established. The first chapel was associated to the castle, but the chapel was located outside of its walls and separated by a trench. The preceding building of the Liebfrauenkapelle was built as an ossuary around 1220 to 1253. The charnel house was first mentioned as intra cymeterium ecclesia, meaning church in the cemetery.

The Counts of Rapperswil became extinct in 1283 with the death of the 18-year-old Count Rudolf V, after which emperor Rudolf I acquired their fiefs. The Herrschaft Rapperswil proper passed to the house of Homberg represented by Count Ludwig († April, 27 1289) by first marriage of Countess Elisabeth von Rapperswil. Around 1309 the bailiwick passed to Count Rudolf von Habsburg-Laufenburg († 1315) by second marriage of Countess Elisabeth, the sister of Rudolf V, followed by her son, Count Johann I († 1337 in Grynau) and his son, Johann II († 1380).

In 1350 an attempted coup by the aristocratic opposition (a central person was Count Johann II) in the city of Zurich was forcefully put down, and the town walls of Rapperswil and the castle were destroyed by Rudolf Brun. Eis-zwei-Geissebei, a Carnival festival hold in Rapperswil on Shrove Tuesday, may go back to the siege and destruction of the city of Rapperswil. The battlements and the castle were rebuilt by Albrecht II, Duke of Austria in 1352/54.

After the extinction of the line of Habsburg-Laufenburg in 1442, the castle was given to the citizens of Rapperswil. Ending Old Zurich War, Rapperswil was controlled by the Swiss Confederation from 1458 to 1798 as a so-called Gemeine Herrschaft, i.e. under control of two cantons of the Old Swiss Conferation and their representative, a Vogt, and Rapperswil castle became an administration site respectively military base and prison.

Over the course of time, the castle fell into disrepair. In 1870 the castle was leased for 99 years from the local authorities by a post-November 1830 Uprising Polish émigré, Count Wladyslaw Broel-Plater (a relative of Emilia Plater, a heroine of the same 1830 Uprising), who had been in Switzerland since 1844. At his own expense he restored the castle, and on 23 October 1870 the Polish National Museum was established. Except for two hiatuses (1927 to 1936 and 1952 to 1975), the museum has existed to the present day — an outpost of Polish culture in Switzerland.

In 2008 some Rapperswil residents petitioned local authorities to evict the Polish Museum from its home in the castle, as two historical museum locations (Stadtmuseum and Polish Museum) estimated to be too expensive. The museum was conducting a petition campaign to retain the Museum in the castle, but although the Stadtmuseum (museum of local history was kept respectively renewed at its location at the nearby Breny house at Herrenberg in 2012/13, indeed, the future of the Polish Museum remains unsure.

== Architecture and points of interest ==
=== Building ===
Rebuilt by Duke Albert II, since 1354 the castle forms an almost equilateral triangle, and each corner of the castle is reinforced with a tower. The highest tower in the southwest is the donjon, commonly called Gügeliturm in Swiss-German language, where the so-called Hochwächter warned the residents against approaching danger or fire. The five-sided Zeitturm, a clock tower in the east, houses three bells and beside a sundial and two large clocks. Between these two towers the castle's six-storey palais is situated. In addition, ramparts respectively battlements are leading to the third tower in the northwest, the so-called Pulverturm (powder tower). From 1698 to 1837 there was a drawbridge, at the present lower gate towards the former castle chapel. The French revolutionary troops plundered the castle's interior in 1798.

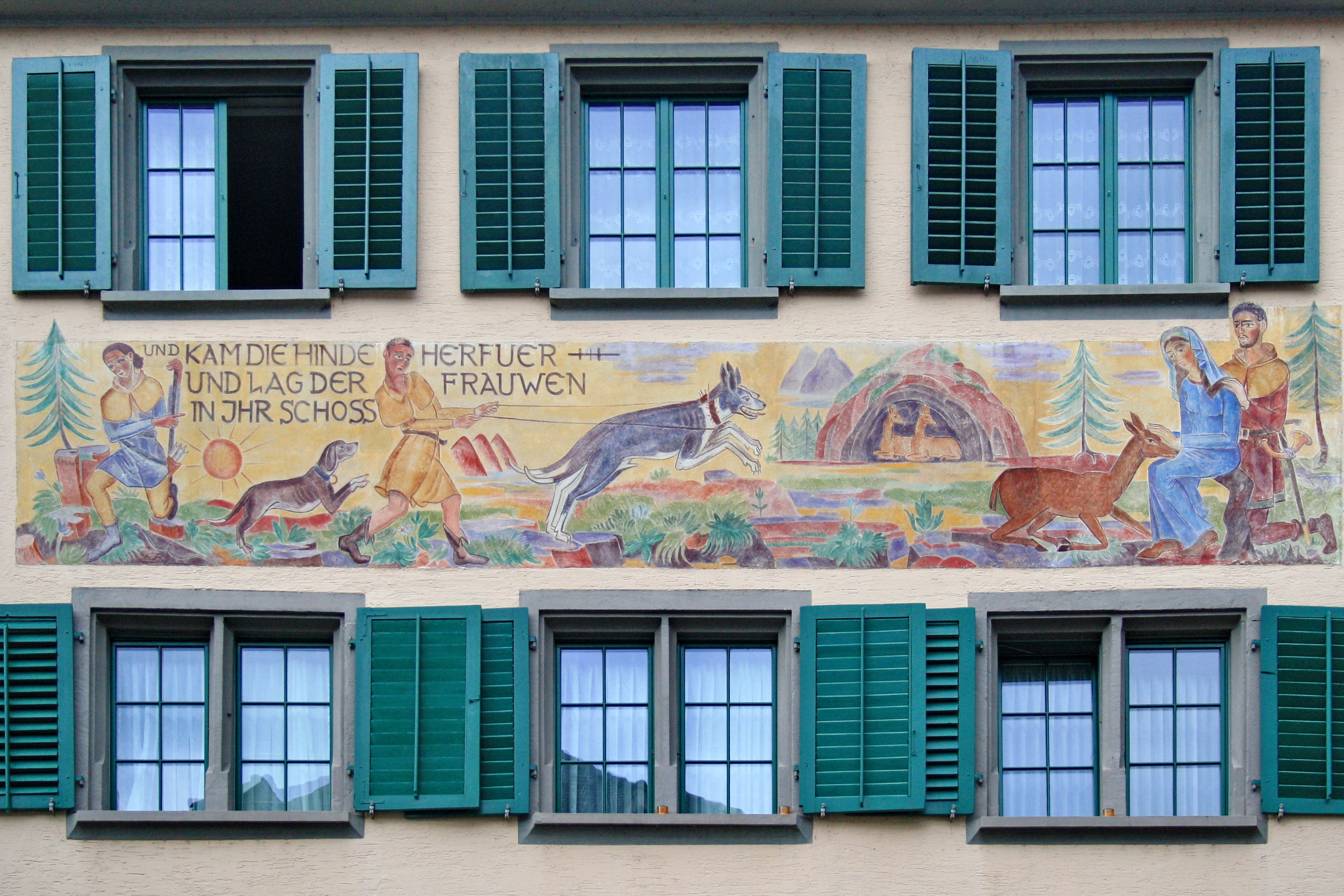
Legend of founding on a house at Hauptplatz

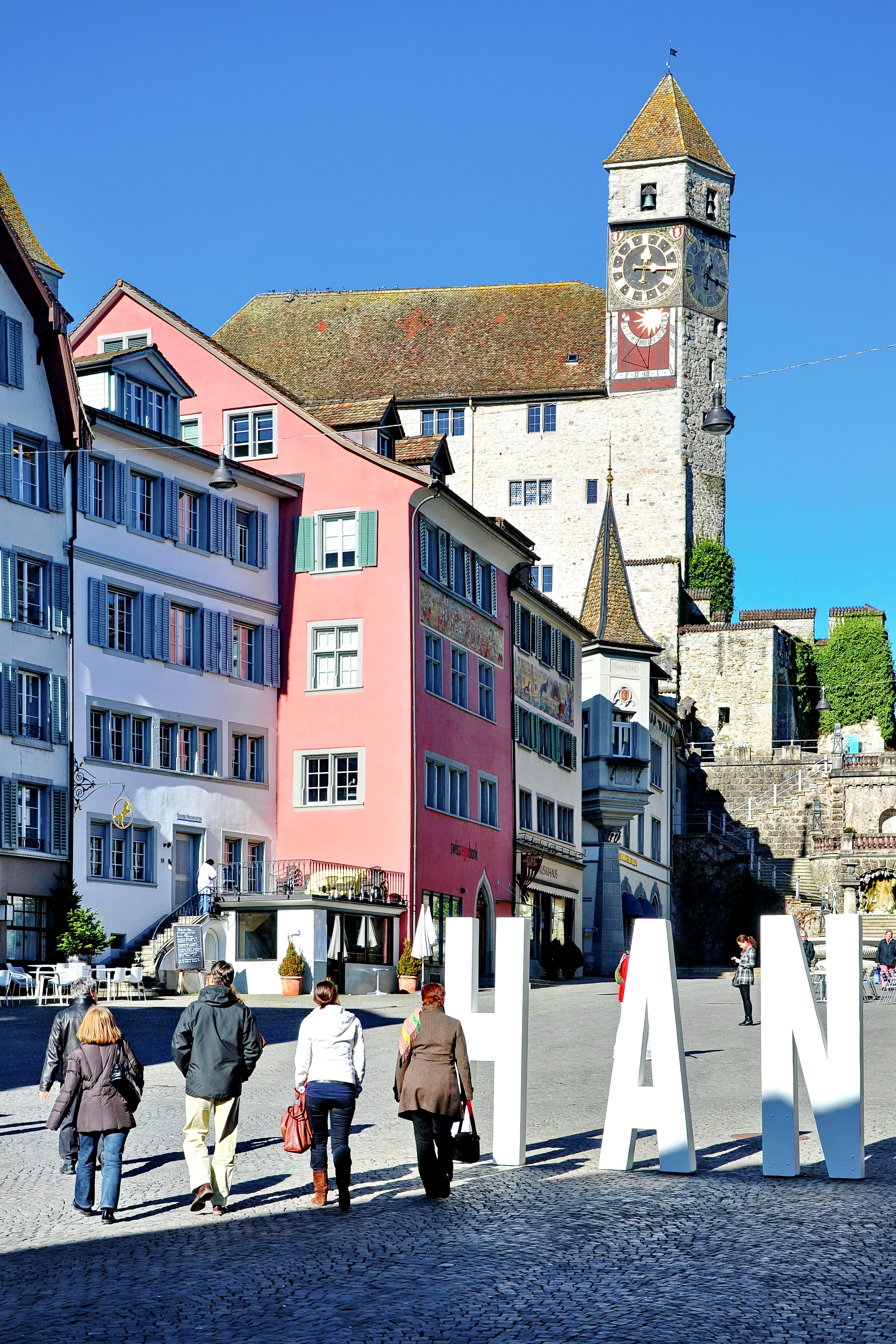
Zeitturm as seen from the south (Hauptplatz)

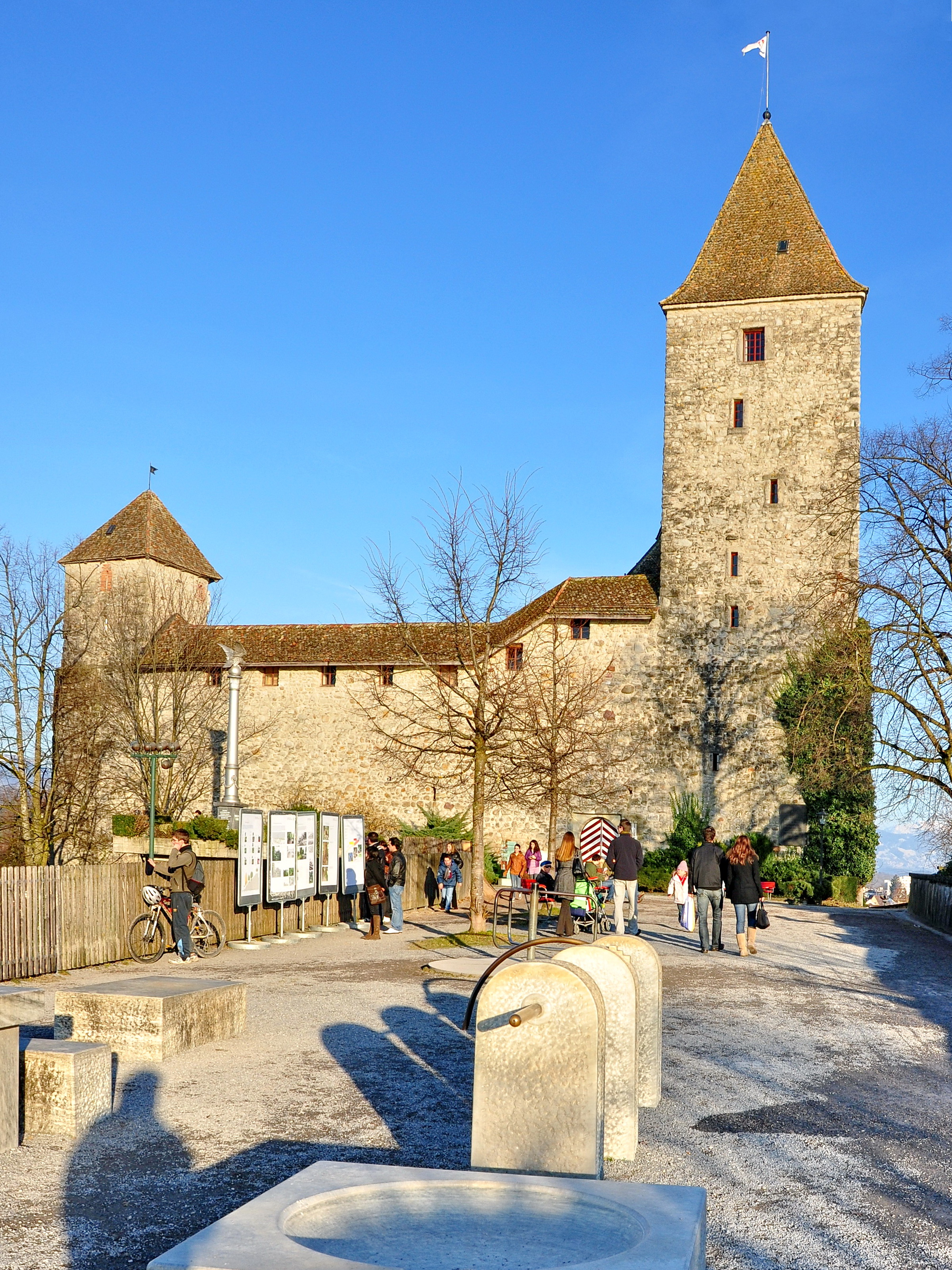
Gügeliturm and Lindenhof as seen from the west

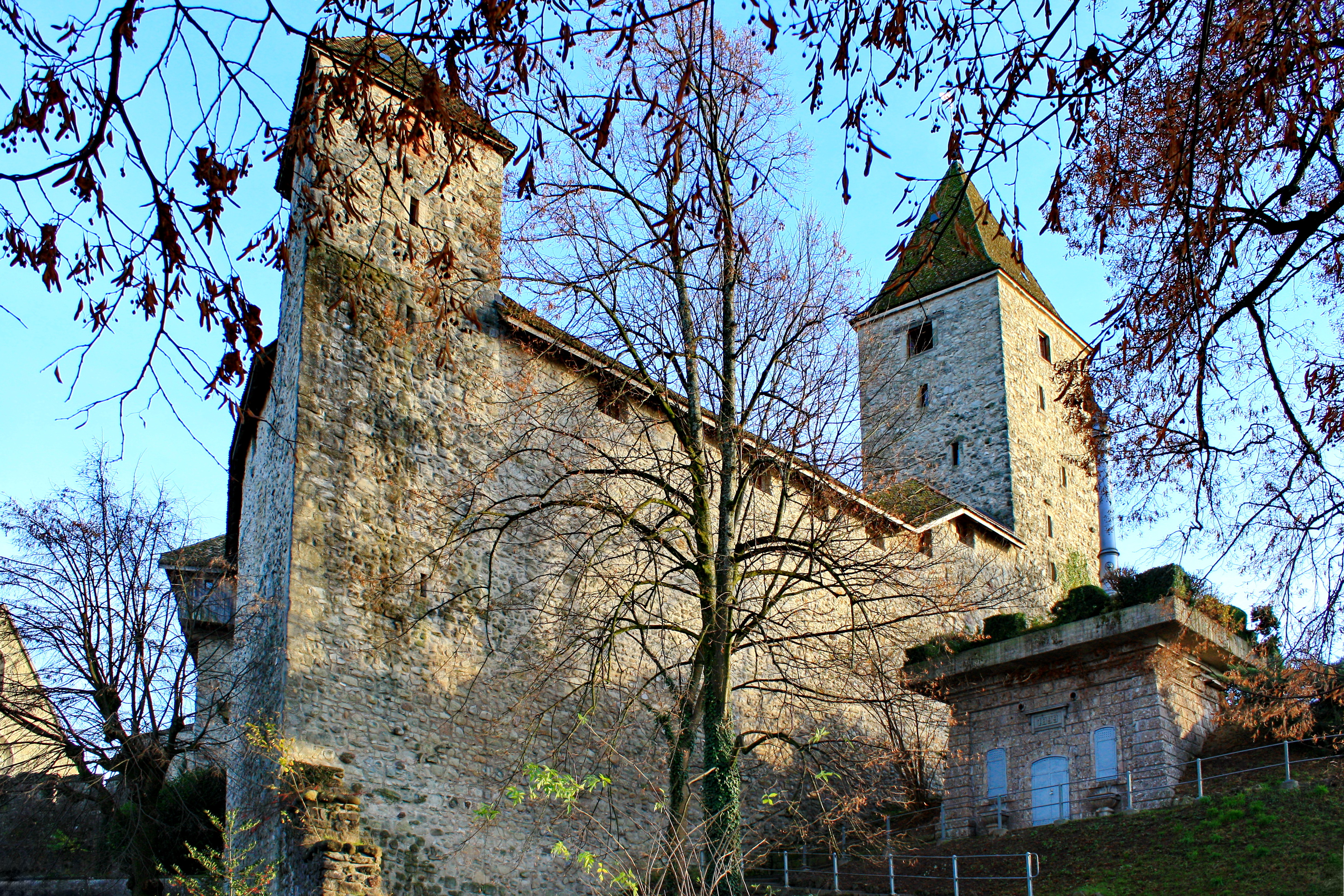
Pulverturm and Polish freedom pillar as seen from the north

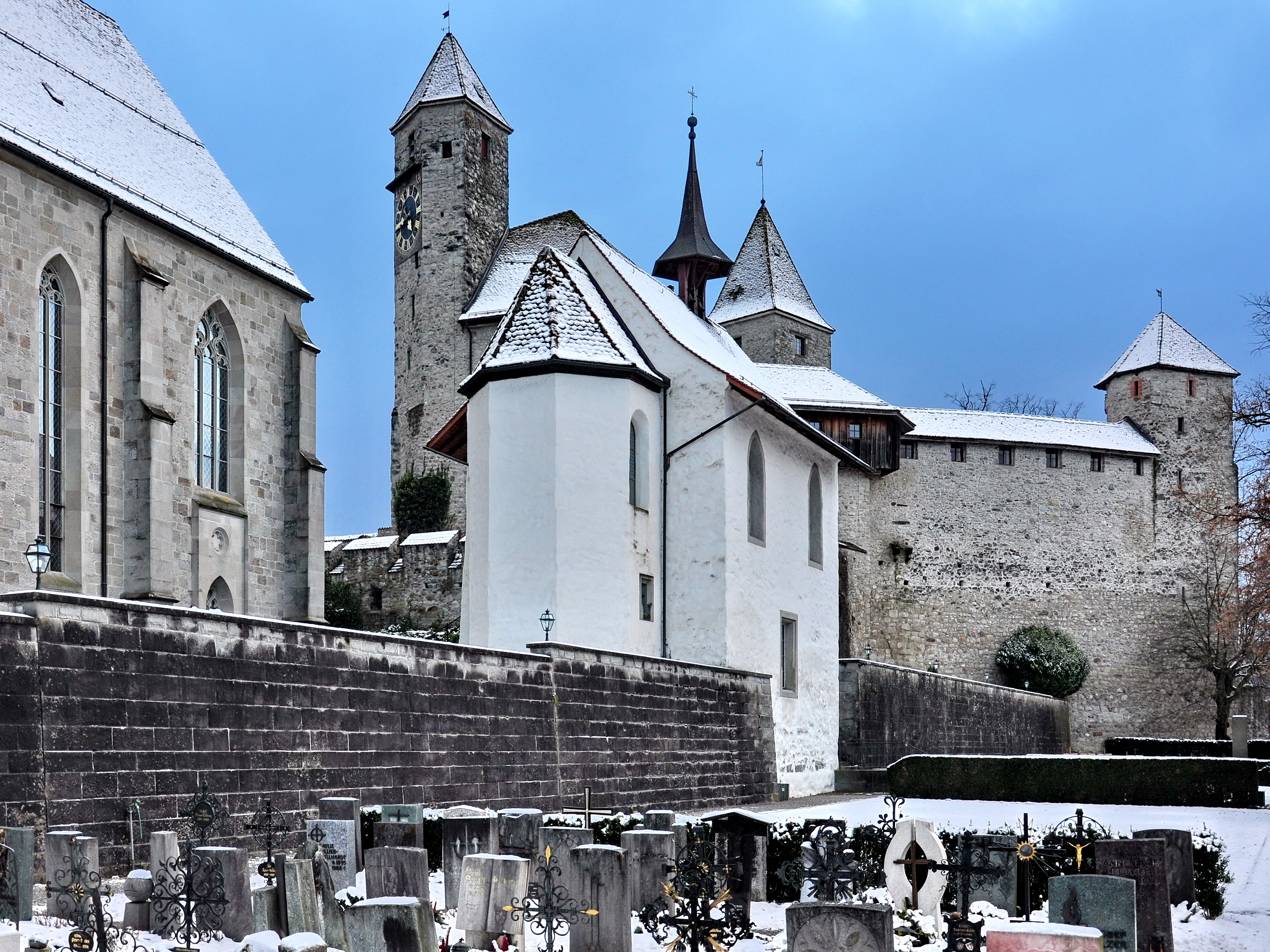
As seen from the cemetery in the east, Liebfrauenkapelle and St. John's Church to the left

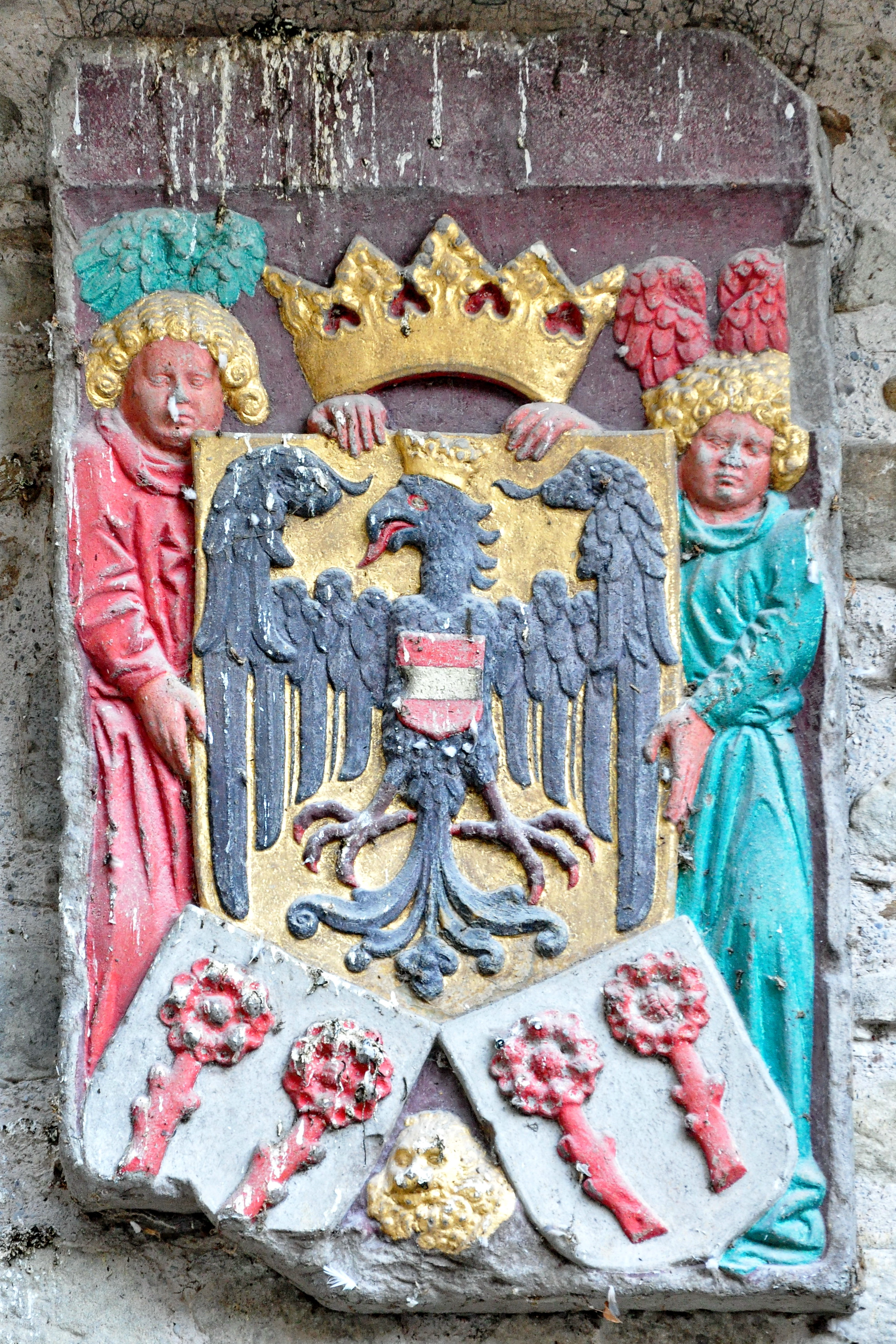
Relief of the Rapperswil coats of arms over the main portal

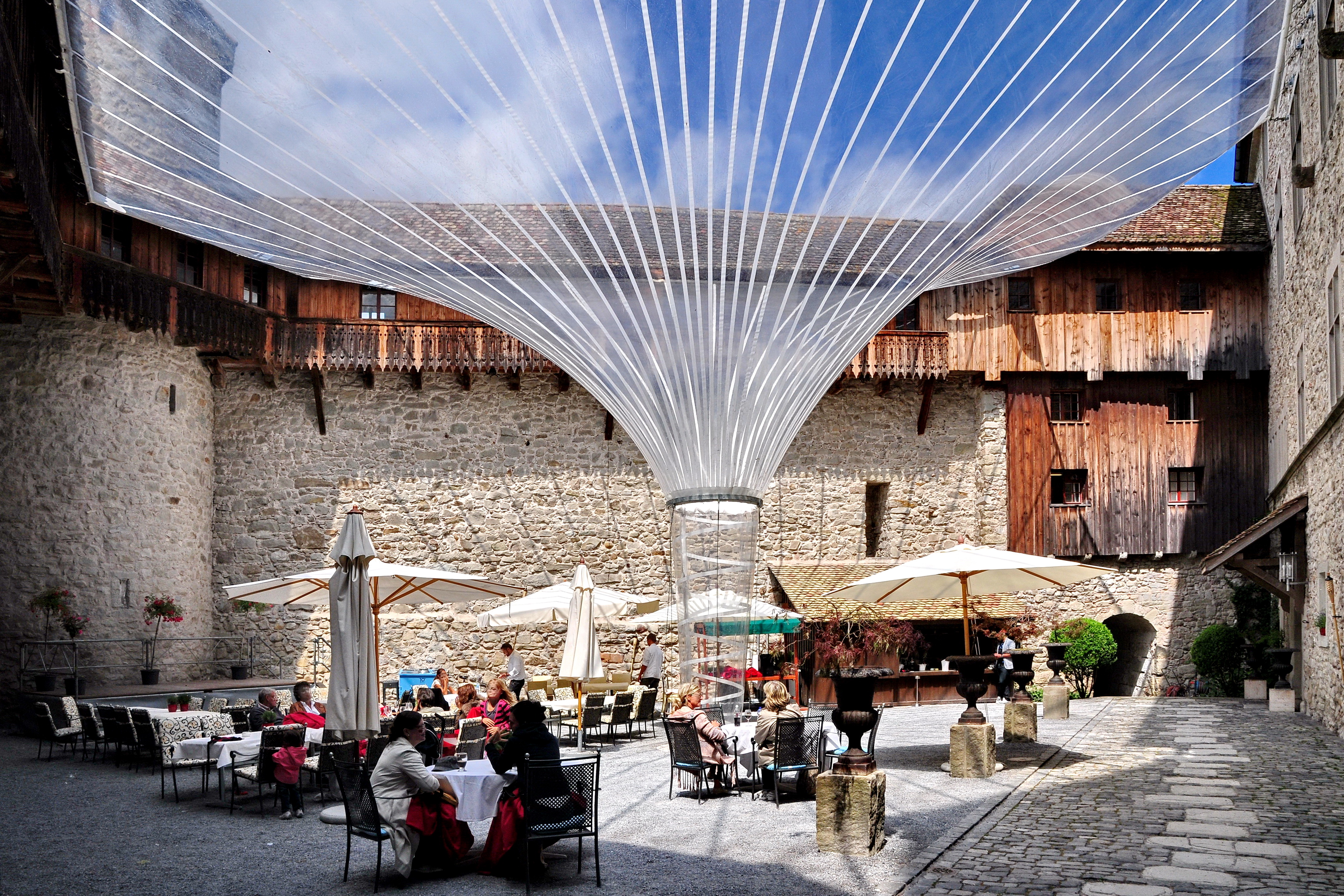
The castle's main portal and battlements

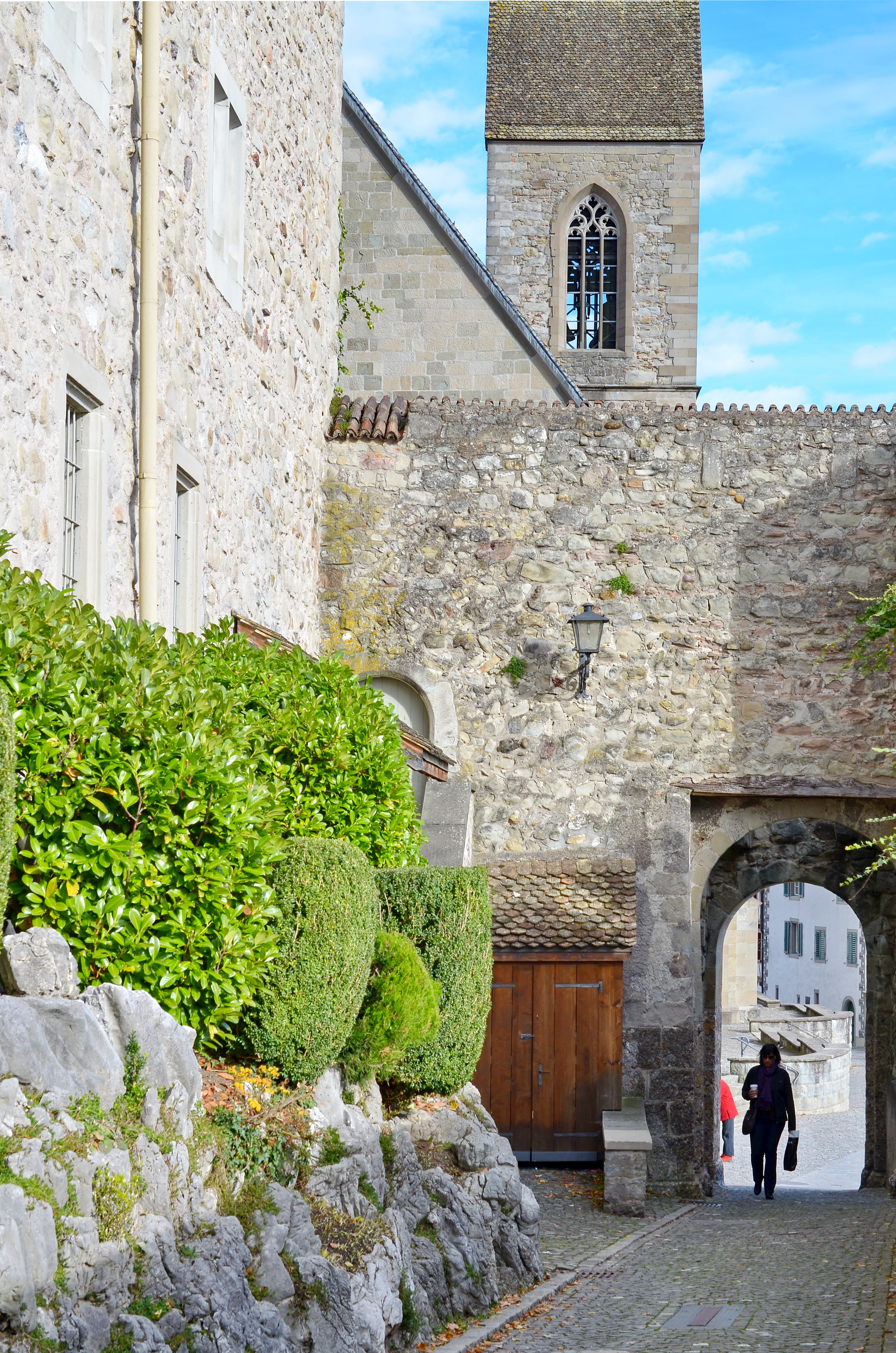
Lower portal, St John's Church (to the left) and Herrenberg in the background

=== Interior ===
Inside the castle's palais, there is located next to the Polish Museum the Schloss Restaurant. After-hours visits are available by appointment, as well as guided tours for groups, though the castle is only partly accessible for the public. The impressive Rittersaal (knights' hall) and the historical wooden architecture, as well as some pictures and tapestries, include further points of interest.

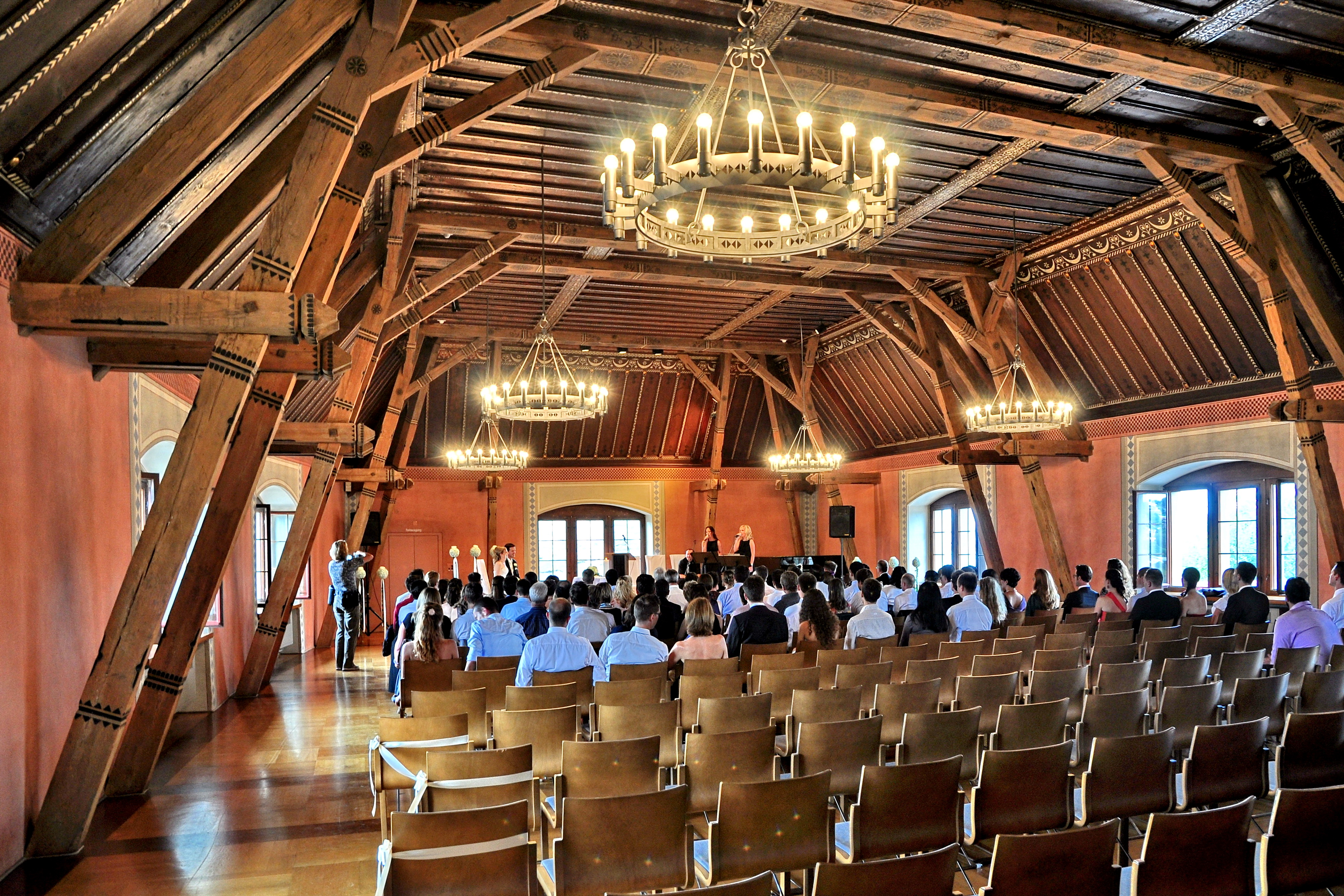
Rittersaal in the palas

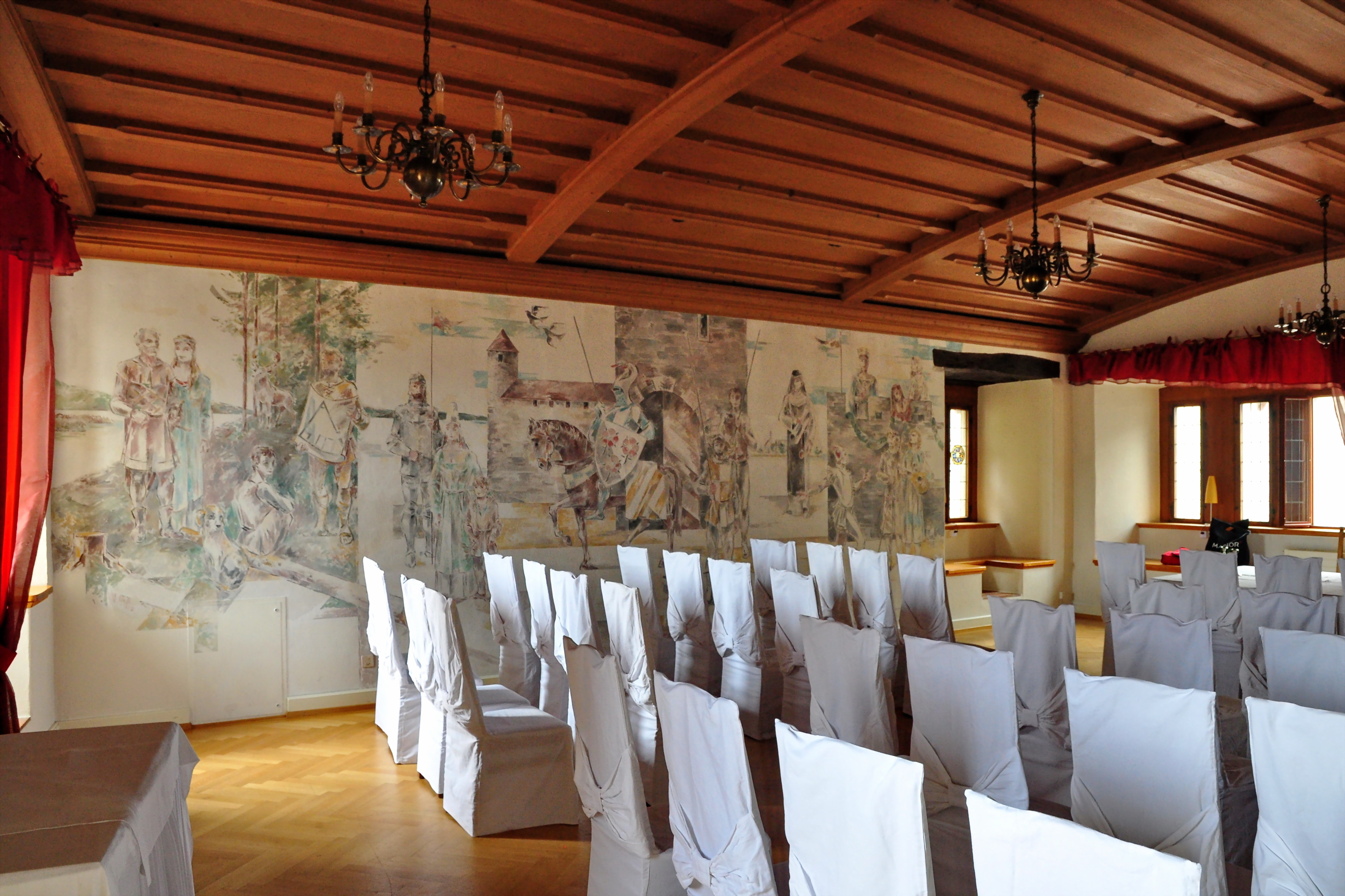

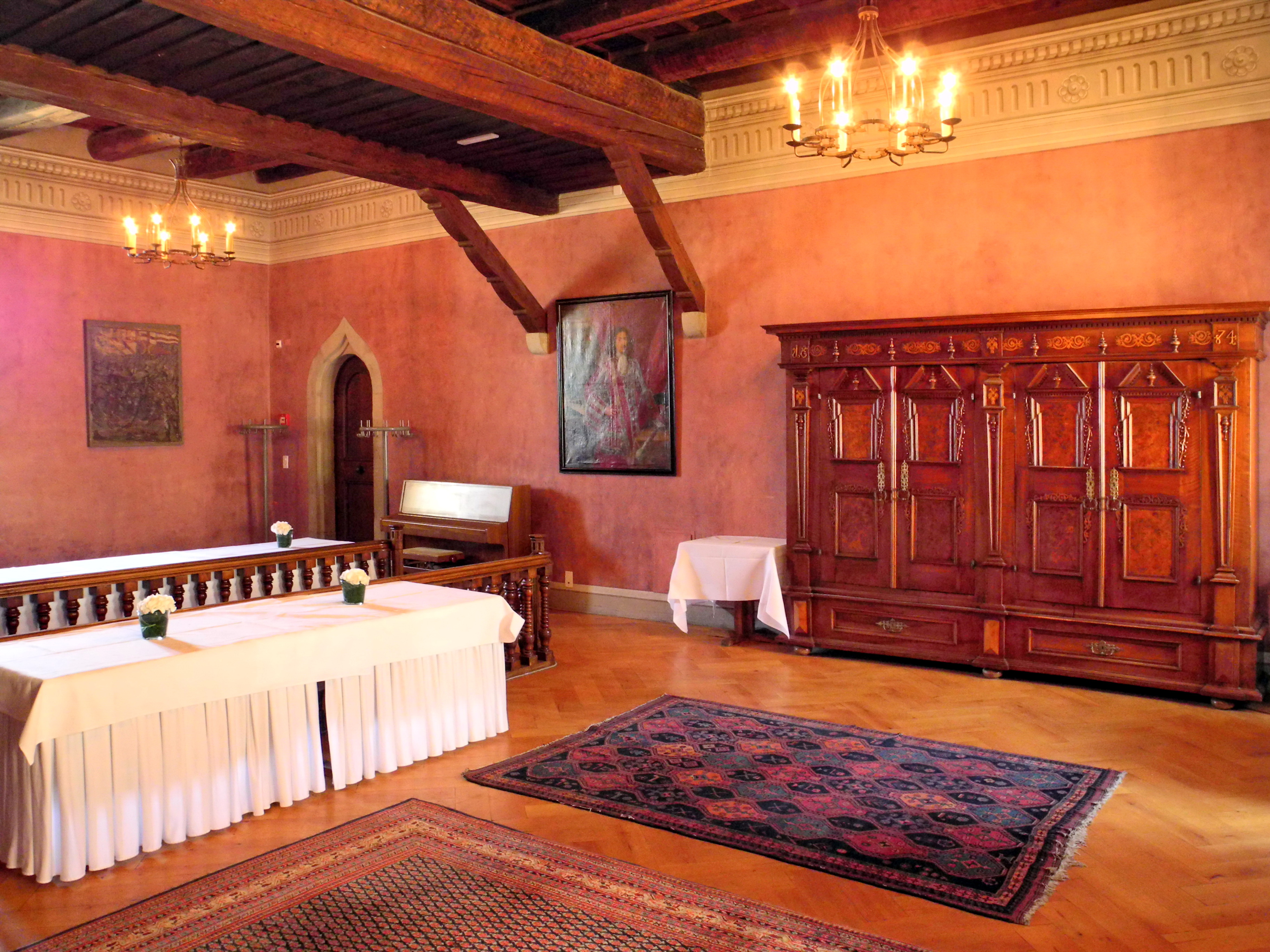
interior view

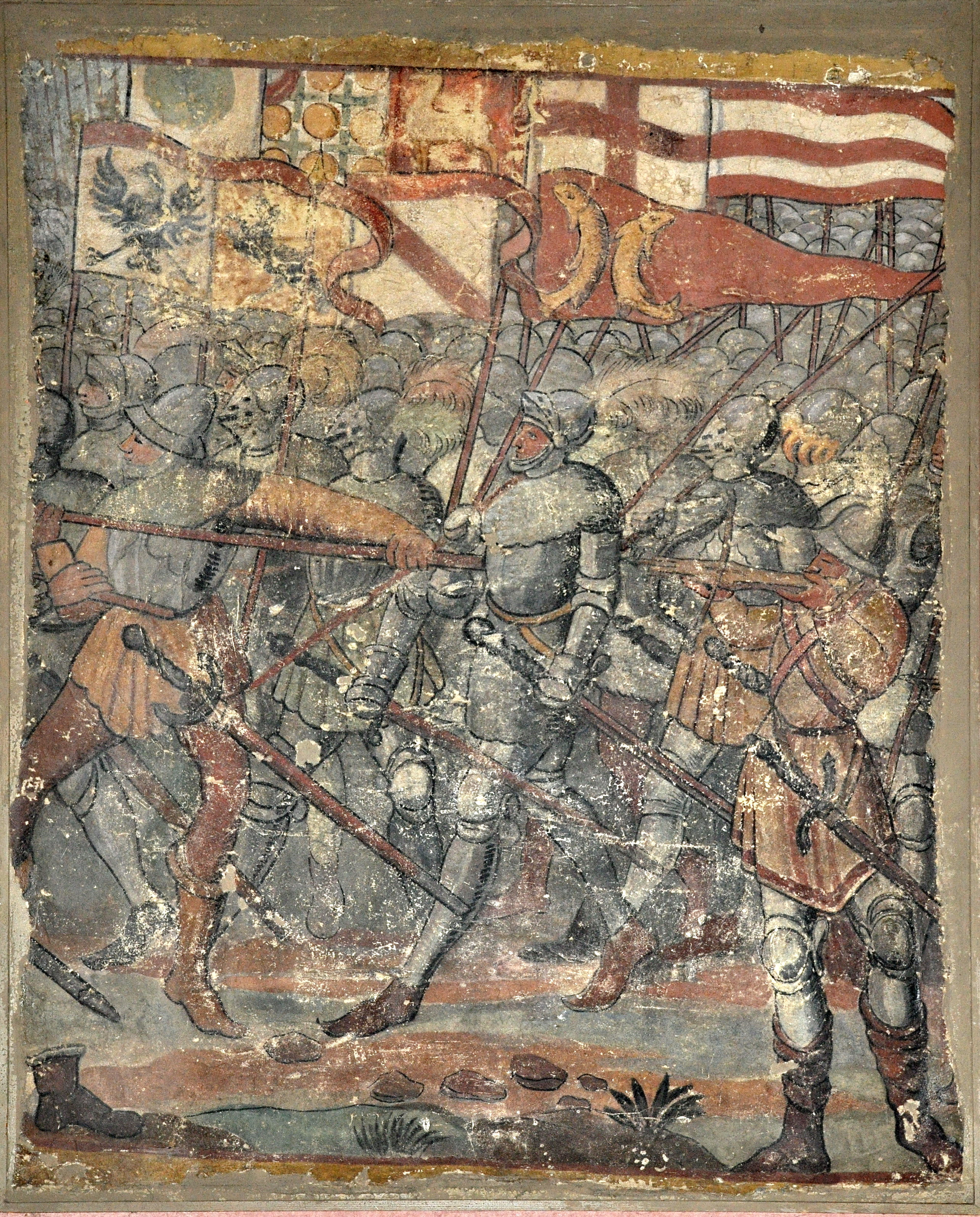
frescos in the donjon

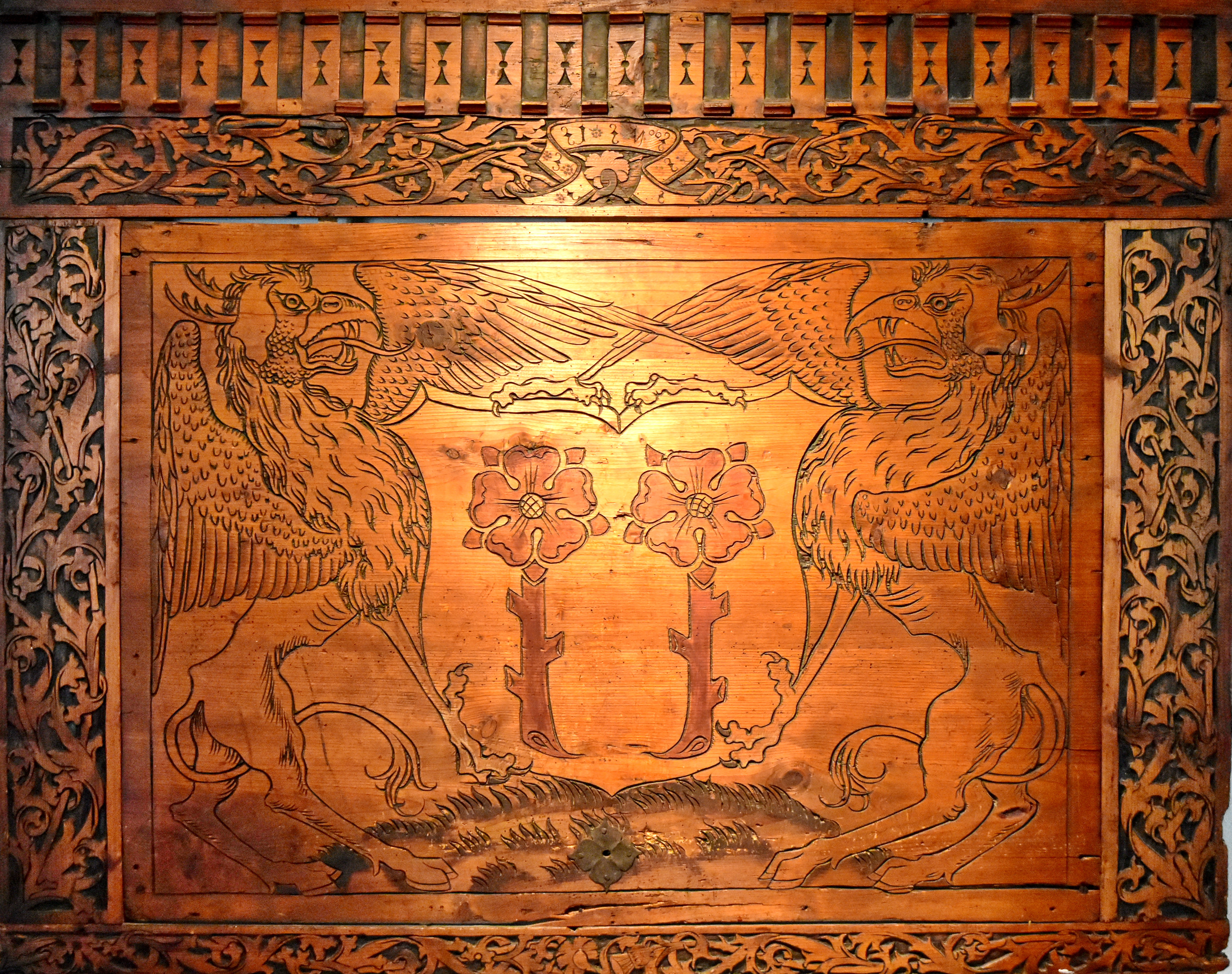
Gothic wooden supraporta, now in the Rathaus Rapperswil

=== Herbal garden ===
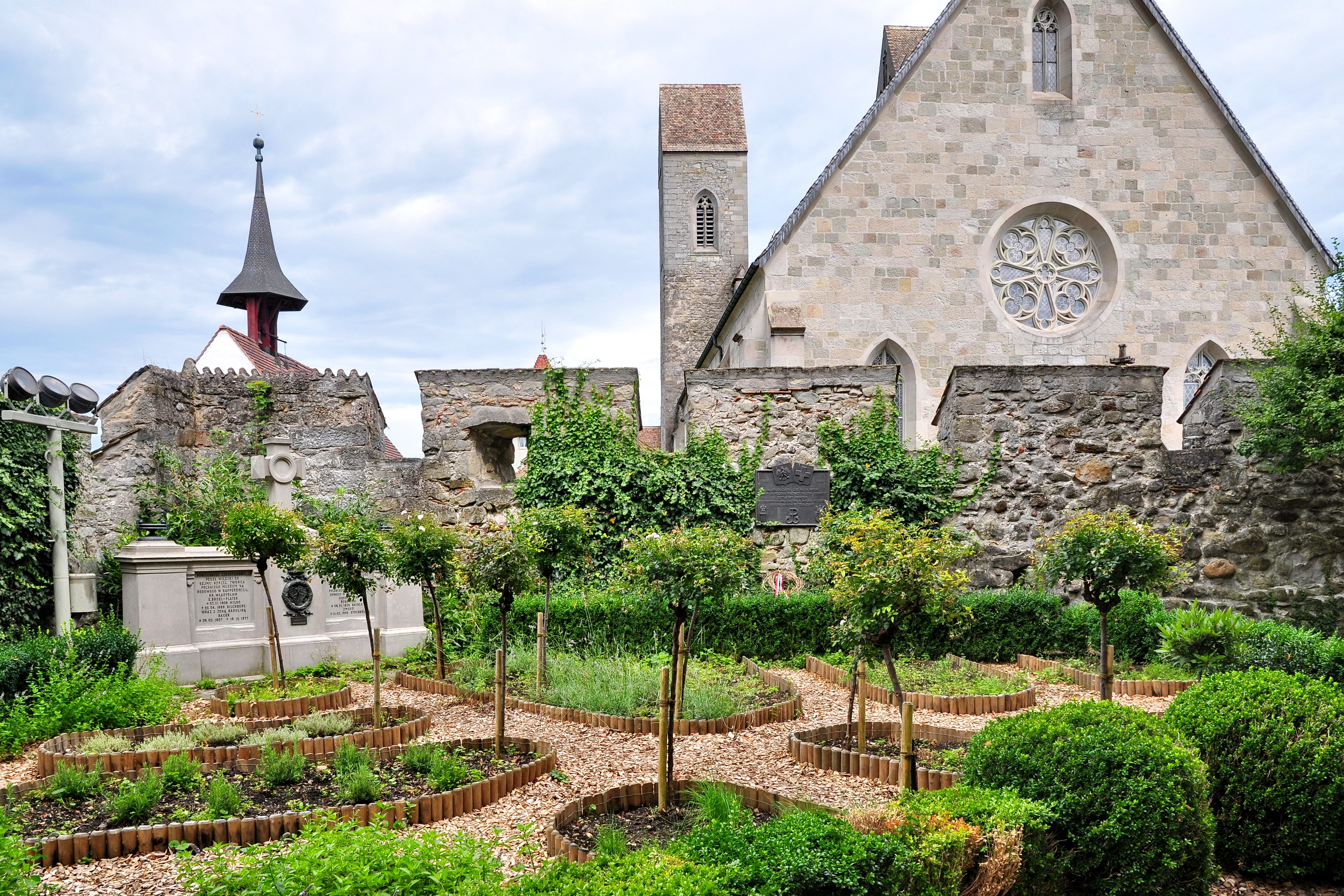
Herbal garden on a small plateau within the castle's fortifications, Liebfrauenkapelle's clock tower and the main facade of the St. John's church in the background

The city and local board of Rapperswil-Jona initiated in 2011 a new service and operating concept for the Rapperswil castle to provide the site as a touristic attraction and meeting place, and thus recognizable as a brand. For this purpose, the tower, the battlements and the herb garden were opened to the public.

=== Lindenhof hill ===
In 981 AD the assumably oldest vineyard on Lake Zurich lake shore, situated on the southern slope of the Lindenhof hill which is named Schlossberg was mentioned for the first time. On the castle's terrace, the eastern part of the so-called Lindenhof hill-square, the Polish freedom pillar is situated, as a sign of Switzerland's solidarity with people who struggle for their freedom, as well a tiny rose garden. From there is also an impressing view over the medieval town of Rapperswil, upper and lower Lake Zurich, on the Seedamm and the wooden bridge from Rapperswil to Hurden and the Frauenwinkel protected area, and towards the Glarus Alps, as well as to the Bachtel mountain. Among other traditions, Eis-zwei-Geissebei is celebrated on Lindenhof, at the Rathaus and Castle when in the evening all regional Guggenmusik (carnival marching bands) gather to celebrate a roaring concert. On the northern side of the Lindenhof plateau stretches a supervised Deer park with 10 to 15 Dama dama down towards the Kempratnerbucht which is a reminder of the legend of the castle's founding.

== State of research ==
It is also assumed a predecessor building, a Roman era watchtower in conjunction with the Vicus Centum Prata, but for the present there are no archaeological findings. Due to the structural conditions, there never significant archaeological excavations were carried out, incidentally at the entire area of the Lindenhof and Herrenberg area. Likewise, there are few reliable data for the construction, only the renovations and the function of the castle are therefore secured by historical sources.

== Heritage sites of national significance ==
Rapperswil Castle and the Polish Museum are listed in the Swiss inventory of cultural property of national and regional significance, as well as the historical lake crossings and settlements, as Class A objects of national importance.

== See also ==
- Lindenhof (Rapperswil)
- Stadtmuseum Rapperswil
- Einsiedlerhaus
