= Johann II (Habsburg-Laufenburg) =

Johann II von Habsburg-Laufenburg
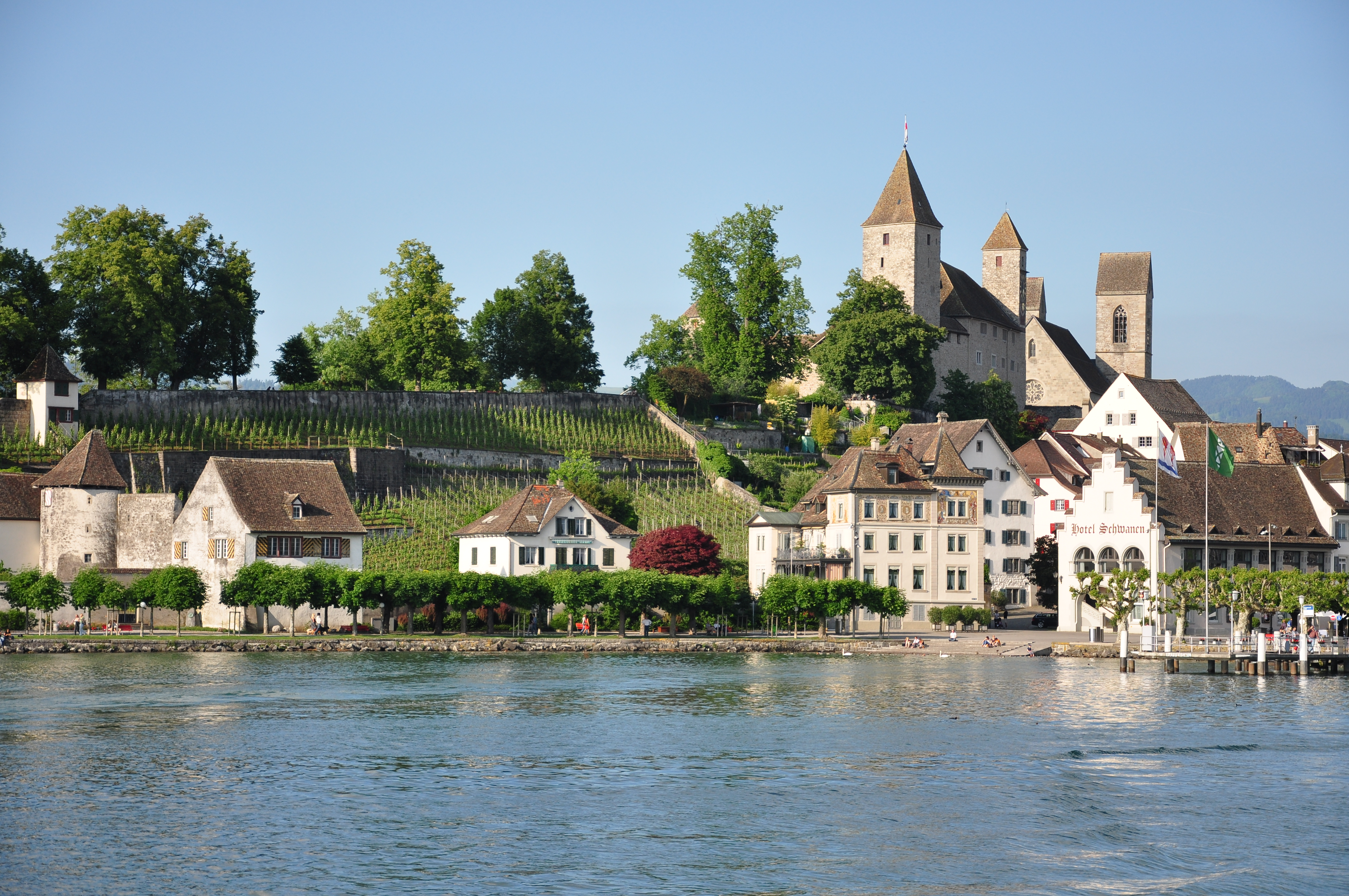
- Rapperswil and its Schloss on the Lindenhof hill, Einsiedlerhaus and Endingerturm to the left.
- Born: c. 1330 probably Rapperswil
- Died: 17 December 1380 (aged 49–50); Rapperswil
- Other names: Rapperswil-Laufenburg; Laufenburg-Rapperswil; Rapperswil-Habsburg
- Occupation: Count of Grafschaft Rapperswil
- Years active: 1337–1380
- Known for: Son of Countess Agnes von Werd and Count Johann(es) von Habsburg-Laufenburg respectively Count of Rapperswil
- Spouse: Varenne de Neufchâtel-Blamont
- Children: Verena and Johann (Jean) III

Johann II von Habsburg-Laufenburg (also Johannes von Rapperswil-Laufenburg-Habsburg, von Laufenburg-Rapperswil; born around 1330; died 17 December 1380) was the Count of the House of Habsburg-Laufenburg and later Count of the House of Rapperswil.

== Early life ==
Johann was born around 1330, probably in the Rapperswil Castle in the Swiss medieval city of Rapperswil, as the oldest son of Agnes von Werd († 1352) and Johann († 1337), Countess Elisabeth von Rapperswil's († 1309) son of second marriage with Count Rudolf von Habsburg-Laufenburg († 1315). He had three younger siblings: Agnes who became a nun, Rudolf (IV) and Gottfried (II). Johann may have been raised in Rapperswil and even educated at the royal Habsburg court after the death of his father on 21 December 1337 on the occasion of a battle against Zürich-Toggenburg invaders at the Grynau Castle. As did his grandmother, Johann II also supported the Rüti Abbey and assigned an estate and all rights in the name of his younger siblings on 17 June 1340.

== Count of Habsburg-Rapperswil ==
=== Feud between äusseres Zürich and Brun's regime ===
On 18 July 1336, Rudolf Brun, mayor of the city of Zürich, defeated his political opponents, and probably the majority of the former members of the Rat (council) of Zürich found refuge by count Johann I in Rapperswil. In feud (German: Fehde), an approved tradition in medieval law, the so-called Äusseres Zürich, meaning the banned councillors, formed a coalition that was supported by Johann I, some knights and noble families of the Grafschaft Rapperswil, and Count Johann I became the leader of the opposition in the city of Zürich. Brun's regime was supported among others by the House of Toggenburg as its military arm, as well as by the Einsiedeln Abbey. Some, if not most of the refugees, were decades before their exile vassals of the Counts of Rapperswil, including the ancient councillors family Bilgeri those members lost four of their seats in the council of Zürich. The counsellors hoped for support by the House of Rapperswil and offered probably in return the forgiveness of debt of the Herrschaft Rapperswil, as some sources hypothesize. On 21 September 1337 Graf Diethelm von Toggenburg moved from Zürich over the Obersee to the Grynau Castle at the confluence of the Linth river in the former Tuggenersee. Johann's father was killed by the Zürich troops, while his opponent was killed by the count's vassals.

Count Johann I's underaged children – Johann II, Rudolf, Gotfrid and Agnes – were set under the guardianship of Albrecht, Duke of Austria, sealed by a document between the city of Zürich and the German king respectively Duke Albrecht on 21 November 1337. The document included also a peace contract and regulations, but as well as the documents in the following years − between the city of Zürich and Austria – It included among others: Johann's children got the documents related to their rights in Raprechtswile and their possessions in the March (Alt-Rapperswil) area. Furthermore, the document also included the Zürich councils (äussere Bürger) who refuged to Rapperswil and financial compensations by the former councils to Brun's entourage, they remained banned until 1342, and the äussere former councils had to pledge allegiance to the King and to the citizenry of Zürich. In compensation, the goods and lands of the äussere former councils had to be refunded by the innere (meaning the Guild councils), as long as their property was not sold (by Brun's entourage). These restrictions also included Johann I's children – the German king had to vouch for Brun's regime, Duke Albrecht for Rapperswil and the underage Rapperswil Counts.

On the basis of these facts, the feud was continued by Johann II in the late 1340s, but there also was a short time alliance with the city of Zürich: On 28 September 1343 Count Johann II and his brothers Rudolf and Gotfried von Habsburg and the citizens of Rapperswil signed a document for an eternal confederacy with the city council and the citizens of Zürich. The archives of the Einsiedeln Abbey, then the most important ally of the city Zürich, mention: Between 31 July 1347 and 26 June 1348, Johannes II von Rapperswil, assisted by the citizens of Rapperswil, raided the fortress Pfäffikon and jailed the abbot of Einsiedeln ... but released him on 26 June 1348, and pledged to act as Vogt of the abbey in return that the abbey resolved the ban.

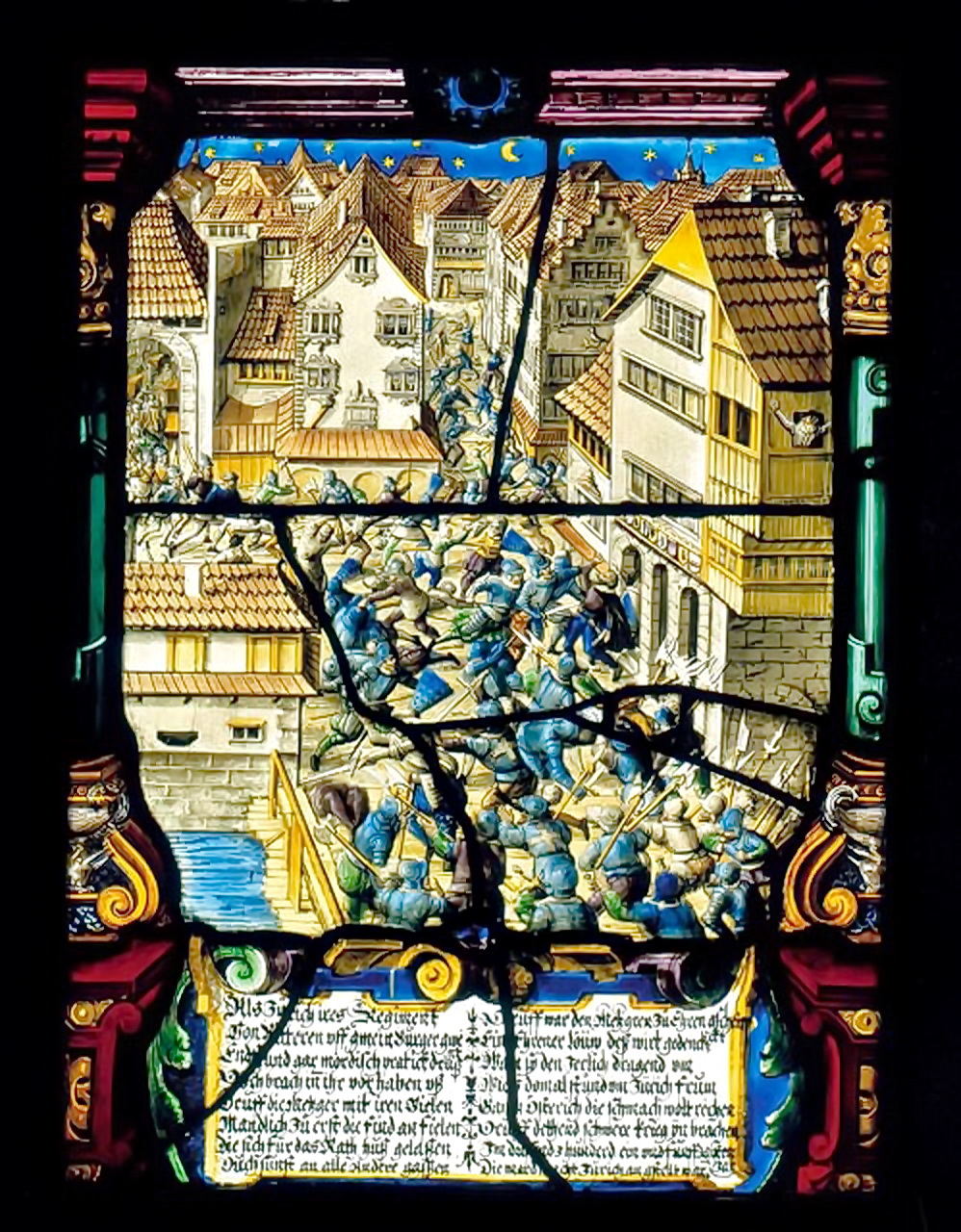
Münsterhof in Zürich showing the so-called "Mordnacht von Zürich" on 23/24 February 1350, 17th-century glass painting

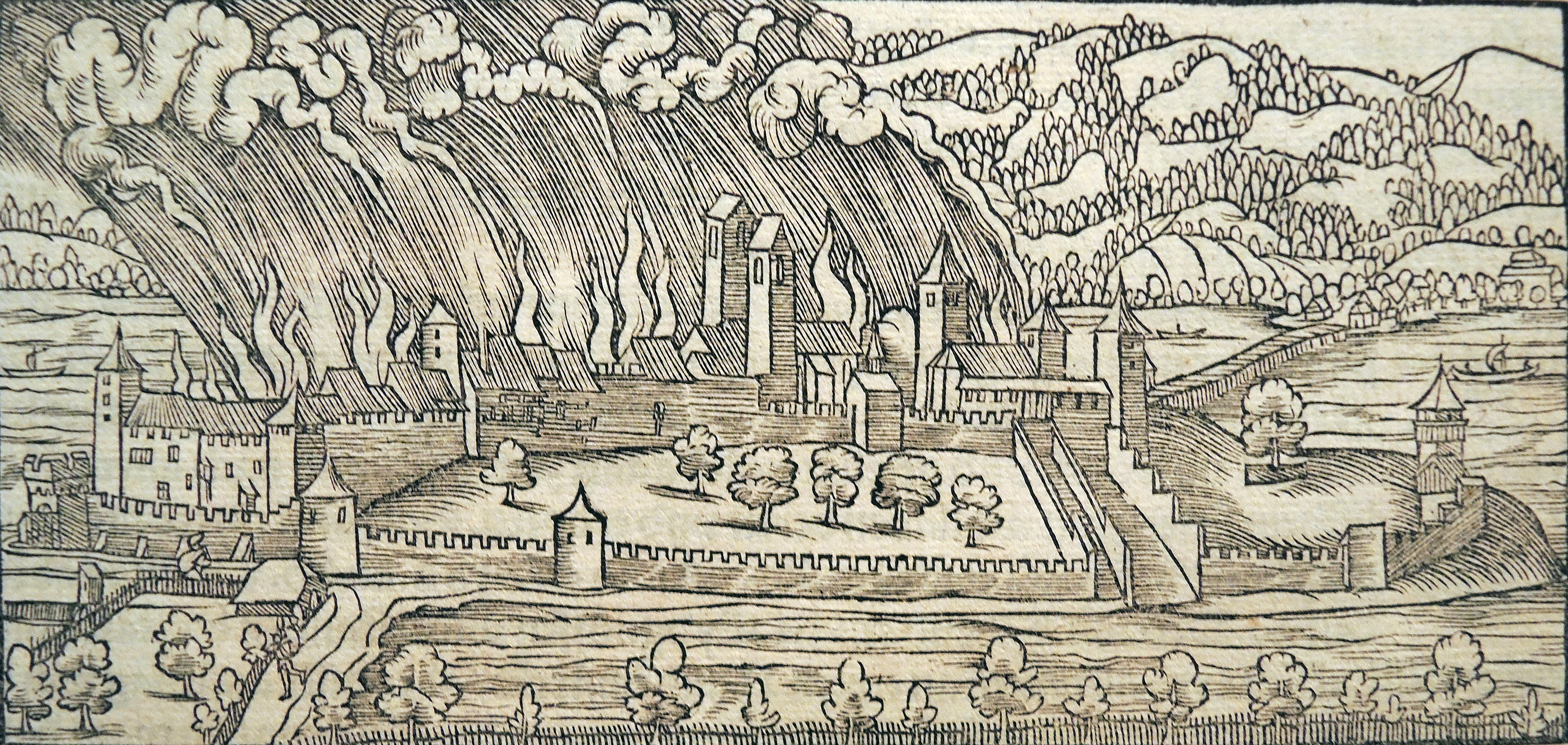
Pillage of Rapperswil by Brun's troops at S. Matthis (probably 24 February 1350) on a woodcut in the chronicle of Johannes Stumpf of 1547/48

An attempted coup by Brun's opposition, known as äusseres Zürich, in the city of Zürich was forcefully put down after intensively forced street fights around the Münsterhof plaza on 23/24 February 1350: Count Johann II, now the opposition's leader, was arrested for two years, and the town walls of Rapperswil, its castle and Altendorf castle were destroyed by Brun. On 1 September 1352, a peace agreement between Count Albrecht von Oesterreich and the city of Zürich was adjusted by two further documents. The first one was the agreement between the Counts Hans (Johann II), Rudolf and Gotfrid, and the city of Zürich was sealed on 19 September 1352, and the brothers had to confirm among others that they would also condone their relatives who supported the city of Zürich. The second document included that Johann's II imprisonment in Zürich shall be forgotten, all prisoners shall be released, and even Count Albrecht would support the city of Zürich against the counts Johans, Rudolf und Gotfrid von Habsburg so needed, sealed by Markgraf Ludwig von Brandenburg on 23 September 1352. Another document was related to the costs of the captivity of Rapperswil citizens in Zürich which was sealed on 20 May 1358 by relatives of the new lord Count Rudolf von Österreich in Rapreswile, namely Ott von Missouw, Fridrich von Waslze, Heinrich der Raspe, Heinrich der Brunner, Wolfgang von Winden, Johanse von Platzhein and Vogt Johans von Langenhart.

=== Division of the estate ===
The division of the estate between the Counts Rudolf, Gotfrid and Johan von Habsburg was regulated in a document on 1 July 1354: Johan received the town of Rapperswil with all accessories and what is on this side of Zürichsee; 110 pound annual interest on the tax from Glarus that was pledged for 400 silver marks to the Dukes of Austria; the right to initiate all pledged assets at the right bank of the lake and the Greifenberg castle (present Bäretswil) and the valley of Fischental (Tösstal). Johann's brother Rudolf received the city and castle of Laufenburg with all accessories, the Sisgau county, an estate in Reinach, and the mortgaged castle Herznach, and if Rudolf should trigger this pledge he has to his sister Agnes, a nun in the Säckingen Abbey, to pay an annuity of 14 marks of silver annually. He is committed to adhere debt of the three brothers by his personal property liability for the amount of 4300 Gulden. Gotfrid received Alt-Rapperswil with all accessories, the March and the Wägital area, the pledged property on the left bank of Zürichsee, the city of Rheinau and the Klettgau county with all accessories. Shared ownership of the three brothers was their feud; the Homberg castle and a good at Blanckenburg. Johan, Rudolf and Gotfrid confirmed that the division took place by mutual consent. In support, they ask her uncle Count Imer von Strassberg, the baron Hug von Gutenberg and knight Cuonrat Berensess who were present at the division to seal the document. Sealed by the three brothers and the three witnesses on 1 July 1354.

== Late years ==
The remains of the former Herrschaft Rapperswil – Rapperswil and some surrounding villages excluding Jona – were sold to the Habsburg family and partially (Höfe) to the city of Zürich, as the house of Rapperswil was not able to rebuild the town and the destroyed castles – the rights passed over to Albrecht II, Duke of Habsburg-Austria. All rights related to lands in the Höfe district including the settlements at Bäch, Pfäffikon and Wollerau were sold by Count Goetfrid von Habsburg-Rapperswil on 19 May 1358.

In 1352 Johann married Varenne de Neufchâtel-Blamont, the daughter of Thiébaud, Seigneur de Neuchâtel-Urtière and Blamont, Vicomte de Baume-les-Dames. They had two children: Verena and Johann (Jean) III. In fact, Johann had lost his bailiwick by the alliance of the city of Zürich and the House of Habsburg as the historical opponents of the House of Rapperswil. With his brother Rudolf IV, Johann was mentioned around 1354 and 1364 in Italy as a condottiere (military leader) for the Italian city republic of Florence. He may have come back to Switzerland in April 1372, but returned to Italy around 1375 where he may have died as a soldier.

== Aftermath ==
Johann II was called by historians as the unlucky count as he lost his bailiwick, and among others Petermann Etterlin and Aegidius Tschudi memorized the count's poem respectively song Blümli blawe (literally: "blue flower") which inspired Goethe to the ballade Das Blümlein Wunderschön – Lied des gefangenen Grafen (literally: Song by the imprisoned Count); referring to Count Johann's imprisonment in Zürich between 1350 and 1352.

== See also ==
- Elisabeth von Rapperswil
- Johann I

== Literature ==
- Erwin Eugster: Adlige Territorialpolitik in der Ostschweiz. Kirchliche Stiftungen im Spannungsfeld früher landesherrlicher Verdrängungspolitik. Zürich 1991, ISBN 3-90527-868-5.
- Roger Sablonier: Gründungszeit ohne Eidgenossen: Politik und Gesellschaft in der Innerschweiz um 1300. hier + jetzt, Baden 2008, ISBN 978-3-03919-085-0.
