= Reichsvogt =

Office of a Vogt that was nominated as the Roman Empire representative

Reichsvogt (German: [ˈʁaɪçsˌfoːkt]; Imperial Advocate) was the term for the office of a Vogt that was nominated by the king of the Holy Roman Empire as his representative. Especially in what is now Switzerland, the Reichsvogt was a very influential position in the High Middle Ages.

== Function and rights ==
The Reichsvogt was patron, chairman of the blood court and administrator of the emperor of the Holy Roman Empire acting with imperial rights. These included the territory under the direct reign of the emperor, and the imperial cities and imperial monasteries, among them medieval Zürich and the Fraumünster Abbey, that were directly subordinate to the emperor, and not to individual dominions or churches and monasteries.

== Switzerland ==
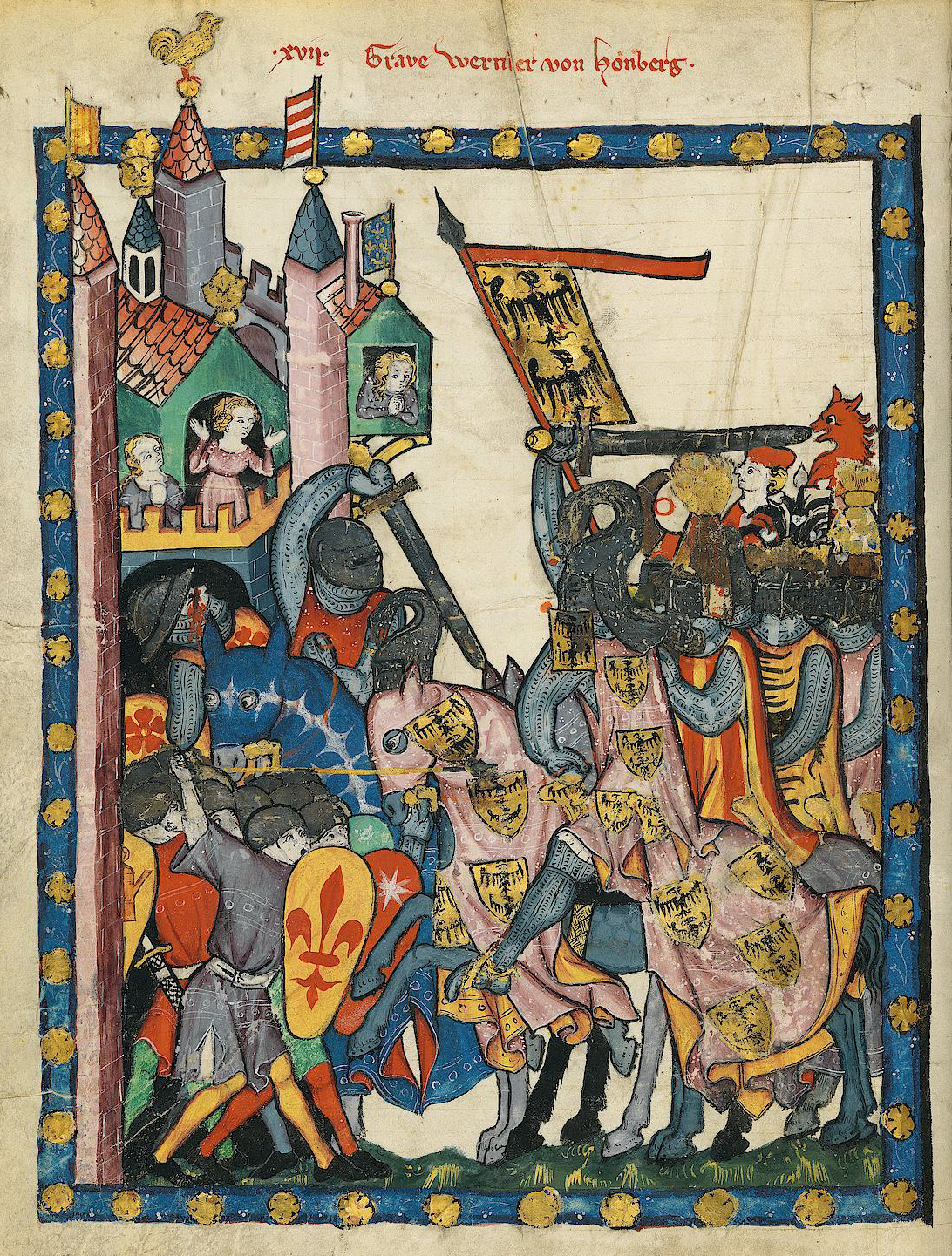
Count Wernher von Homberg-Rapperswil, Reichsvogt of the Waldstätte from 1309 to 1320, Codex Manesse folio 43v.

In addition to the imperial cities of Basel, Bern, St. Gallen, Schaffhausen, Solothurn and Zürich, as well as the imperial monasteries Disents, Einsiedeln, Fraumünster and Grossmünster in Zürich, and the St. Gallen Abbey territories, the Reichsvogt acted as the secular court. These extensive imperial complexes were directly subordinate to the king, especially in the Old Swiss Confederacy and in the Western Switzerland.

By the 12th century, the latter were grouped into imperial bailiwicks respectively imperial fiefs to local barons, among them the houses of Zähringen, Kyburg, Rapperswil and Toggenburg. In the 13th century, imperial bailiwicks were propagated fiefdom of large dynasties, Savoy and Habsburg, alongside their officials perceived the imperial rights as Reichsvögte (plural). Zürich, for instance, in 1218 received the status as Reichsstadt, an imperial city, and chose its first Reichsvogt from the urban citizenry, which exercised the advocacy of the two pins and the city. Zürich mostly sat his counselors as Reichsvogt and county judge in personal union, but from the middle of the 13th century the town's rights were ousted more and more by the Habsburg family.

In general, the Reichsvogt and comparable Schultheiß increasingly dealt, in addition to the jurisdiction, and walked up to the mayors at the head of the city's council. In the 15th century the office of Reichsvogt successively was acquired e.g. in 1400 in Zürich, St. Gallen in 1415, Schaffhausen in 1415/29, and the Reichsvogt became the chairman or executive officers of the blood court. The title Reichsvogt survived in St. Gallen and Appenzell Innerrhoden (1606–1872) by the late 19th century.

== See also ==
- Vogt (Switzerland)

== Literature ==
- Erwin Eugster: Adlige Territorialpolitik in der Ostschweiz. Kirchliche Stiftungen im Spannungsfeld früher landesherrlicher Verdrängungspolitik. Zürich 1991, ISBN 3-90527-868-5.
- Roger Sablonier: Gründungszeit ohne Eidgenossen: Politik und Gesellschaft in der Innerschweiz um 1300. hier + jetzt, Baden 2008, ISBN 978-3-03919-085-0.
