= Gossau =

Gossau can mean either of two municipalities of Switzerland:

- Gossau, St. Gallen, a city of 17,000 inhabitants
- Gossau, Zürich, a town of 9,000 inhabitants

Gossauer may refer to:

- the inhabitants of either of the municipalities above
- Alwina Gossauer (1841–1926), a Swiss women professional photographer and businesswoman from Rapperswil
