= Rathaus Rapperswil =

Government building in Rapperswil, Switzerland

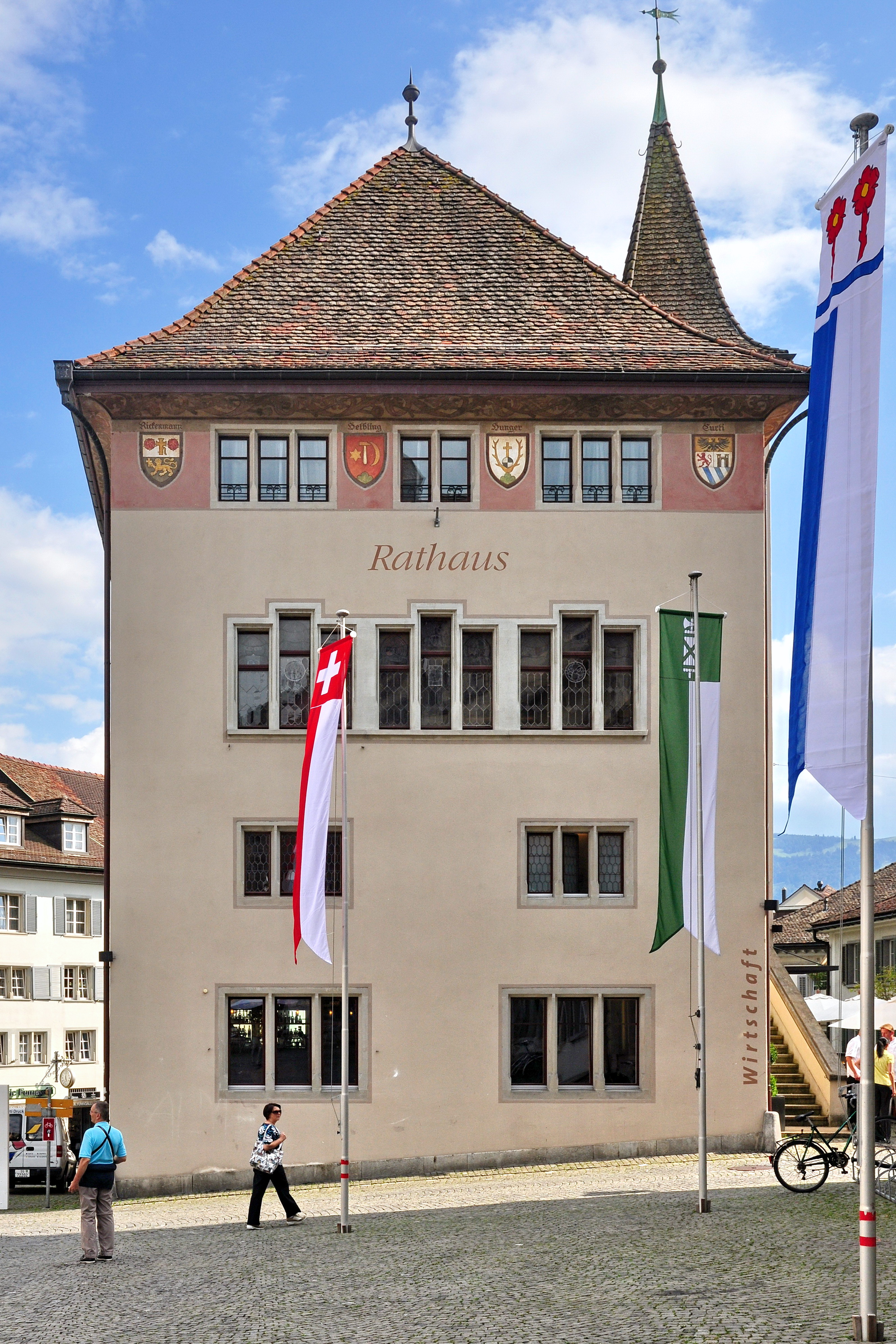
- Rathaus Rapperswil at Hauptplatz plaza as seen from the east towards Neue Jonastrasse
- Interactive map of Rathaus Rapperswil
- 47°13′35″N 8°48′59″E
- Location: Hauptplatz 1, CH-8640 Rapperswil

History
- Built: probably built as a tower of the town wall around 1220 AD, built in its present form around 1470

Site notes
- Architectural style: European Medieval
- Governing body: Ortsgemeinde Rapperswil

Rathaus Rapperswil is the former Rathaus of the city government of medieval town of Rapperswil, Canton of St. Gallen in Switzerland. Today, the building houses a café and restaurant, the city archives and a collection of stained glass windows, silverware and paintings. The building and the city archives are listed in the Swiss inventory of cultural property of national and regional significance.

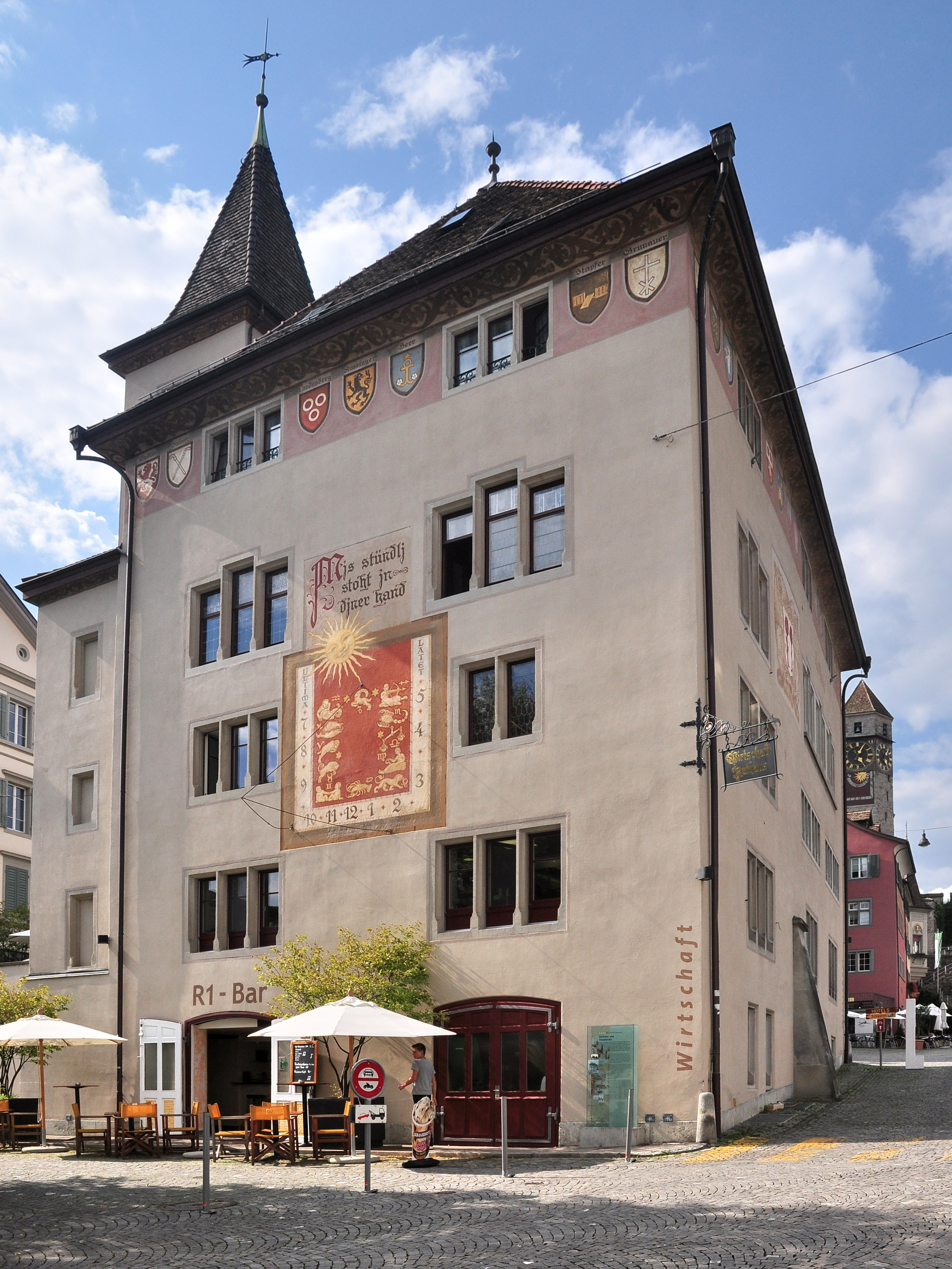
As seen from the south

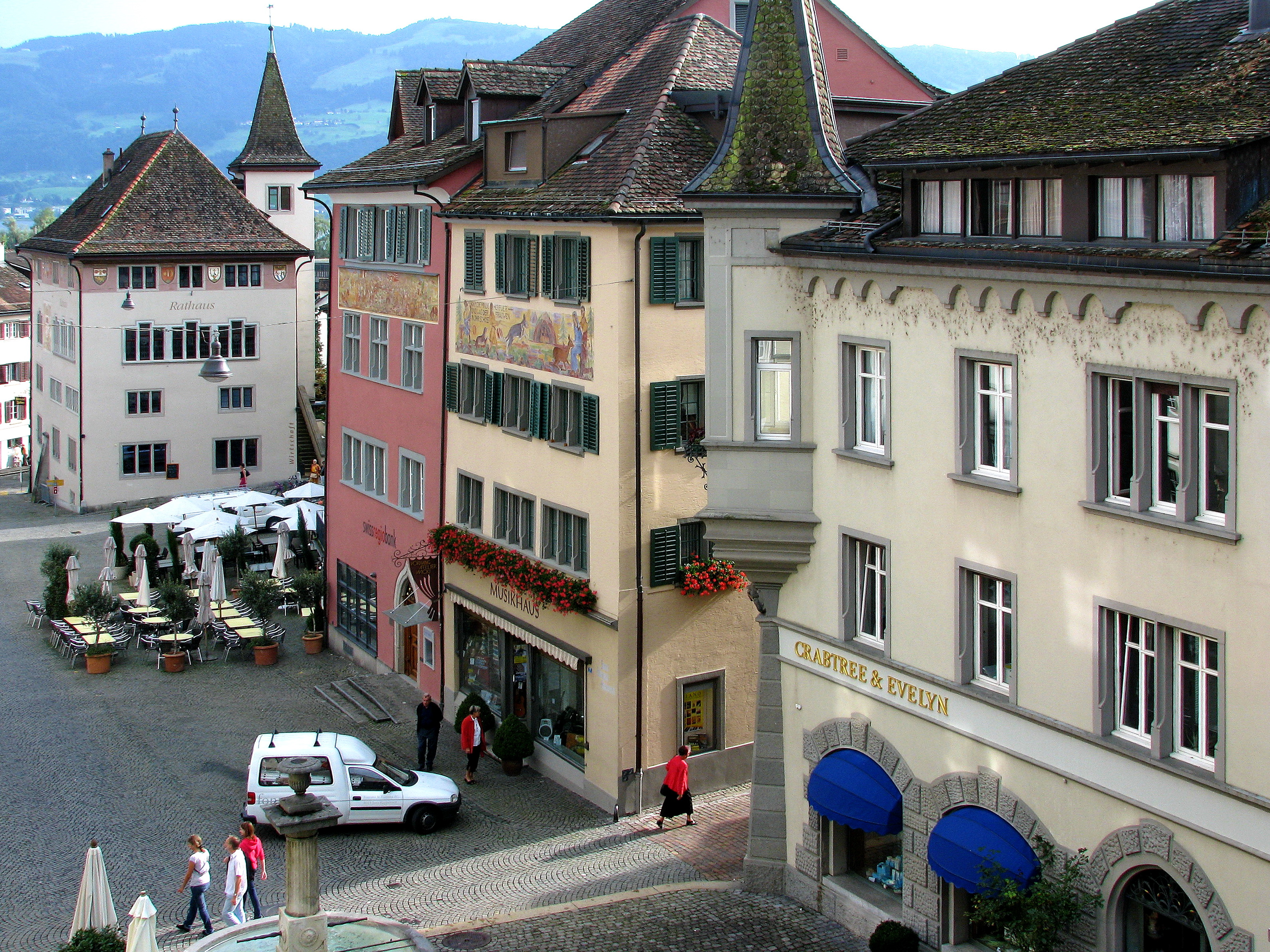
Rathaus Rapperswil and Hauptplatz (main square) as seen from nearby Liebfrauenkapelle respectively Rapperswil Castle

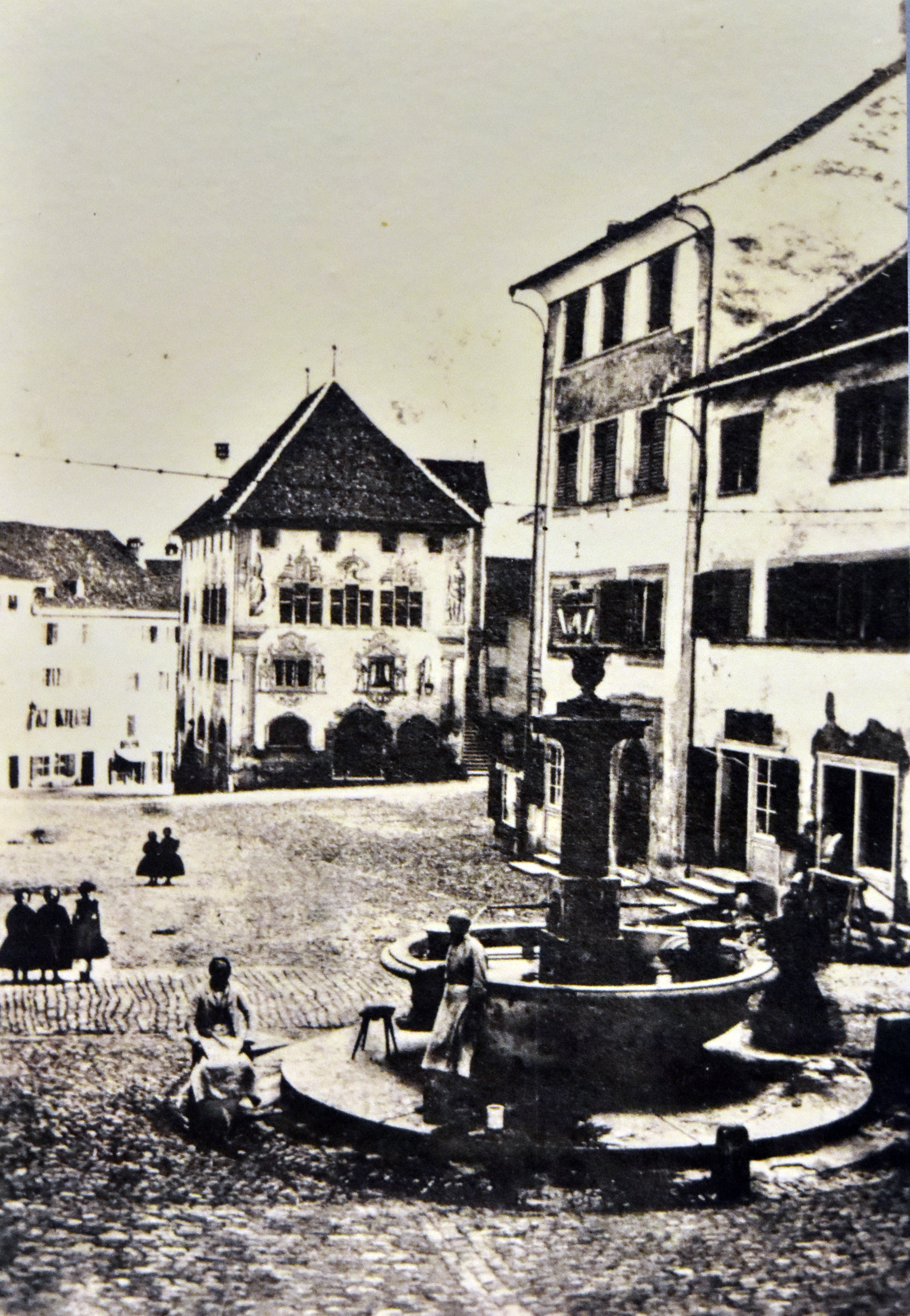
1865 photograph taken by Alwina Gossauer, showing the Hauptplatz square and the Rathaus building, as seen from Schlosstreppe; the oldest known photography of Rapperswil.

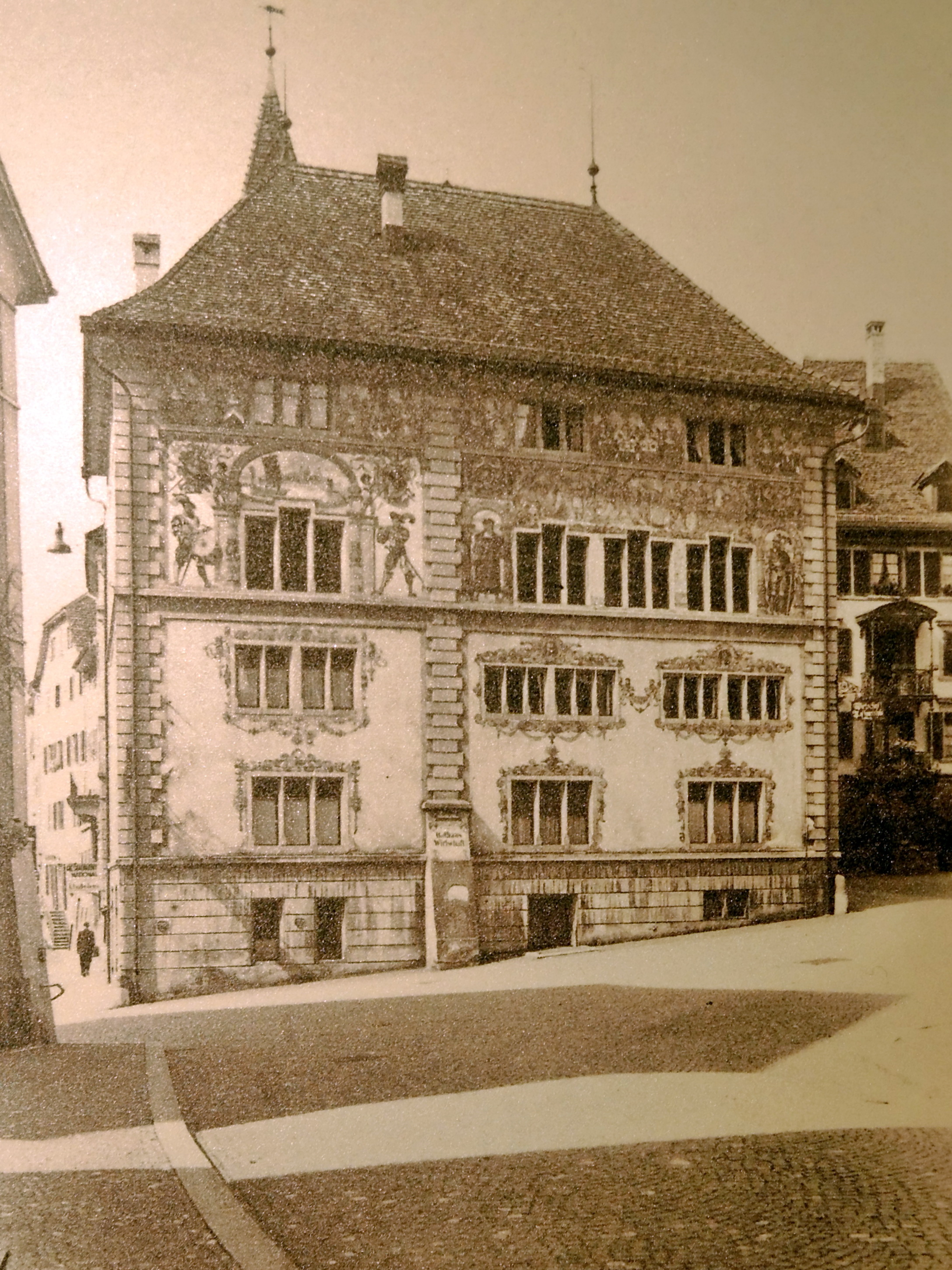
as seen from Hauptplatz square in 1902

== Location ==
The Rathaus is located within the Altstadt of Rapperswil at the Hauptplatz, the main square of the medieval town. The building replaced an earlier fortified tower probably built in the early 13th century by the House of Rapperswil as part of the former town wall that in the first construction phase stretched from the castle and parish church on the Lindenhof hill towards the present Einsiedlerhaus on Zürichsee lake shore. The Rathaus building belongs to the Ortsgemeinde Rapperswil, the citizen's association. On Wednesdays, it also houses the Bezirksgericht See-Gaster (district tribunal) in the so-called Ratssaal on the second floor. The present Rathaus building houses a café and restaurant in the ground and first floor, the city archives on the third floor, and a collection of stained glass windows, silverware and paintings made by artists from Rapperswil on the second floor.

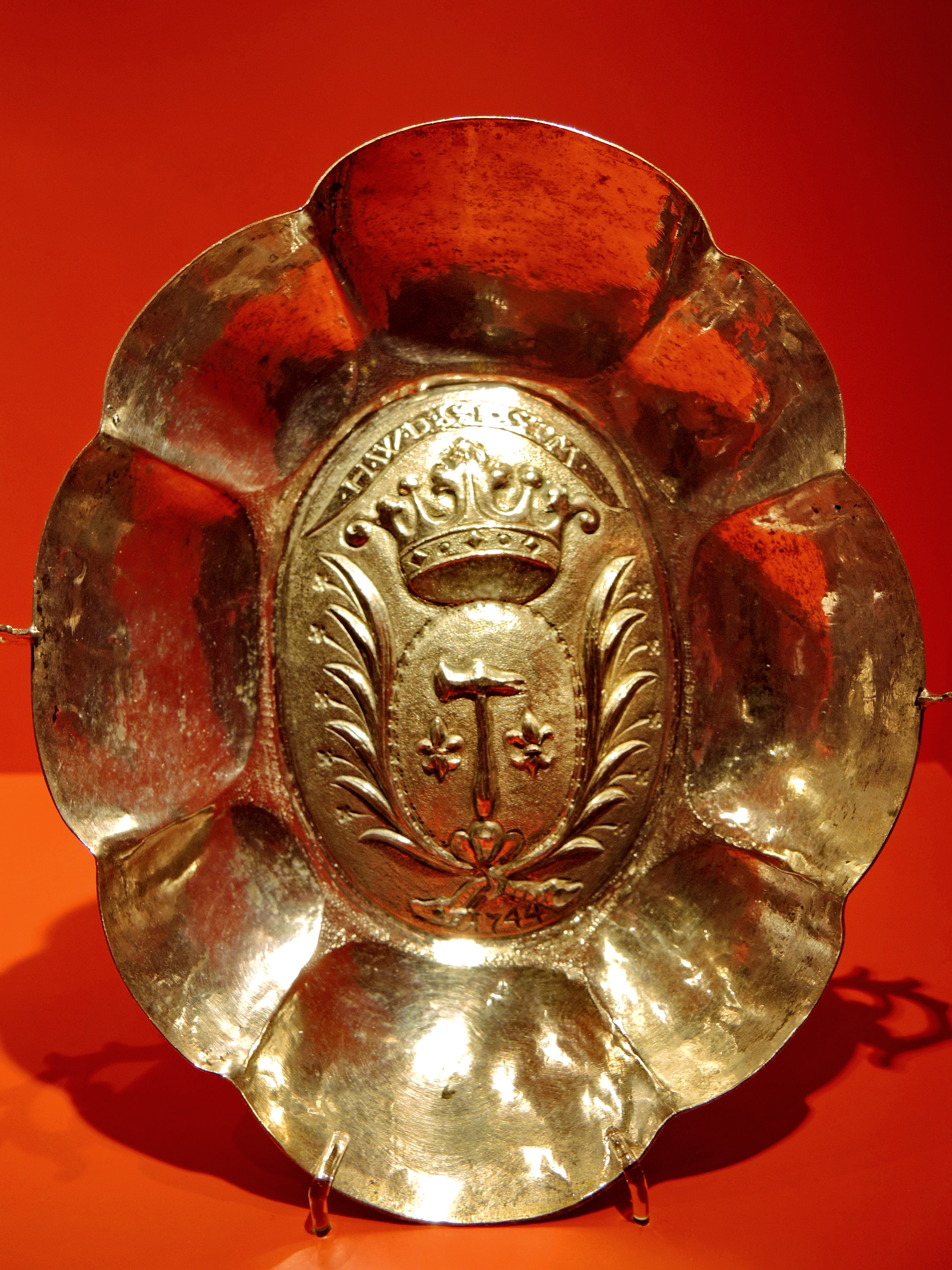
Silverware of the collection, 1744

== Architecture ==
=== Exterior ===
The Rapperswil "rat- oder richthus is first mentioned in 1419. The building replaced an earlier fortified tower that was part of the former town wall that in the first construction phase stretched from the castle and parish church on the Lindenhof hill towards the present Einsiedlerhaus on Zürichsee lake shore. The first building at that location was probably built in the early 13th century by the Rudolf II von Rapperswil. The building in its present form dates around 1470. In 1614/15 the southern tower was added. Conversions respectively renewals were carried out in 1866 and 1895. In 1902 a further floor was added and the comprehensive wall decorations with figural and heraldic motifs (as shown on Alwina Gossauer's photograph of 1865 and that of 1901) on the west side were widely removed. Renewed conversions resulted in 1946/47, 1998/99 and 2007 to the present, rather plain appearance by largely removing of the elaborate decorations at the basements, except the south-facing sundial and the coat of arms under the ceiling.

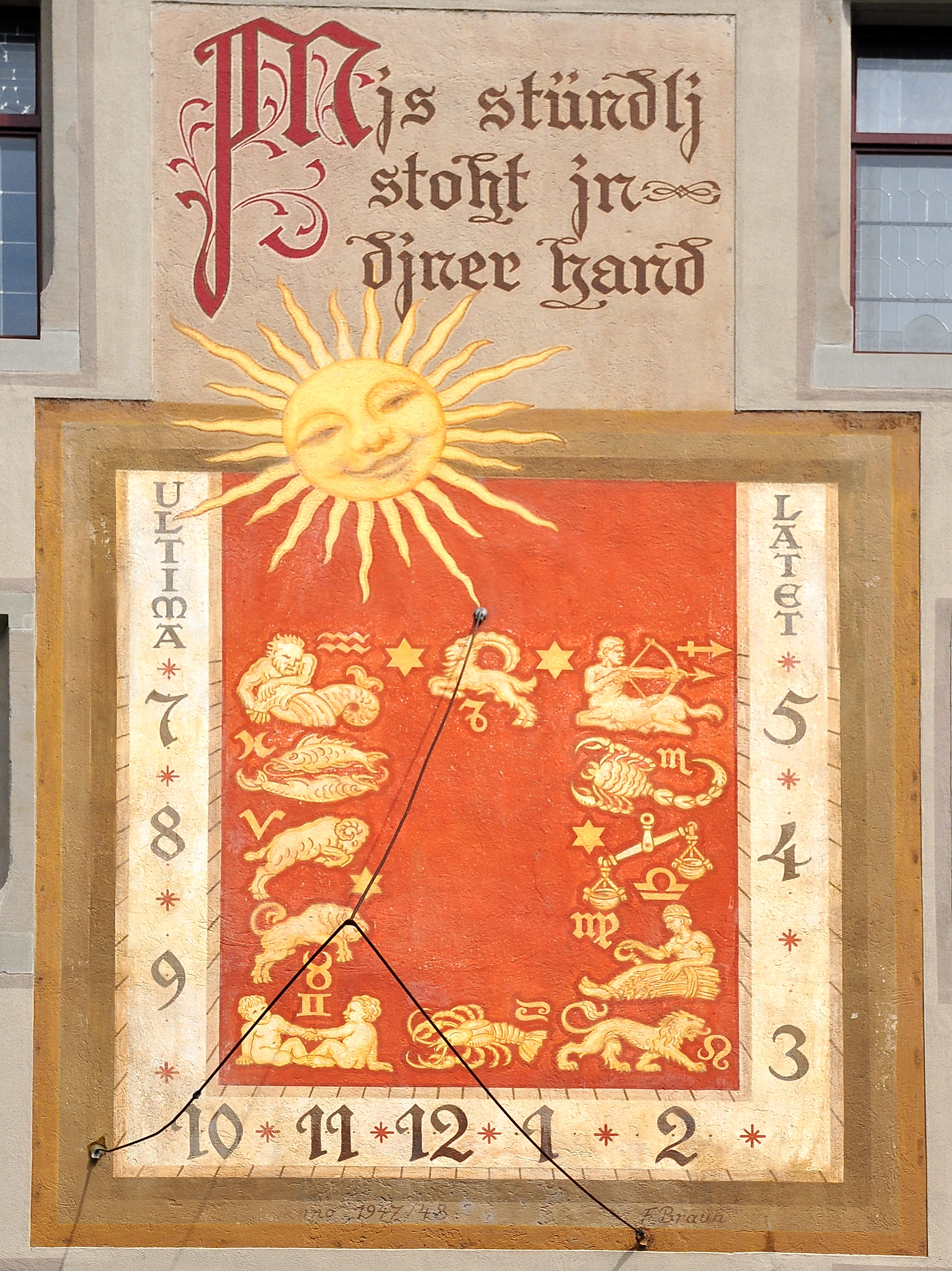
sunclock on the southern exterior wall

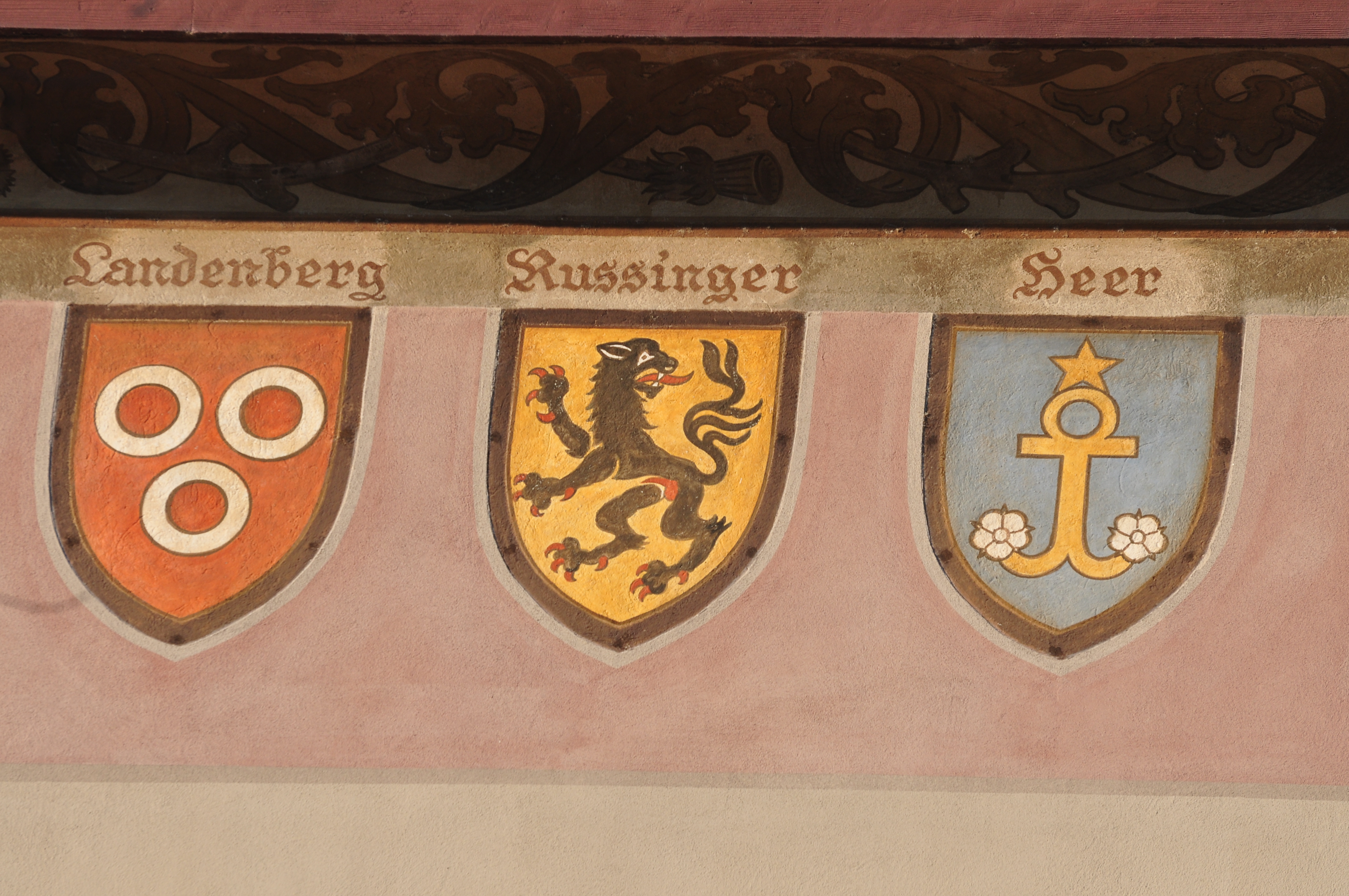
coats of arms of families from Rapperswil, among them Landenberg, Russinger, Heer ...

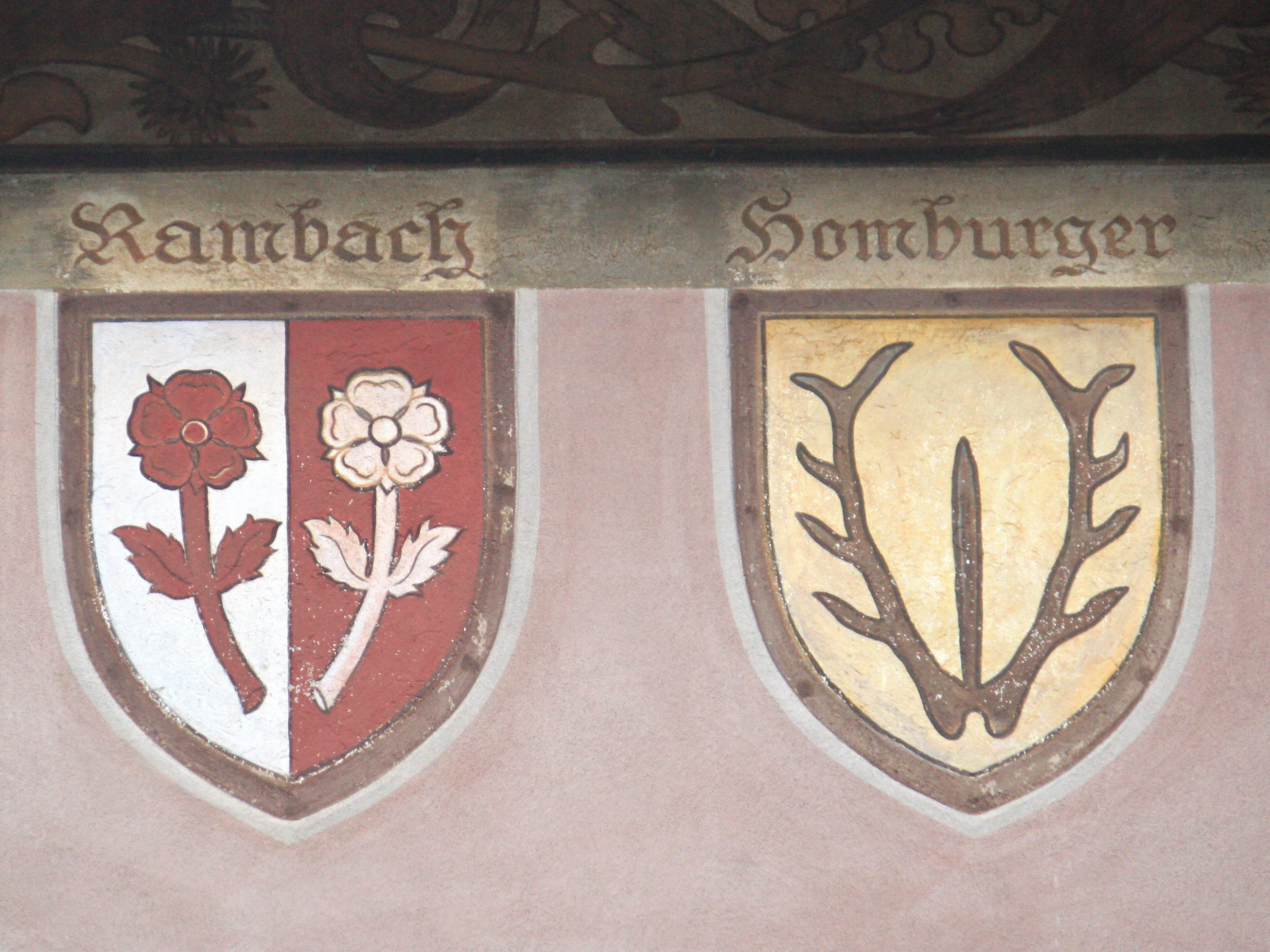
... Rambach and Homburger...

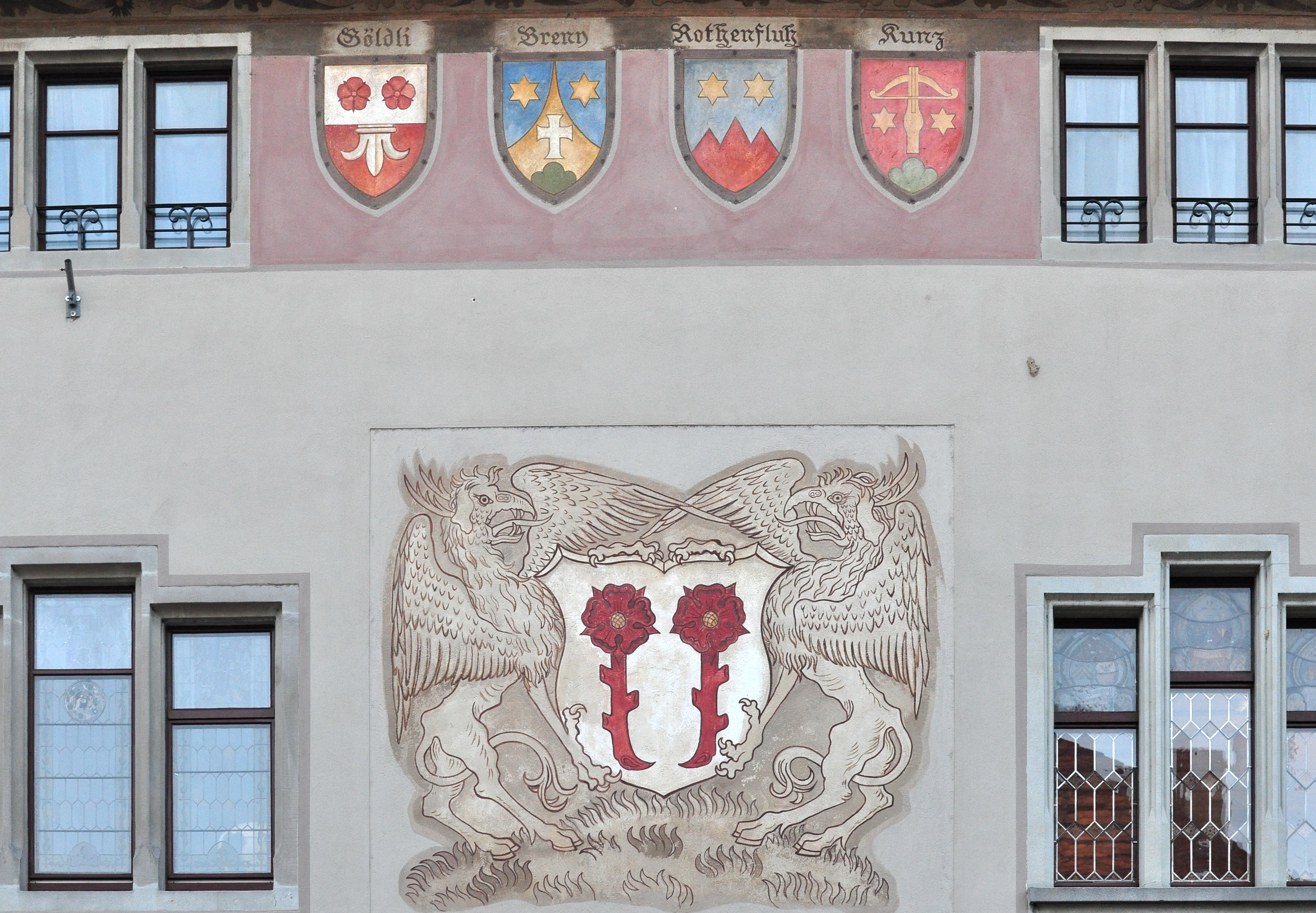
... and Göldli, Breny, Rothenfluh and Kunz, as well the House of Rapperswil and the gryfinn symbolizing the early family line Landenberg

=== Interior ===
The late Gothic portal to the council chamber (Ratssaal) was made from a single oak tree; the double-sided bow kell is richly profiled. A cast-iron Renaissance stove (year 1572 engraved) is the most representative piece of the hall's equipment. The small exposition includes the gold and silver treasure which is exhibited in the Stadtmuseum Rapperswil-Jona, the circular council table made by Conrad Lütbrand in 1618, paintings by the Rapperswil artists Felix Maria Diogg and Johann Michael Hunger, and the stained glass windows. In the entrance hall on the first floor, there is shown the golden banner given by Pope Julius II to the citizens of Rapperswil who supported his military campaign in the Lombardy against the French king in 1512. Further sights include the former supraporta of the Schloss Rapperswil, also as a fresco on the eastern wall. The Ratssaal houses the Bezirksgericht court on Wednesday, in the neighboring Richterstübli the local board of directors meet and it is also used as ceremonial hall for weddings.

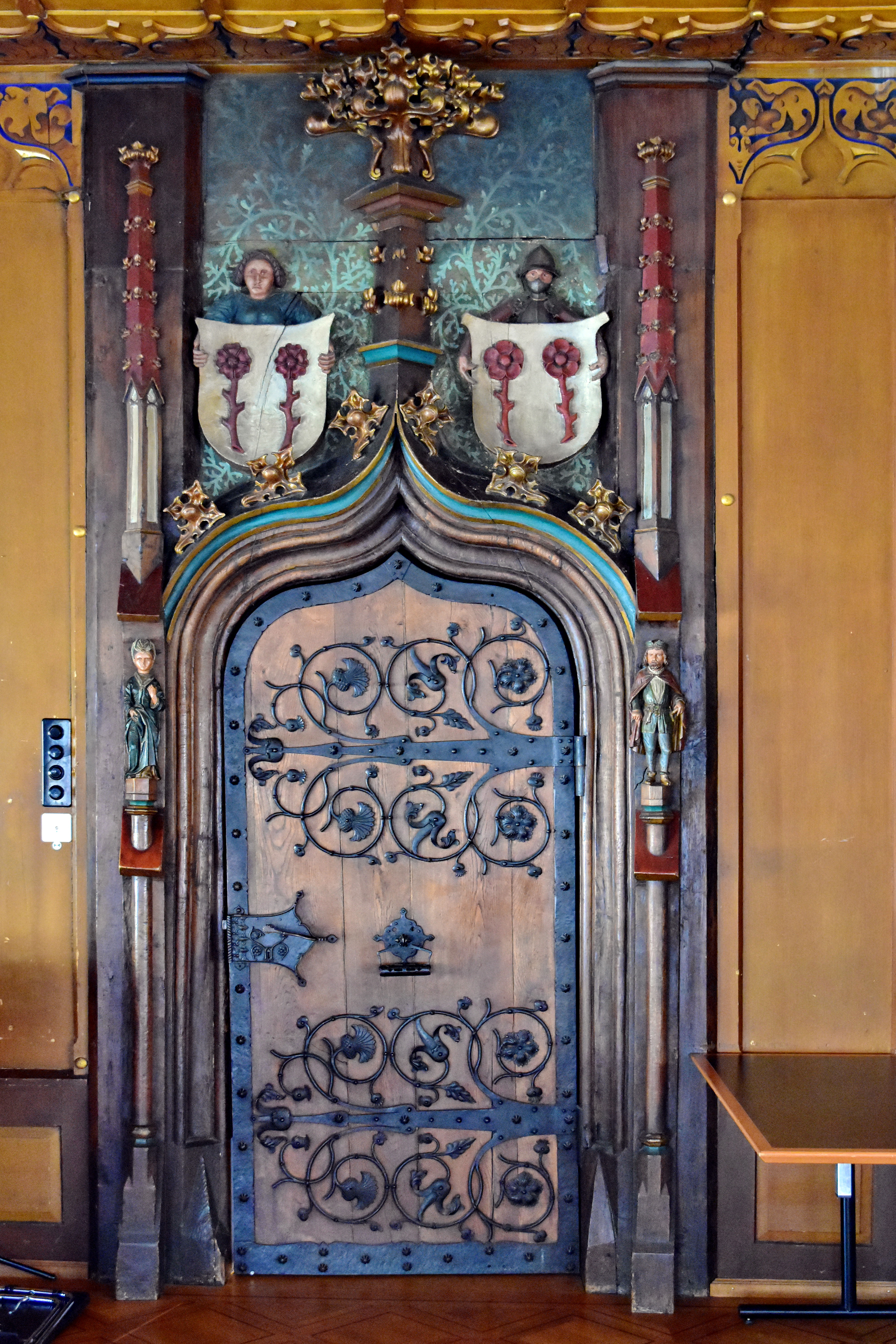
portal to the Ratssaal room

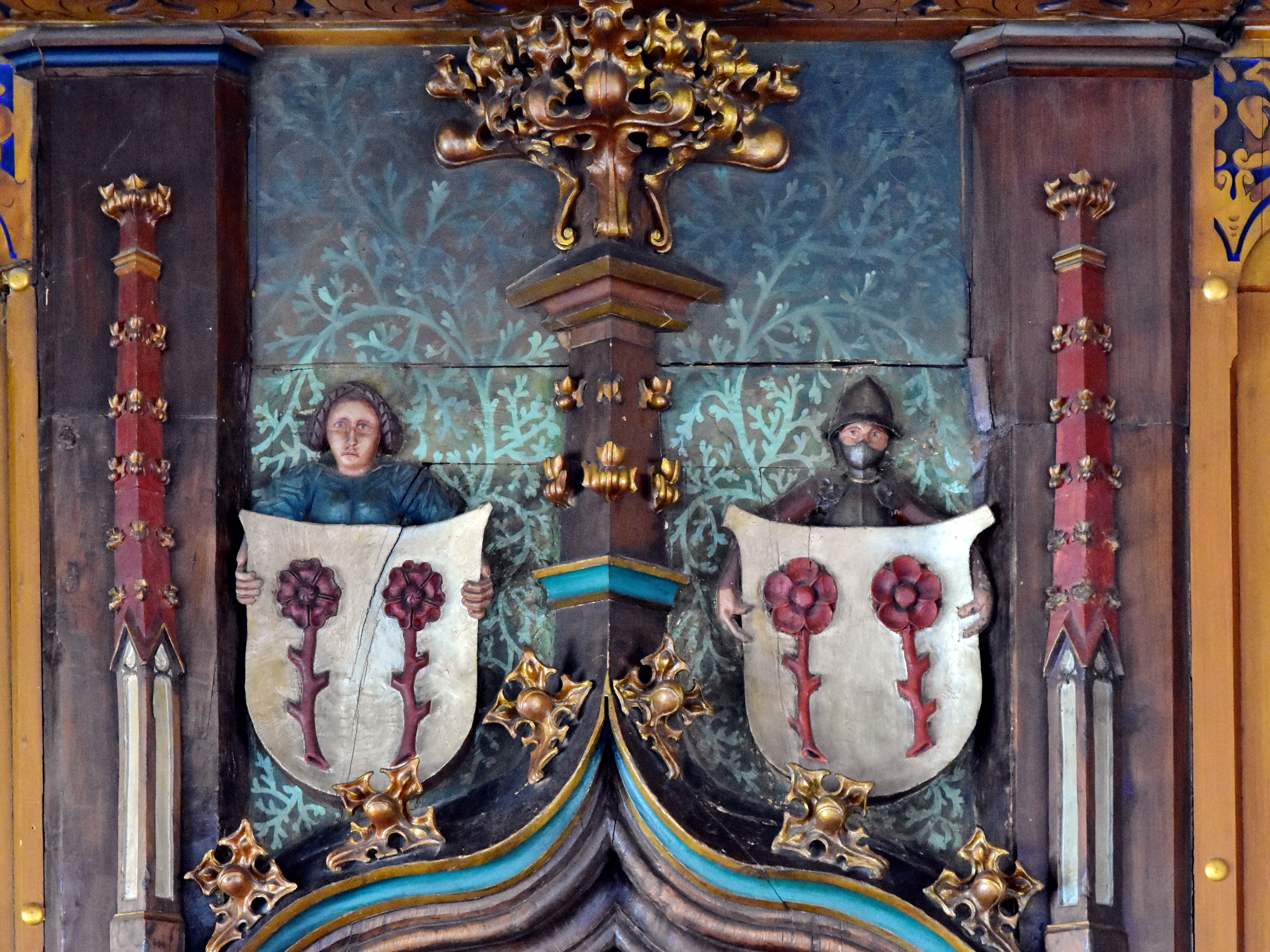
detail view of the portal

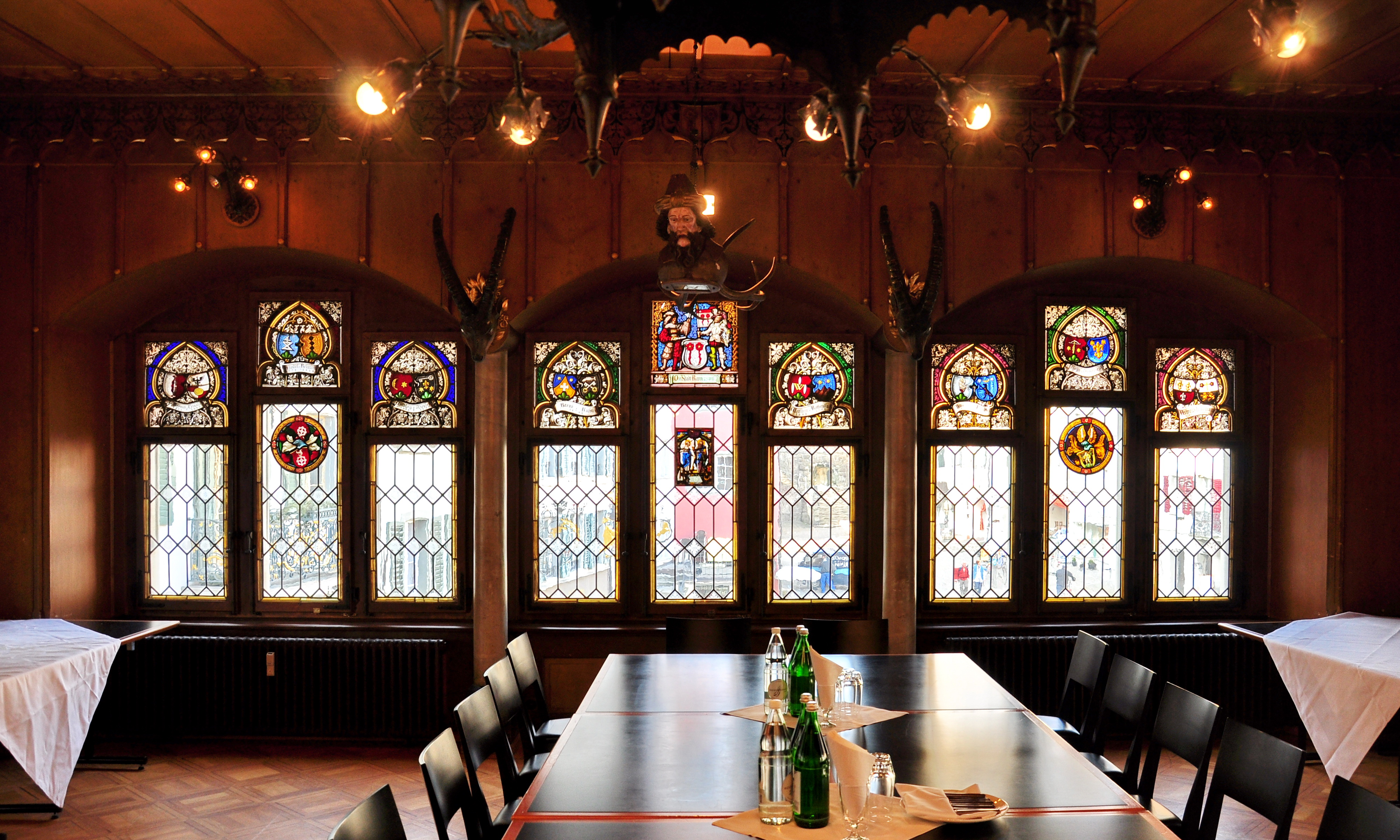
Ratssaal and its stained glass windows

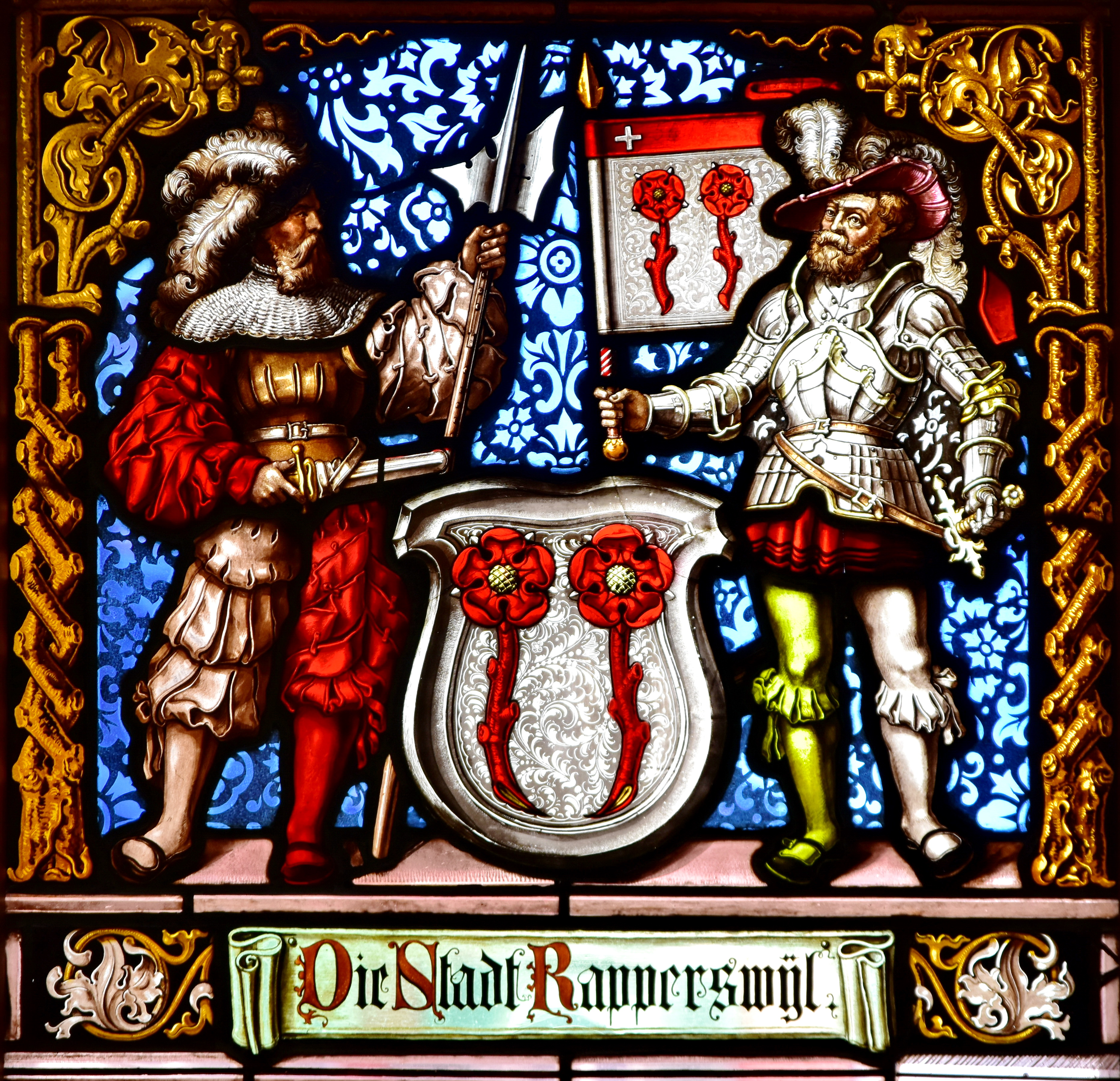
detail, coats of arms of Rapperswil

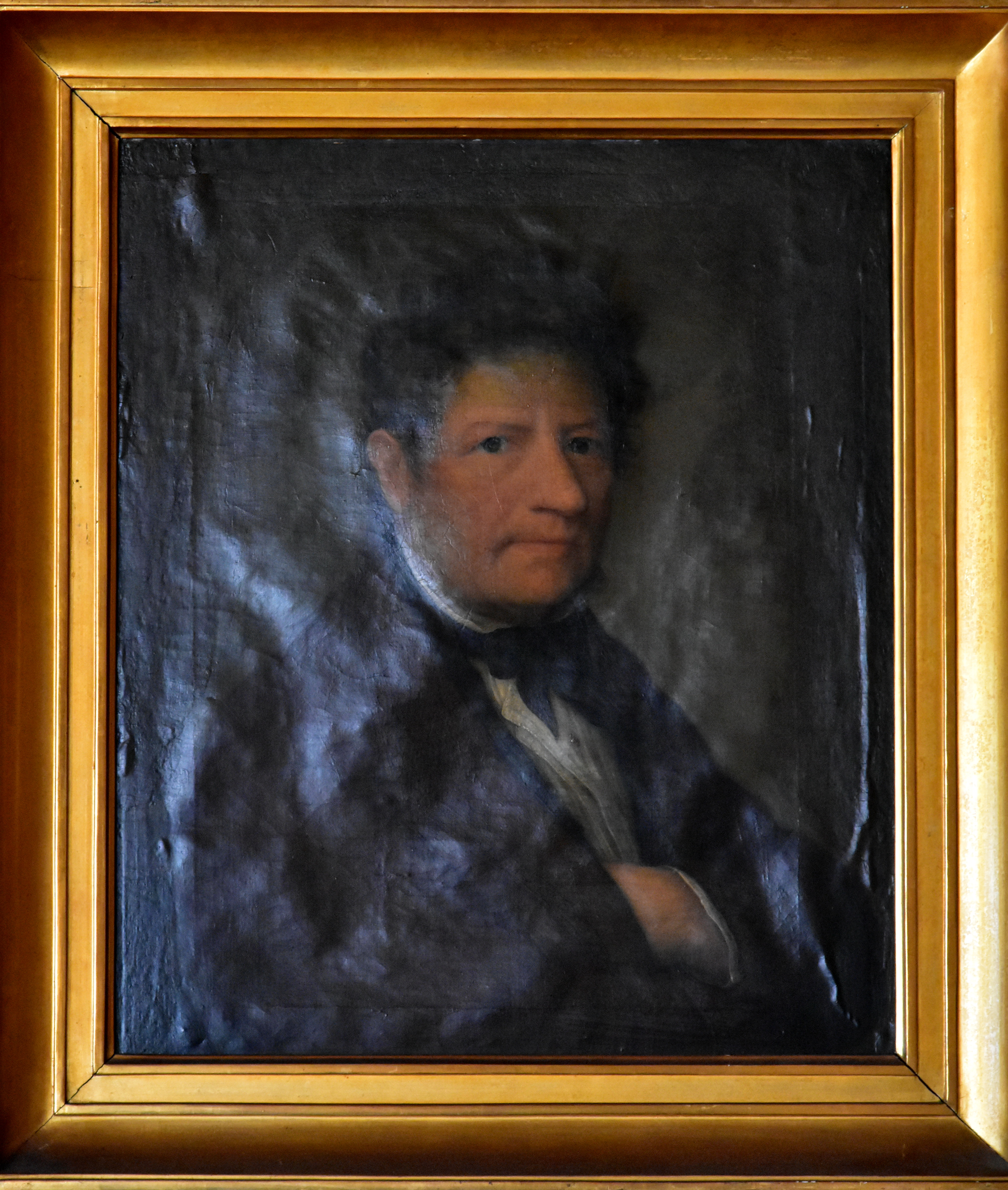
Felix Maria Diogg, selfportrait, Raatssaal

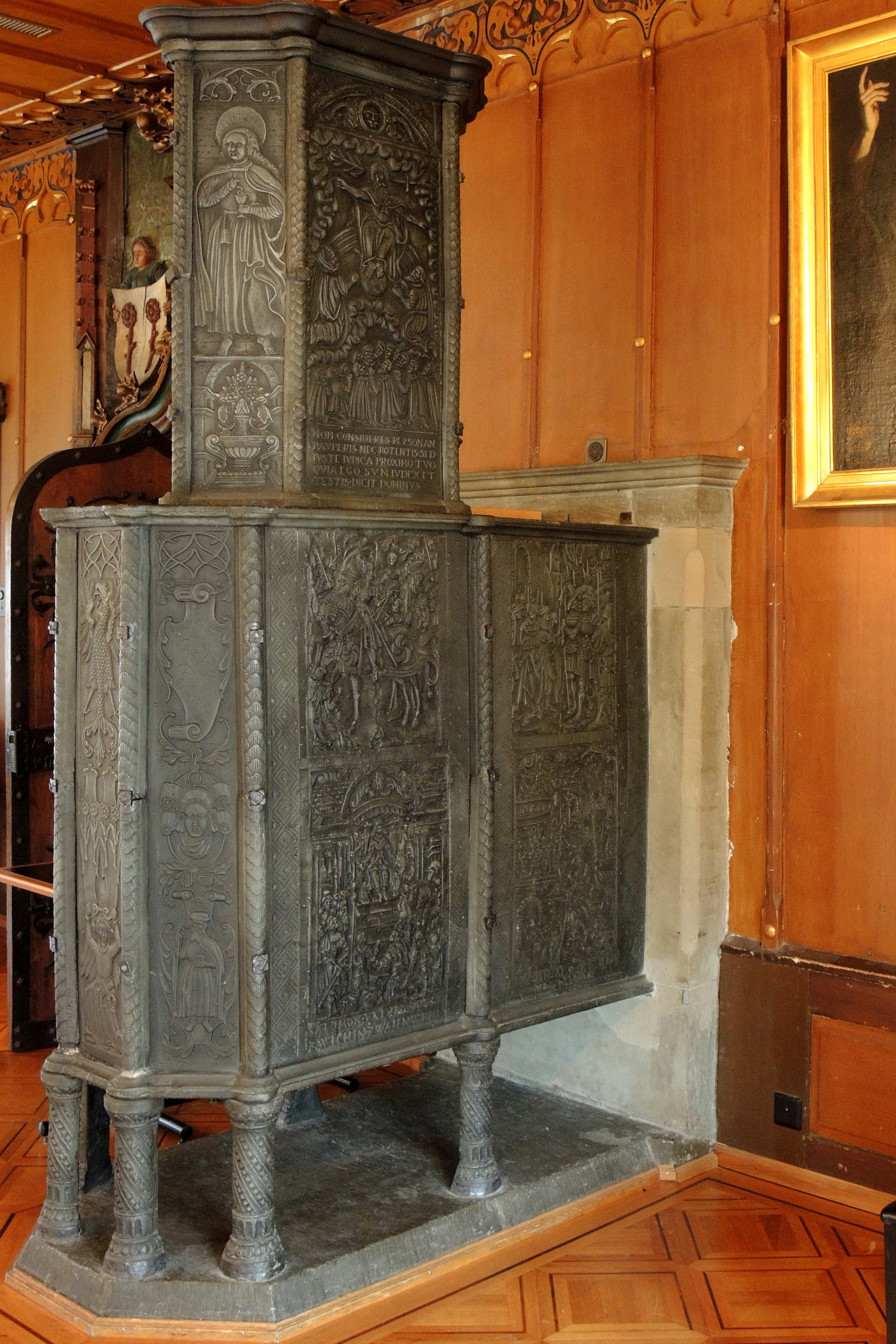
Renaissance stove of 1572

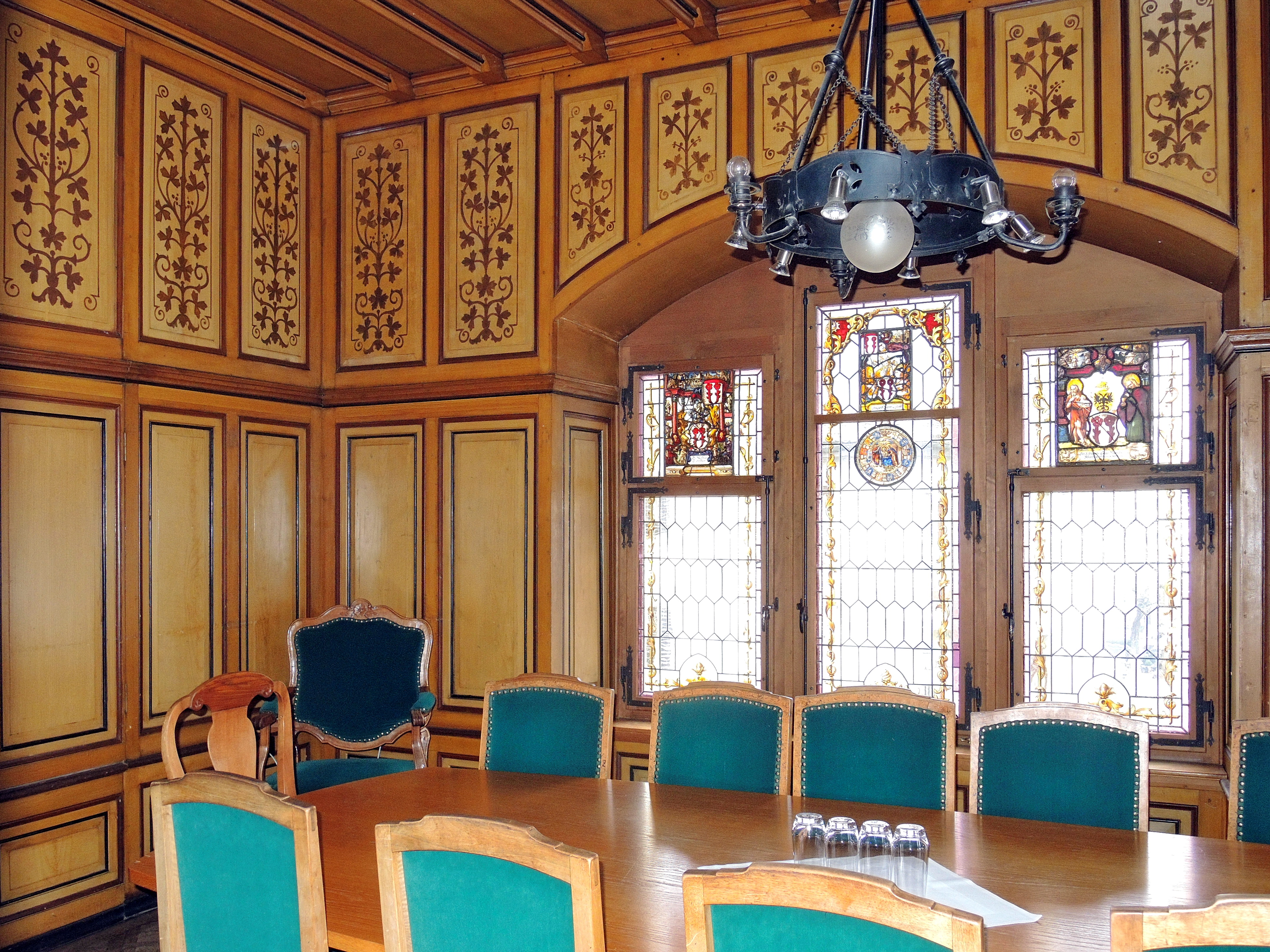
Richterstübli

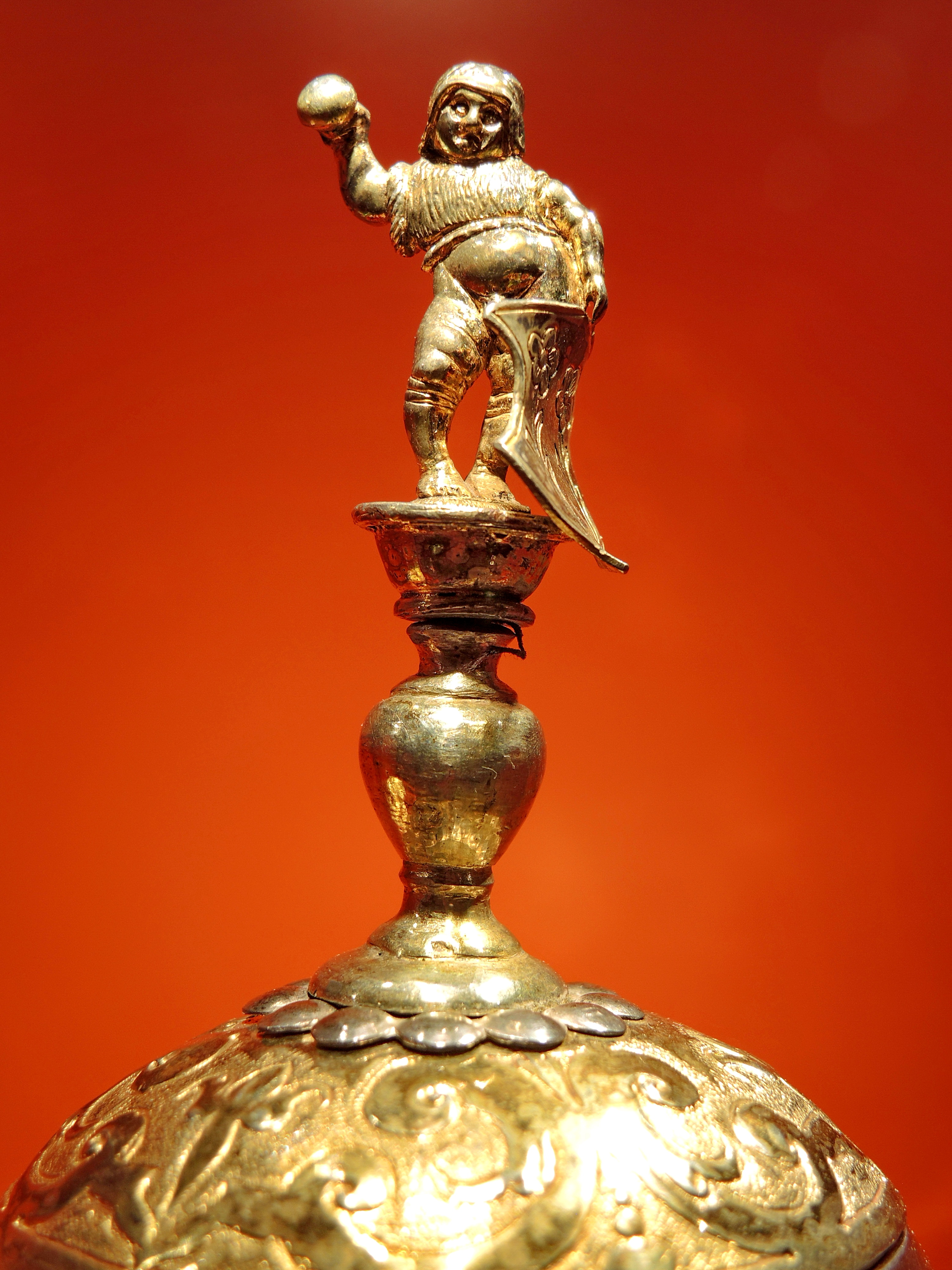
a present from the Pfäfers Abbey to the council of Rapperswil in 1614, exhibit in the Stadtmuseum Rapperswil-Jona

== Stadtarchiv Rapperswil ==
After the establishment of the canton of St. Gallen in 1803, the then autonomous municipalities of Rapperswil and Jona had their own municipal archives (German: Stadtarchiv). As a result of the merger of the two political communities in 2007, the entire historical material until 1900 or 1950 will be stored at one site. As per August 2015, the city archives of Rapperswil (German: Stadtarchiv der Ortsgemeinde Rapperswil-Jona since 2007) therefore includes the historical documents of Rapperswil and Jona and its successors, mainly of the former Herrschaft Rapperswil, a bailiwick, and of the House of Rapperswil. The city archives of the political community and the so-called Ortsgemeinde (citizenry) consist of several thousand documents, among them council and court records, some predominantly chronicles handwritten by clergymen, parish books and so on. Attached are the photo archives and the puncture and plan collection comprising some audio and film documents from the recent past, as well as private estates and a library, also location-based publications, including newspaper articles about Rapperswil since around 1950. The contents of the archives are accessible by telephone reservation.

== History ==
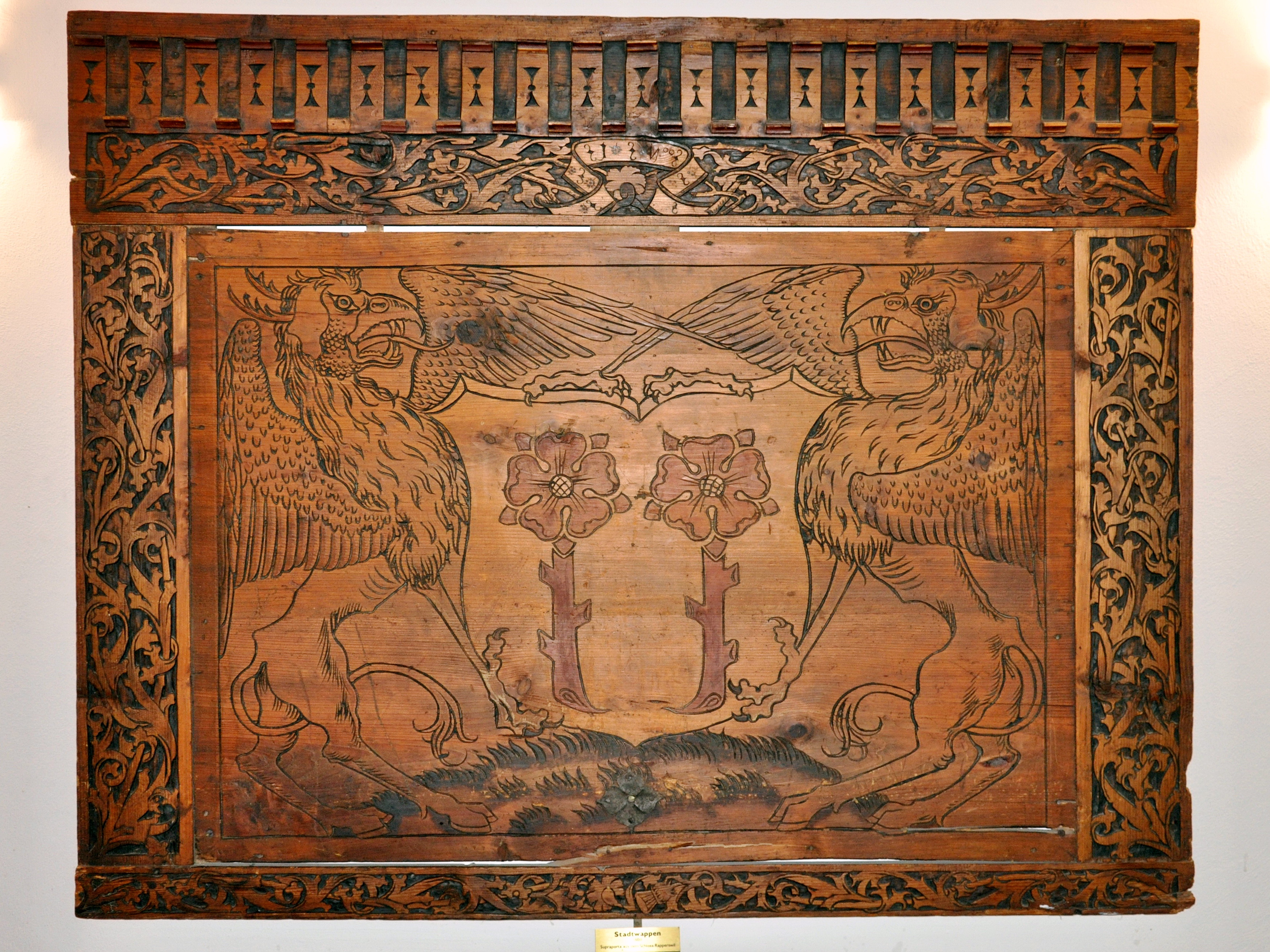
Supraporta, once on the main gate of the Rapperswil Castle

A first council and mayor (Schultheiss) in the medieval town of Rapperswil may be suspected for the period after its founding around 1220 AD. The earliest document sealed at the Rapperswil Castle, related to the donation of the church of Bollingen to the Rüti Abbey, mentions among others a civitas as witnesses of Count Rudolf von Rapperswil in 1229. Between 1267 and 1282, when the fiefs were given back by the German king to Elisabeth von Rapperswil, the citizens, clergy and nobility executed the representatives of Elisabeth's brother Count Rudolf III who died in 1267. The seal of the town of Rapperswil respectively citizenry first appeared in 1277. In 1337 Johann I von Laufenburg-Rapperswil died, that's probably why in 1341 the court council (German: Kleiner Rat) consisting of 12 members and the mayor (German: Schultheiss) was first mentioned in Rapperswil; since 1415 the council also appointed the Vogt of the Wurmsbach Abbey, a foundation of Countess Elisabeth's father and mother. Johann II von Laufenburg-Rapperswil had to sell Rapperswil and all rights to Habsburg in the late 1350s; Rudolf IV, Duke of Austria, who rebuilt Rapperswil after the war with the city of Zürich and also re-established the prehistorical and Roman era lake crossing at the Seedamm isthmus, granted the citizenry the related customs legislation in 1360. King Wenceslas securitized liberation from foreign courts in 1379, and in 1406 the citizenry was allowed to elect their mayor. For the first time in 1442, the bicameral city government, being composed of the 12-seat Kleiner Rat and the 24-seat Grosser Rat, exercised the blood jurisdiction under the chairmanship of the mayor. Since 1481 the grand council was elected by the members of Kleiner Rat. Council genders include among others the Landenberg, Russinger (Russikon), Göldlin, Breny, Rothenfluh and Kunz families.

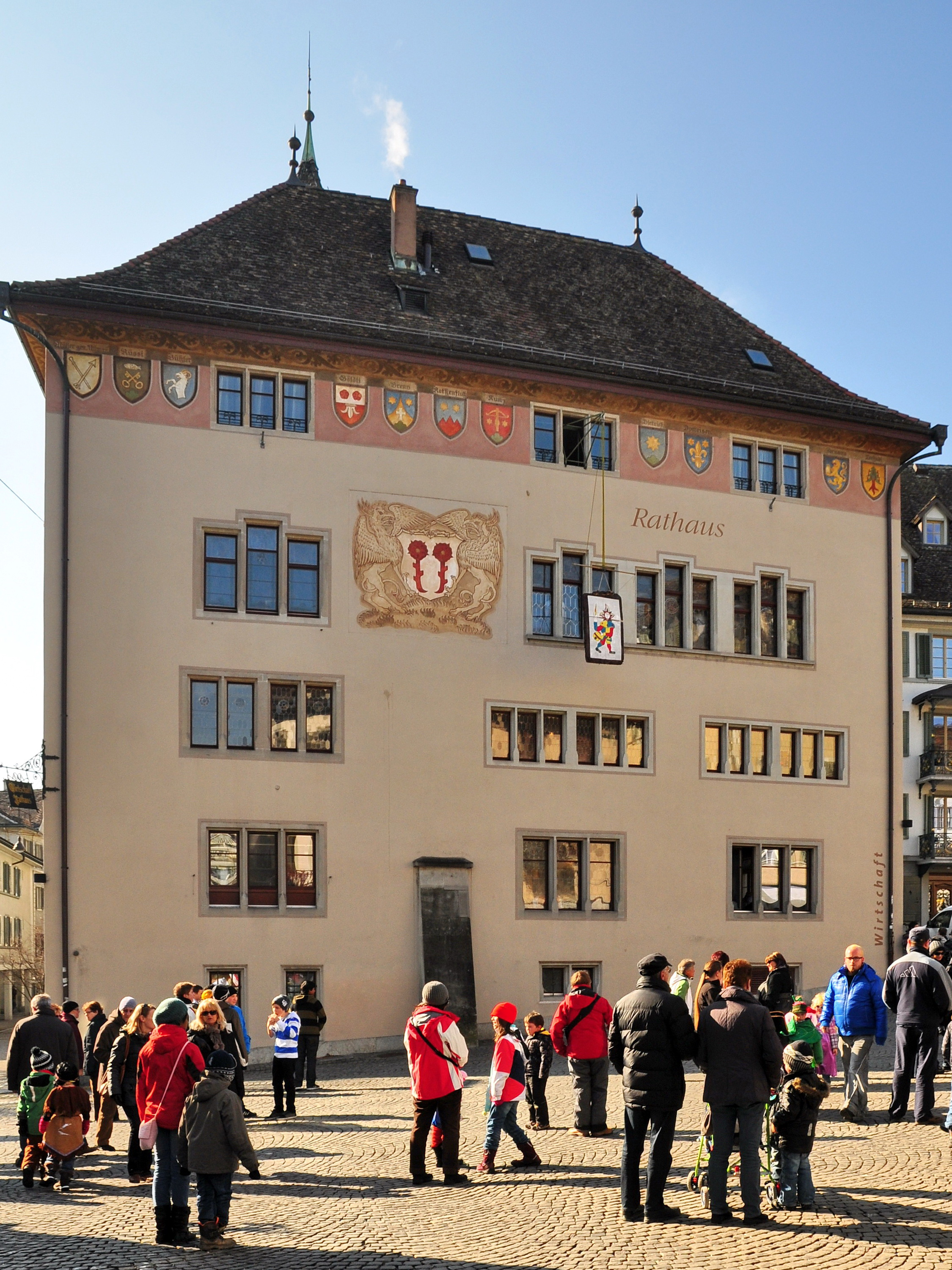
Eis-zwei-Geissebei celebrated on Shrove Tuesday at Hauptplatz plaza

For centuries the building served as the seat of the government respectively Rat (council) and later as the seat of the mayor (Bürgermeister) of Rapperswil ending on 31 December 2006, when the former independent cities of Jona and Rapperswil merged to form the municipality of Rapperswil-Jona. Since 1 January 2007, the Stadthaus Rapperswil-Jona that is situated in Jona, is the town hall of the municipality. Besides the restaurant, the city archives and the art exhibition, the Rathaus building is the center of an ancient Carnival festival: on Shrove Tuesday the traditional Herrenessen, the dinner of the council members and cabaret program with distinguished guests, is celcebrated on occasion of Eis-zwei-Geissebei when hundreds of children gather at the main square (Hauptplatz). Following the so-called Austeilete by the council members to the children, in the evening all regional Guggenmusik (carnival marching bands) gather at Hauptplatz and on Lindenhof at Schloss Rapperswil to celebrate a roaring concert.

== Cultural heritage ==
Rathaus Rapperswil is listed in the Swiss inventory of cultural property of national and regional significance as a Class A object of national importance, and its archives as Class B object of regional importance.

== Literature ==
- Peter Röllin: Kulturbaukasten Rapperswil-Jona. Rapperswil-Jona 2005. ISBN 3-033-00478-4
