= Felix Maria Diogg =

Swiss painter

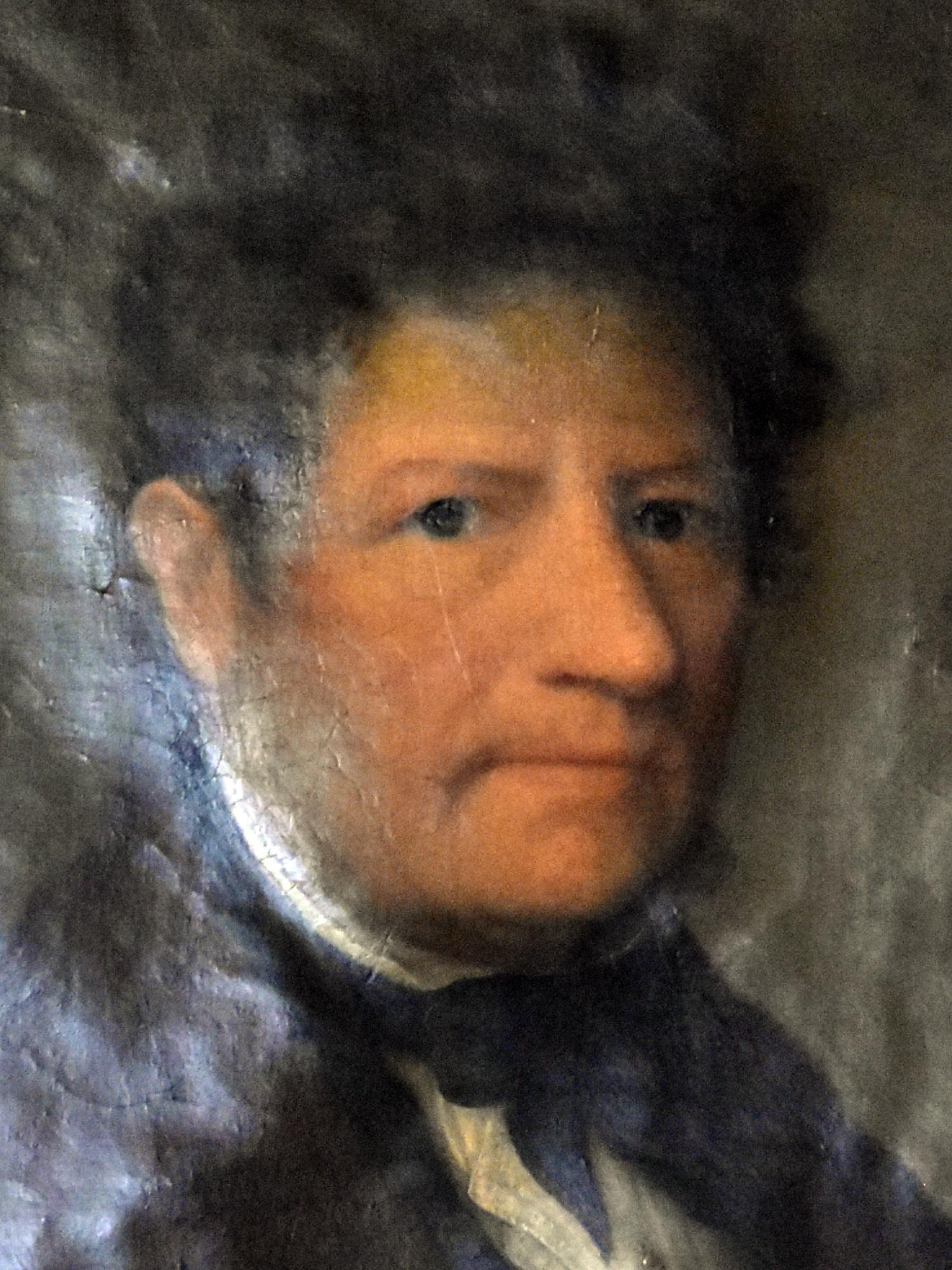
- Self-portrait around 1830, Rathaus Rapperswil
- Born: 1 July 1762; Andermatt
- Died: 19 February 1834 (aged 72); Rapperswil
- Education: art school of Johann Melchior Wyrsch
- Known for: portrait painting
- Movement: Classicism
- Spouse: Anna Elsa (Lisette) Franziska Diogg-Curti
- Children: Maria Franziska Diogg (1793-1855) and Felix Columban (1795-1842)
- Patrons: Columban Sozzi, abbot of Disentis; Felix Christoph Fuchs Cajetan

Felix Maria Diogg (1 July 1762 – 19 February 1834) was a Swiss painter. Born in Andermatt, as an adult he made Rapperswil his home. Diogg is considered the most important Swiss Classicism portraitist.

== Life and work ==
Born as the son of Katharina Deflorin from Tavetsch, and the carpenter, painter, gilder and farmer Johann Columban, Felix Maria Diogg grew up in Andermatt in the canton of Uri. The great fire of Andermatt in 1766 forced the family to move to Tschamut in the canton of Graubünden where the abbot of Disentis, Columban Sozzi, paid attention to the talent of the shepherd boy. In 1780 Sozzi enabled Diogg to travel to the painter Johann Melchior Wyrsch who ran an art school in Besançon. From 1785 to 1788 Diogg travelled to Firenze, Roma and Napoli in Italy. In 1788 he returned to Switzerland, but went again on the move one year later.

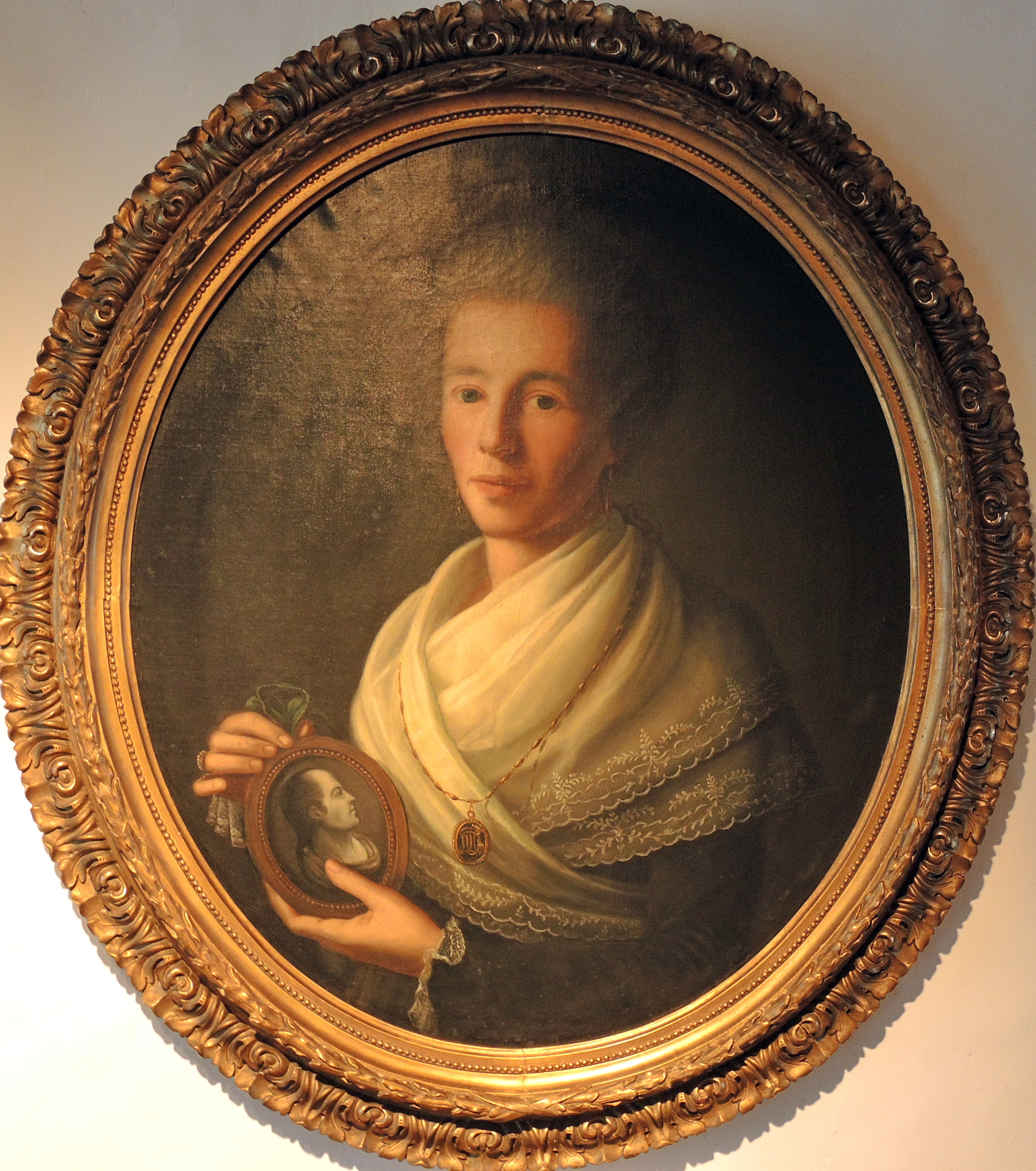
Anna Elsa Franziska Diogg-Curti, a portrait by her husband, oil on canvas around 1815, Stadtmuseum Rapperswil-Jona

Felix Christoph Fuchs Cajetan, painter and writer in residence of Rapperswil, prompted Diogg to come to Rapperswil where Diogg was introduced to the influential families. In 1790/91 Diogg painted a series of portraits of the Families Curti, Fuchs, Rickenmann and Helbling, and Diogg received more numerous portrait commissions. In 1791 he became a citizen of Rapperswil and married Anna Elsa Franziska (Lisette) Diogg-Curti, the daughter of guild master Karl Ludwig, in July 1792. The couple had four children: Maria Franziska Magdalena Elisabeth Bonaventura (1793–1855) was married to Jost Ribar Rüegg and died without descendants. Felix Columban Diogg (1795–1842) was named after his oncle and became a politician and an officer, and two other children, a boy and a girl, died after birth.

In Zürich Diogg portrayed the members of the industrialist family Esslinger in 1793. A year later, the now upstart Diogg published, influenced by the ideas of the French Revolution, an open letter in which he denounced the hypocrisy of the provincial aristocracy. In 1797 he met Goethe in Stäfa on Zürichsee lake shore where he painted "Freiheitstafel für die vom Zürcher Rat gemassregelten Patrioten", literally the Freedom panel for the patriots reprimanded by the Zürich Council in 1798. Even in his arrived years Diogg was traveling: he painted in Appenzell, St. Gallen and Herisau, from 1799 to 1809 in Bern and western Switzerland, later in Alsace and in Karlsruhe where he portrayed the Russian Empress Elizabeth Alexeyevna in 1814. In 1816 Diogg lived in Frankfurt am Main, but the Zürichsee region remained the center of his sphere. Among others, in 1819 Diogg painted portraits of the families Biedermann, Blum and Sulzer in Winterthur. Felix Maria Diogg died in Rapperswil in 1834.

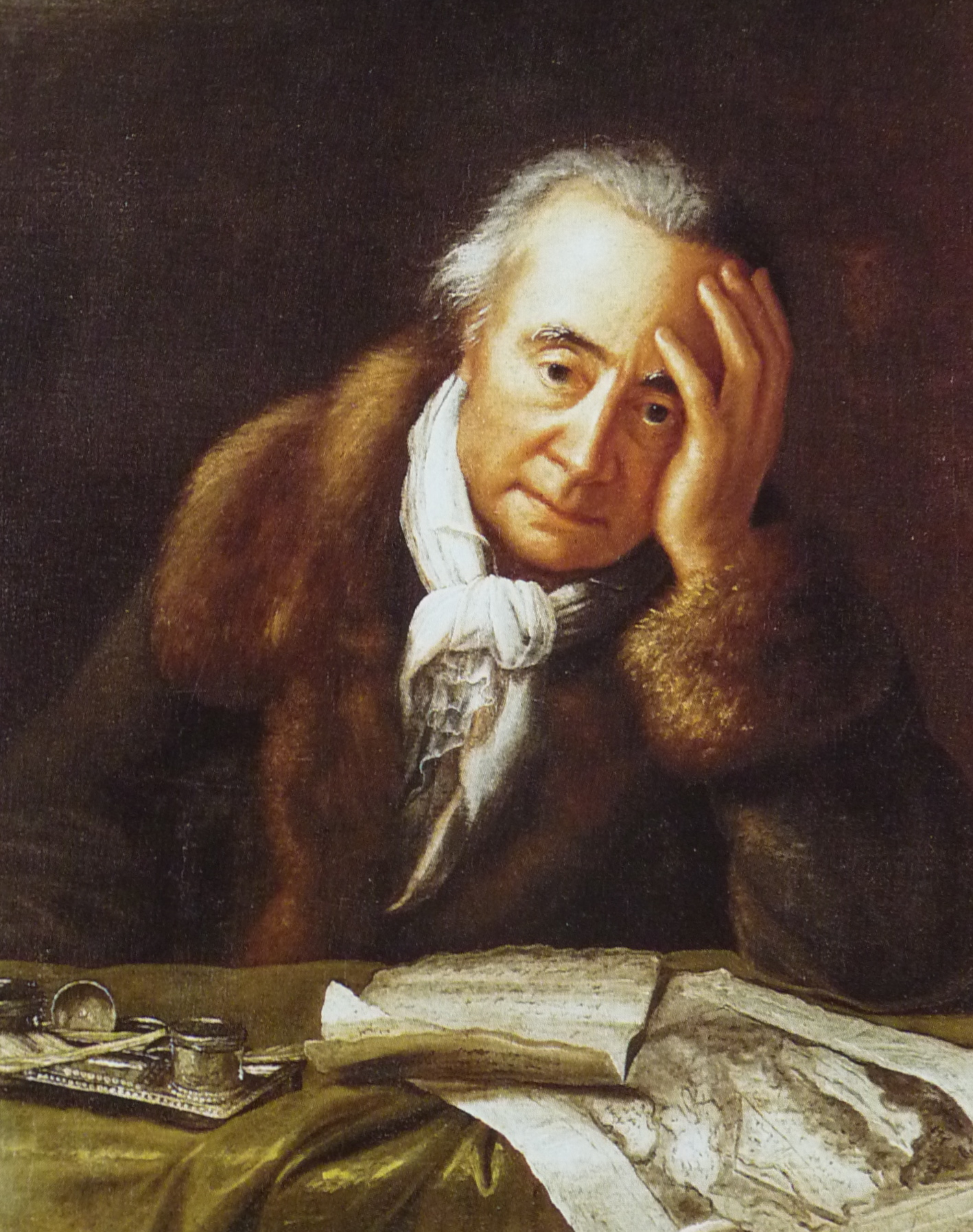
Ulysses von Salis-Marschlins

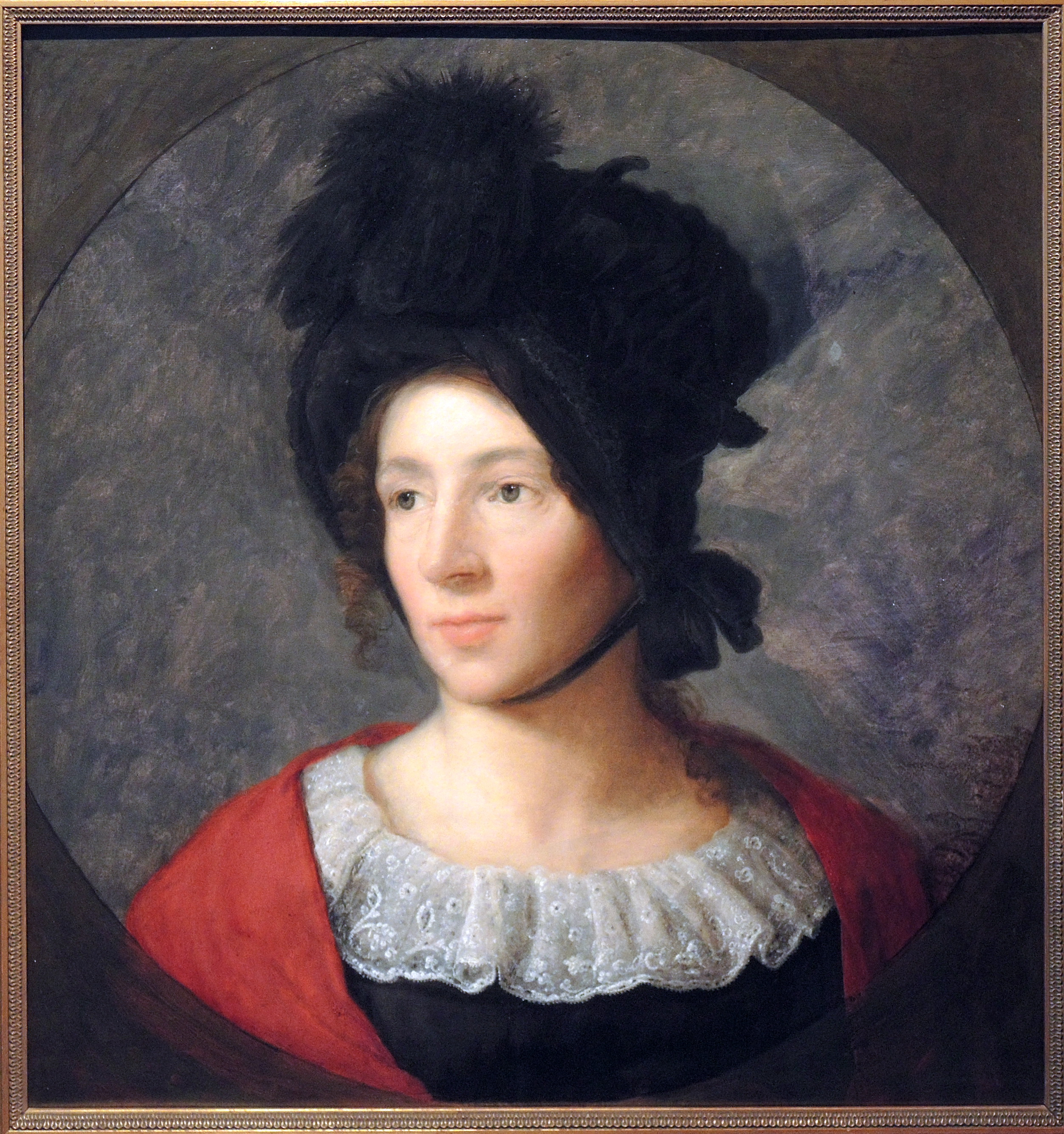
Maria Franziska Diogg (1793-1855), daughter, oil on canvas around 1814, Stadtmuseum Rapperswil-Jona

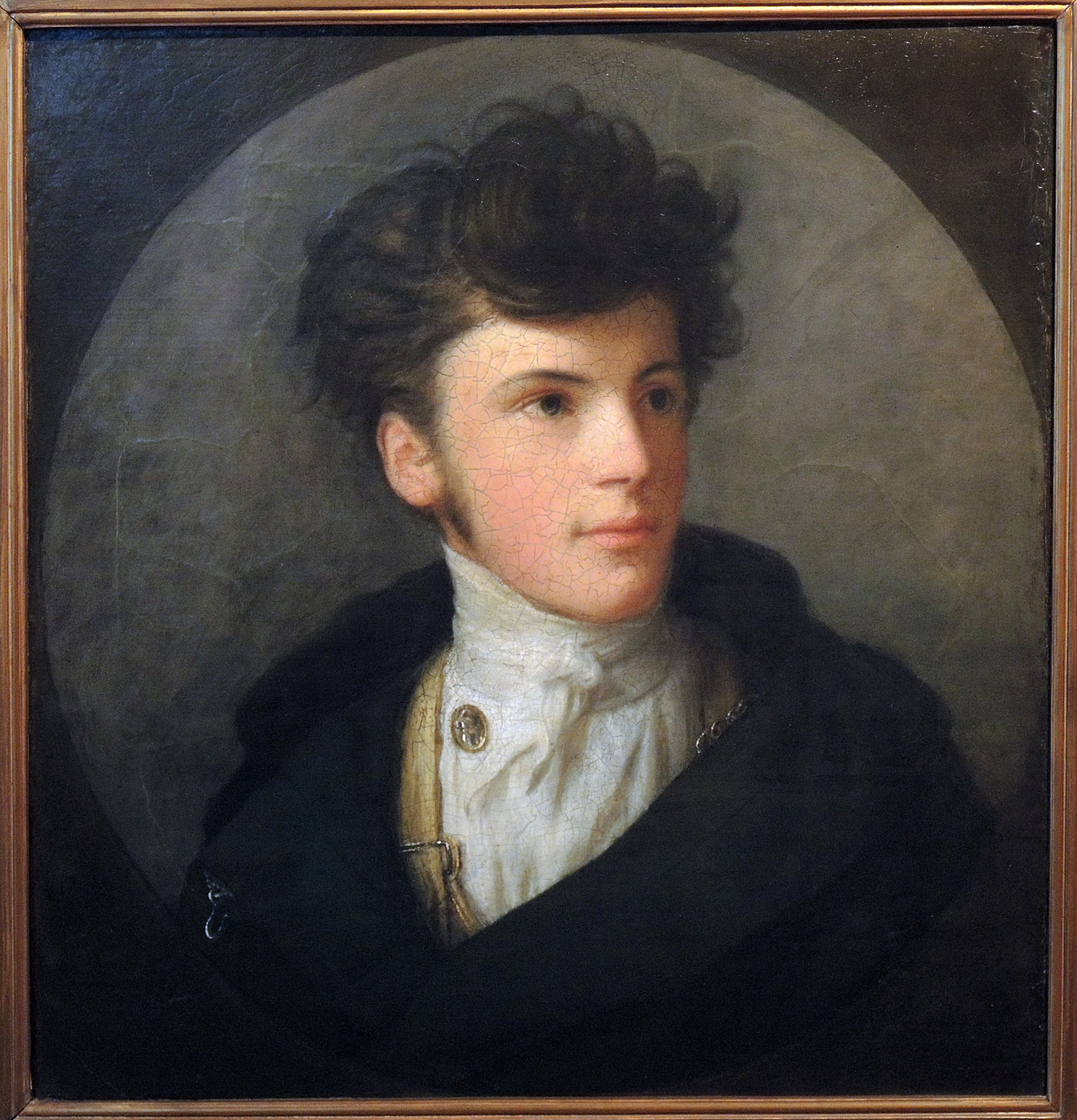
Felix Columban Diogg, son, oil on wood, around 1815

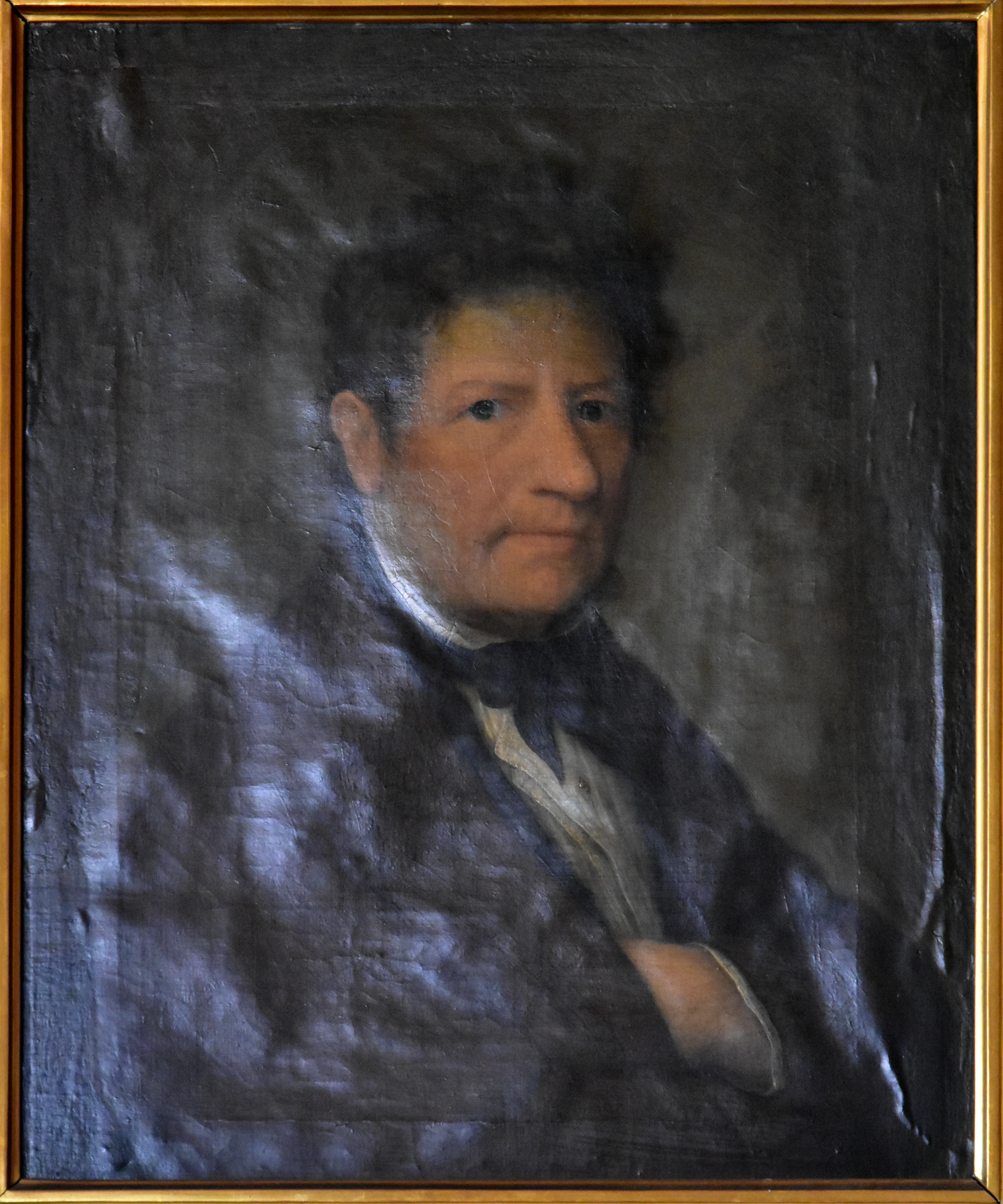
self-portrait, around 1825, Rathaus Rapperswil

== Reception ==
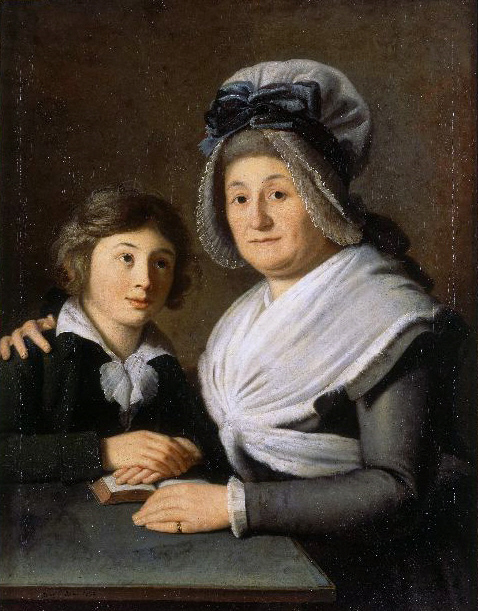
Regula Lavater-Usteri and her son Diethelm, 1792, Landesmuseum Zürich

A catalog raisonné by the artist's hand is not recorded. In the 50 years of his work Felix Maria Diogg painted probably more than 600 portraits. He participated in exhibitions in Berlin, Bern, St. Gallen and Zürich. Diogg's work is an example of the specialization within the era following the Baroque painting: he almost exclusively painted portraits, including a few group representations. The vast majority of his more than 300 surviving works consists of paintings; there are also some drawings, watercolors and etchings. This inventory provides a gallery of the Swiss "upper class" between the French Revolution and the beginning of Restoration, beyond the aristocracy out to the upper-middle-class people. Among them known personalities of the spiritual life, such as Johann Kaspar Lavater (1794, Kunsthaus Zürich, two other versions are known), the historian Johannes von Müller (1797, Schloss Jegenstorf) and the educator Johann Heinrich Pestalozzi (1801, Zürich, Pestalozzianum). The most famous model was the Russian Empress Elisabeth of Baden (1814, Karlsruhe, Badisches Landesmuseum). Diogg dissolved very soon from his beginnings, for example the moving portrait of Franz Josef Nager (1784, Altdorf, Historisches Museum) or the playful child portrait of Anton Müller (1785). His Classicism style ranges between distant stylization and committed realism. Representatives from different walks of life interested Diogg primarily as individuals; the state indicating attributes and anecdotal elements recede.

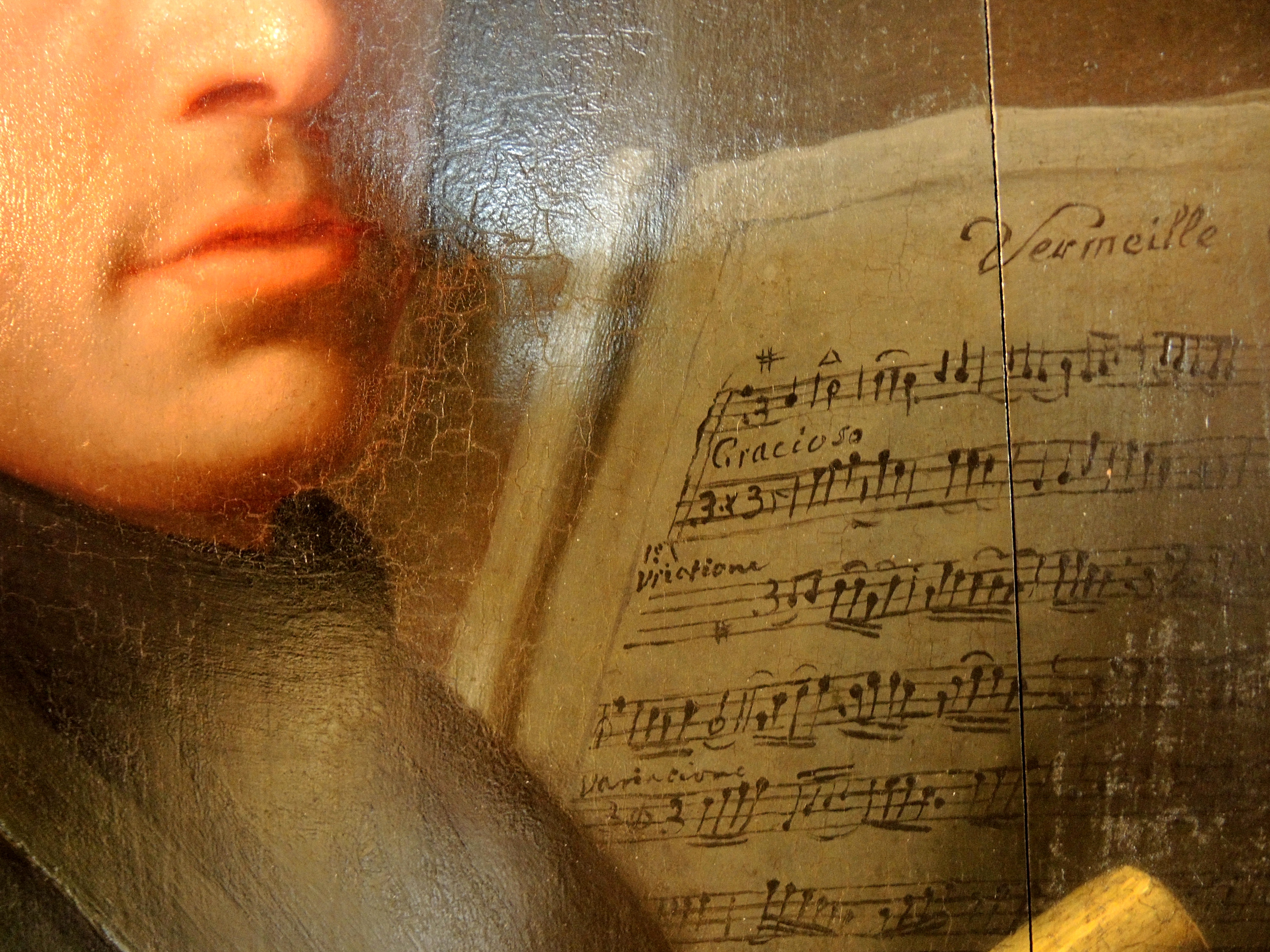
Karl Dominik Greith, oil on wood around 1800, detail, Stadtmuseum Rapperswil-Jona

Diogg's way of working is characterized by three-quarter views against a neutral, dark background; Diogg sought a natural effect. The art historian Walter Hugelshofer emphasizes the stately formats of images as well as the Diogg's sense for a picturesque overall idea, and a warm color scale. Diogg seems to have mapped directly onto the canvas without preparatory studies. The sitter have seen large-frame effect. The clothing according to the contemporary fashion most was simple; the most noticeable additions are the hats. The main interest of the painter was the face. The eyes are becoming more understood as the actual lifeblood. This can be recognized by the high intensity around the gaze of Johannes Müller's portrait or of Diogg's self-portrait (Rathaus Rapperswil) from the period around 1825. In the draft of these paintings Diogg shows a contemporary of the great Goya. Diogg is considered as the most important Swiss Classicism portraitist.

== Literature (selected works) ==
- Ludivic Hendry: Il portretist da Tschamut / Dessegns da Jacques Guidon. In: Ovra svizra per lectura alla giuventetgna 1208. Ligia romontscha, Zürich 1972.
- Walter Hugelshofer: Felix Maria Diogg, ein schweizerischer Bildnismaler, 1762-1834. Max Niehans, Zürich and Leipzig 1941.
- Kunstmuseum Luzern (publisher): Katalog der Ausstellung Felix Maria Diogg, 1762-1834 [im] Kunstmuseum Luzern, 11. November bis 9. Dezember 1934: Gemälde, Zeichnungen, Radierungen. C. J. Bucher A.G., Luzern 1934.
- Hans Kaspar Hirzel: Hirzel über (Felix Maria) Diogg den Mahler, einen Zögling der Natur: Den Manen des... Kammerherrn von Schuhmacher gewidmet. Ziegler, Zürich and Leipzig, 1792.
