= Alwina Gossauer =

Swiss photographer (1841–1926)

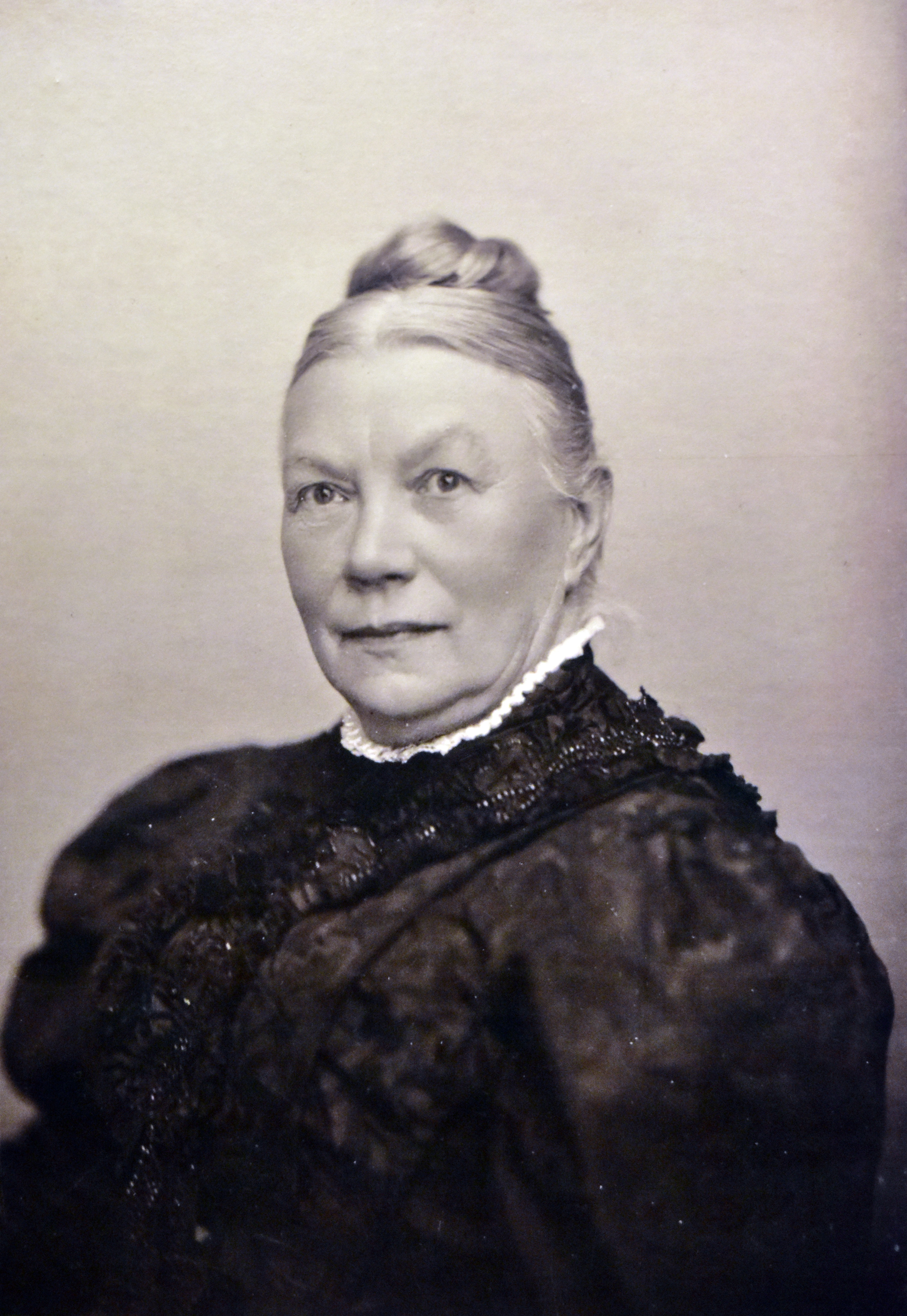
- Self-portrait around 1900
- Born: 1841; Rapperswil
- Died: 1 January 1926 (aged 85); Rapperswil
- Known for: professional photographer since 1865

Alwina Gossauer (1841–1926) was a Swiss photographer and businesswoman. Born and raised in Rapperswil, as an adult she made Rapperswil again her home and became one of the first women professional photographers in Switzerland.

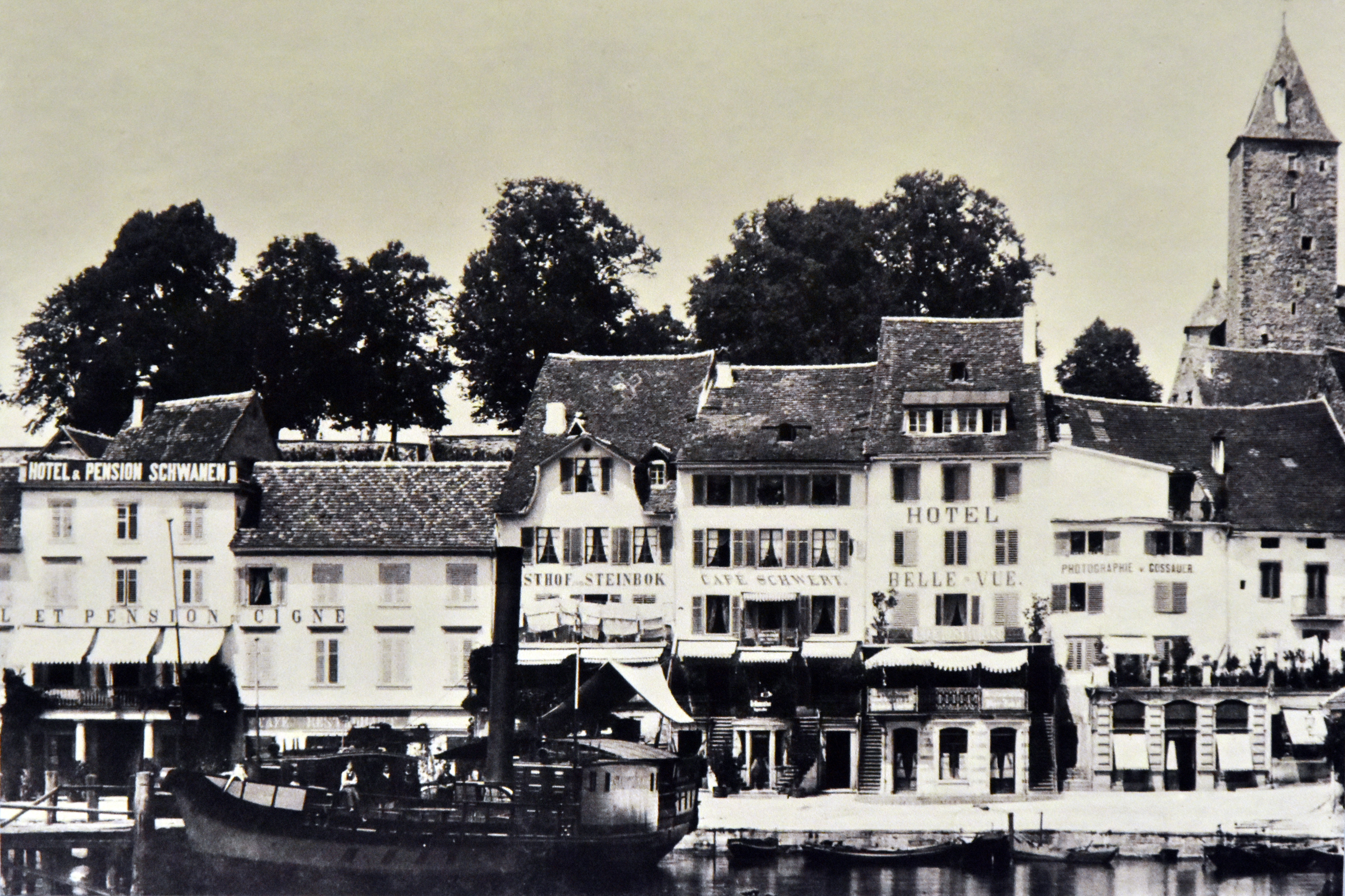
Gossauer's first own photo atelier "Photographie A. Gossauer", photographed by herself around 1880. The photograph shows the present Seequai in Rapperswil, where at that time the Zürichsee-Schifffahrtsgesellschaft (ZSG) landing gate was situated, Lindenhof hill and the Rapperswil Castle's Gügeli tower in the background.

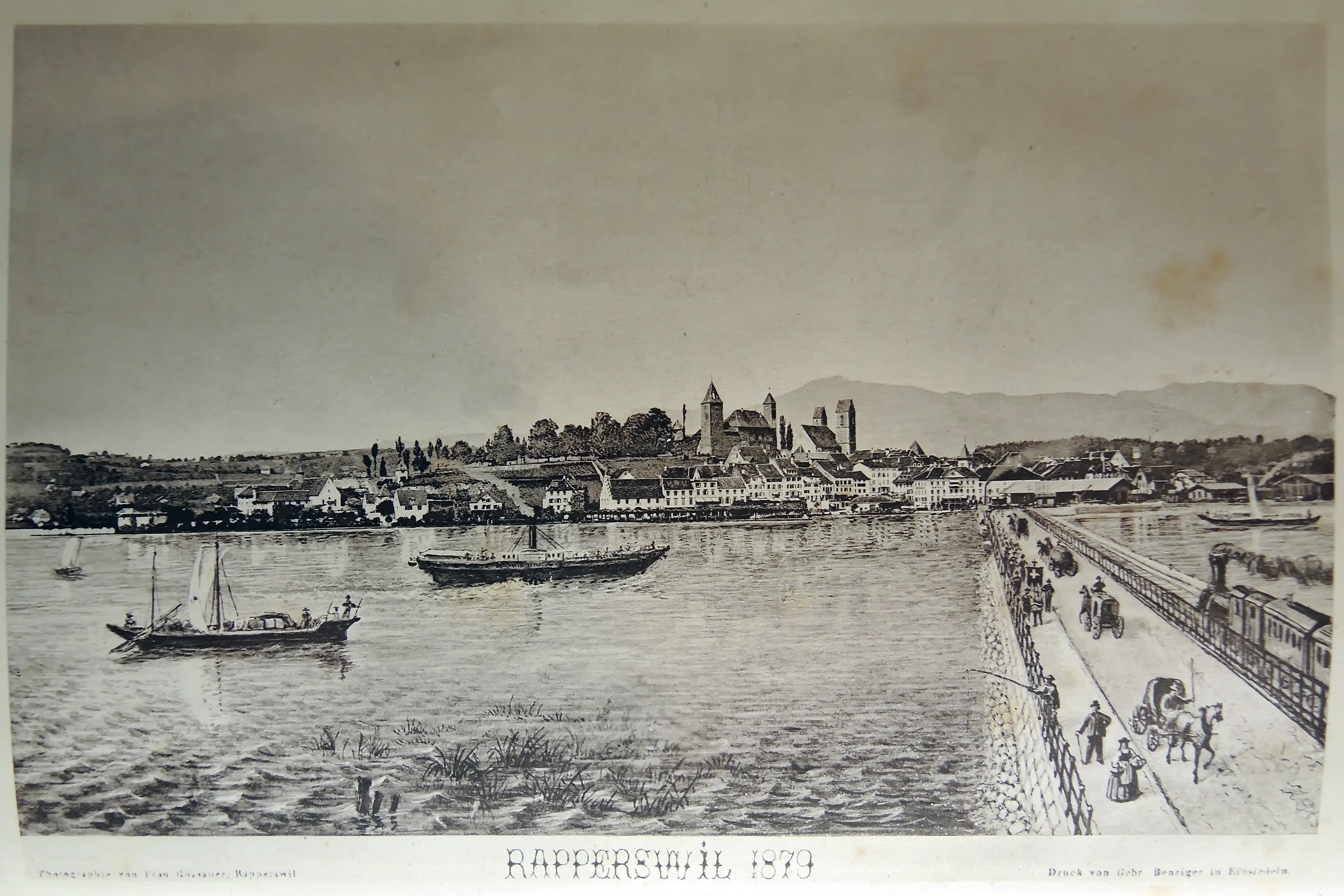
1878 photograph by Gossauer showing the Seedamm railway causeway, a panoramic view of Rapperswil and of the Bachtel mountain. The retouched photograph was published on occasion of the opening ceremony of the Seedamm railway causeway.

== Early life and marriage ==
Alwina Gossauer was born in Rapperswil, where her parents operated a business and where she spent her childhood. At the age of 18, Gossauer married Johann Kölla, who worked as a saddler. They lived in Zürich, and in 1864 her husband learned to make photographs. In the attic of their house at Napfgasse near Neumarkt, Zürich, they set up one of the first photography studios in Zürich. In the same year, Kölla was sentenced to a fine of one month in prison because he had photographed nude dames. Shortly after, the family moved to Rapperswil, where Kölla bought an inn at the Rapperswil railway station, and again, set up a studio. Alwina learned photography by working in the atelier, and started photographing in 1865. In 1868 Kölla committed an offense of making counterfeit bank bills and was sentenced to eighteen months in prison and 10 years banishment from the Canton of St. Gallen. From the bankruptcy of her husband, Alwina saved a portion of household effects and the valuable photographic equipment.

== Photographer and businesswomen ==
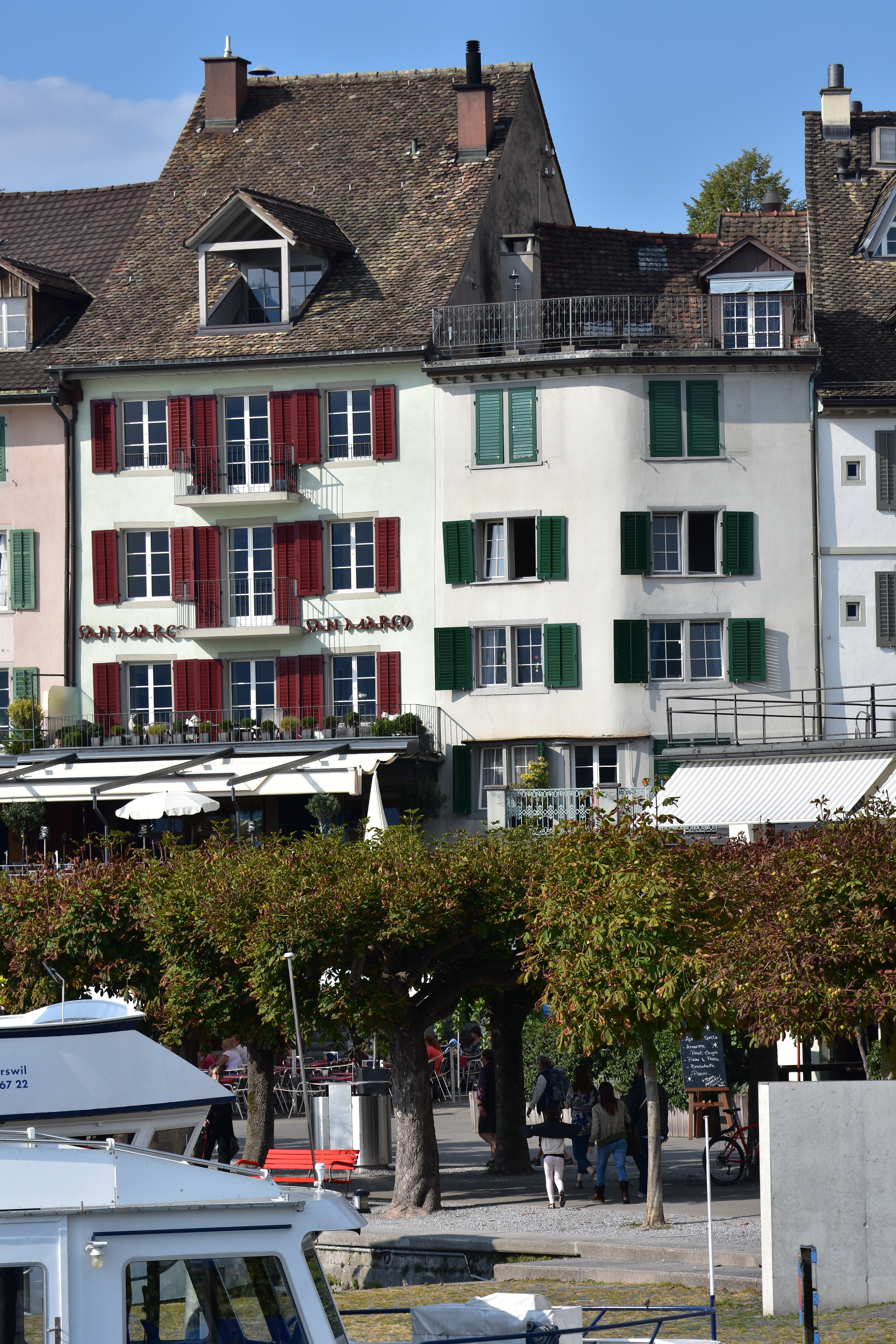
Kunstgüetli house in Rapperswil (September 2015)

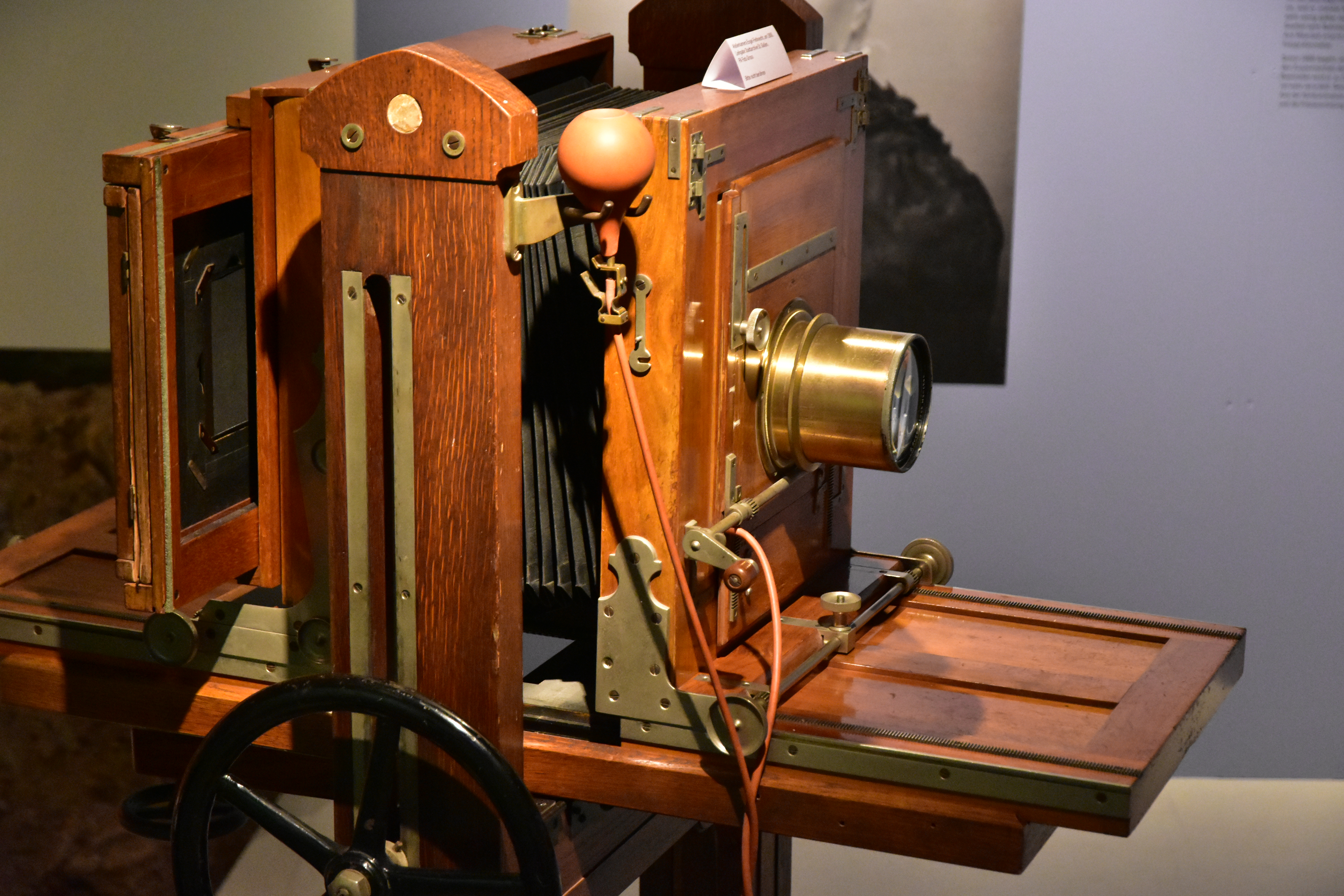
A folding camera type Engel-Feitknecht as used by Gossauer around 1890.

Under the name Alwina Kölla-Gossauer she published a newspaper advertisement in June 1868 which announced the continuation of the joint business. She rented the house Kunstgüetli on Seequai, at the pier of the present Zürichsee-Schifffahrtsgesellschaft (ZSG) probably to benefit from the excursion traffic and increasing tourism. There, she set up the photography studio "Photographie A. Gossauer", using her unmarried name The family lived on the first floor, and on the ground floor the customers were served. From this point, Alwina led the business successfully as a freelance photographer and businesswoman, initially under the name of her husband, Kölla, later under her unmarried name Gossauer. Her field of activity were classic portrait photography, landscape photography and commissioned works for books, newspapers and magazines.

After serving his prison sentence, her husband tried again as a photographer, on the other side of the Seedamm between the upper and Zürichsee, he established a studio on Richterswil lake shore in the Canton of Zürich, to comply with the condition of the ten-year deportation from the Canton of St. Gallen. His wife loaned him photographic equipment, and also due the local separation, their relationship deteriorated rapidly. In 1871 Alwina Gossauer filed for divorce against the will of her husband; the court decided in her favour. Their five children – aged between one and eleven – were attributed to her, and Alwina reverted to her maiden name Gossauer and added, as it was customary, the words divorced Koella (German: geschiedene Koella). Kölla did not pay alimony, sold his studio in Richterswil and the photographic equipment loaned from his wife, and in vain Alwina sued her ex-husband in the civil courts. Meanwhile, Kölla made himself scarce, as noted in the court records, and migrated finally to America around 1868.

== Late years ==
In the 1870s, the divorce was expensive and forfeited Gossauer's independence: as it was customary at that times, a legal guardian was assigned, and every contract had to be confirmed by the custodian. Nevertheless, in his annual reports the custodian also mentioned Gossauer's business acumen, her eagerness, that she was able to earn money and to find her own living without having to take any financial help. Around the 1890s and 1900s, Gossauer used a folding camera type Engel-Feitknecht for reportages and landscape photography. Alfred Engel Feitknecht was the designer of the camera made in Switzerland; between 1878 and 1894 about 6000 cameras were produced.

In 1892 Gossauer was able to fulfil a long-cherished wish, thanks to her successful work as a photographer and businesswoman: at the Obere Bahnhofstrasse lane she bought land and built a three-storey commercial and residential building. On the top floor, she established a modern photography studio with a glass roof, and a large sign in capital letters wore the name of her business: "Photographie A. Gossauer".

== Death and aftermath ==
Jean Kölla, Gossauer's son, learned his mother's photographic craft, just as her daughter Alwina (1862–1946), who remained unmarried, ran the business under the name of her mother until the 1920s. Her son Albert did not train as a photographer, but later worked together with his brother Jean. The youngest daughter Caroline married the photographer Karl Stalder; in 1920 they ran her mother's business in Rapperswil under the name K. Stalder-Kölla until the 1940s. "Alwina Gossauer was a fighter," the pastor said in 1926 at her grave.

== Exhibitions ==
- 2015 Stadtmuseum Rapperswil-Jona: Der Zeit voraus – Drei Frauen auf eigenen Wegen: Marianne Ehrmann-Brentano Schriftstellerin und Journalistin (1755–1795); Alwina Gossauer Fotografin und Geschäftsfrau (1841–1926); Martha Burkhardt Globetrotterin und Malerin (1874–1956).
