= Ufenau =

Island in Switzerland

Ufenau island
Native name: Ufnau Nickname: Insel der Stille
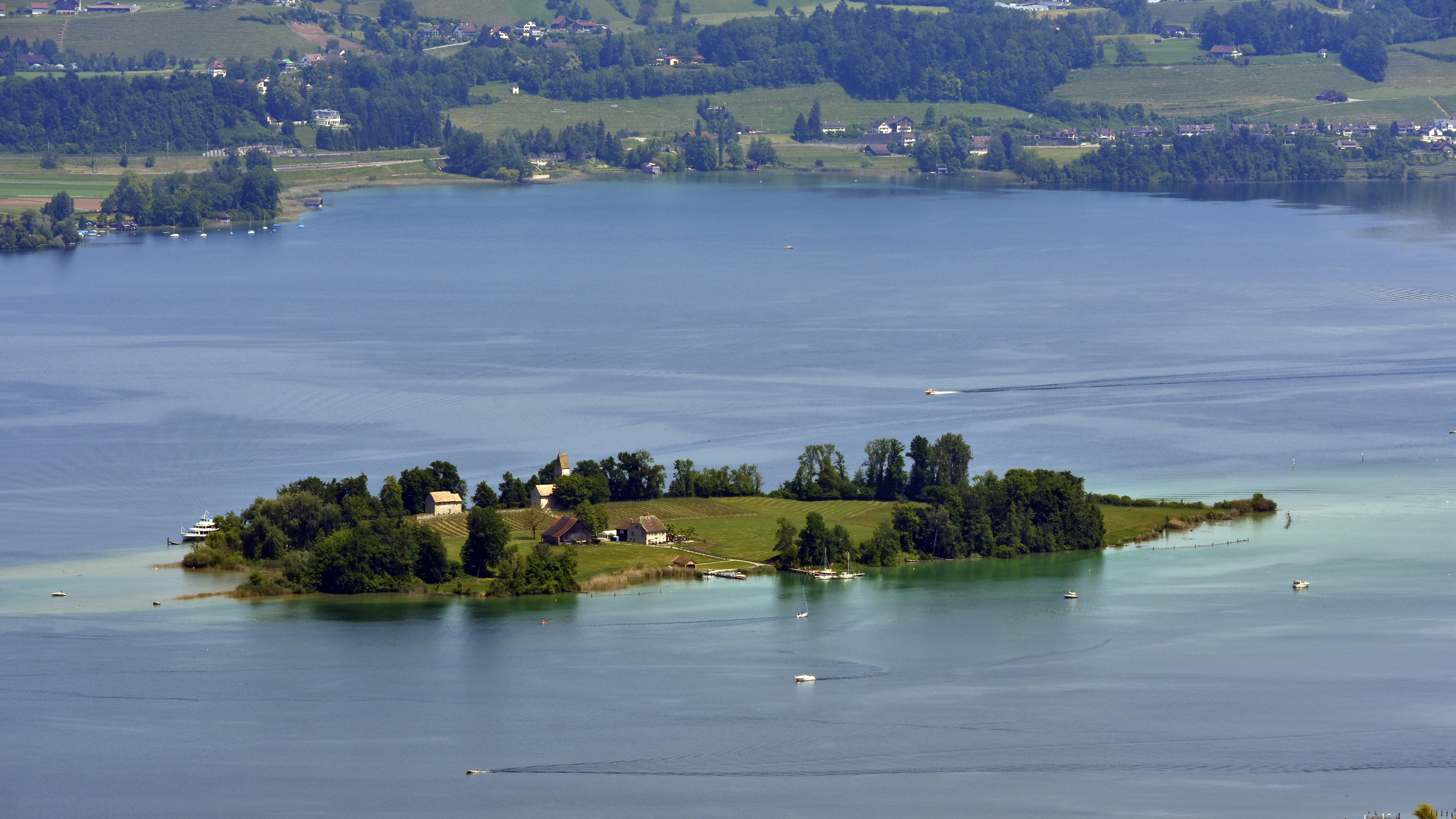
- Aerial view

- Location within Switzerland Location within Canton of Schwyz

Geography
- Location: Lake Zürich
- Coordinates: 47°13′05″N 8°46′54″E
- Highest elevation: 423 m (1388 ft)
- Highest point: Unnamed

Administration
- Switzerland
- Canton: Schwyz
- District: Höfe

Ufenau (German pronunciation: [ˈuːfənaʊ]) is an island located, with the neighbouring island of Lützelau, in Lake Zurich in Switzerland between Freienbach (0.9 km (0.56 mi) away) and Rapperswil (2.5 km (1.6 mi) away). Highlights on Ufenau include St. Peter & Paul church, St. Martin's chapel, and Ufenau's idyllic landscape in the Frauenwinkel protected area.

== Geography ==
Ufenau lies in Höfe district in the canton of Schwyz. The island measures 112,645 m^{2} (1,212,500 sq ft) in all, 470 m (1,540 ft) from east to west and 220 m (720 ft) from north to south. The highest point of the island is 423 m (1,388 ft) above sea level or 17 m (56 ft) above lake level on 406 m (1,332 ft). Swimming, camping and other leisure activities are forbidden, as it is a protected area.

On occasion of the formation of the Alps, the fossilized sediments material of the body of water between the Ricken and Etzel chains unfolded. There arose the typical rock bands that form the Lindenhof hill in Rapperswil, or the islands of Ufnau, Lützelau and Heilighüsli. During the last Ice Age the island was under a thick layer of ice. Ufnau consists of two parallel rock ridges: the hard layers of conglomerate rock in the south and the northern sandstone ridge survived the sanding by the glacier.

== Transport ==
The first steamship stopped at the northern shore in 1857. 15 years later a landing gate was built in the south, and in 1881 the present ship gate for touristic use was established in the north; the southern ship gate gave location to a small harbour that is used for private-owned motorboats and sailing yachts.

Tourist boat trips, run by the Zürichsee-Schifffahrtsgesellschaft (ZSG), sail between Zürich-Bürkliplatz and Rapperswil.

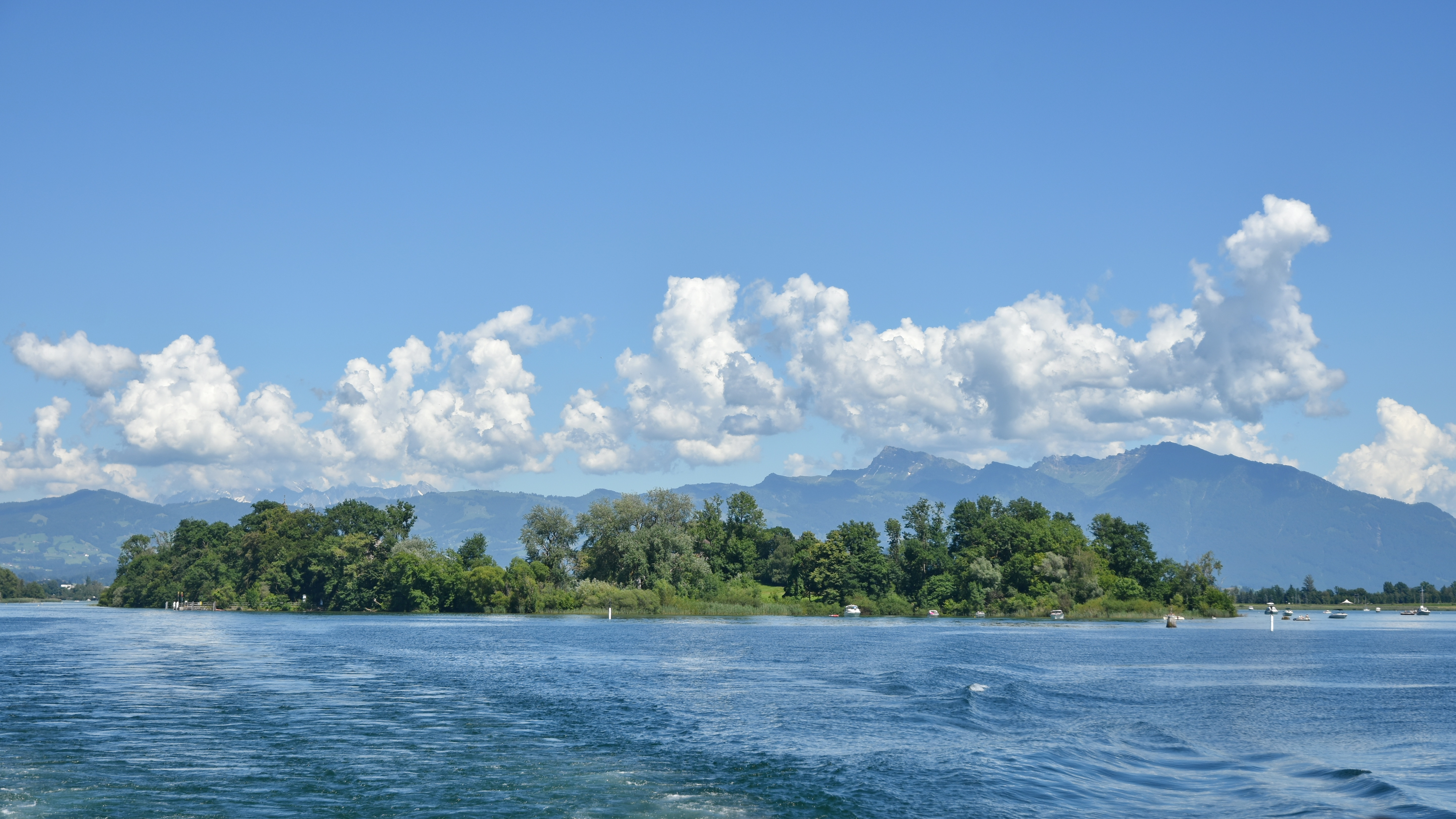
westerly view of Ufenau island as seen from ZSG ship MS Helvetia

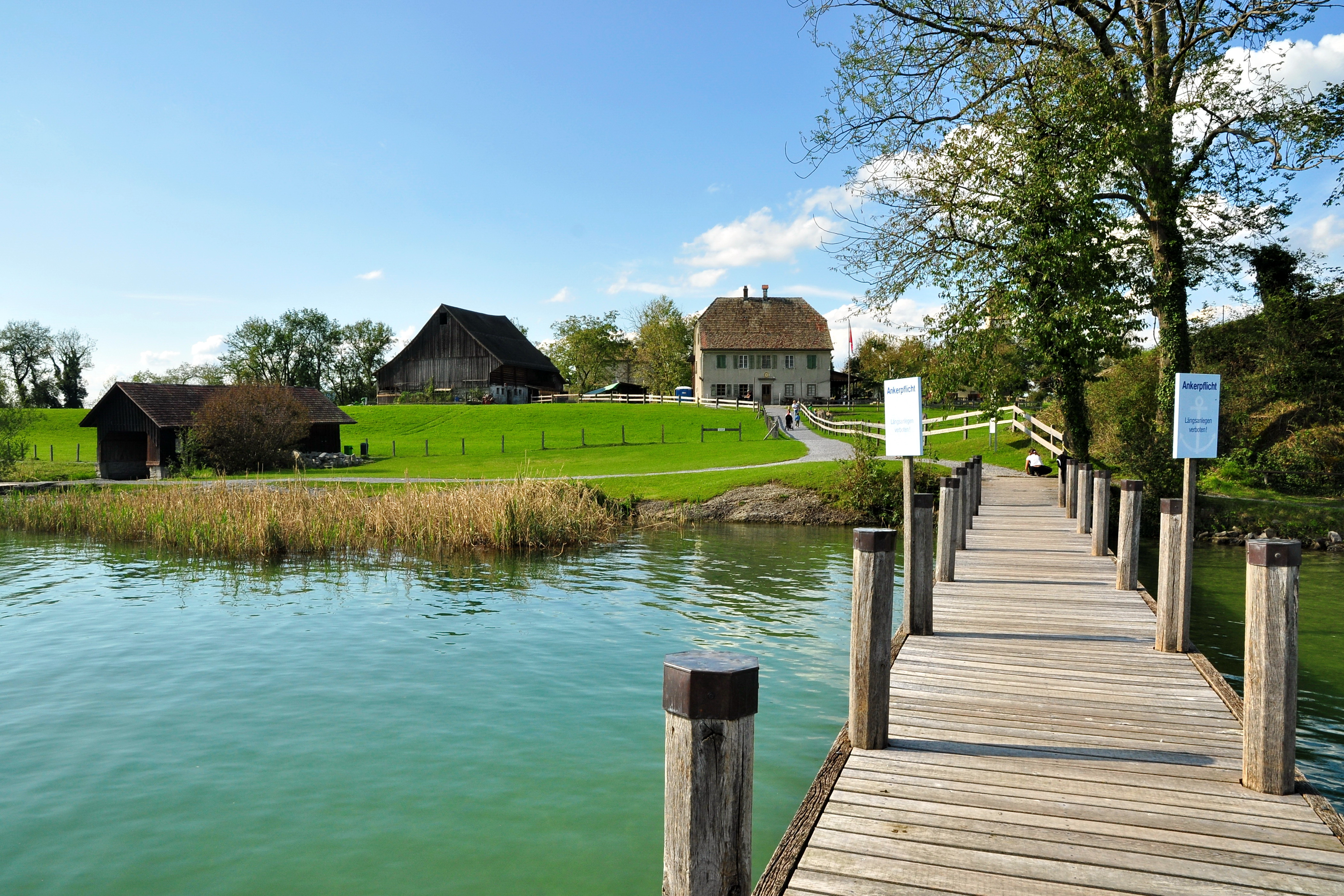
Ufenau as seen from the southern privately used jetty

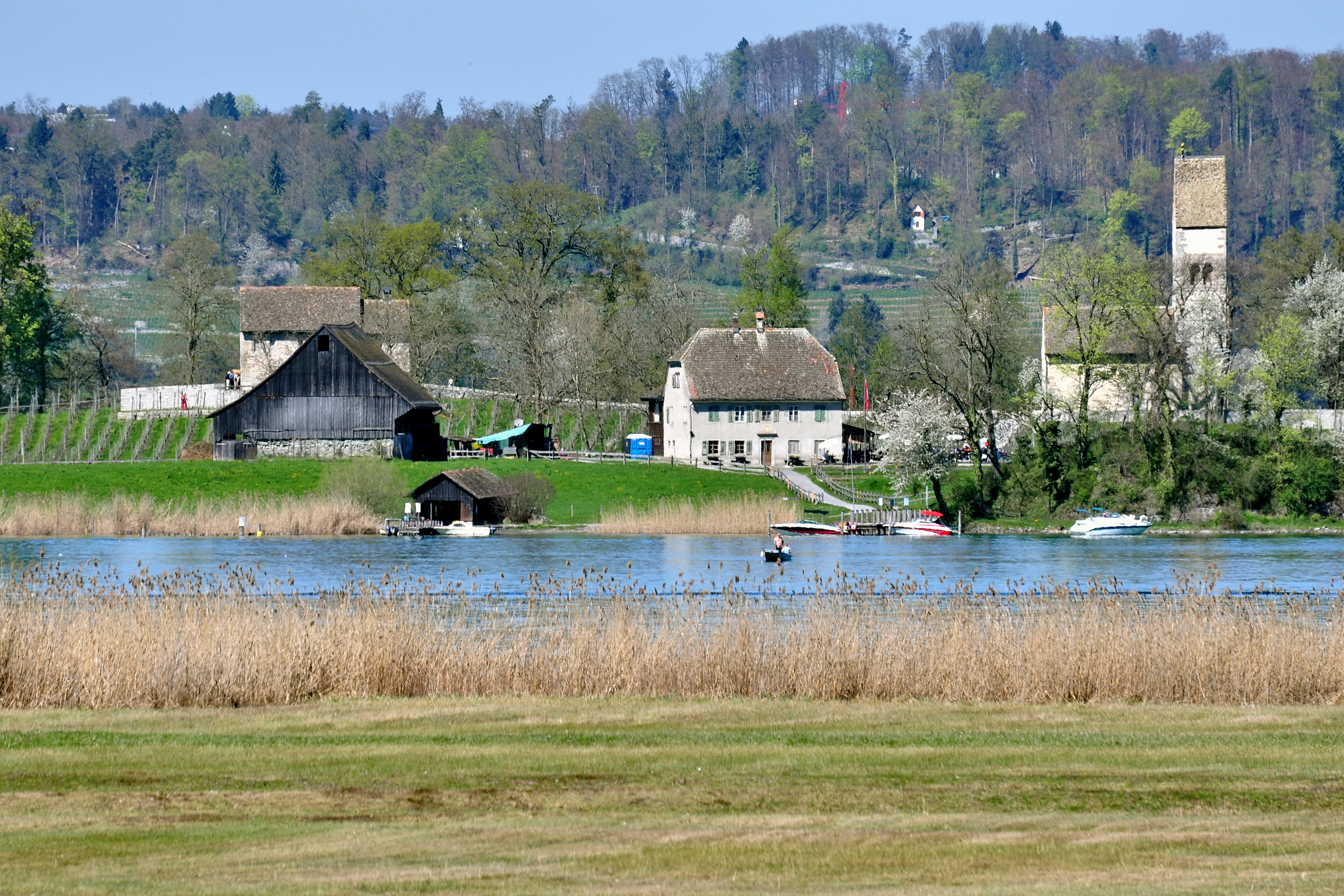
Ufenau as seen from the Frauenwinkel protected area

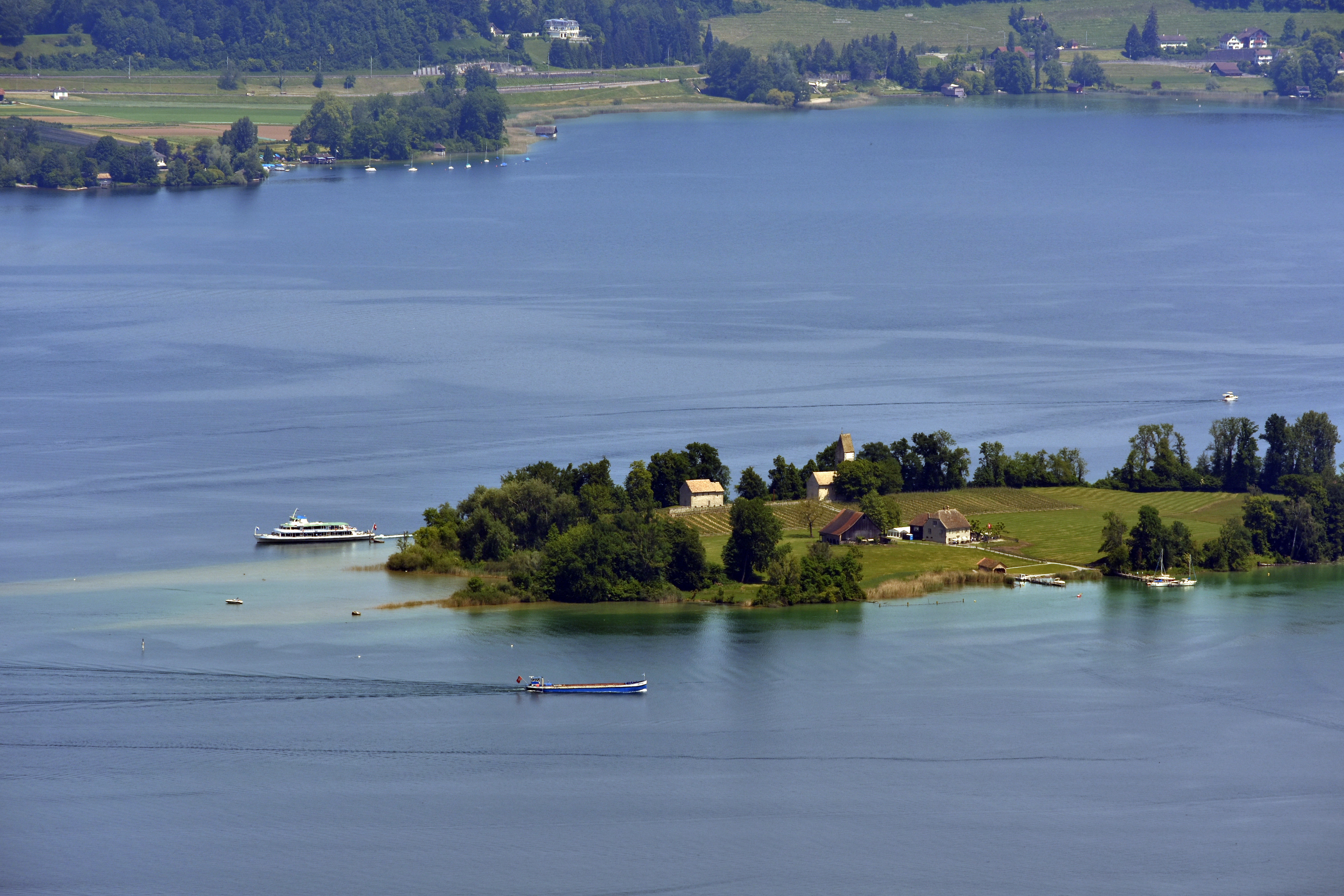
Ufenau as seen from Feusisberg towards Etzel Kulm

== History ==
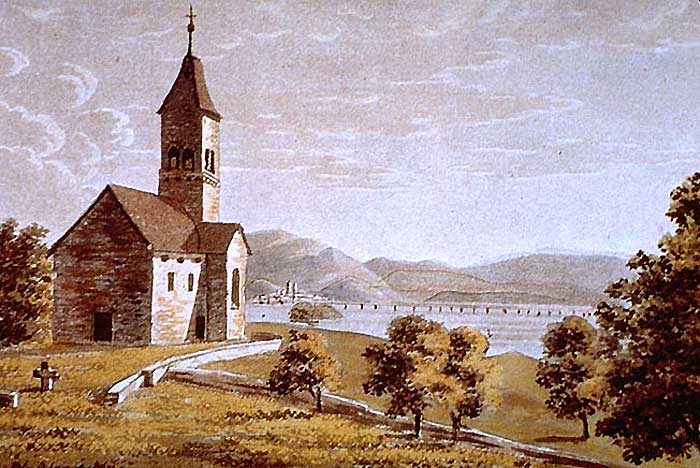
Ufenau and upper Lake Zurich, Lützelau, Rapperswil and its wooden bridge to Hurden in the background (1829)

In 1st and 2nd century, the remains of a Roman temple are dated, broken during Alamannic occupation of the Swiss Plateau. In 5th or 6th century, a first Christian church was built on this probably pre-Roman sacred area. Ufenau is first mentioned in 741 as «Hupinauia», and in 744 as «Ubinauvia» – island of Huppan or Huphan. Probably between 900 and 920, the early Christian church was destroyed by the Huns. On 23 January 965, the island was given by Emperor Otto I to Einsiedeln Abbey, that still is its owner. In 926 or some years later, St. Peter & Paul church' preceding building was given by the Hunfridings noblewoman Reginlinda and Burchard II, Duke of Swabia, in addition with a house for herself and her son Adalrich. Reginlinda died in 958 and is buried in Einsiedeln. In 973 later Saint Adalrich (Canonization in 1659) died on Ufenau.

Historians mention a 10th-century ferry station assumably at the so-called Einsiedlerhaus in Rapperswil – in 981 AD as well as the vineyard on the Lindenhof hill – between Kempraten on lake shore, Lützelau and Ufenau island and assumably present Hurden, which allowed the pilgrims towards Einsiedeln to cross the lake before the prehistoric bridge at the Seedamm isthmus was re-built in 1358. In 1798 the Helvetic Republic secularized the Einsiedeln Abbey's property, and Ufenau was given to the non-durable Canton of Linth. In 1805 Ufenau was given by the merchant Family Curti from Rapperswil to the Einsiedeln Abbey.

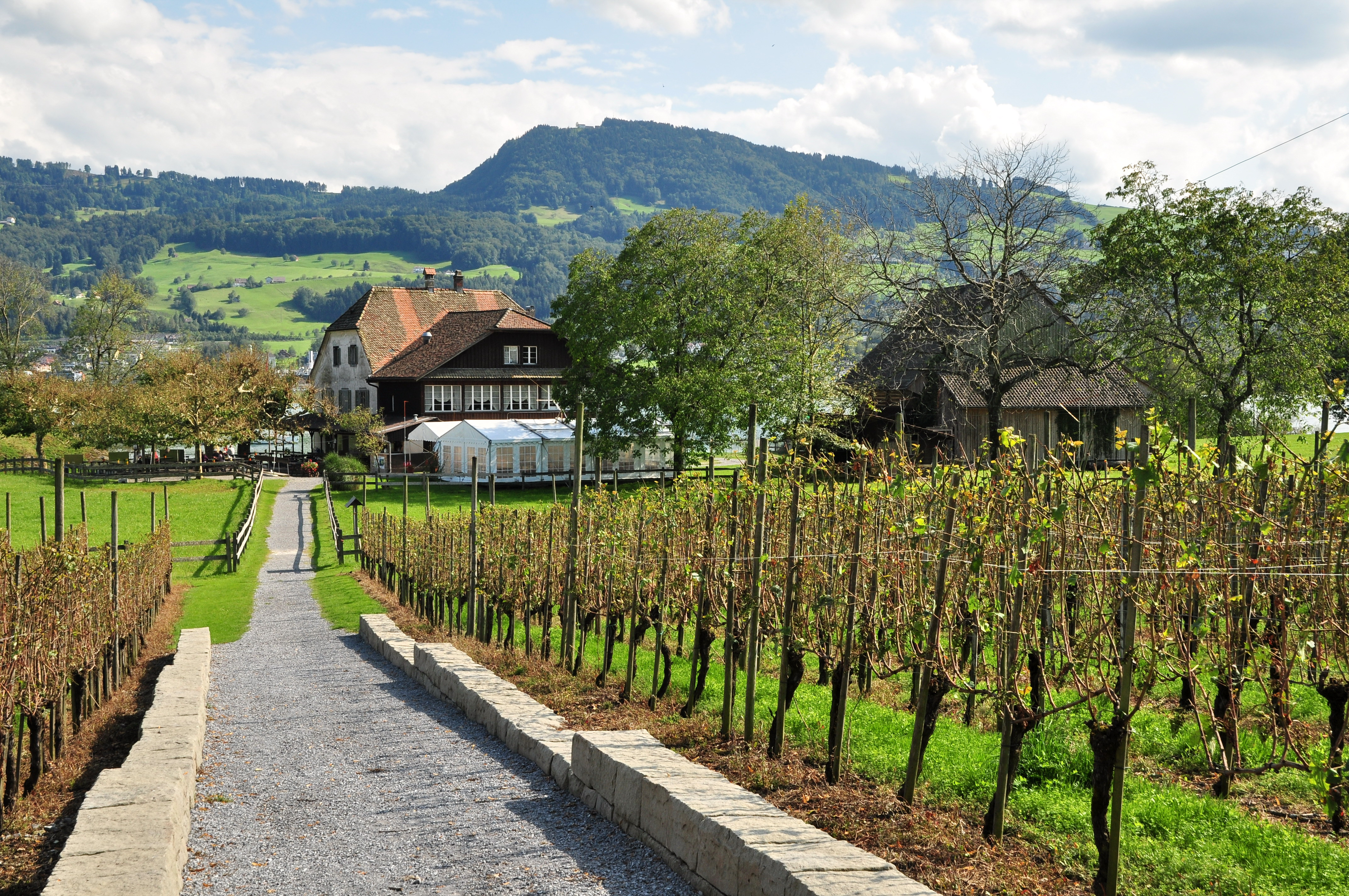
Vineyards and restaurant as seen from the north

5800 Vitis vinifera Blauburgunder (Pinot noir) were planted in 1986. The Einsiedeln Abbey owns 1 hectare (2.5 acres) of the Ufenau vineyards which are cultivated by its winery.

On 7 December 2003 the Ufenau association was founded, one year later «Freunde der Insel Ufnau». Friends of Ufenau island is a booster club to finance some projects for maintenance of the buildings located on the island, including both churches, and for the restaurant's renewal. It supports a long-time idea called «Insel der Stille» (island of silence), including a path way for disabled people around the island (completed in 2007), and regeneration of the island's shore areas to prevent increased erosion.

== St. Peter & Paul church and St. Martin's chapel ==
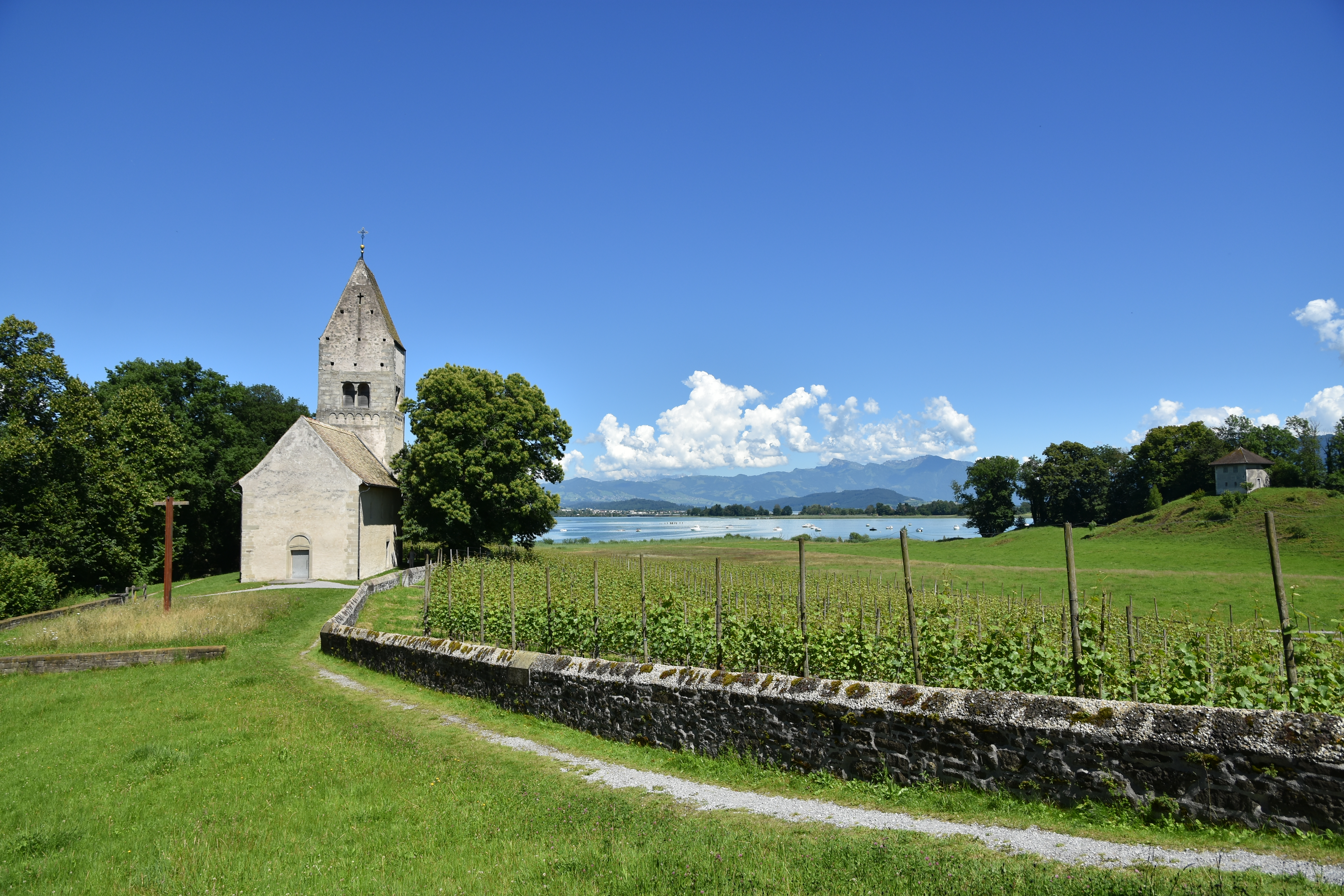
St. Peter and Paul church

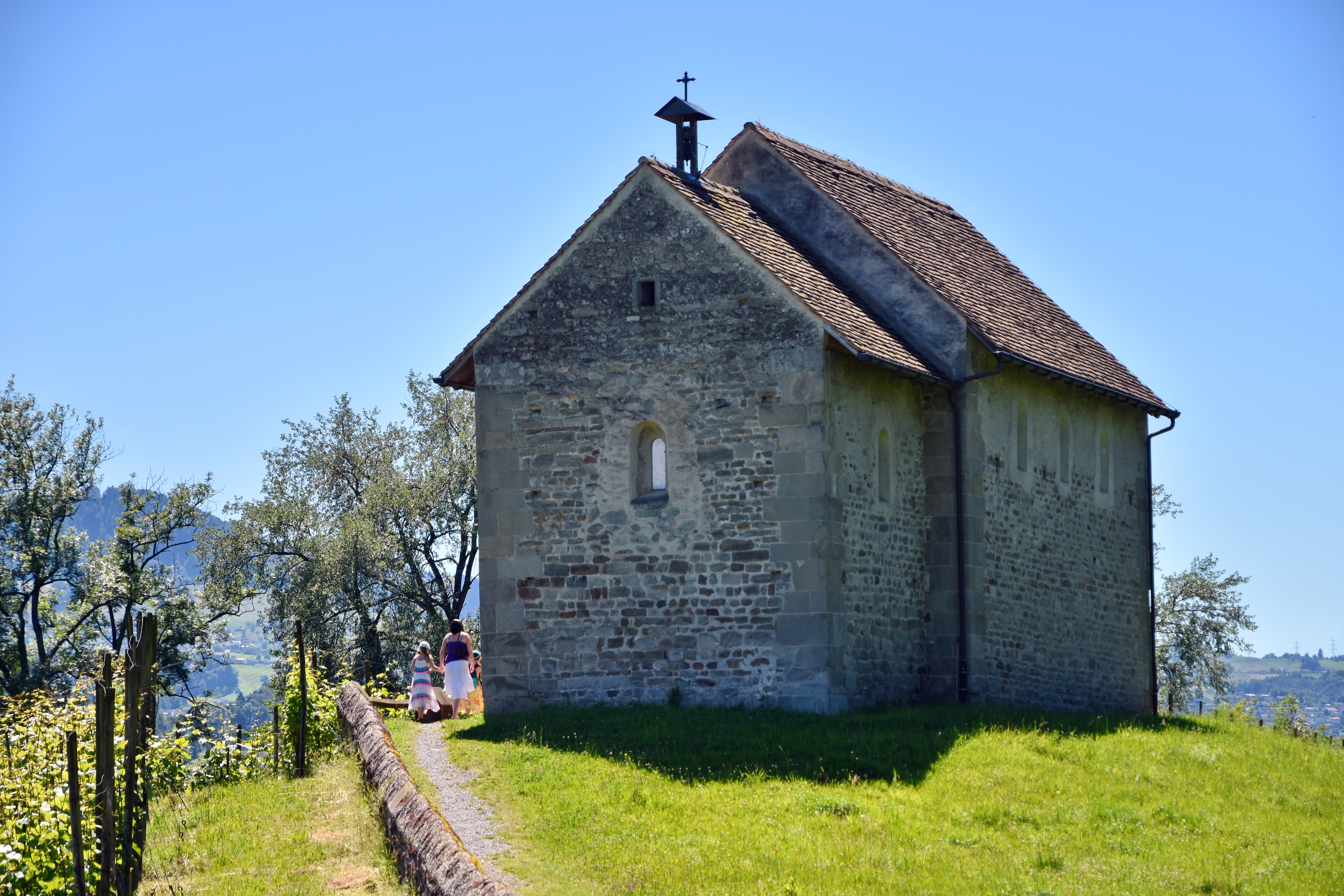
St. Martin's chapel

The present St. Peter & Paul church was built in 1141/42 (first mentioned in 970) and renewed in 1958/59. For hundreds of years, it was the parish church for the people living in the surrounding villages of Lake Zürich's upper shores. In 1522 Hans Klarer «Schnegg», a close friend of Ulrich Zwingli, served as pastor on Ufenau. One year later, Klarer convinced Zwingli, to refuge Ulrich von Hutten on Ufenau, where he died in seclusion. In 1968, his remains were identified, and buried in 1970 under a tombstone besides St. Peter & Paul church. Hutten's two years in exile on the island are immortalized by Conrad Ferdinand Meyer in Huttens letzte Tage (Hutten's last days).

St. Martin's chapel, few meters away, is dated in the 7th century. It was renewed in 1933/34 and in 1964/65. St. Martin's was built on the remains of a former Gallo-Roman temple dating back to the 2nd century. Until the early 14th century, both churches were also important cultural and intellectual centres for the communities dotted around Lake Zurich. A small wooden bridge to Hurden is mentioned until 1430, so-called «Kilchweg in die Uffnow» meaning pathway to the Ufenau church.

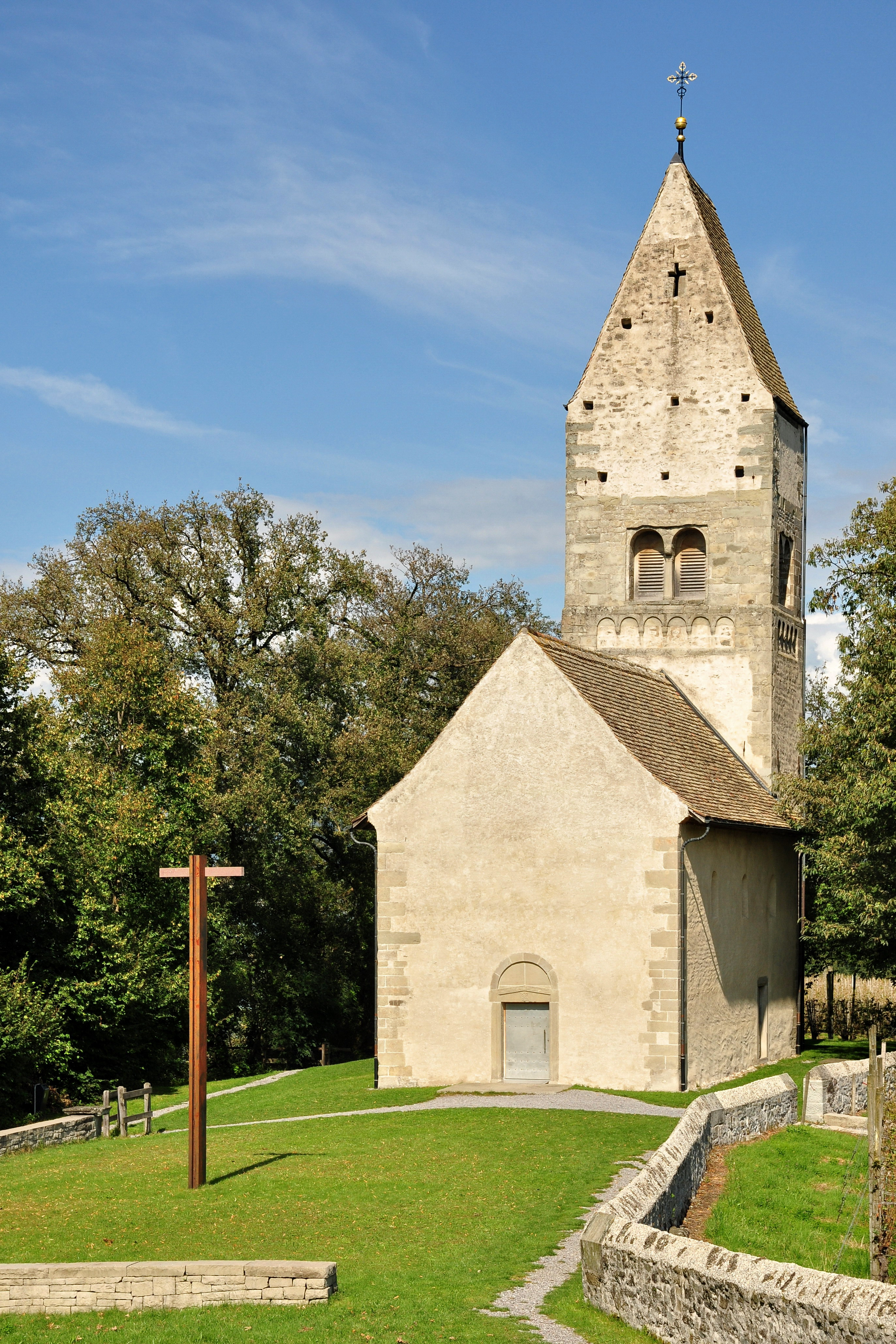
St. Peter and Paul church

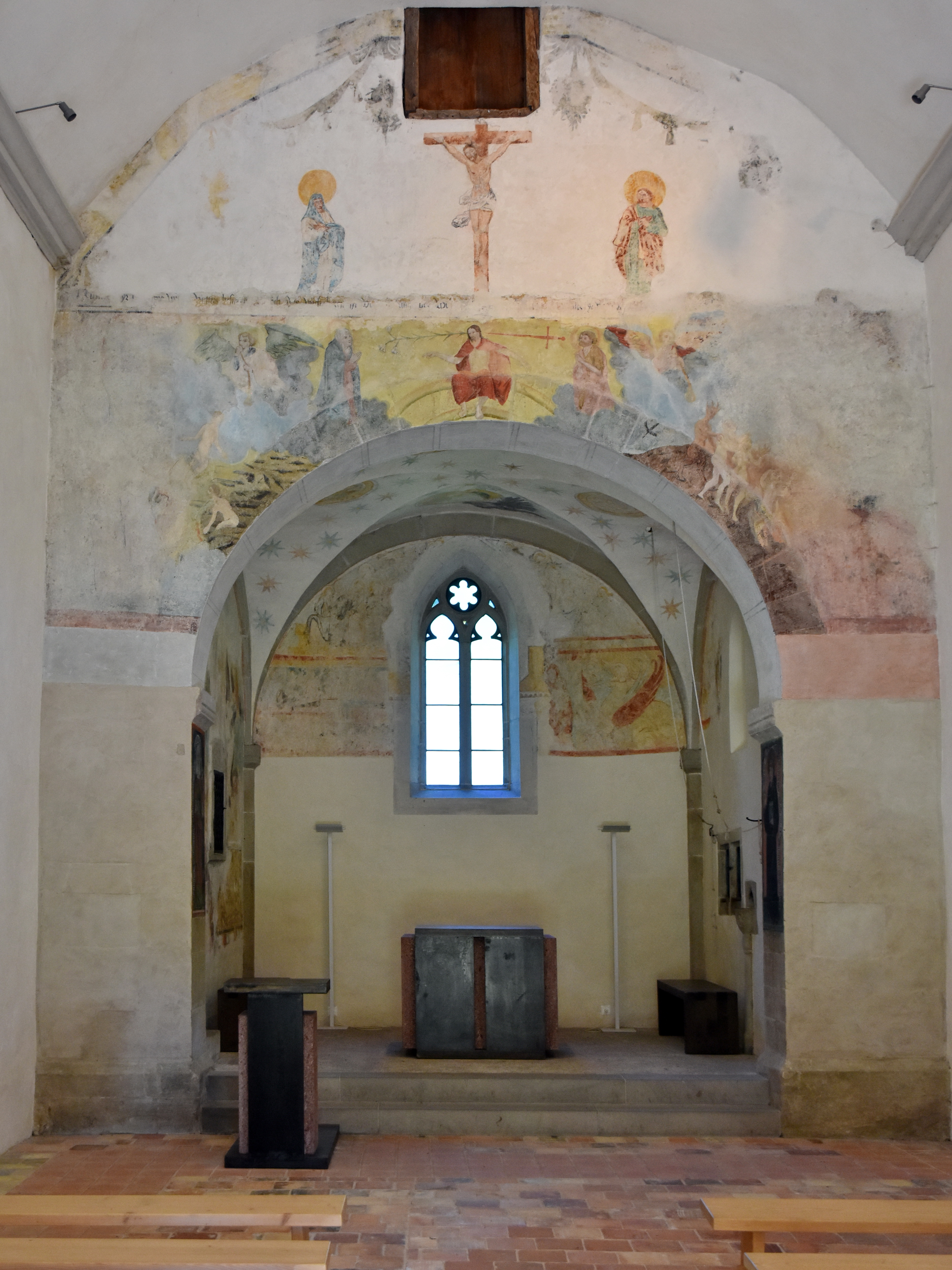
interior

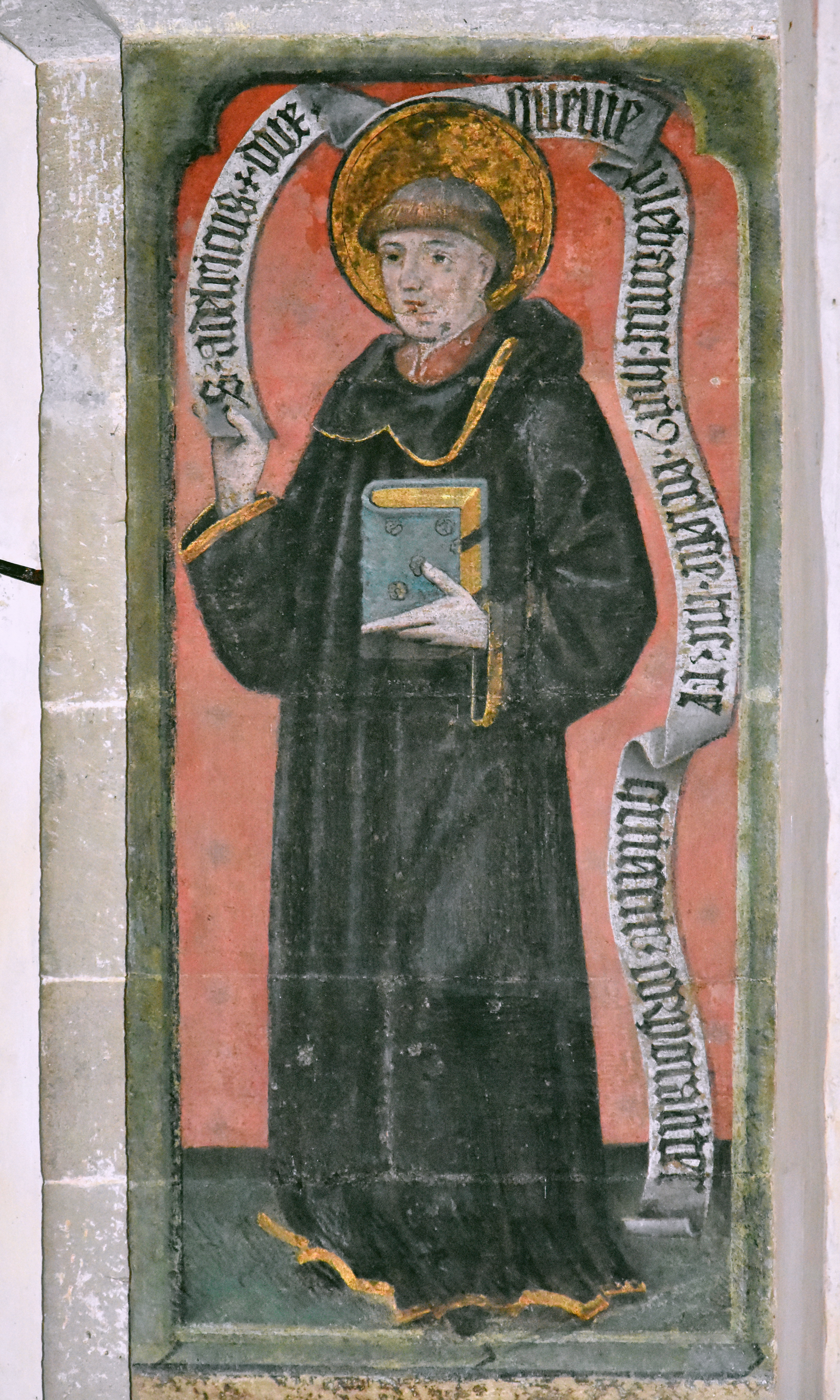
Saint Adalric, fresco in the church

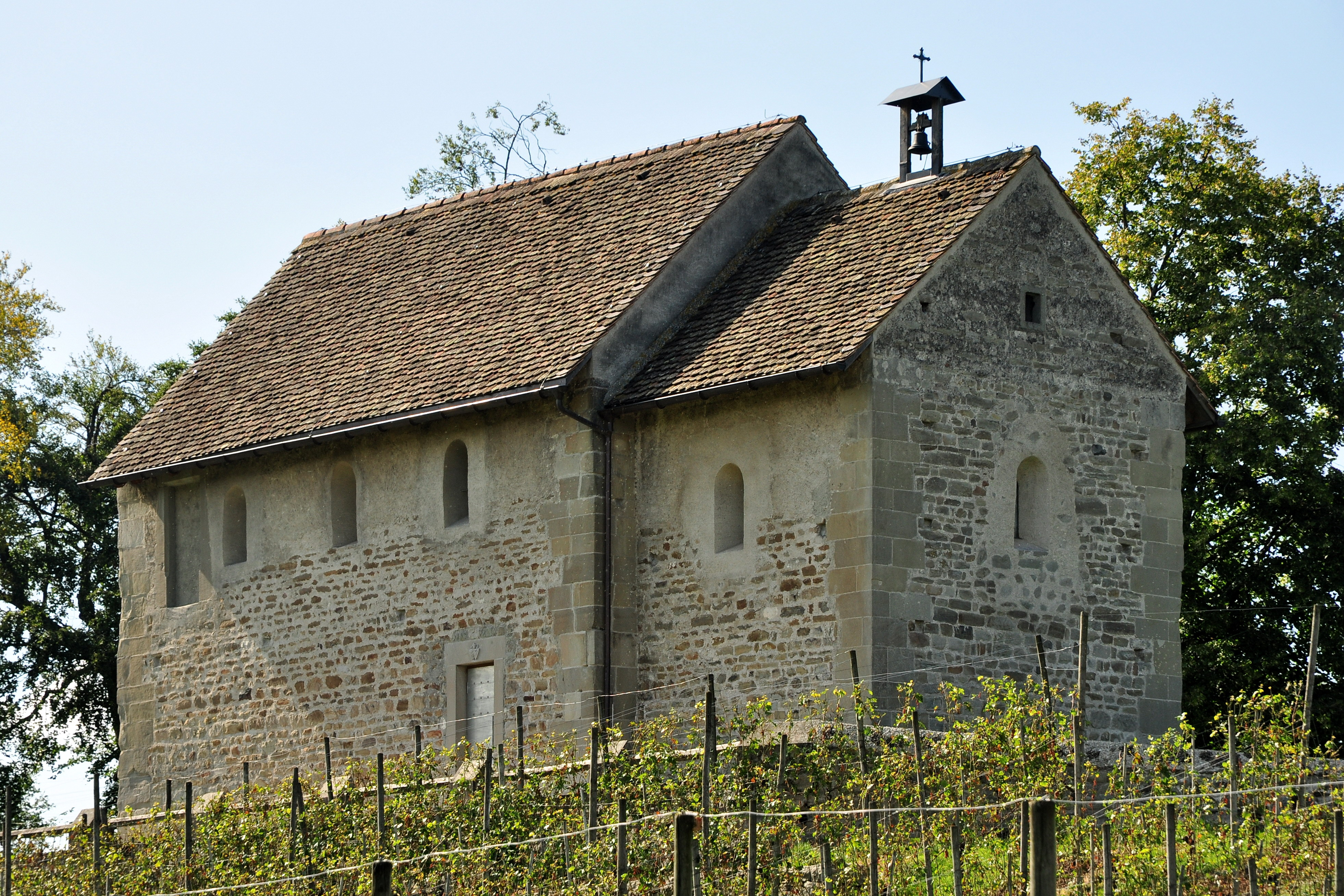
St. Martin chapel

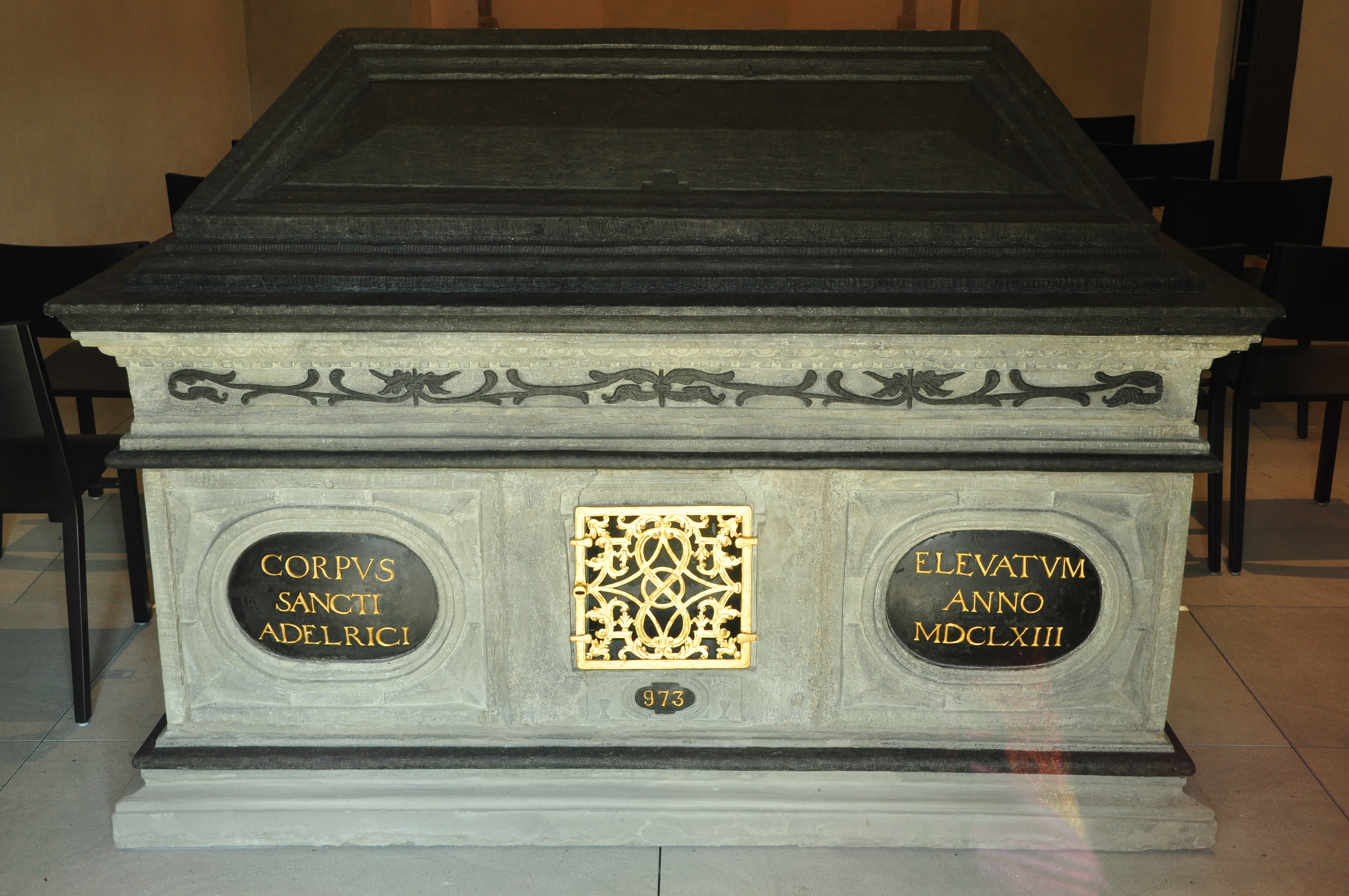
Saint Adalric's shrine

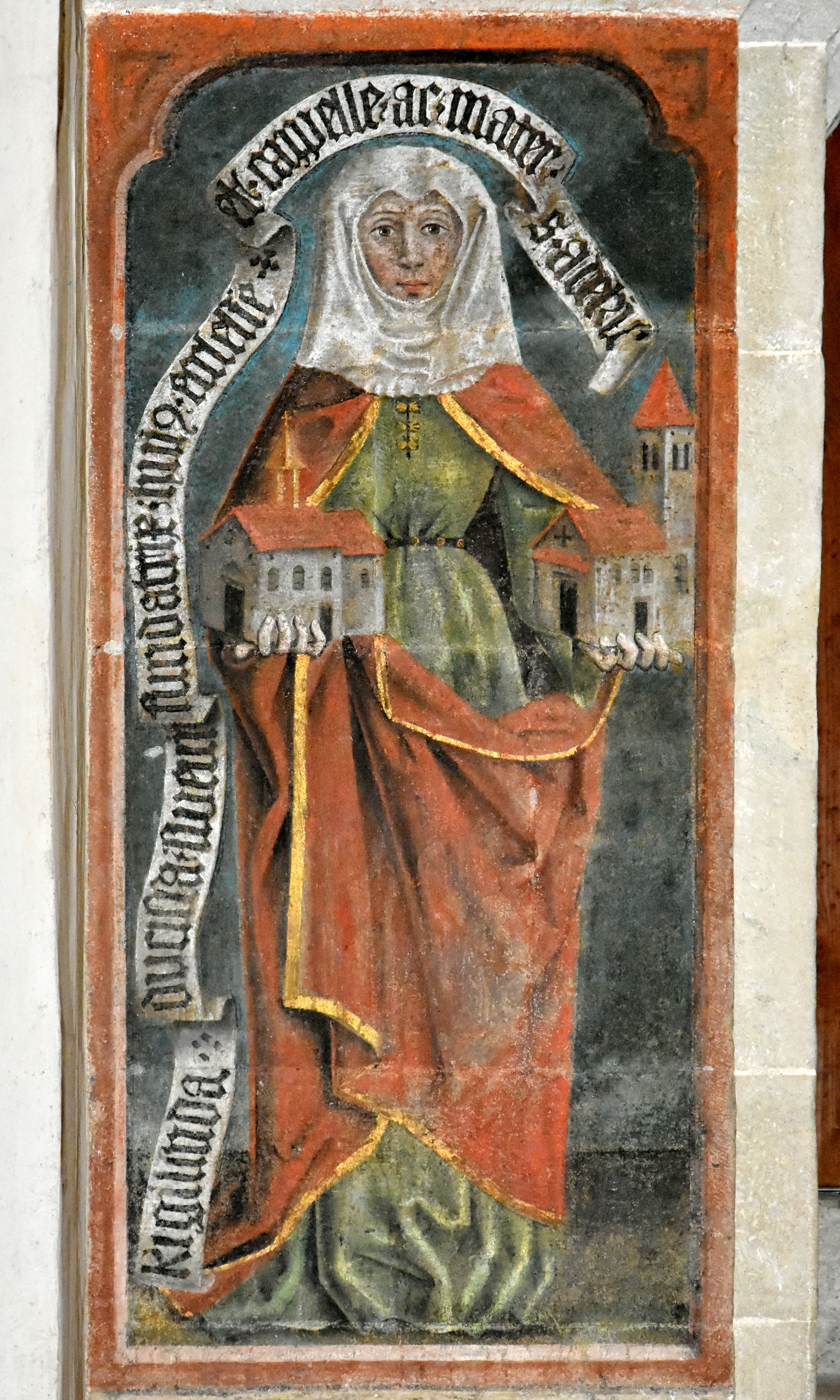
Noblewoman Regelinda of Swabia and the churches on the Ufenau island, St. Peter and Paul church

Saint Adalric's Relic, sealed in a shrine, were lost during 2nd Villmergen war in 1712. Zurich soldiers destroyed the altars and parts of both churches and have stolen St. Peter & Paul's two church bells. In 1736 St. Peter & Paul was rebuilt and the bells were replaced; St. Martin's chapel was renewed in 1790.

== 2016–2018 renovation ==
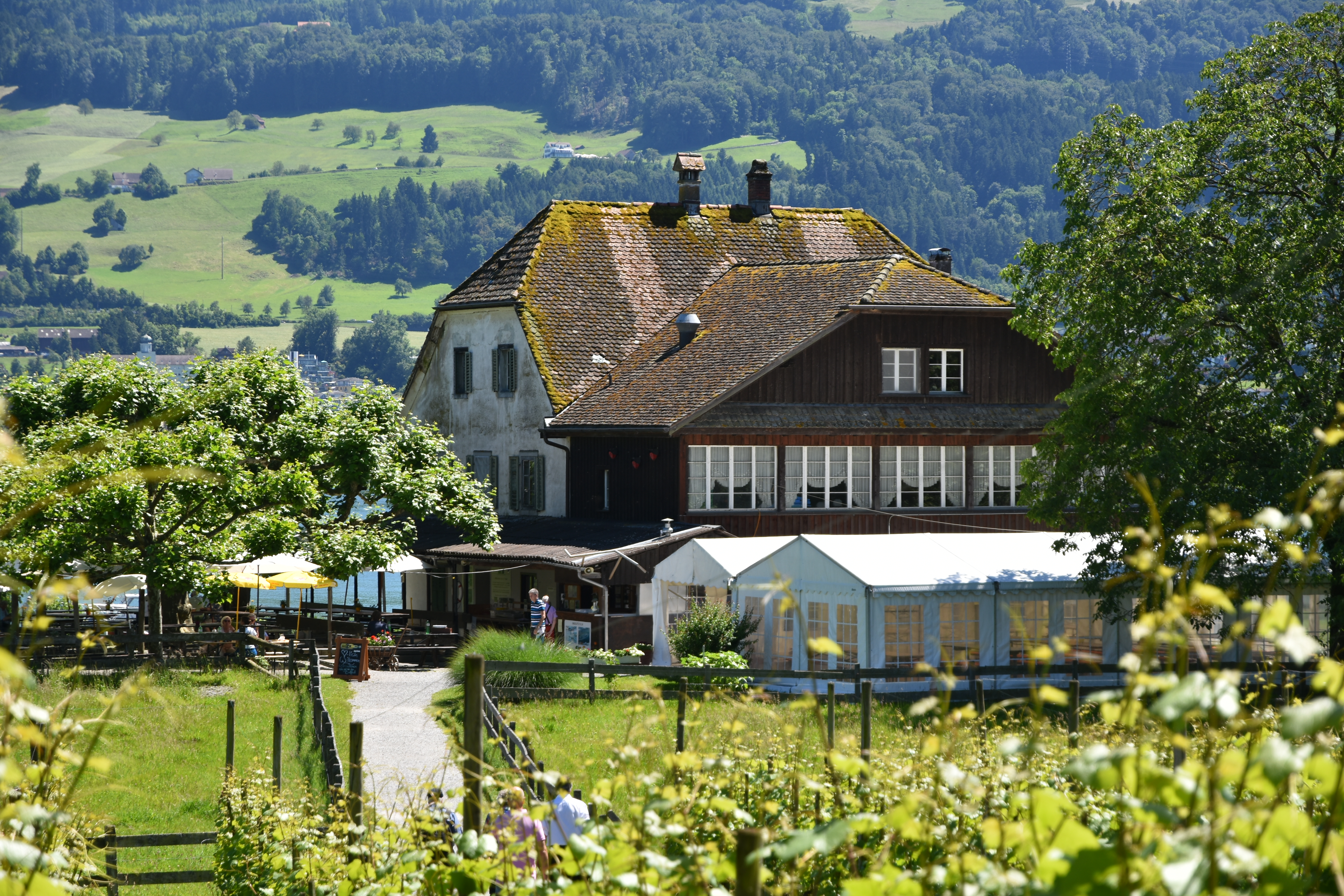
Zu den zwei Raben inn in June 2016

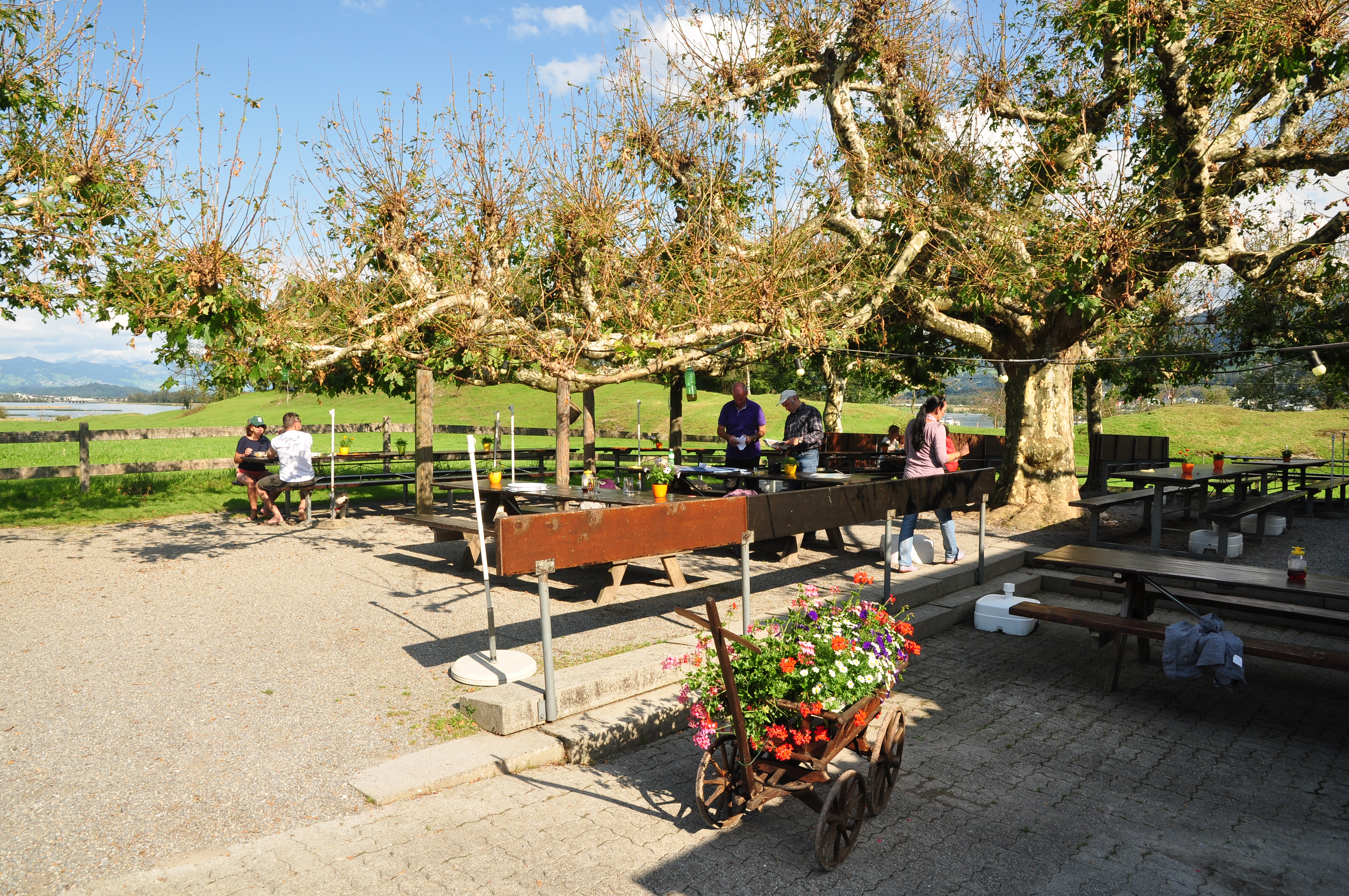

On 21 March 2015, the monks of Einsiedeln Abbey decided to make renovations to the buildings on Ufenau. The most prominent of these is Haus zu den zwei Raben (lit. House of the Two Ravens), built in 1681, which has housed a restaurant since 2007. The Abbey submitted a planning application on 14 August 2015 and estimated a total cost of 6.5 million Swiss francs, then hired architects Pius Bieri and Frank Roskothen to lead the work. The application was approved on 8 October 2015 and began shortly thereafter. The work cost 7 million Swiss Francs (CHF), of which four million francs were collected by the Friends of Ufenau Island, the municipality of Freienbach, and Canton Schwyz. For the missing funds, the Einsiedeln Abbey agreed the acquisition of a substantial share of the construction costs. The island was closed to the public until the completion of renovations in early 2018, officially reopening on the 23rd.

== Cultural heritage ==
Ufnau – correctly spelled «Ufnau», but «Ufenau» is commonly used – and the Frauenwinkel area were placed under conservation in 1927. Since 1993 Ufenau is a «Moorlandschaft von besonderer Schönheit und nationaler Bedeutung», i.e. a bog environment of extraordinary beauty and national importance. Ufenau and its two churches are listed in the Swiss inventory of cultural property of national and regional significance a Class A objects of national importance.

== Literature ==
- Gerold Späth: Poem Hebed Sorg. In: Ufnau – Insel der Stille, Rapperswil 2005.

== See also ==
- List of islands of Switzerland
