= Heilig Hüsli =

Coordinates: 47°13′20.90″N 8°48′53.7″E

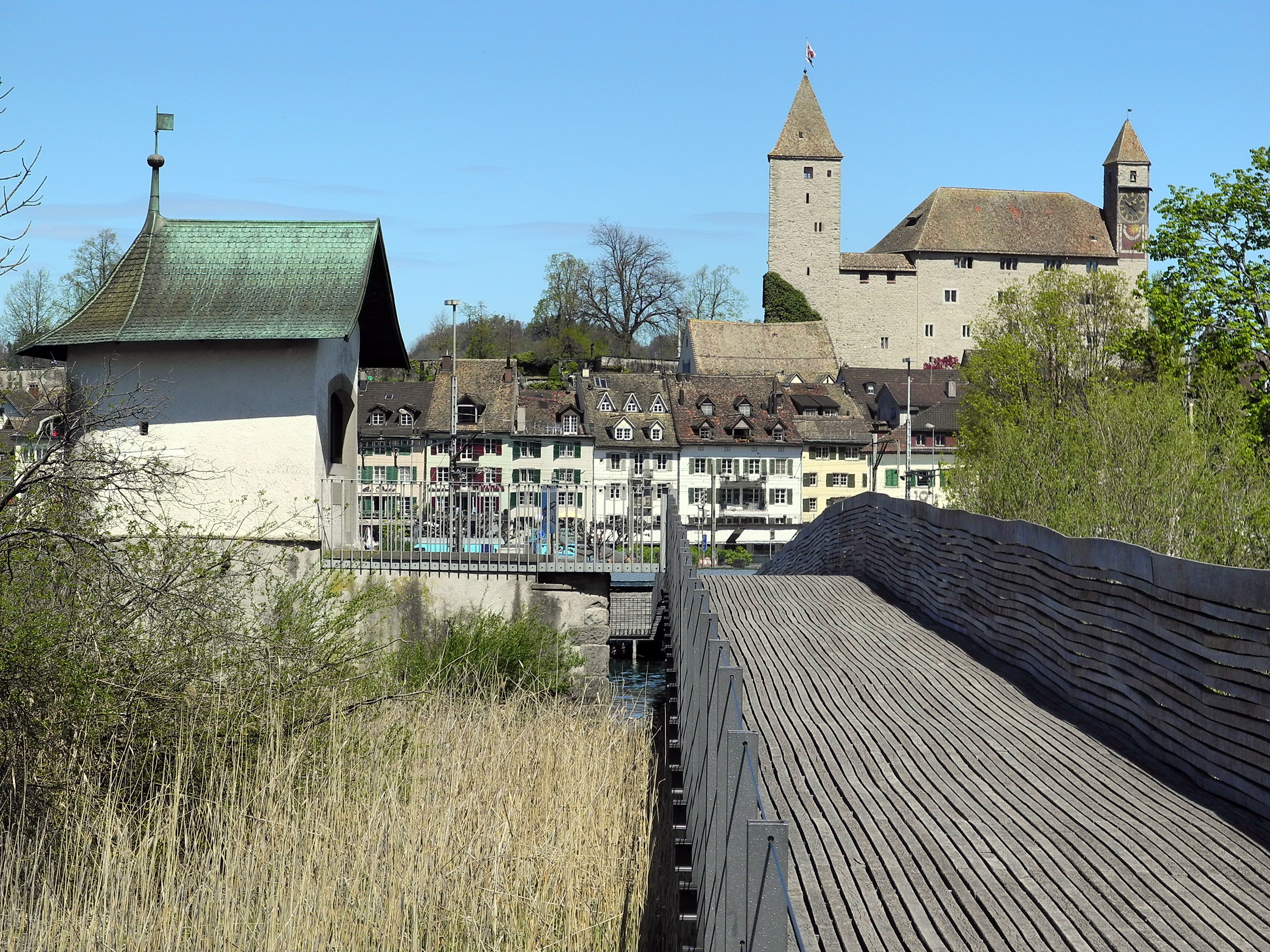
- Holzbrücke Rapperswil-Hurden, Seedamm to the left, Heilig Hüsli and Rapperswil respectively Rapperswil Castle and Lindenhof hill in the background
- Heilig Hüsli
- Country: Switzerland
- Denomination: Catholic Church
- Churchmanship: Chapel

Administration
- Diocese: Chur
- Parish: Rapperswil

Heilig Hüsli (Holy house) is a bridge chapel in Rapperswil, Canton of St. Gallen, Switzerland.

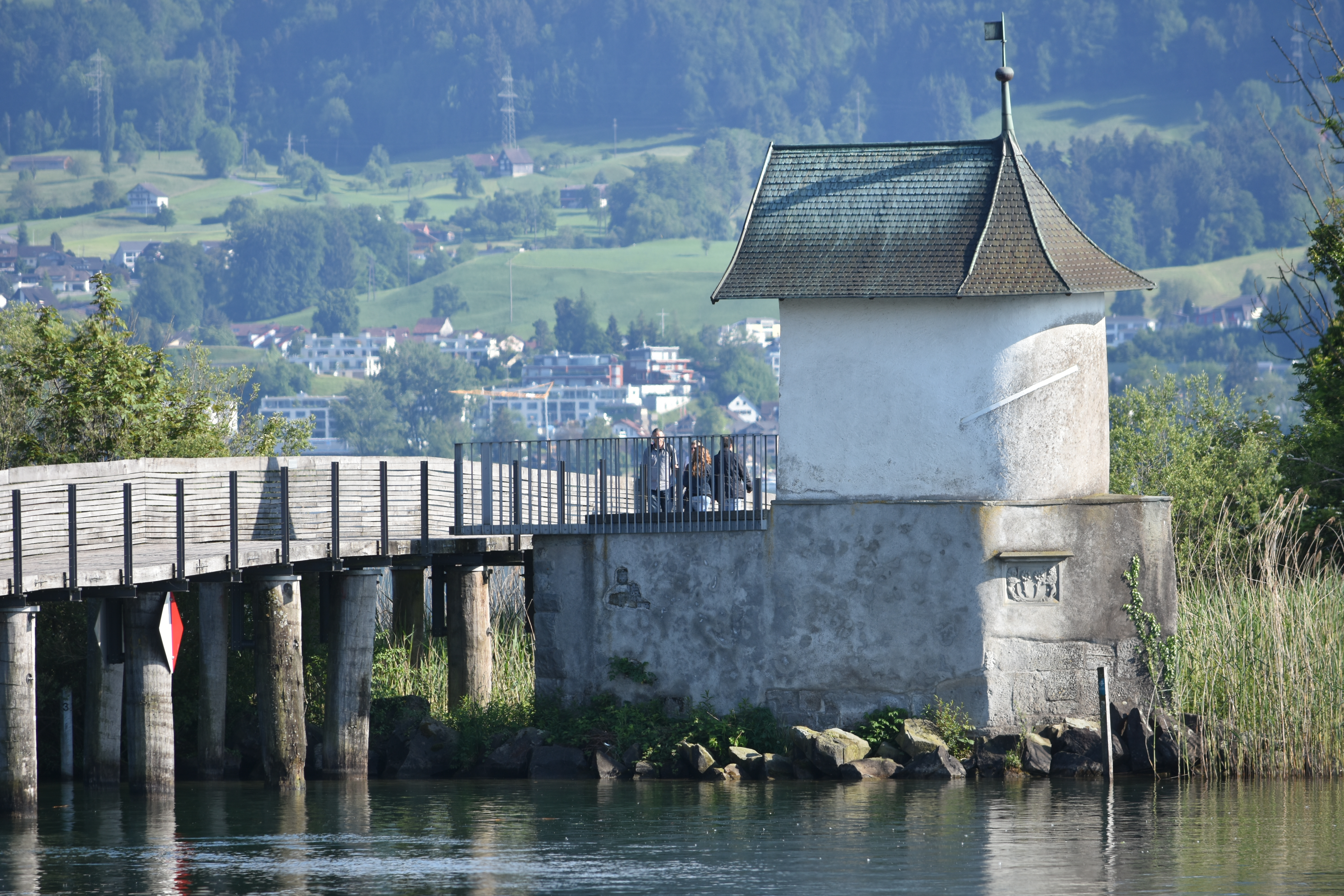

== Geography ==
The chapel is located next to the Seedamm, near the Rapperswil railway station. It is situated on a small island on upper Lake Zürich (Obersee) off of the Holzbrücke Rapperswil-Hurden, a historical wooden bridge that was reconstructed in 2001.

During formation of the Alps, layers of sediment were deposited by ancient bodies of water. This gave rise to the banded rocks that form the Lindenhof hill in Rapperswil, and the islands of Ufnau, Lützelau and Heilighüsli. During the last Ice Age the island was under a thick layer of ice. Over time, only the harder layers of conglomerate rock and sandstone remained after the erosion by the glacier, creating the islands.

== History ==
The chapel, built near the former medieval wooden bridge between Rapperswil and Hurden, was first mentioned in 1485 AD as a wooden prayer house or pilgrim's chapel. The pilgrimage route Jakobsweg (Way of St. James) leads through the region, from Wattwil over the Ricken Pass to Schmerikon on to Lachen and Buechberg, along the left bank of the upper lake to St. Meinrad Pass, or from Schmerikon along Obersee, passing Bollingen, Wurmsbach and Jona-Busskirch to Rapperswil and then crossing the wooden bridge towards Hurden. Another route leads over the Hörnli mountain through the Töss Valley, passing the former Rüti Abbey via Kempraten and Rapperswil and the wooden bridge to the St. Meinrad Pass towards the Einsiedeln Abbey.

According to an inscription, the present stone building dates back to 1551. The chapel became the site of an execution after a legal dispute over a pasture belonging to the Wydenchlösterli, a nunnery on the shore of the Jona River. The Wydenchlösterli was a small Beguine nunnery founded by the House of Rapperswil. In the years before the Reformation in Zürich, its last superior, Katharine Scheuchzer (Katharina Schüchter) fought that the nunnery should be dissolved, and asked the neighboring Rüti Abbey and the Old Swiss Confederacy for support. When an epidemic in the Rapperswil hospital broke out in 1563, Scheuchzer was accused of witchcraft. Although the Tagsatzung's verdict of 1543 was in favor of the small nunnery, after cruel torture, the old woman was sentenced by the town council to death, put in a bag, and drowned in the Obersee lake at Heilig Hüsli chapel. The property of the nunnery was transferred to the hospital.

After the Seedamm was built in 1878, the Heilig Hüsli chapel was the only remaining structure of the original medieval wooden bridge. It stood isolated in the lake and was not accessible to visitors until the reconstruction of the former wooden bridge was completed in 2001.

== Architecture ==
The chapel stands on an approximately 4 metres (13 ft) high base, and measures just 2 metres (7 ft) x 3 metres (10 ft), with eaves standing at about 3.5 metres (11 ft). It has a west-facing apse, in which a miraculous fresco was once installed. The altarpiece, whose outlines are still visible in the interior, is preserved together with a representation of the Virgin Mary with the body of Christ in the Stadtmuseum Rapperswil-Jona. The fresco was replaced by a replica by the Swiss artist Marlies Pekarek, and was inaugurated and blessed on 7 April 2011 with the intention of returning the bridge chapel to its original purpose. The interior of the chapel is visible only through the latticed east side. Following an old custom, pilgrims throw coins into the interior.

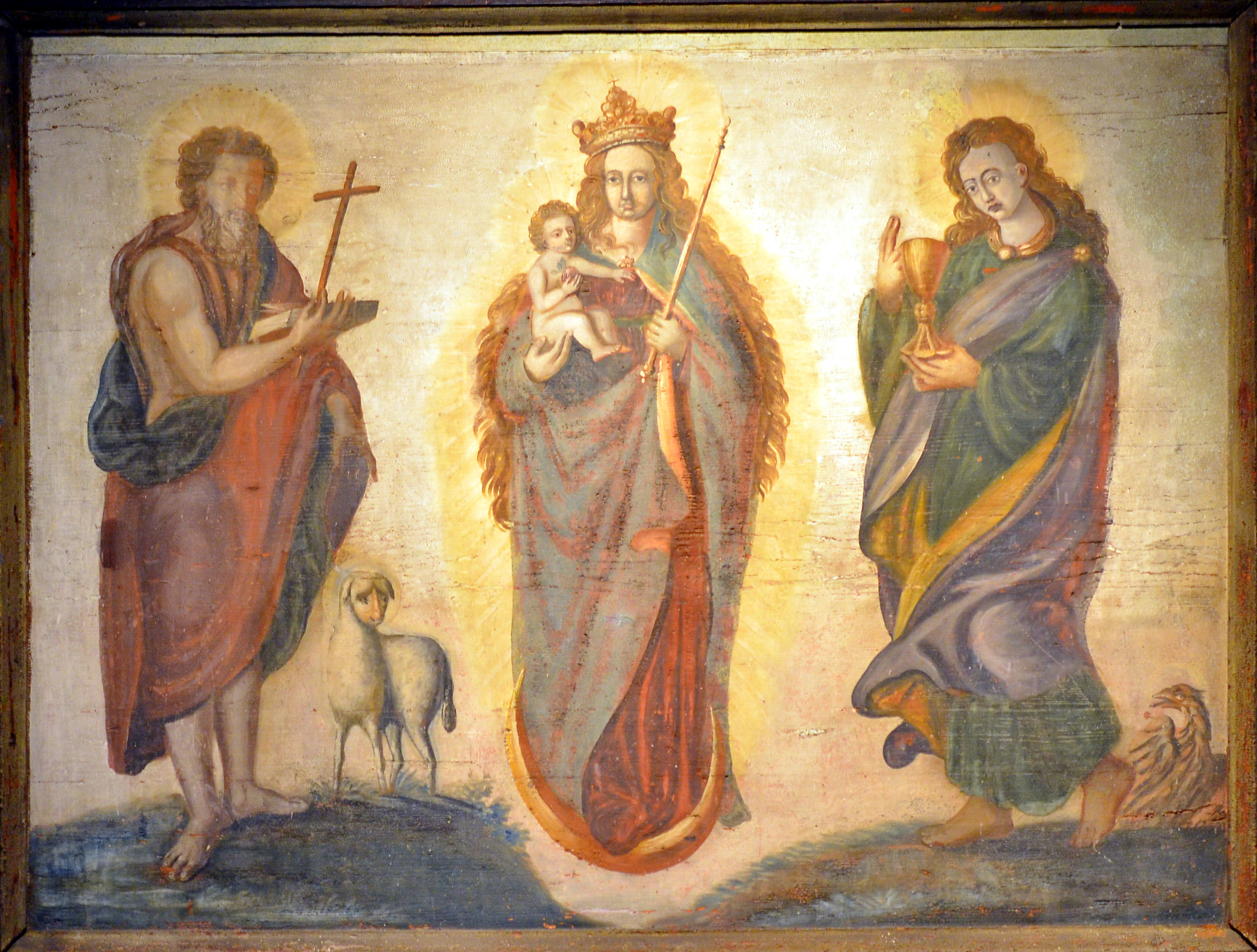
16th-century altar fresco, Stadtmuseum Rapperswil

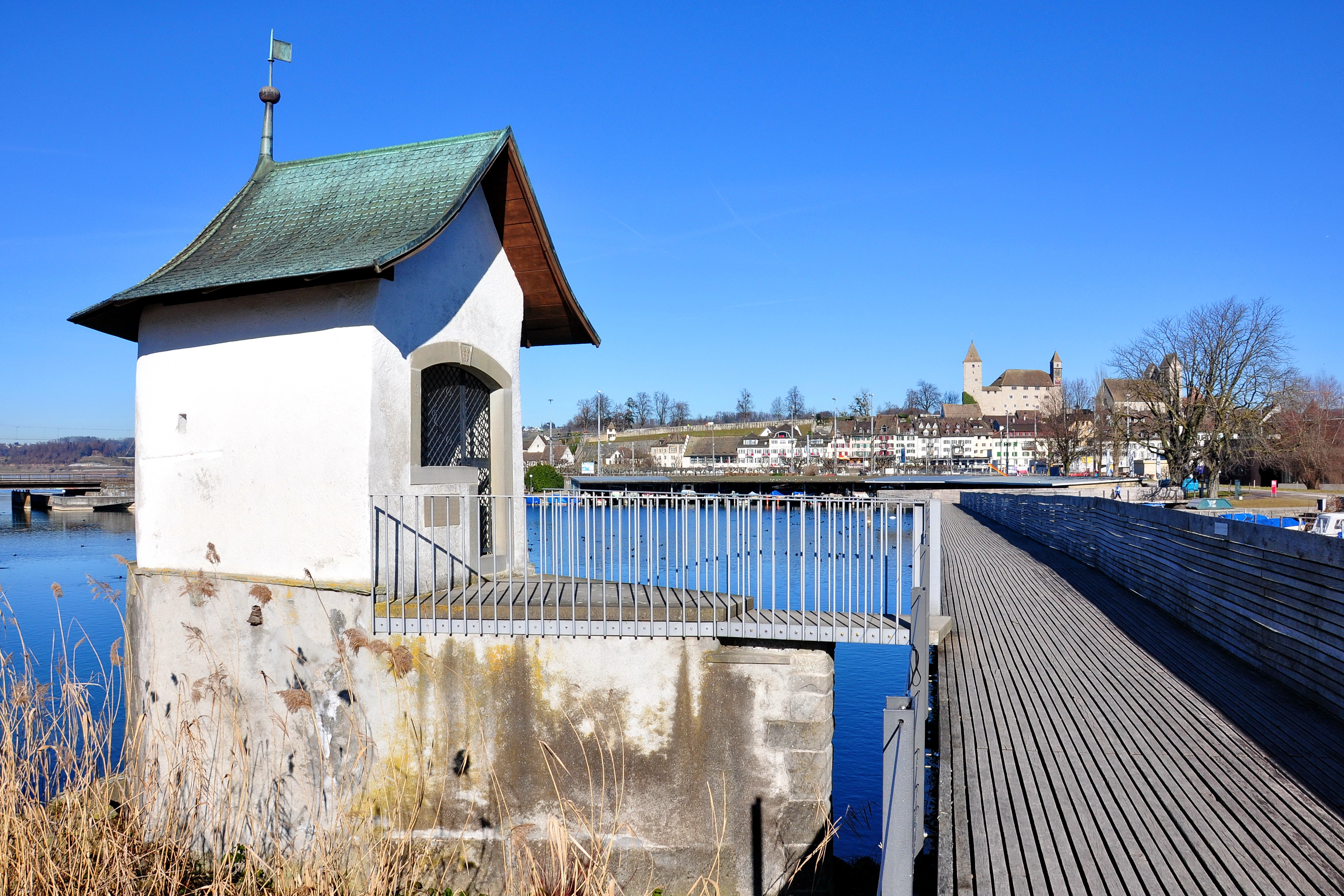
The bridge chapel, Seedamm and Rapperswil in the background

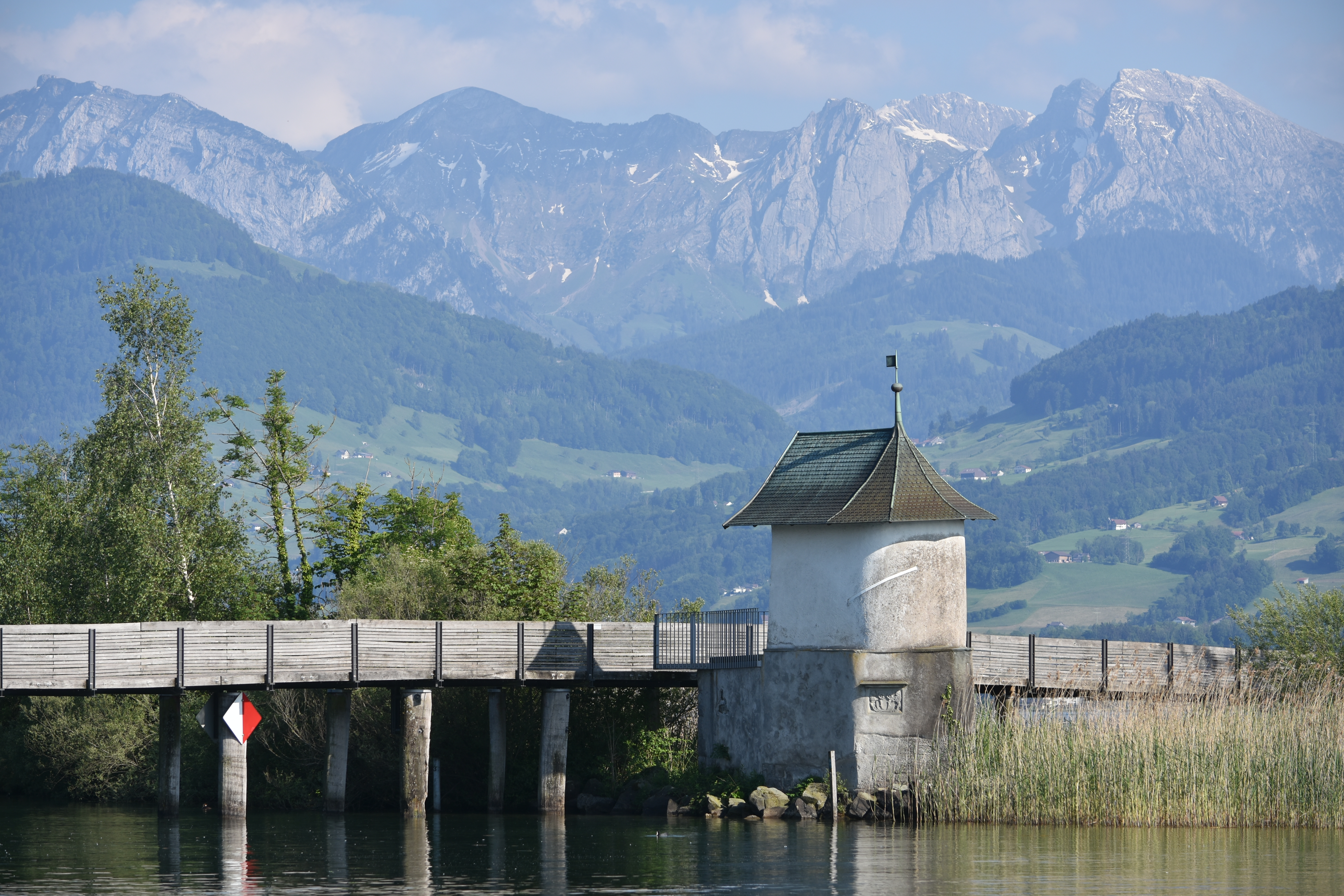
The wooden bridge, as seen from nearby Seedamm, Obersee and Wägital in the background

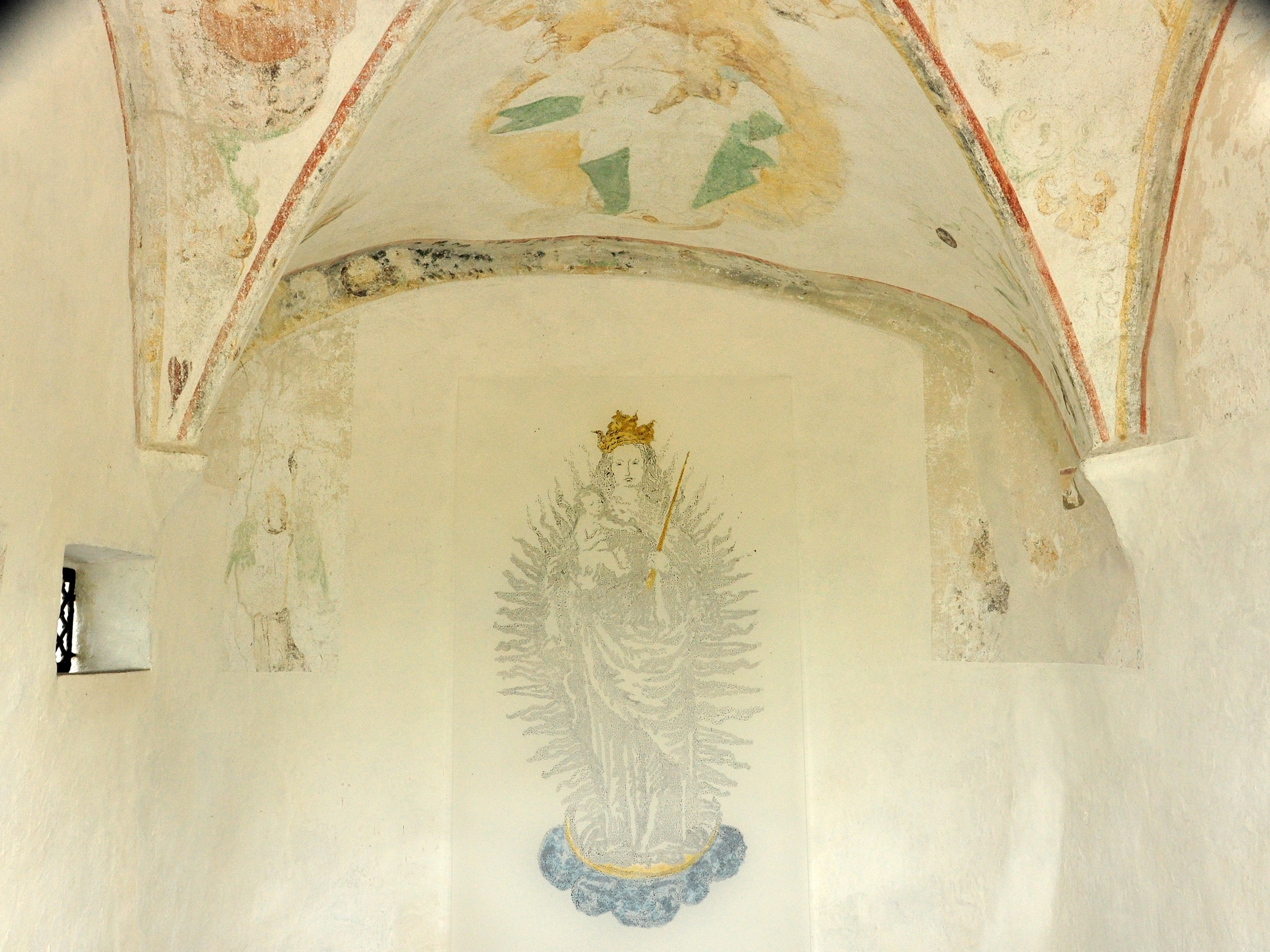
Fresco inside the chapel

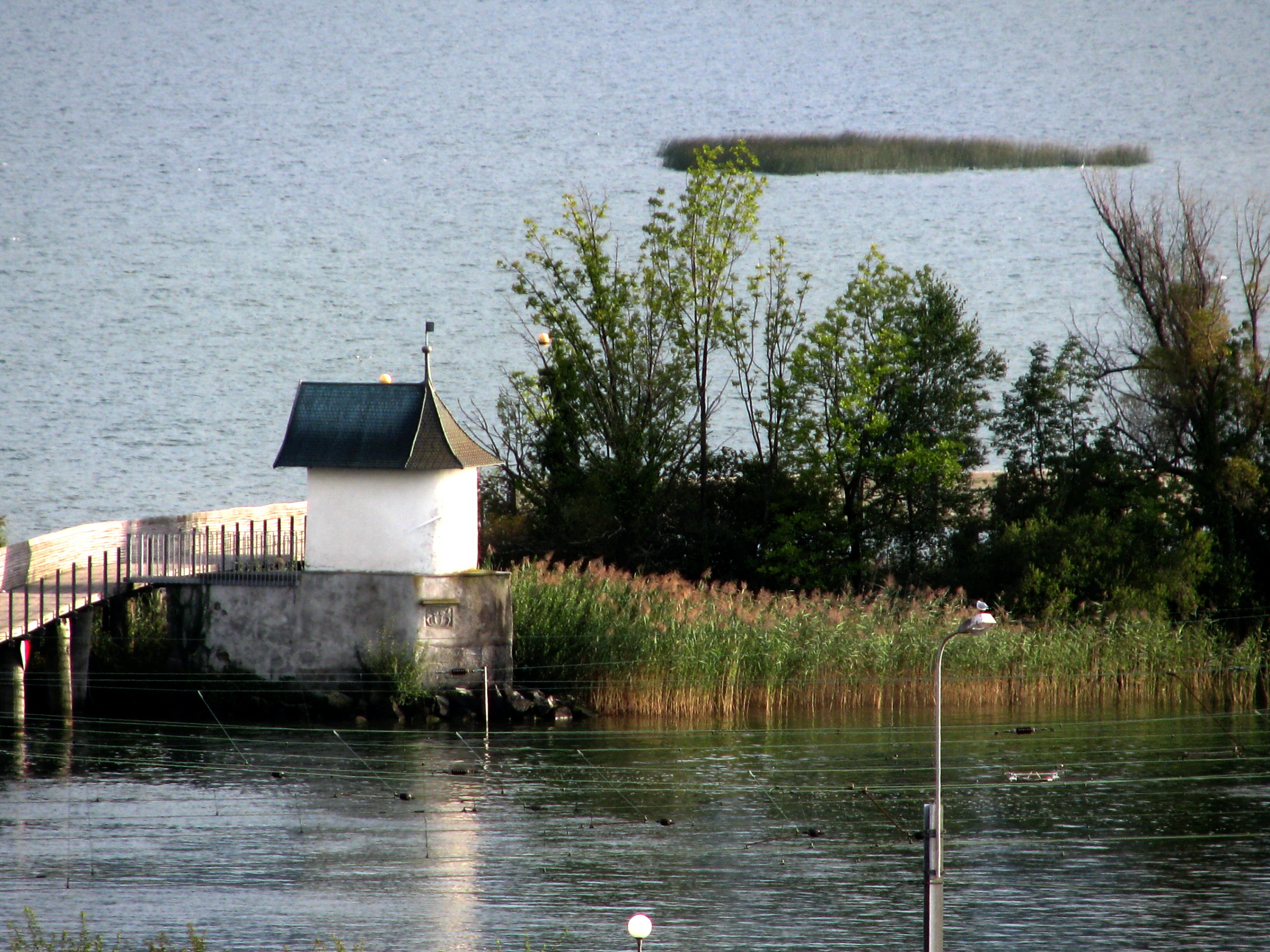
As seen from Schloss Rapperswil

As of today the small chapel is owned by the Ortsgemeinde (citizenry's community) Rapperswil. The chapel was partially renovated in 1908, 1930, 1957, 2011 and 2015.

== Cultural heritage ==
The chapel is under protection since 1907 and the building itself is listed in the Swiss inventory of cultural property of national and regional significance as an object of regional importance.
