= Hurden =

- Former municipality
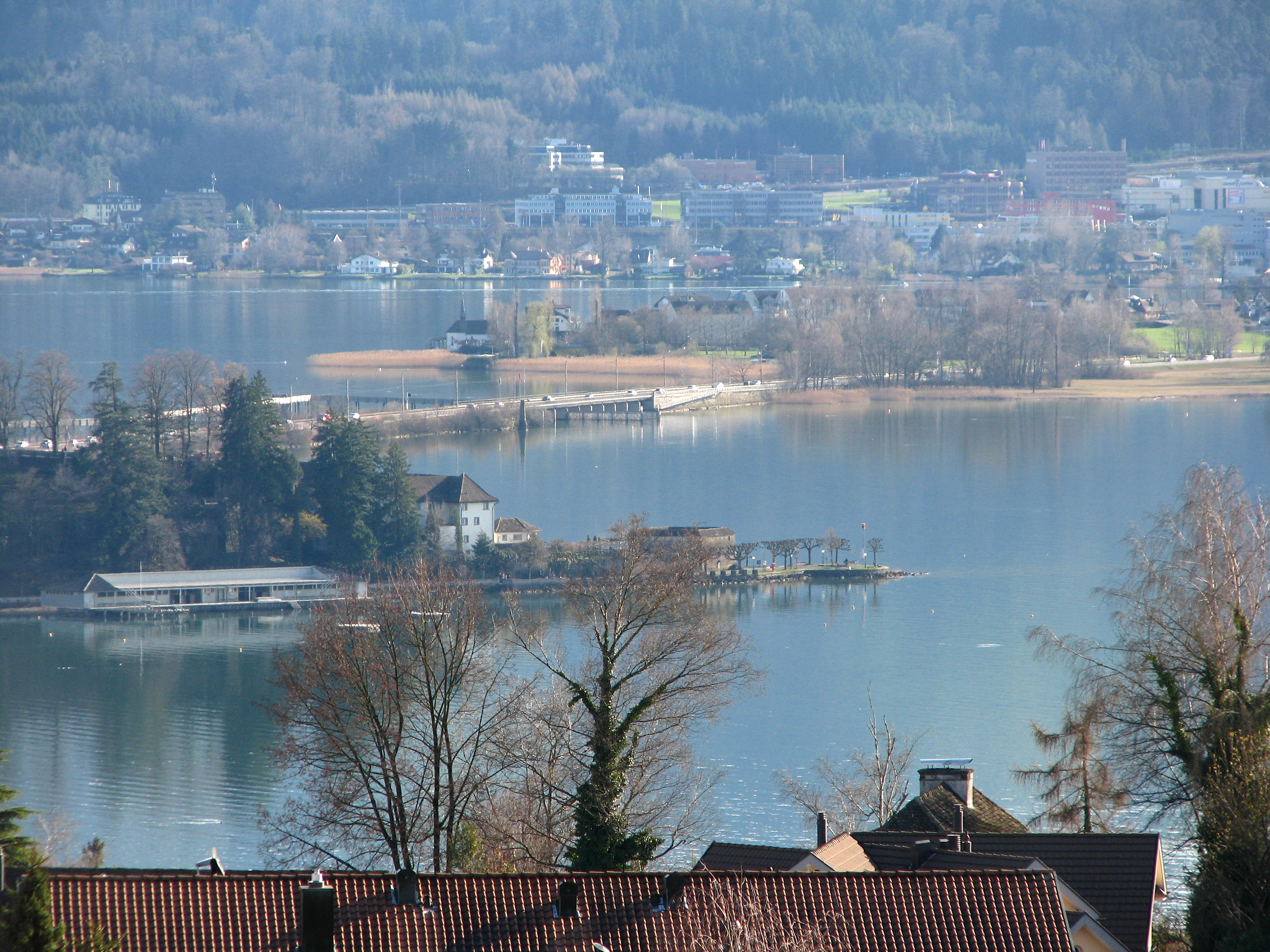
- Seedamm and Hurden, as seen from Frohberg hill in Kempraten-Lenggis, the Capuchin monastery in Rapperswil to the left, Pfäffikon in the background
- Location of Hurden
- Location within Switzerland Location within Canton of Schwyz
- Coordinates: 47°11.6′N 8°46.6′E
- Country: Switzerland
- Canton: Schwyz
- District: Höfe
- Municipality: Freienbach

Area
  - Total: 1.31 km^{2} (0.51 sq mi)
- Elevation: 408 m (1,339 ft)

Population (December 2008)
  - Total: 271
  - Density: 207/km^{2} (536/sq mi)
- Time zone: UTC+01:00 (CET)
  - Summer (DST): UTC+02:00 (CEST)
- Postal code: 8640
- SFOS number: 1322
- ISO 3166 code: CH-SZ
- Surrounded by: Altendorf, Switzerland, Pfäffikon, Rapperswil
- Website: www.freienbach.ch

Hurden is a village in the municipality of Freienbach in the canton of Schwyz in Switzerland. First mentioned in 1217, the name "de Hurden" was used for the peninsula and for the fish traps made of woven work, called "Hürden" or "Hurden", which were used by the locals.

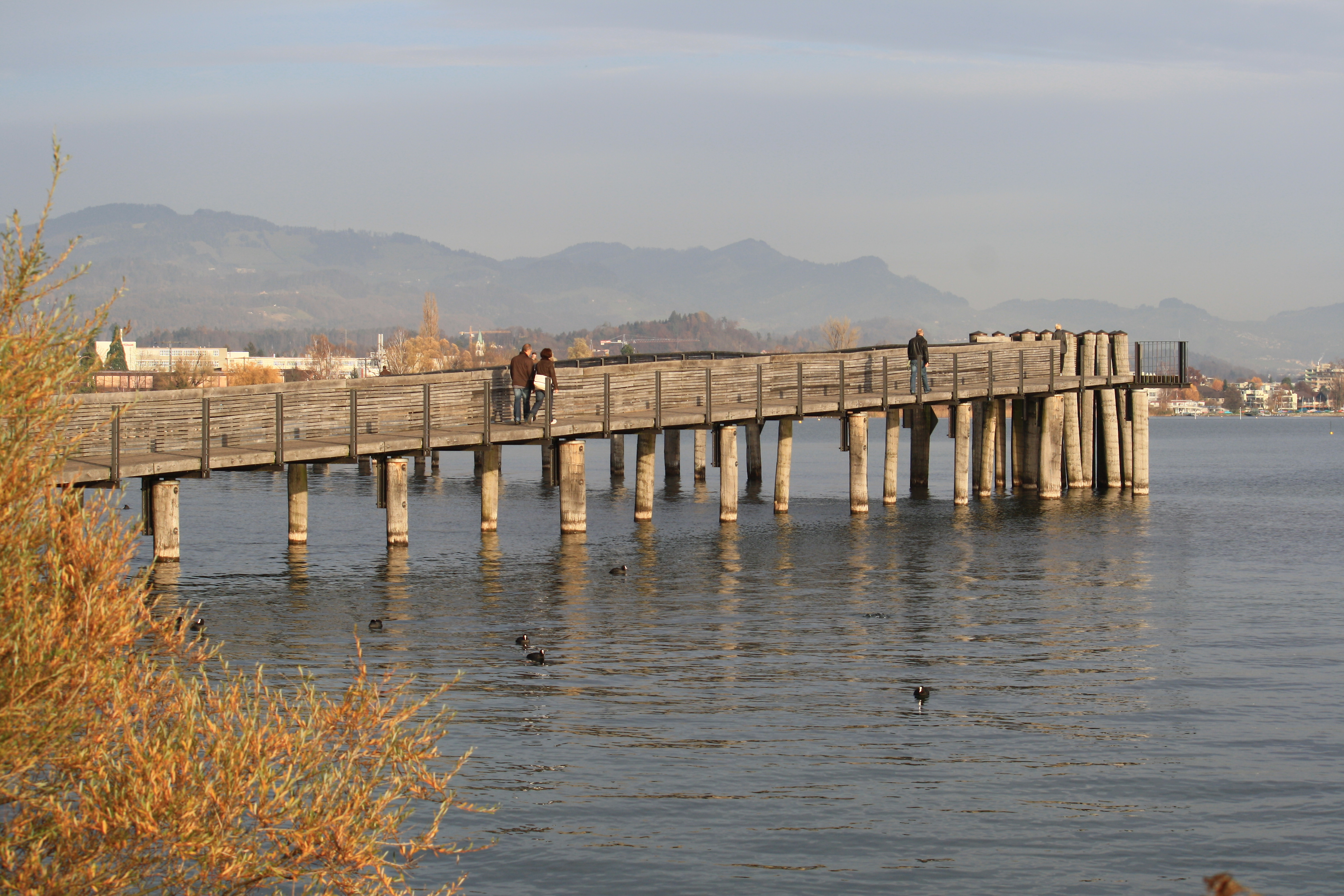
Holzbrücke Rapperswil-Hurden as seen from Hurden, Rapperswil to the left, Jona to the right

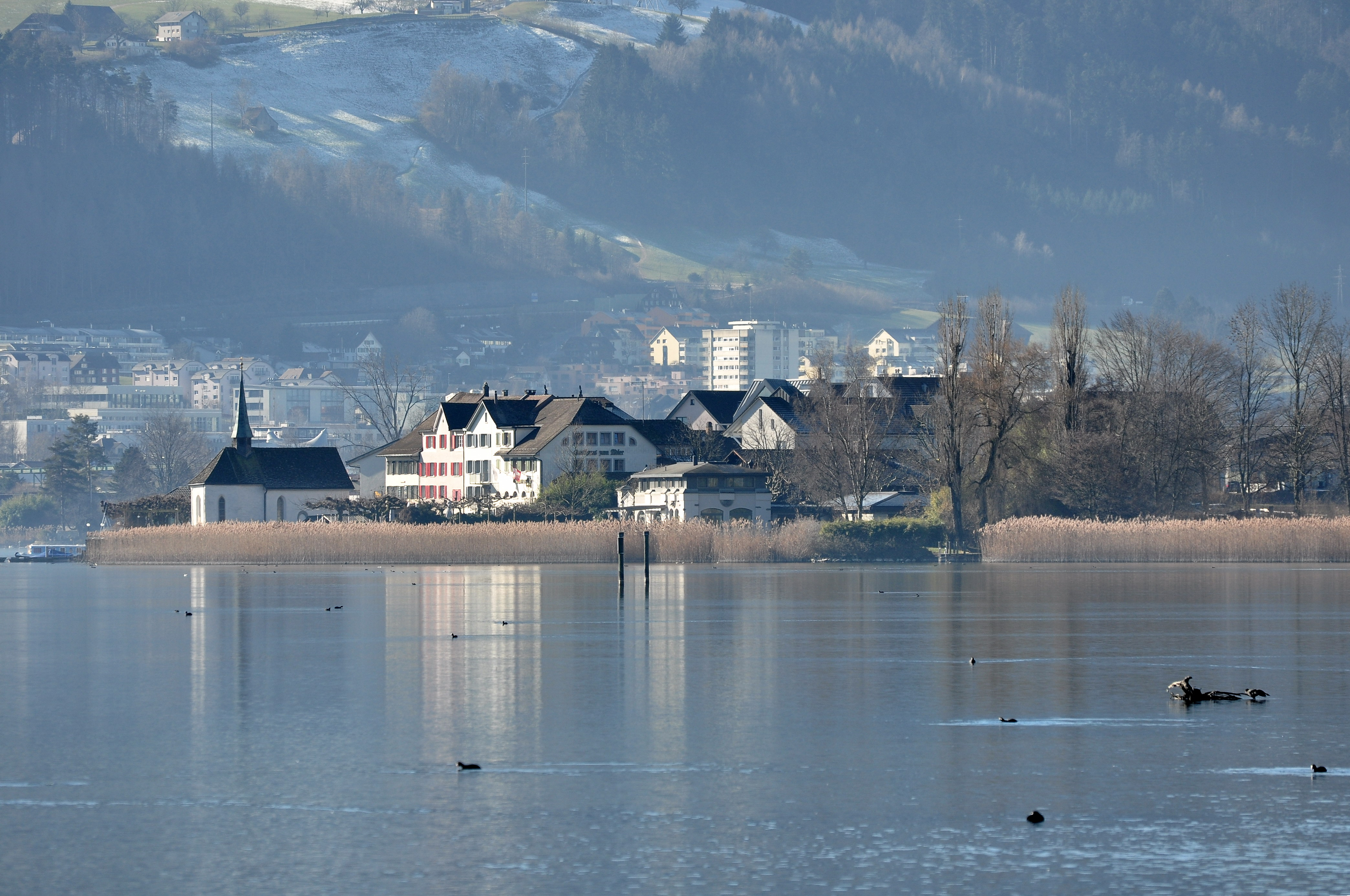
Hurden and Obersee (upper Lake Zürich) as seen from Holzbrücke in Rapperswil

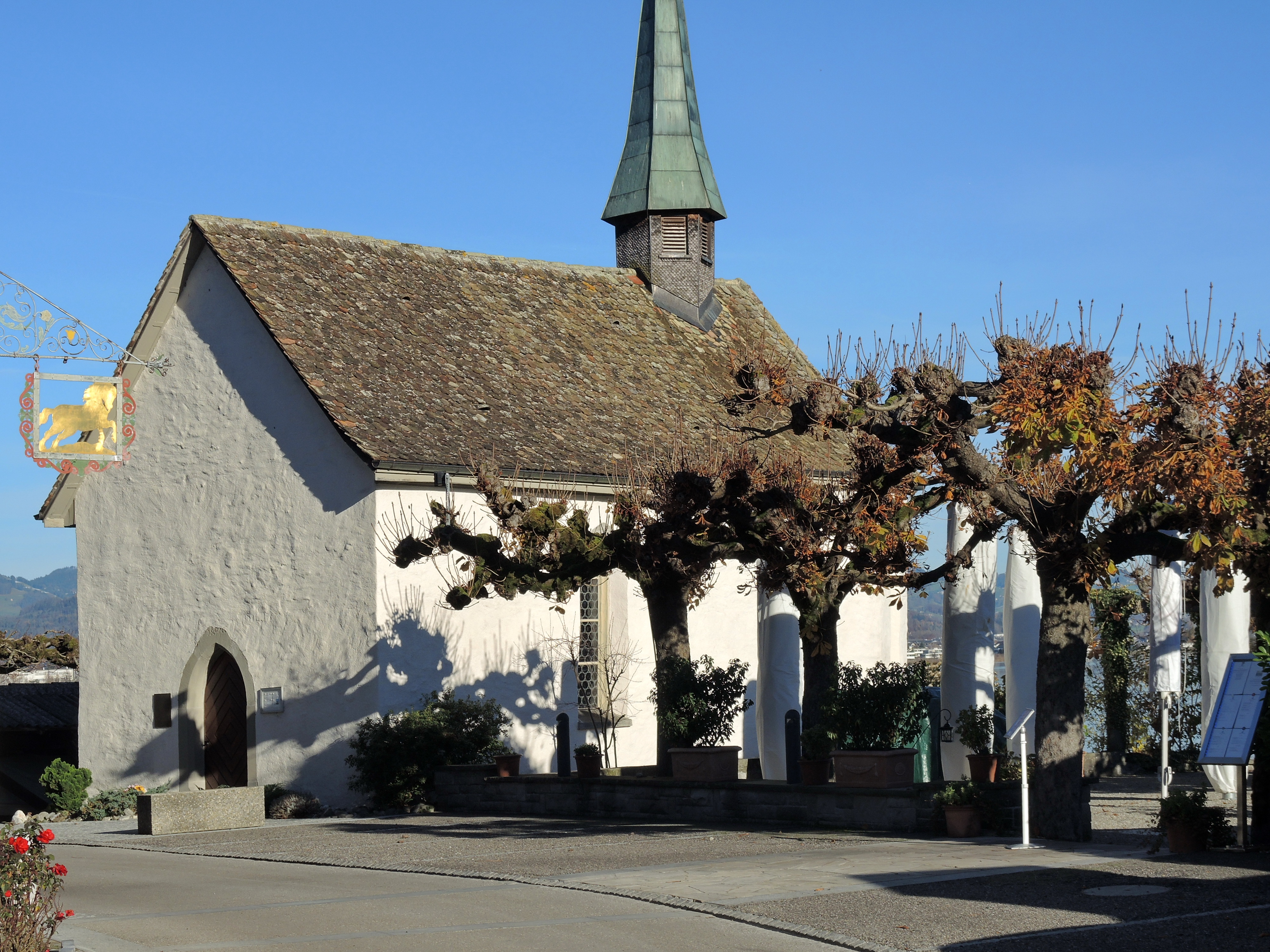
Kapelle zu Ehren der heiligsten Dreieinigkeit (Holy Trinity chapel) in Hurden

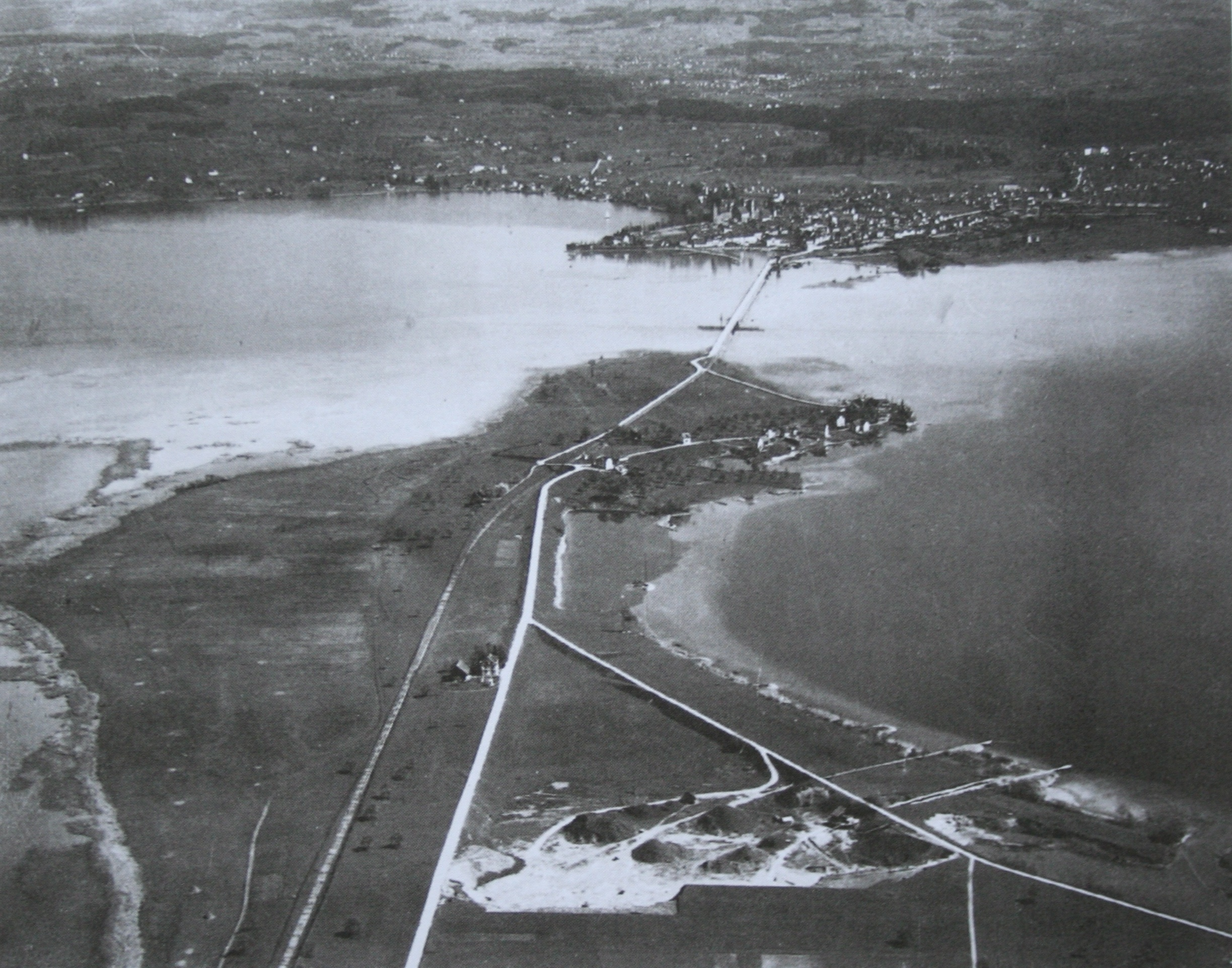
Hurden, Seedamm and Rapperswil on an aerial photography by Walter Mittelholzer (1929)

== Geography ==
The village of Hurden is located on a peninsula protruding from the southern shore of Lake Zürich at its narrowest point. The peninsula has its origin in the retreat of the Linth glacier at the end of the last glacial period when Lake Zürich was formed. This retreat left a moraine across the valley now occupied by Lake Zürich. The higher southern section of this moraine extends above the lake's water level and forms the peninsula, whilst the lower northern section forms a shallow section in the otherwise deep lake. Together these separate Lake Zürich into two parts, the larger lower lake to the north-west, and the smaller upper lake (Obersee) to the east.

The artificial Seedamm uses a combination of artificial causeways and bridges to cross the shallow water between the tip of the peninsula to Rapperswil on the northern shore of the lake, and carries both road and rail links. To the west of the Seedamm, there is a wooden bridge for pedestrians (Holzbrücke Rapperswil-Hurden), which was built in 2001 as a reconstruction of the first bridge between eastern and western lakesides. Since the construction of the Hurden ship canal, across the base of the peninsula, the natural peninsula has been transformed into an artificial island. The Sternenbrücke bridge carries both road and railway across the ship canal.

At Hurden also the Frauenwinkel protected area is situated. Its name origins from a donation by the emperor Otto I in 965 AD to the pin Unserer lieben Frau (Our Lady) to the Einsiedeln Abbey.

== Transport ==
The village is transited by the Rapperswil–Pfäffikon railway line and by a major road, both of which cross the Seedamm. Hurden railway station, in the village, is served by the Zürich S-Bahn line S40 and was served by S-Bahn S5 before the timetable revision of late 2015. In 1943 southern Hurden was divided by the construction of the Hurden ship canal, which connected the upper to the lower Lake Zürich. Now the ships of the Zürichsee-Schifffahrtsgesellschaft (ZSG) were able to pass from Lake Zürich to the upper Lake Zürich, and the peninsula actually was a real island which was cut off from the mainland. The Sternenbrücke bridge, across the Hurden ship canal, was renewed between March 15 and November 2010 to allow 40 ton trucks to cross the Seedamm.

== History ==
Archaeological relicts have been found at the Technikum island settlement, and the remains of a first wooden bridge (1523 BC, reconstructed in 2001) to Hurden located on the Obersee lakeshore nearby the so-called Heilig Hüsli at the northwestern part of the Seedamm area. The four neighbouring Prehistoric settlements, as well as the early lake crossings, are part of the UNESCO World Heritage Site Prehistoric Pile dwellings around the Alps, including also the settlements Freienbach–Hurden Rosshorn and Freienbach–Hurden Seefeld. Around 1523 BC, also the first lake crossings on Obersee between Rapperswil and Hurden were discovered in 2001, followed by several reconstructions at least until the late 2nd century AD when the Roman Empire built 6 meters (20 ft) wide wooden bridge under Empire Marcus Aurelius (161-180).

Historians mention a 10th-century ferry station assumably at the so-called Einsiedlerhaus in Rapperswil – in 981 AD as well as the vineyard on the Lindenhof hill – between Kempraten on lake shore, Lützelau and Ufenau island and assumably present Hurden, which allowed the pilgrims towards Einsiedeln to cross the lake before the prehistoric bridge at the Seedamm isthmus was re-built. By 1358, ferry services between Rapperswil and Hurden are mentioned. Between 1358 and 1360, Rudolf IV, Duke of Austria, built a wooden bridge across the lake that has been used to 1878 – measuring approximately 1,450 meters (4,760 ft) in length and 4 meters (13 ft) wide. A small wooden bridge from Ufenau island to Hurden is mentioned around 1430, so-called Kilchweg in die Uffnow, meaning chorchgoing to the Ufnau island. During Old Zürich War in 1443 the bridge was set on fire, and as a result of the Second Battle of Villmergen in 1712, Hurden was reigned by the Protestant cantons of Zürich, Bern and Glarus.

During the Helvetic Republic, in 1798, Hurden became part of the new established Distrikt Rapperswil in the Canton of Linth, and in 1803 it was part of the new established Pfäffikon. In 1873 the Swiss federal parliament approved the construction of the today's stone dam and bridge. Beginning in 1990, luxurious villas were widely built in Hurden, which in part on newly reclaimed area created for and with a private harbour.

In 2001 a new wooden footbridge was opened alongside the dam for the first 840 meters (2,760 ft) meters of the crossing. It was built in quite the same place as the original bridge linking Rapperswil with the nearby bridge chapel (Heilig Hüsli).

== Cultural Heritage ==
Located on Obersee lakeshore in Hurden and situated at the Seedamm isthmus between the Zürichsee and the Obersee lake area, the area was in close vicinity to the prehistoric lake crossings, neighbored by four Prehistoric pile dwelling settlements: Freienbach–Hurden Rosshorn, Freienbach–Hurden Seefeld, Seegubel and Rapperswil-Jona–Technikum. Because the lake has grown in size over time, the original piles are now around 4 metres (13 ft) to 7 metres (23 ft) under the water level of 406 metres (1,332 ft).

As well as being part of the 56 Swiss sites of the UNESCO World Heritage Site Prehistoric pile dwellings around the Alps, the settlements are also listed in the Swiss inventory of cultural property of national and regional significance as Class A objects of national importance.

== See also ==
- Prehistoric pile dwellings around the Alps
