= Holzbrücke Rapperswil-Hurden =

Wooden pedestrian bridge crossing the Obersee part of Lake Zurich in Switzerland

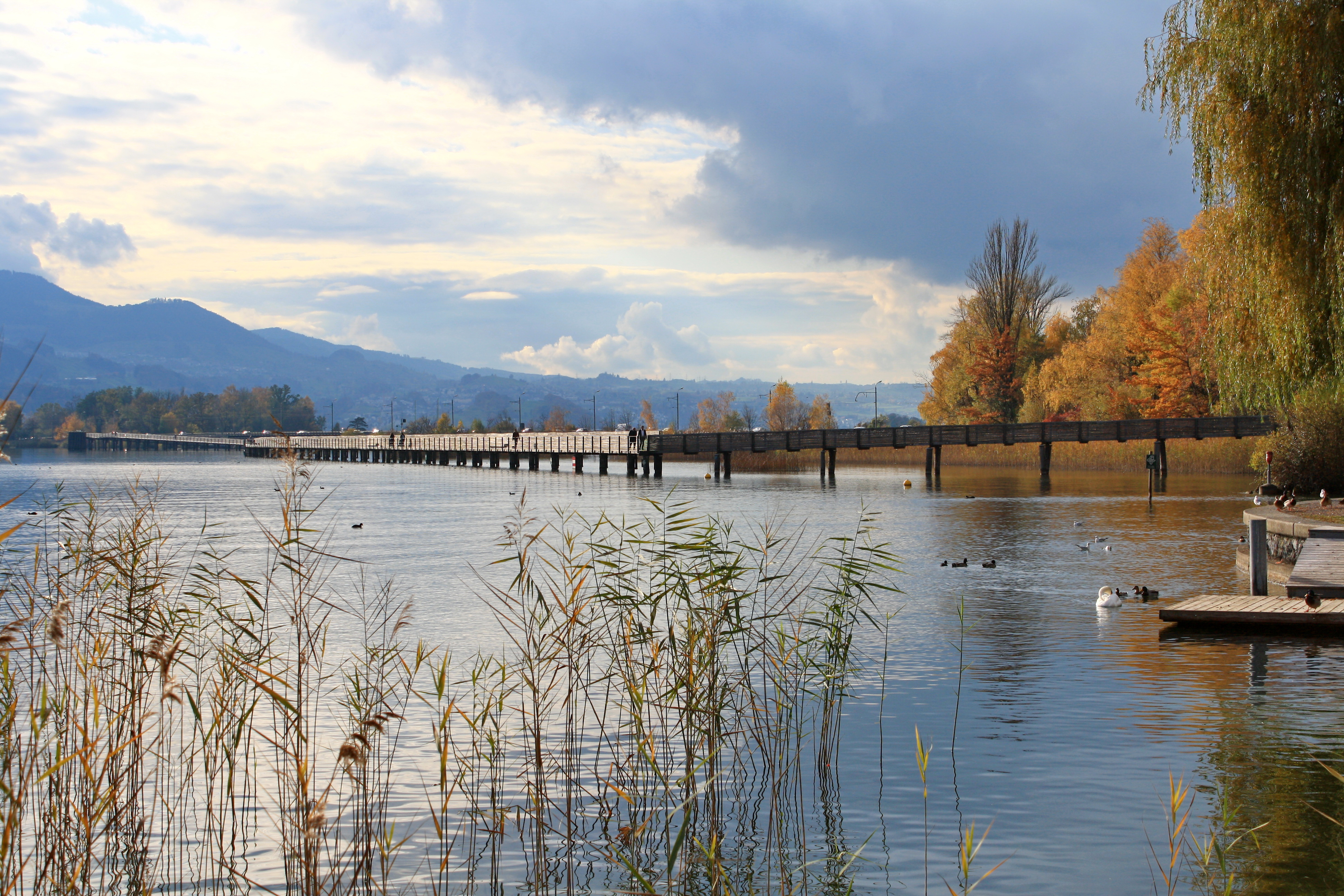
- The bridge as seen from Rapperswil
- Coordinates: 47°13′21″N 8°48′54″E
- Carries: Footpath
- Locale: Rapperswil and Hurden

Characteristics
- Material: Solid oak with steel components, 233 piles
- Total length: 841 metres (2,759 ft)
- Width: 2.4 metres (7 ft 10 in)
- Height: 1.5 metres (4 ft 11 in)
- Clearance above: 1.15 metres (3 ft 9 in)

History
- Opened: 6 April 2001

Location
- Interactive map of Holzbrücke Rapperswil-Hurden

Holzbrücke Rapperswil-Hurden is a wooden pedestrian bridge between the city of Rapperswil and the village of Hurden crossing the Obersee (the upper part of Lake Zurich) in Switzerland. On 6 April 2001, the footbridge was opened. With a length of 841 metres (2,759 ft) it is the longest wooden bridge in Switzerland.

The wooden bridge has many predecessors. Wooden structures enabling lake crossings in the same area were already built thousands of years ago.

== Geography ==
The pedestrian bridge is located next to the so-called Seedamm, a stone and metal structure which includes two bridges. Like the Seedamm it connects Rapperswil in the canton of St. Gallen and Hurden in the canton of Schwyz. The water area between Rapperswil and Hurden is the narrowest and shallowest part of Lake Zurich. While the Seedamm separates the Obersee part from the main part of Lake Zurich, the pedestrian bridge crosses the Obersee.

== Earlier wooden bridges ==
=== Neolithic and Bronze Age ===
The oldest remains of bridges or possibly wooden footpaths that were found at the archaeological site Hurden Rosshorn date back to the era of the Horgen culture. Many traces of Early, Middle and Late Bronze Age lake-crossing structures were discovered on the western side of the dam at the Hurden Rosshorn site.

Several prehistoric pile dwelling settlements were built in the vicinity of the prehistoric lake crossings between Rapperswil and Hurden, most notably at Freienbach–Hurden Seefeld and Rapperswil-Jona–Technikum. The 17th century BC island settlement found at the Technikum site is especially interesting because it existed at the same time as some lake crossing structures found at the Hurden Rosshorn site.

The archaeological sites Hurden Rosshorn, Hurden Seefeld and Technikum are all part of the UNESCO World Heritage Prehistoric pile dwellings around the Alps.

=== Hallstatt period, Roman era, Early Middle Ages ===
Remains of wooden bridges from the Hallstatt period (647 BC), the Roman era (AD 165) and the Early Middle Ages (AD 741) were also found at the Hurden Rosshorn site. The Roman bridge was built under Emperor Marcus Aurelius (161–180). It was 6 metres (20 ft) wide.

=== The wooden bridge 1360–1878 ===
Before a new bridge was opened in 1360, ferries were traveling between Rapperswil and Hurden. Between 1358 and 1360, Rudolf IV, Duke of Austria, built a wooden bridge across the lake. This bridge was used until 1878. It was approximately 1,450 metres (4,760 ft) long and 4 metres (13 ft) wide. 564 oak piles were installed for the bridge.

The bridge was part of a pilgrimage route belonging to the Ways of St. James. It was used by pilgrims who wanted to get to the Einsiedeln Abbey or even to Santiago de Compostela. A bridge chapel called Heilig Hüsli, which still exists today, was built in 1551.

The construction of the Seedamm began in 1875. When it was finished in 1878, the wooden bridge was demolished. The Heilig Hüsli chapel was then the only remaining structure. It stood isolated on a rock and was not accessible to pedestrians until the new wooden bridge was opened in 2001.

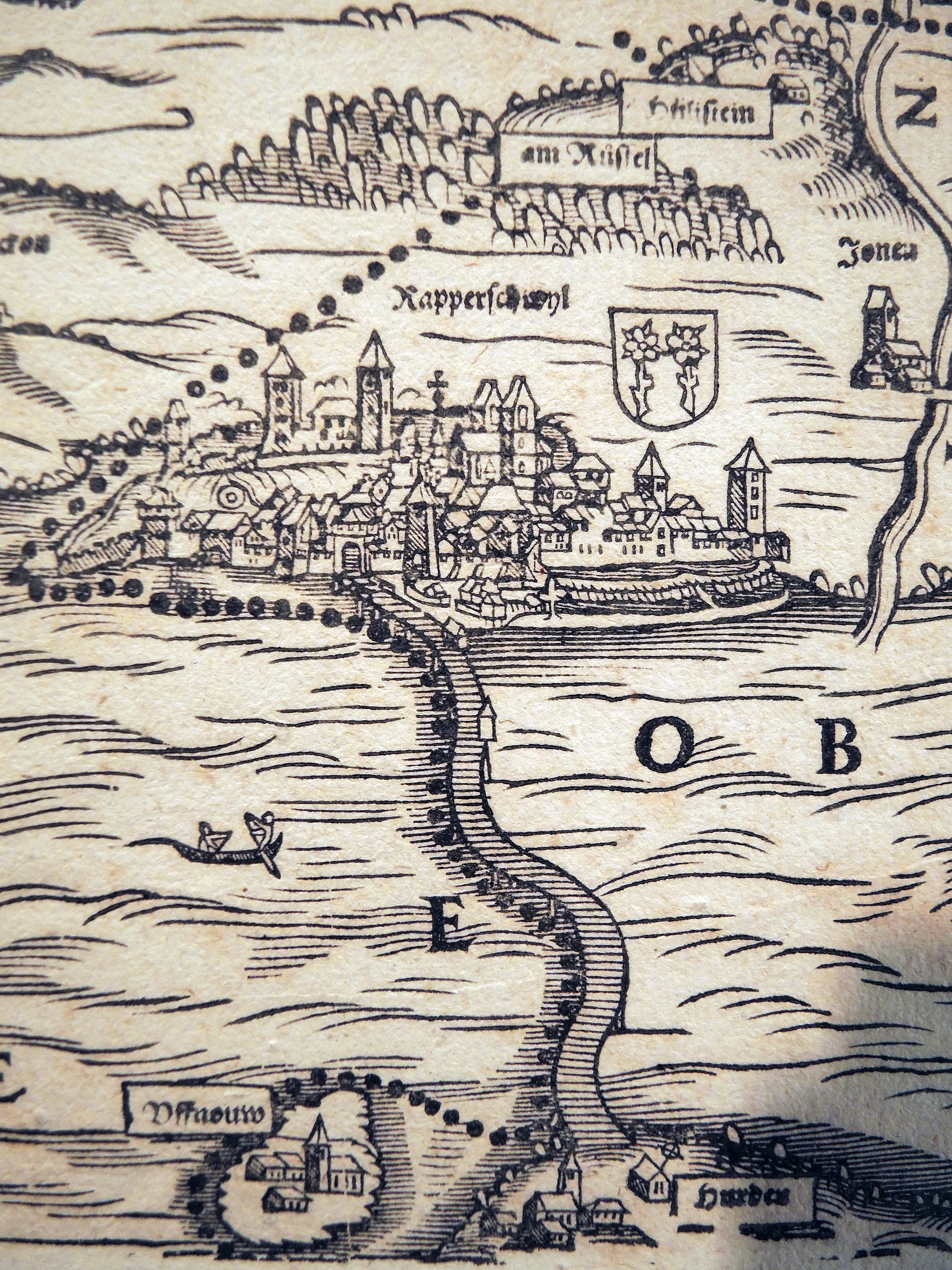
The bridge between Hurden (bottom) and Rapperswil on a map by Jos Murer (1566)

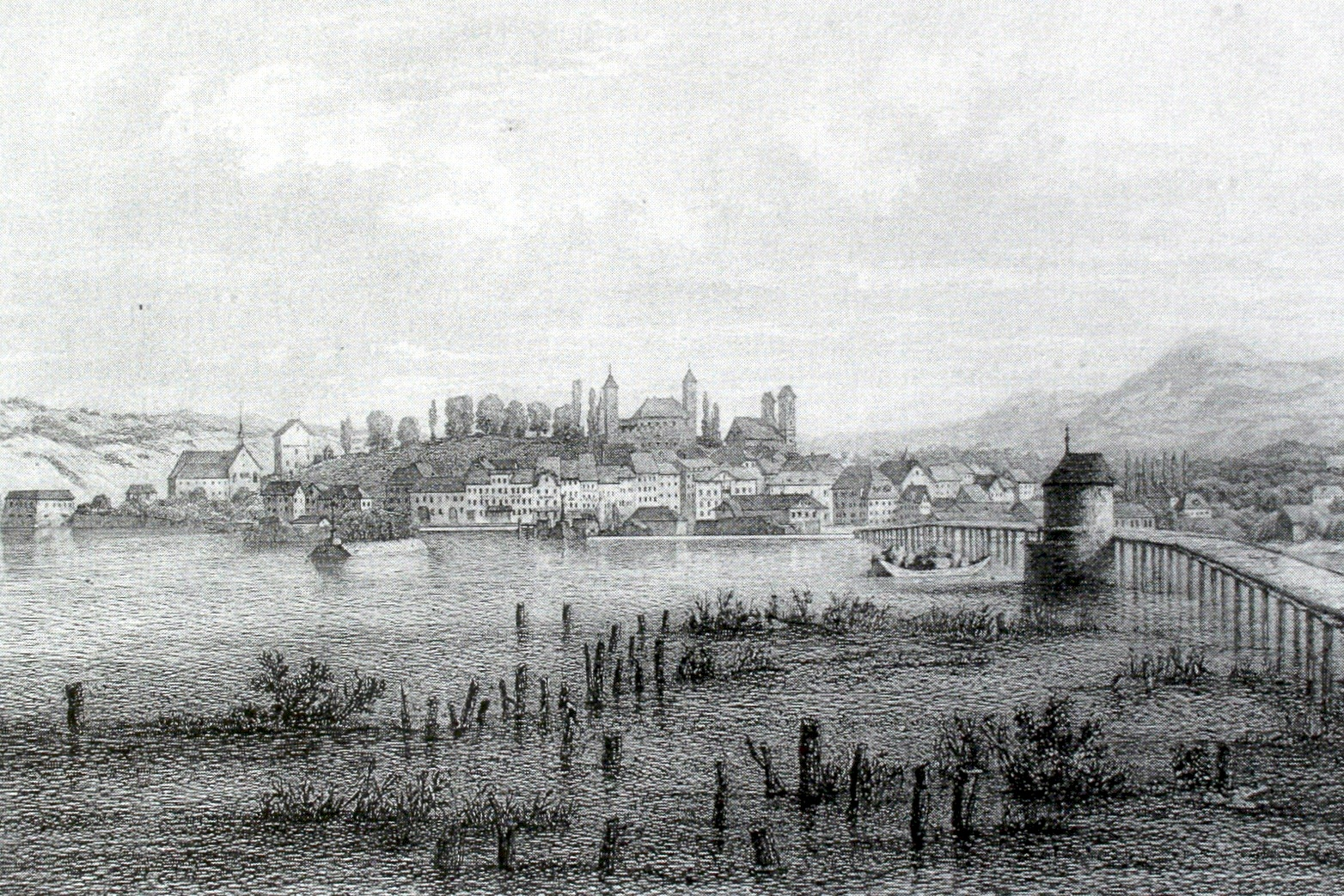
The wooden bridge and the Heilig Hüsli chapel on a steel engraving (1865), Rapperswil in the background

== The new bridge (2001) ==
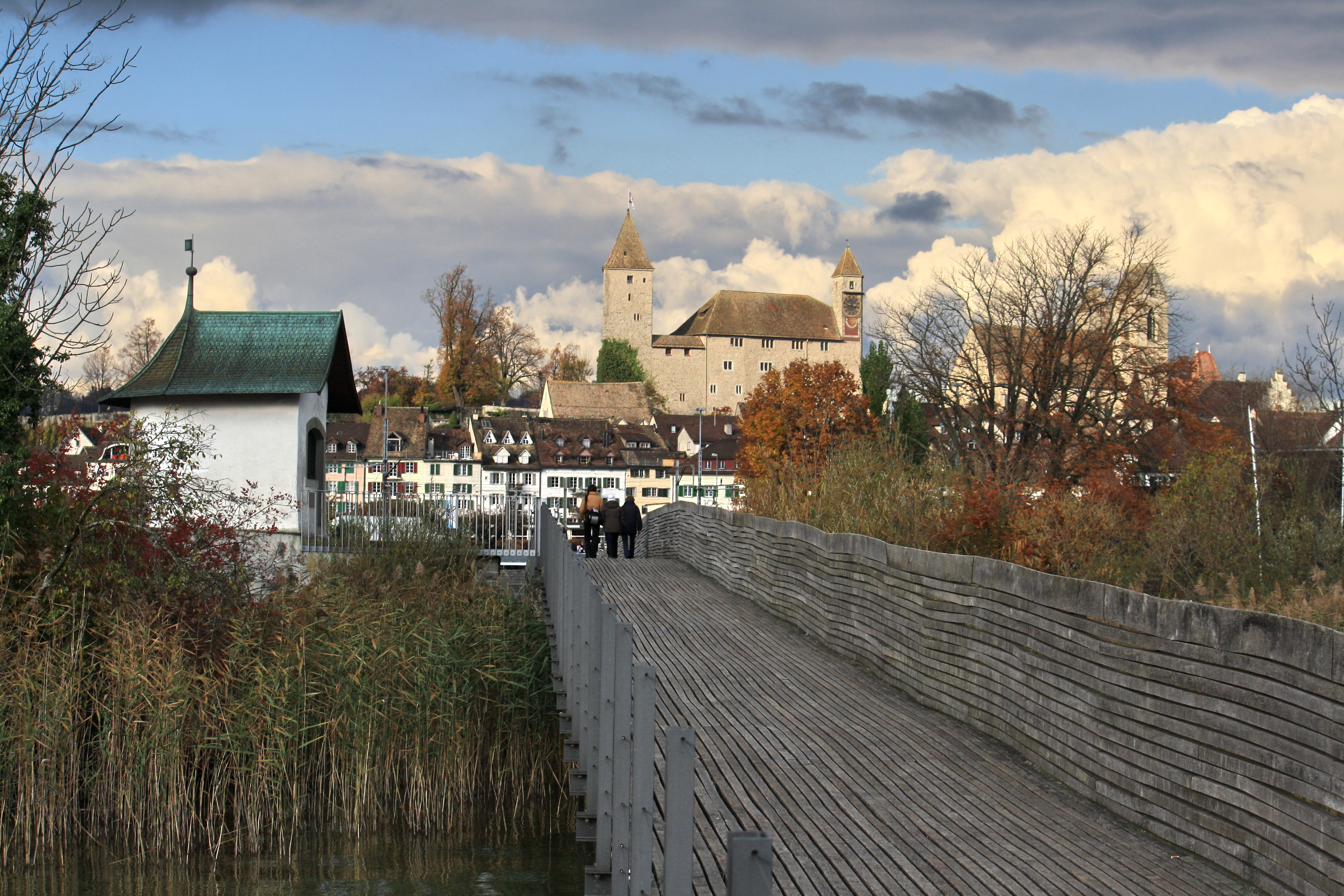
The wooden bridge and the bridge chapel Heilig Hüsli. Rapperswil and Rapperswil Castle in the background.

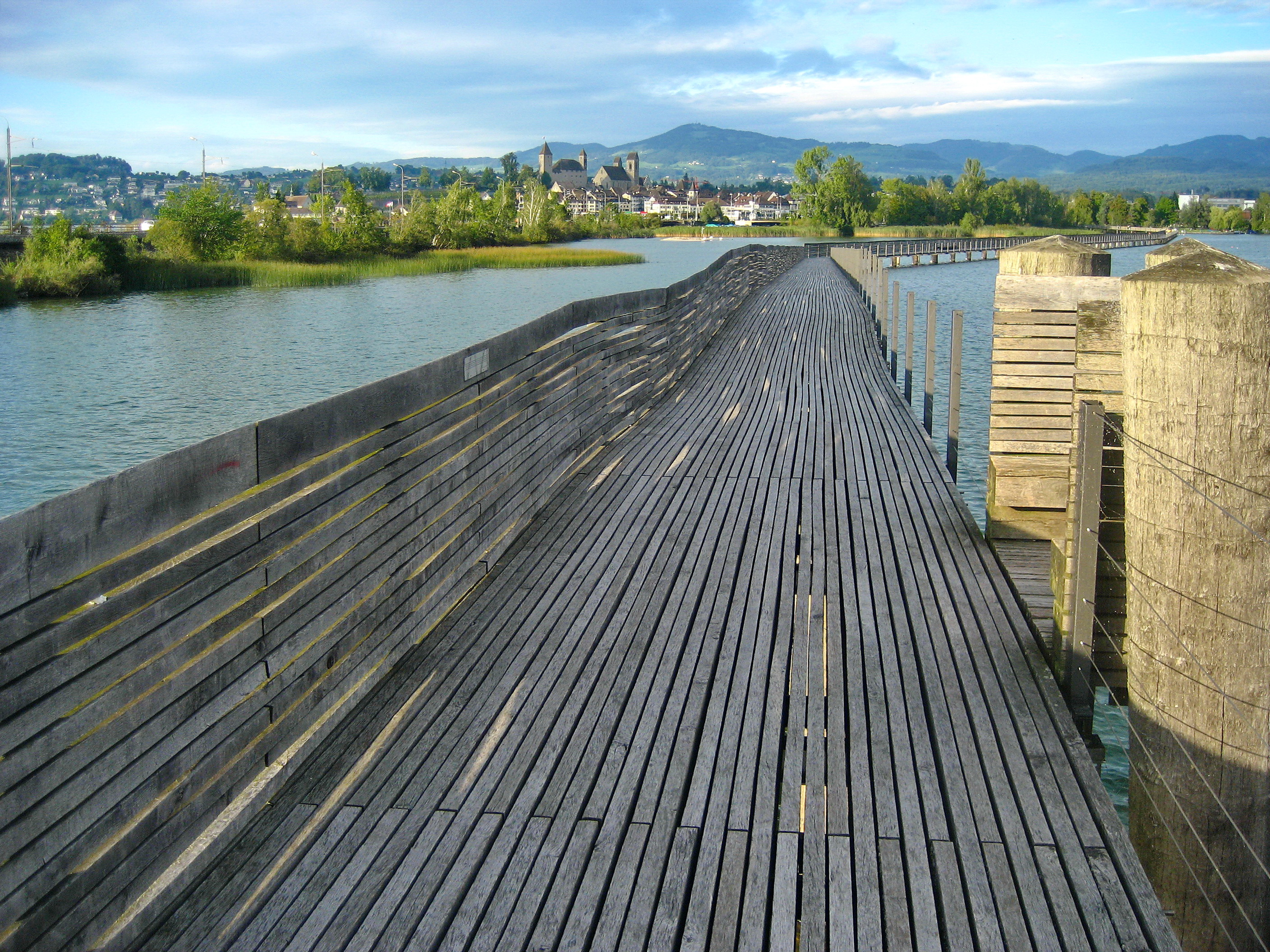
The bridge as seen from Hurden

On 6 April 2001 the latest wooden footbridge was opened alongside the Seedamm. Piling started on 9 August 2000. The bridge was built within nine months. Like the 1360–1878 bridge the new wooden bridge links Rapperswil with the bridge chapel Heilig Hüsli.

The bridge has a length of 841 metres (2,759 ft) and the footpath is 2.4 metres (7 ft 10 in) wide. The length of the 233 piles varies between 7 metres (23 ft) and 16 metres (52 ft), their diameter measuring between 36 centimetres (14 in) and 70 centimetres (28 in). 415 cubic metres (14,700 cu ft) of solid oak and 61 tonnes (60 long tons; 67 short tons) of steel components have been used.

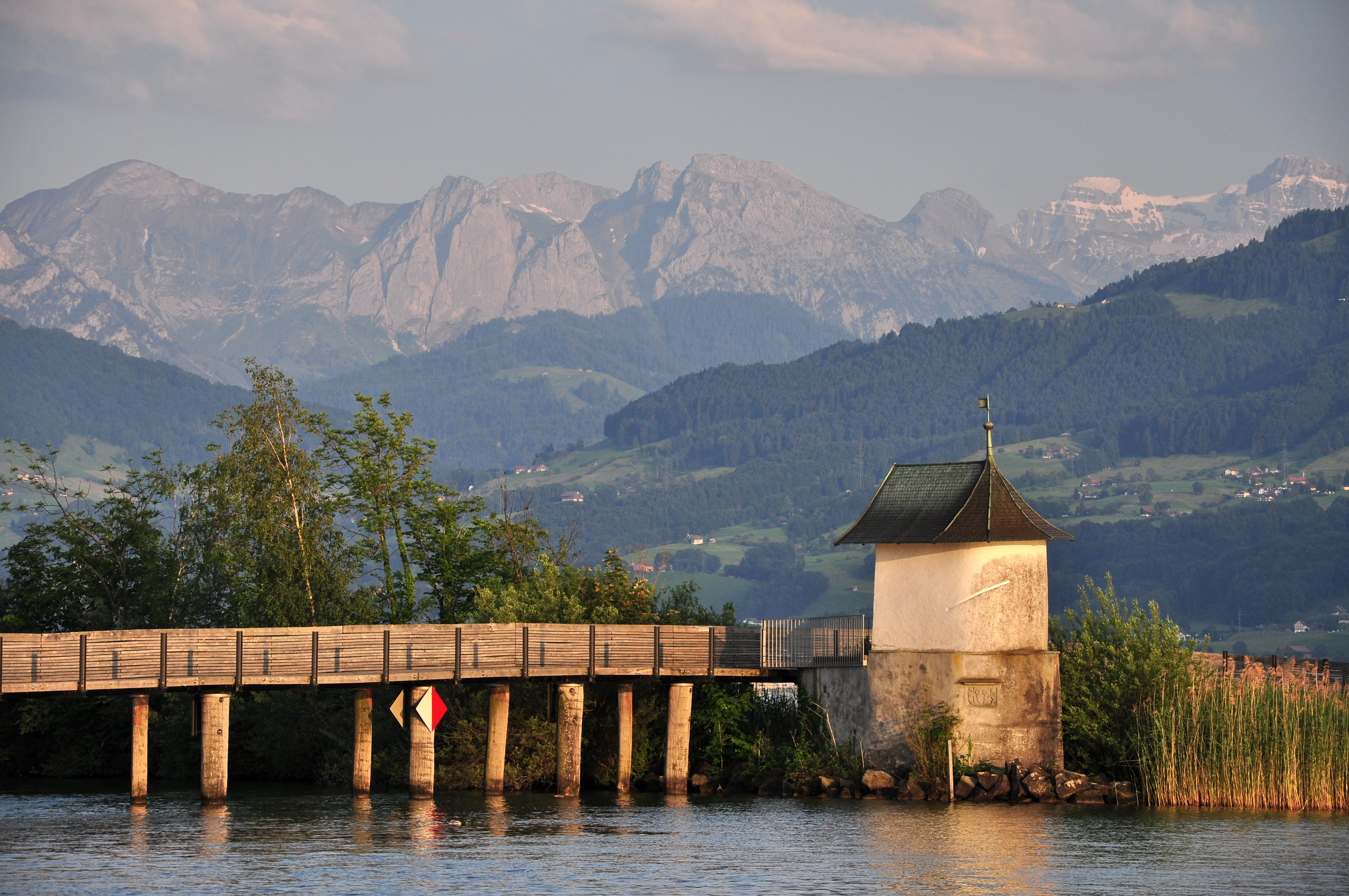
The wooden bridge and the bridge chapel as seen from the nearby Seedamm, Wägital in the background

== Nature reserve ==
The lake area near the Heilig Hüsli chapel and the small islands between the timber bridge and the dam are designated as a nature reserve. One of the small islands is an artificial gravel island. Hikers can observe a richly varied flora and fauna. The protected area is of the most important waterfowl breeding areas. For this reason, fishing from the wooden bridge is prohibited, as is swimming and mooring boats in the area.

== See also ==
- Prehistoric pile dwellings around Zürichsee

== Literature ==
- Beat Eberschweiler: Ur- und frühgeschichtliche Verkehrswege über den Zürichsee: Erste Ergebnisse aus den taucharchäologischen Untersuchungen beim Seedamm. In: Mitteilungen des Historischen Vereins des Kantons Schwyz, vol. 96, Schwyz 2004, p. 11–32 (online at e-periodica.ch).
- Hans Rathgeb: Brücken über den See. Hrsg. von der Arbeitsgemeinschaft Fussgänger-Holzsteg Rapperswil-Hurden, Rapperswil 2001. ISBN 3-9522511-1-9
