= Frauenwinkel =

Mire landscape in Switzerland

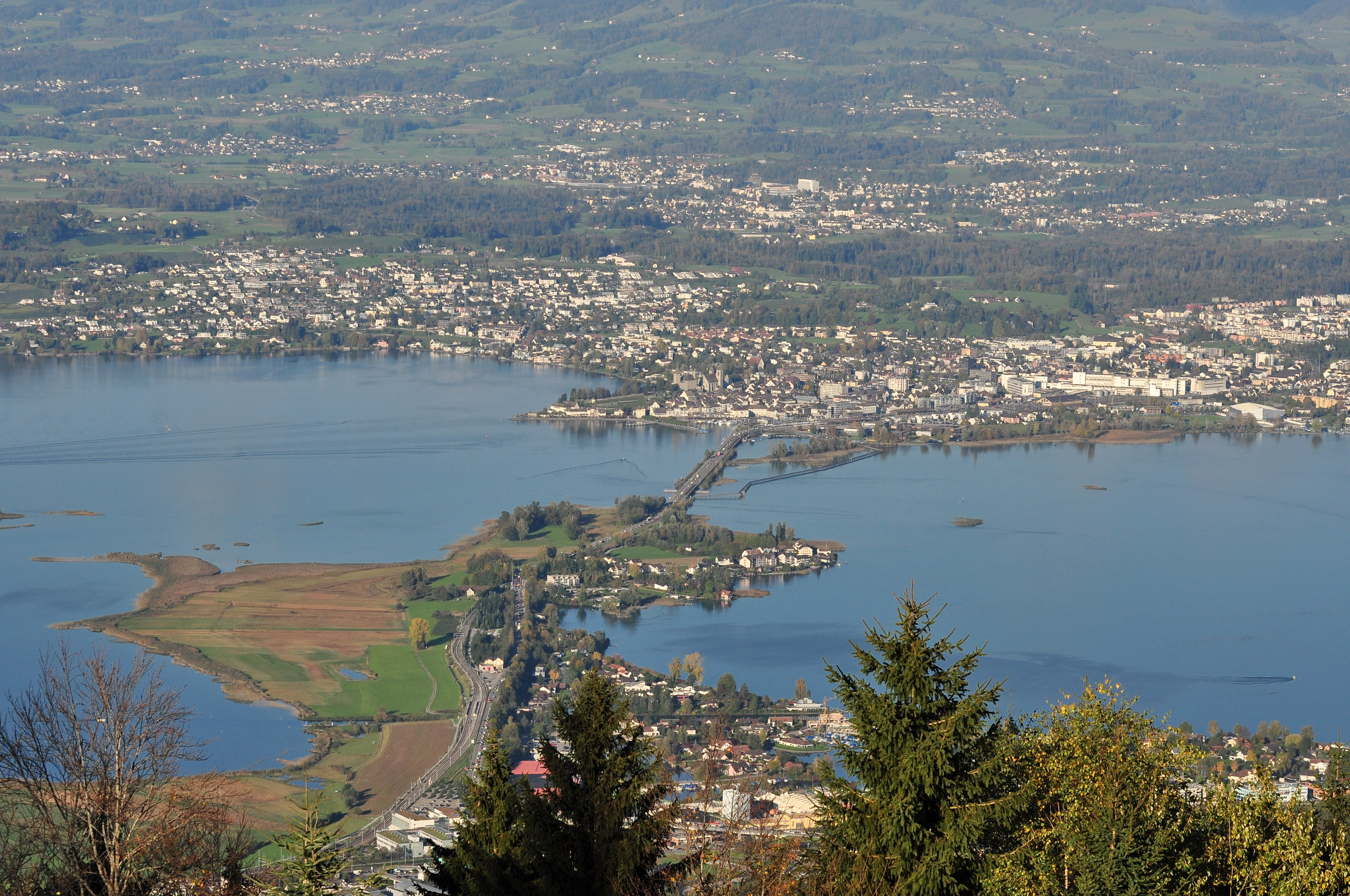
- Zürichsee and Obersee (upper Zürichsee) divided by the Seedamm area between Rapperswil and Hurden, Frauenwinkel wetland in the foreground

- Location within Switzerland
- Location: Seedamm, Freienbach, Canton of Schwyz
- Nearest city: Rapperswil
- Coordinates: 47°12′32.25″N 8°47′41.6″E
- Area: 350 ha (860 acres)
- Established: 1927
- Website: www.frauenwinkel.ch

Frauenwinkel is a mire landscape in Switzerland, situated at the Seedamm area on Zürichsee lakeshore in the municipality of Freienbach in the Canton of Schwyz.

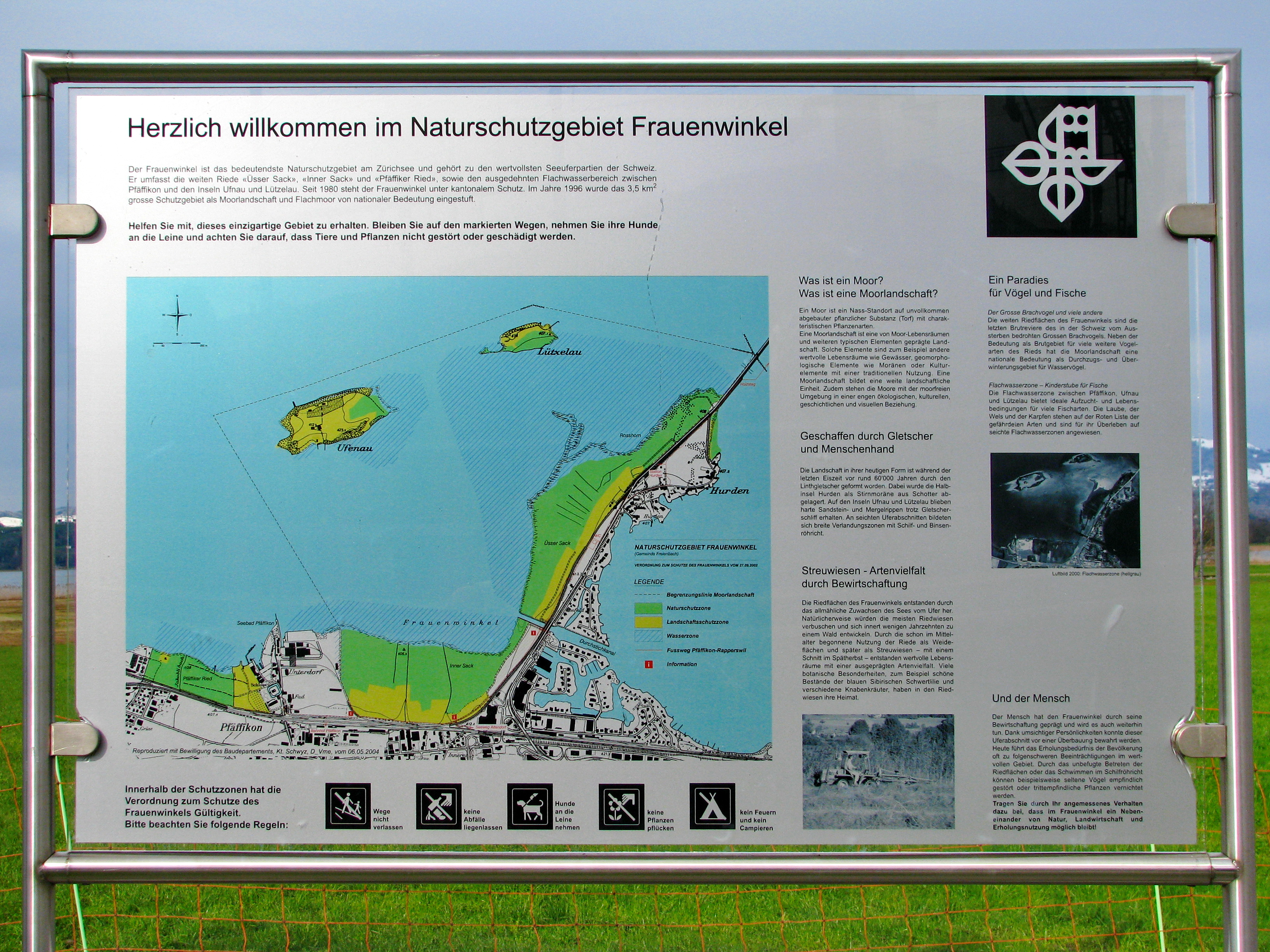
information board and map

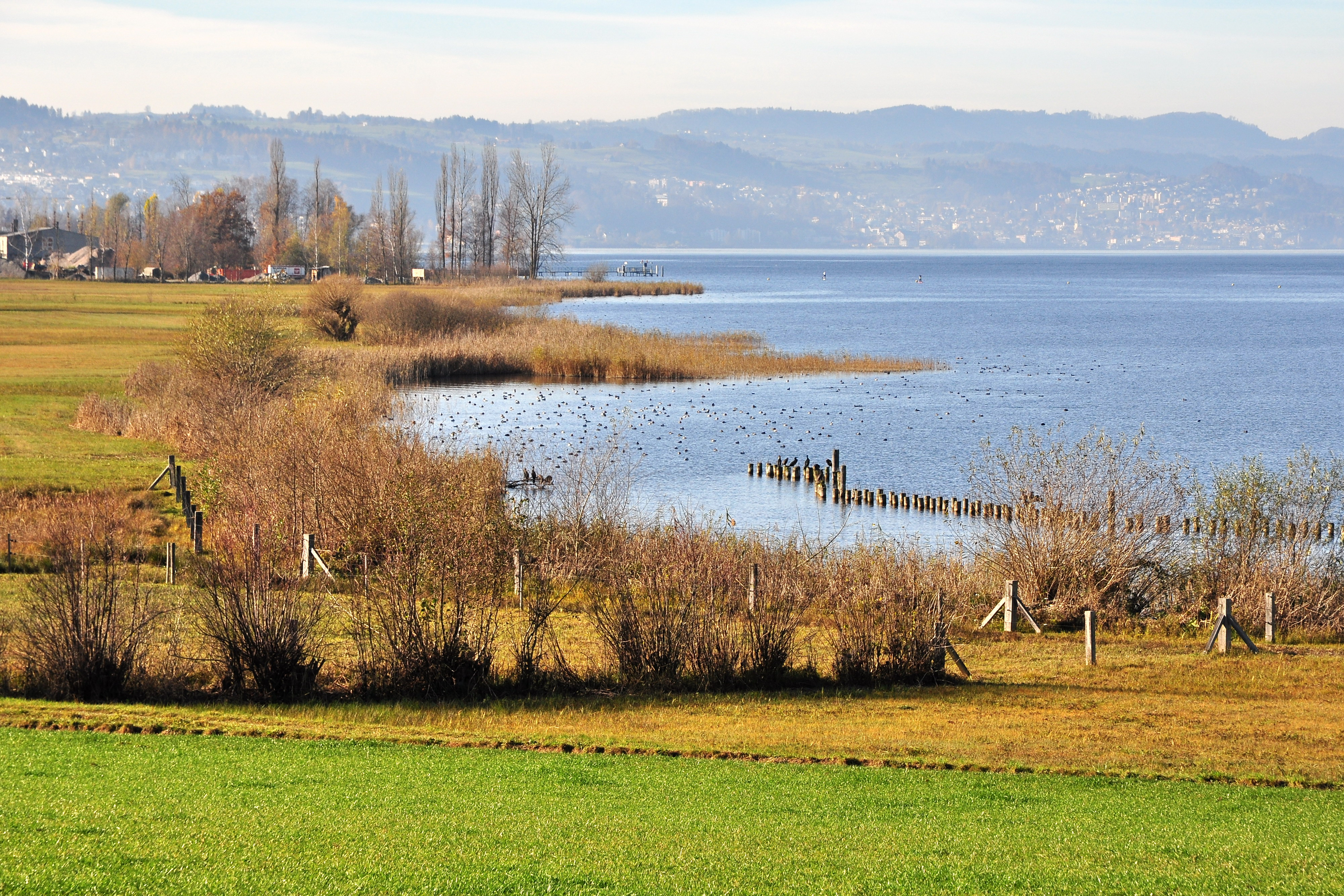
as seen towards Pfäffikon and Zimmerberg

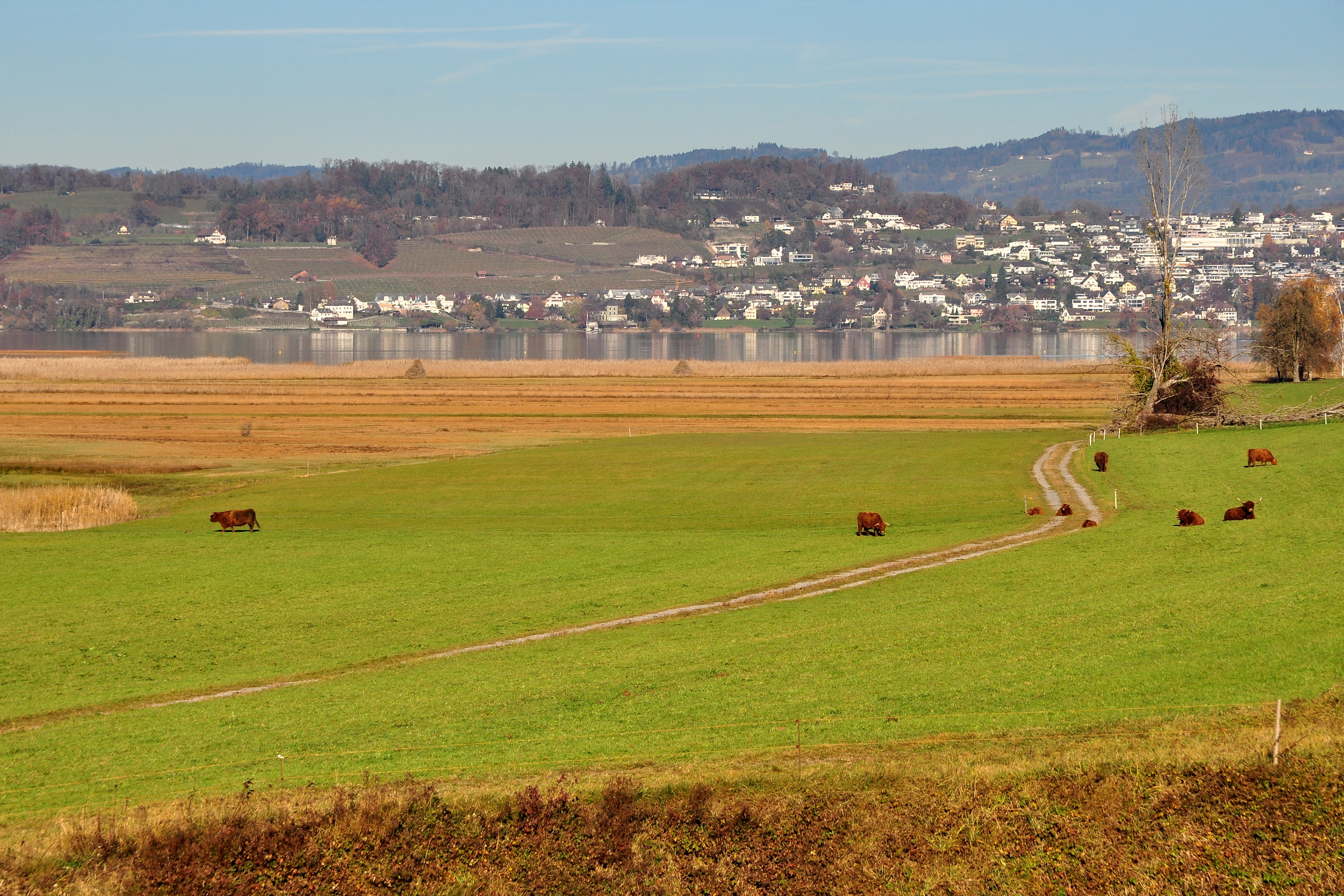
as see from Seedamm towards Kempraten

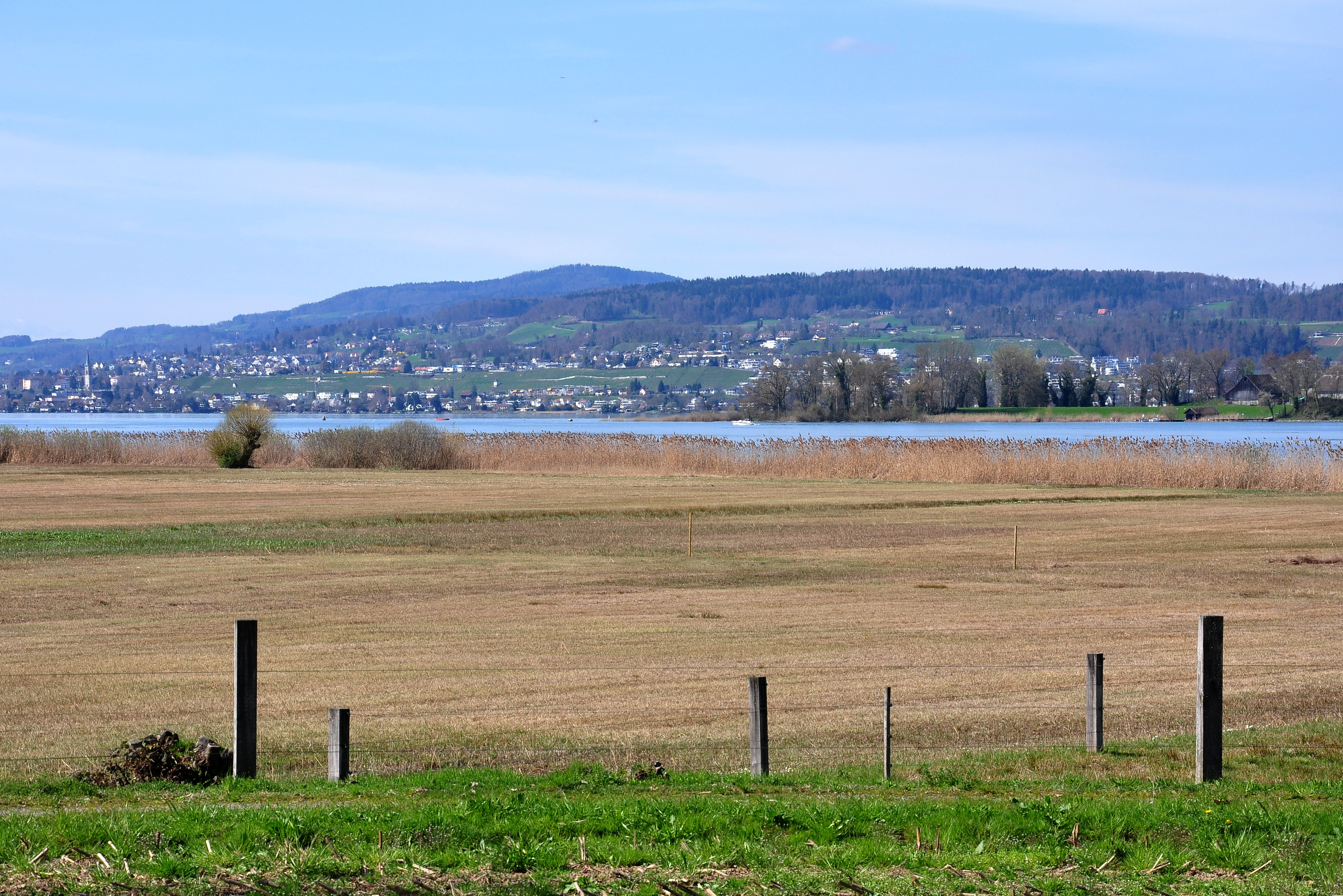
the wetlands towards Ufenau island and Pfannenstiel area

== Geography ==
Frauenwinkel is situated on the Seedamm area in Hurden, a locality of Freienbach in the canton of Schwyz. It is bordered by the Zürichsee to the west, by the locality of Pfäffikon to the south and by the Hurden canal to the north; to its east the Obersee (upper Lake Zurich) at Rapperswil is situated, as well as the Holzbrücke Rapperswil-Hurden being another protected area. The reed and marsh belt at Frauenwinkel has a maximal width of about 1 kilometre (0.6 mi) from the west to the east and a length of about 1.5 kilometres (0.9 mi) from the north to the south. The lake area of about 3.5 kilometres (2.2 mi) towards the Lützelau and Ufenau islands is also part of the Frauenwinkel protected area. At Hurden local agricultural use is allowed. The open landscape of Frauenwinkel is the last great unspoilt section of the shore on Zürichsee. Its shallow water areas are southernly and easterly surrounded by marshes and to the northwest by the islands of Ufenau and Lützelau.

The name Frauenwinkel origins from a donation in 965 AD by the emperor Otto I to the pin Unserer lieben Frau (Our Lady) to the Einsiedeln Abbey which still is the owner of the area.

== Flora and fauna ==
A reed belt lines the greater part of the shore between Pfäffikon and Hurden. Landward there is reed vegetation with large and small sedge flora, rushes, Iris sibirica and Gentiana pneumonanthe. In certain places even transition and high marsh occurs. Species found in the nature reserve include Phengaris alcon, Eurasian curlew and Gentiana pneumonanthe, as well as Ruspolia nitidula, a small snail.

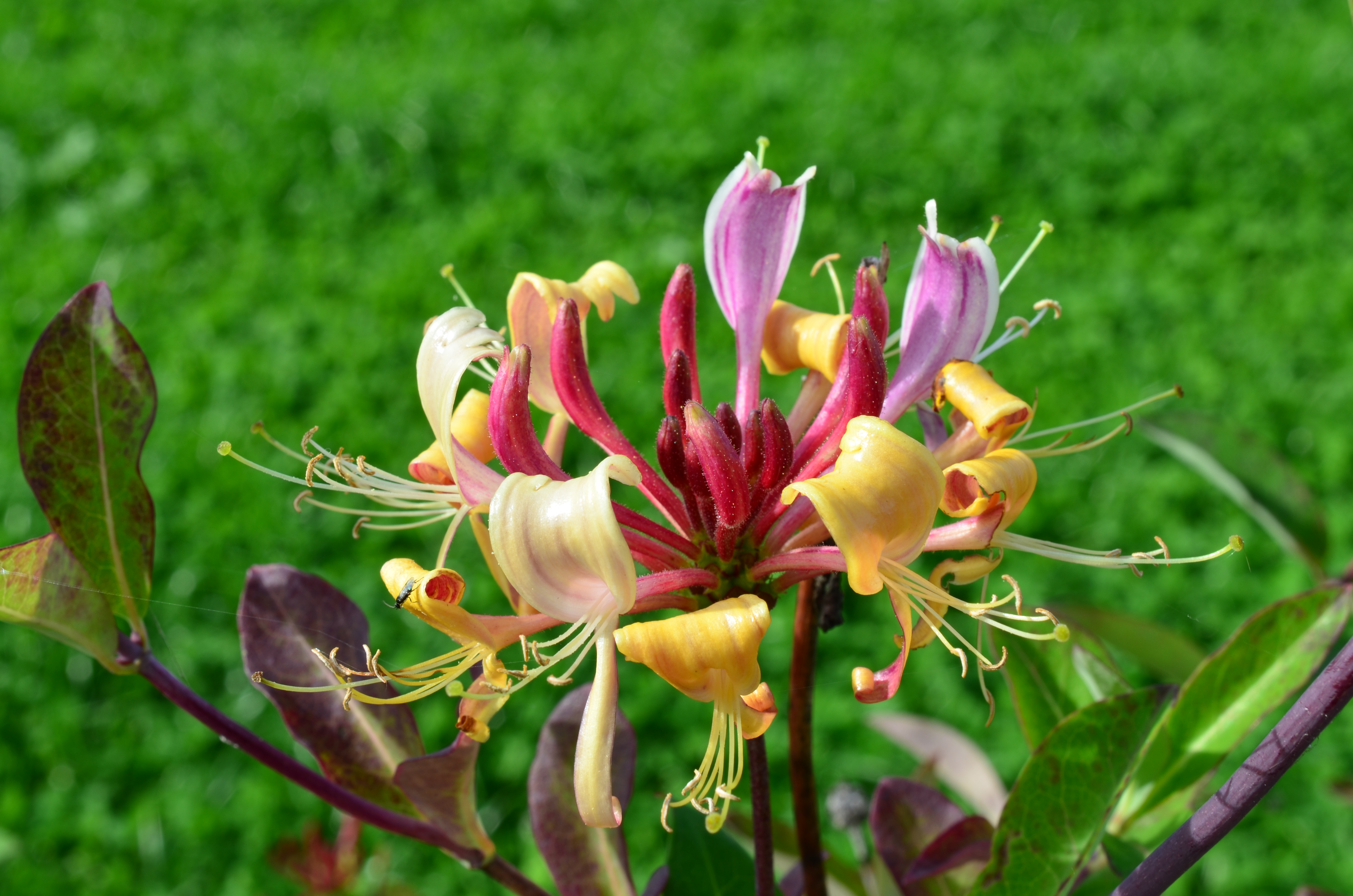
flora and ...

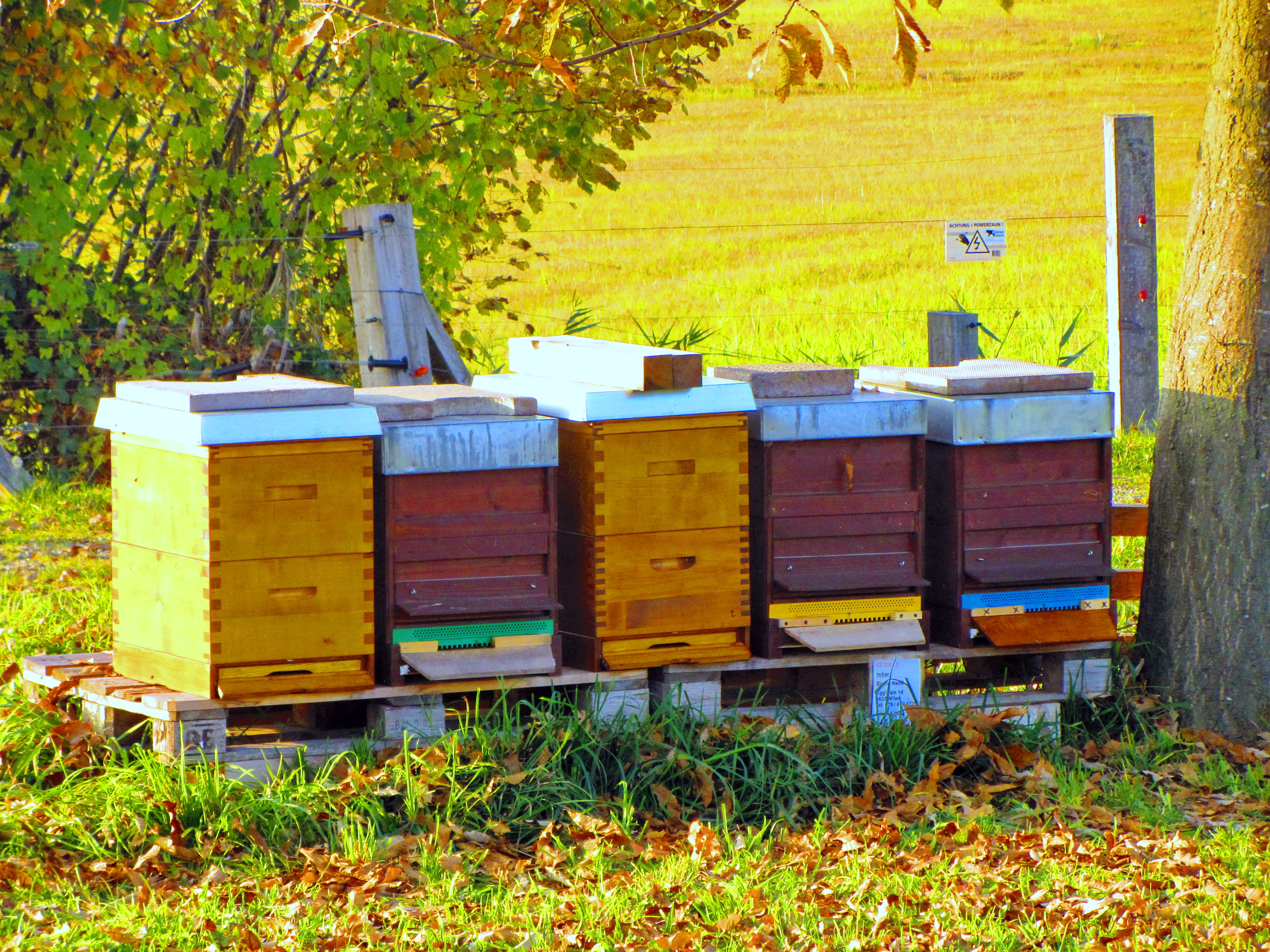
... fauna, local domesticated bees ...

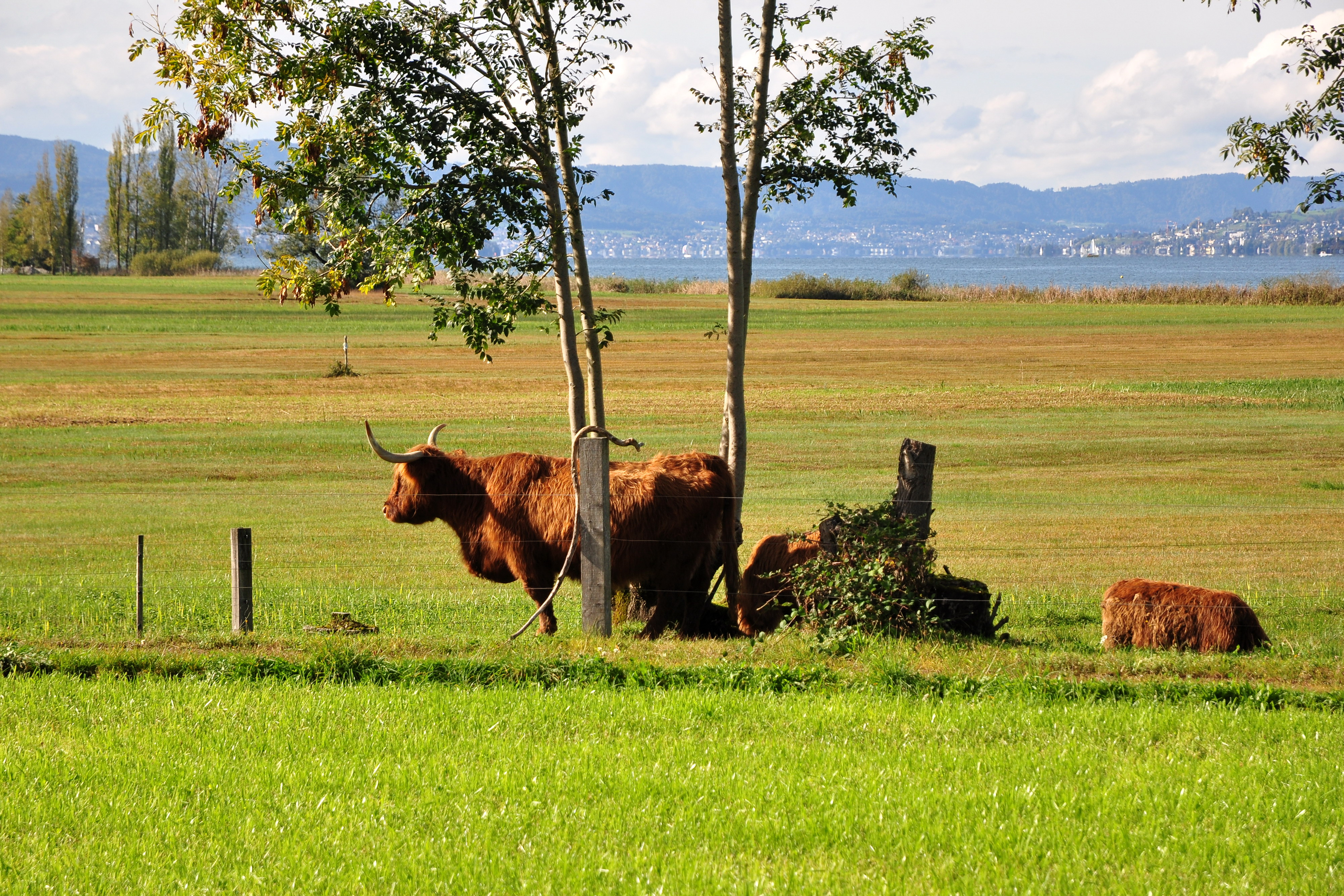
... and 'guests' from Scotland

=== Birds ===
Frauenwinkel is an important water bird roost and breeding grounds of various reed birds. The area is one of the last breeding places in Switzerland for curlews. On passage in late February and early March, up to 200-strong curlew flocks may be observed, as well as common reed bunting and great reed warbler.

=== Threats ===
Strong recovery pressure, nutrient input, excavated material from drainage ditches and (especially in this deep geographical location) the propagation of rampant foreign plants endanger the sensitive area. The splitting of the different areas within the larger habitat area is a threat to the birds living there. In recent decades, commercial and residential buildings, intensified agriculture and leisure claims have gradually reduced the area, a remnant of nature in the laundry room: this is the charm and the great danger.

In addition to the safeguarding of sites by own land acquisitions and the completion of contracts, the broad-based Frauenwinkel foundation, supported by the environmental organizations Ala, SKV, WWF, ZSL and Pro Natura Schwyz, the municipality Freienbach, farmers and industry forces the protection and enhancement of the area by public relation works. In co-operation with the cantonal office of the nature reserve (German: Fachstelle Naturschutz des Kantons Schwyz) the protection status may be optimized.

== Legal protection ==
Frauenwinkel is the most important nature reserve on the Zürichsee lakeshore. Established in 1927 and protected in 1980 respectively 1996, the Frauenwinkel bog landscape and lake zone including the Lützelau and Ufenau islands belong to Switzerland's most valuable riparian landscapes. Frauenwinkel ist part of the mire landscapes in Switzerland, bogs and wetlands being in the Inventory of Mire Landscapes of Particular Beauty and National Importance in Switzerland. The area is a moorland and fen site of national importance, according to the Cantonal Protection Ordinance (German: Moorlandschaft und Flachmoorobjekte von nationaler Bedeutung, Kantonale Schutzverordnung).

The protected site is also part of the archaeological Seedamm area including the remains of the Prehistoric wooden bridges respectively Prehistoric pile dwellings around Zürichsee settlements, situated at the Seedamm isthmus between the Zürichsee and the Obersee lake area: Freienbach–Hurden Rosshorn, Freienbach–Hurden Seefeld, Seegubel and Rapperswil-Jona–Technikum. Because the lake has grown in size over time, the original piles are now around 4 metres (13 ft) to 7 metres (23 ft) under the water level of 406 metres (1,332 ft). As well as being part of the 56 Swiss sites of the UNESCO World Heritage Site Prehistoric pile dwellings around the Alps, the settlements are also listed in the Swiss inventory of cultural property of national and regional significance as a Class object.

== Literature ==
- Pfahlbaufieber. Von Antiquaren, Pfahlbaufischern, Altertümerhändlern und Pfahlbaumythen. Mitteilungen der Antiquarischen Gesellschaft in Zürich, volume 71. Chronos, Zurich 2004, ISBN 978-3-0340-0672-9.
