= Freienbach–Hurden Seefeld =

Hurden Seefeld
UNESCO World Heritage Site
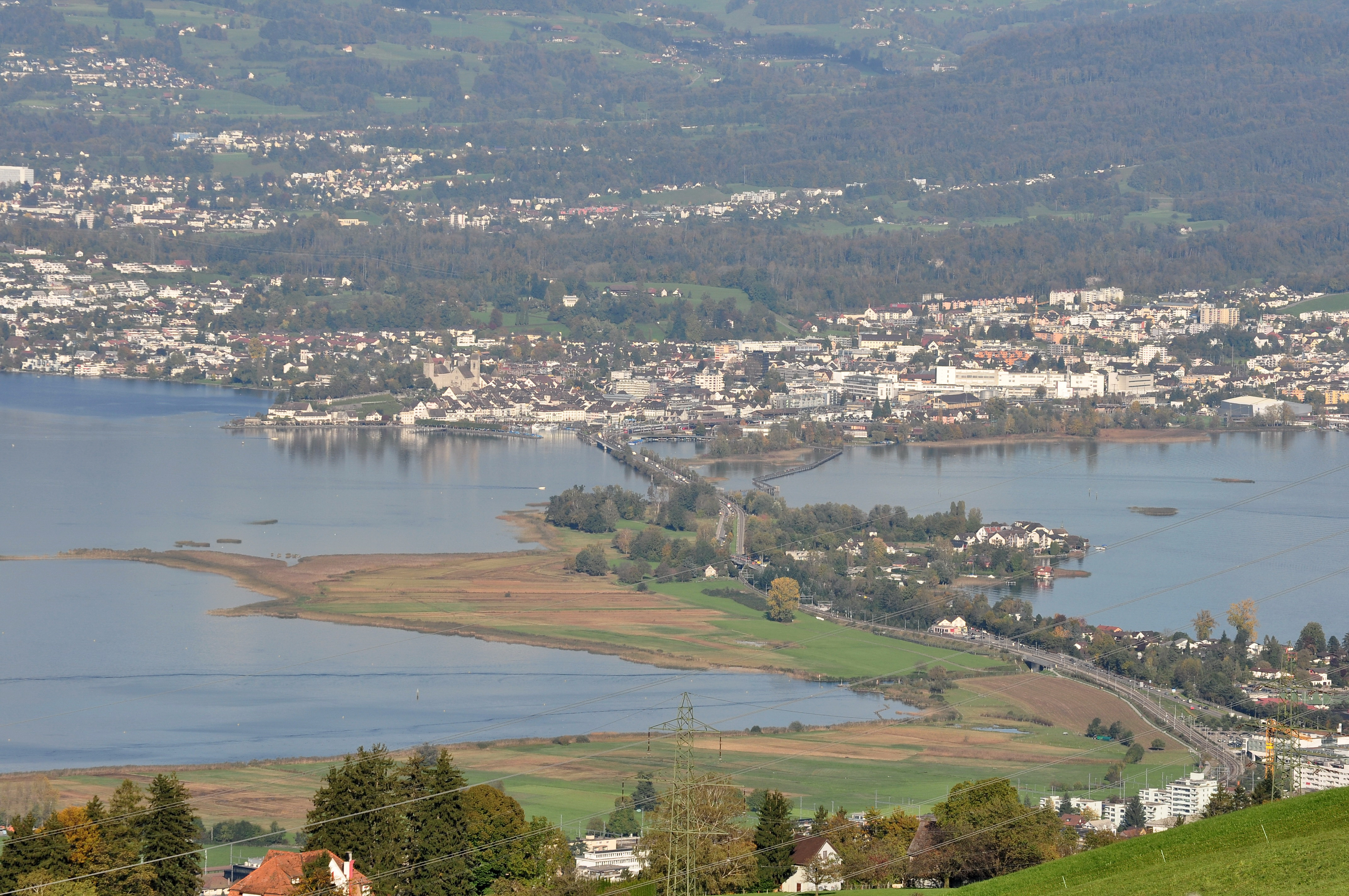
- The site of the prehistoric settlement

- Location within Canton of Schwyz Location within Switzerland
- Location: Hurden, Freienbach, Canton of Schwyz, Switzerland
- Part of: Prehistoric Pile Dwellings around the Alps
- Criteria: Cultural: (iv), (v)
- Reference: 1363-028
- Inscription: 2011 (35th Session)
- Area: 2.4 ha (5.9 acres)
- Buffer zone: 16.12 ha (39.8 acres)
- Website: www.palafittes.org/en/index.html
- Coordinates: 47°12′43.06″N 8°48′8.22″E

Freienbach–Hurden Seefeld is one of the 111 serial sites of the UNESCO World Heritage Site Prehistoric pile dwellings around the Alps, of which are 56 located in Switzerland.

== Geography ==
Hurden-Seefeld is located at the Frauenwinkel area on Zürichsee lakeshore in Hurden, a locality of the municipality of Freienbach in the Canton of Schwyz in Switzerland. Situated at the Seedamm, an isthmus between the Zürichsee and the Obersee lake area, it was in close vicinity to the prehistoric lake crossings, neighboured by three other Prehistoric pile dwelling settlements: Freienbach–Hurden Rosshorn, Rapperswil-Jona/Hombrechtikon–Feldbach and Rapperswil-Jona–Technikum. Because the lake has grown in size over time, the original piles are now around 4 metres (13 ft) to 7 metres (23 ft) under the water level of 406 metres (1,332 ft). The settlement comprises 2.4 hectares (5.93 acres), and the buffer zone including the lake area comprises 16.14 hectares (39.88 acres) in all.

== Description ==
The early Corded ware culture in one of several settlement phases provide dates which are of particular scientific interest in terms of the emergence and dissemination in Switzerland. The layers are extraordinarily well preserved and hold valuable reserves of research material. Extending over 300 metres (984 ft) to 400 metres (1,312 ft) metres, the settlement is also of great interest due to its function and internal organization on this important transport route crossing the lake.

== Protection ==
As well as being part of the 56 Swiss sites of the UNESCO World Heritage Site Prehistoric pile dwellings around the Alps, the settlement is also listed in the Swiss inventory of cultural property of national and regional significance as a Class A object of national importance. Hence, the area is provided as a historical site under federal protection, within the meaning of the Swiss Federal Act on the nature and cultural heritage (German: Bundesgesetz über den Natur- und Heimatschutz NHG) of 1 July 1966. Unauthorised researching and purposeful gathering of findings represent a criminal offense according to Art. 24.

== See also ==
- Prehistoric pile dwellings around Zürichsee

== Literature ==
- Peter J. Suter, Helmut Schlichtherle et al.: Pfahlbauten – Palafittes – Palafitte. Palafittes, Biel 2009. ISBN 978-3-906140-84-1.
- Beat Eberschweiler: Ur- und frühgeschichtliche Verkehrswege über den Zürichsee: Erste Ergebnisse aus den Taucharchäologischen Untersuchungen beim Seedamm. In: Mitteilungen des Historischen Vereins des Kantons Schwyz, Volume 96, Schwyz 2004.
