= Prehistoric pile dwellings around Lake Zurich =

UNESCO World Heritage Site
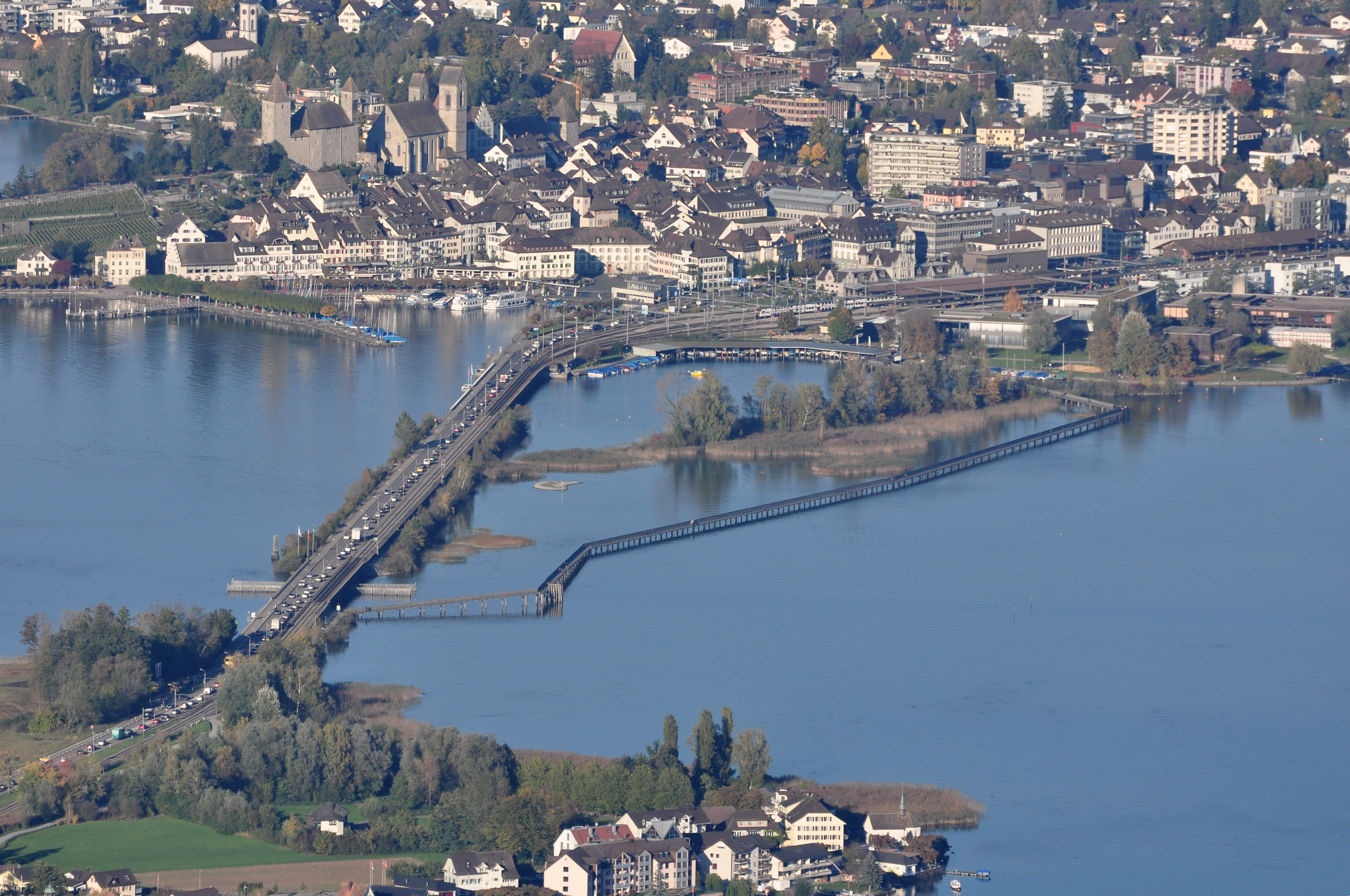
- Seedamm and reconstruction of the medieval lake bridge at Rapperswil, Lake Zurich to the left, Obersee to the right, Hurden in the foreground; the area of three pile dwellings and the Neolithic lake crossing.
- Location: Cantons of Schwyz, St. Gallen and Zurich in Switzerland
- Part of: Prehistoric Pile Dwellings around the Alps
- Includes: Hurden Rosshorn; Hurden Seefeld; Feldbach; Technikum; Winkel; Storen-Wildsberg; Rorenhaab; Vorder Au; Robenhausen; Alpenquai; Kleiner Hafner
- Criteria: Cultural: (iv), (v)
- Reference: 1363
- Inscription: 2011 (35th Session)
- Website: www.palafittes.org

Prehistoric pile dwellings around Lake Zurich are pile dwelling sites located around Lake Zurich in the cantons of Schwyz, St. Gallen and Zurich.

The article focuses on the nine Lake Zurich sites that are among the 111 sites included in the UNESCO World Heritage Prehistoric pile dwellings around the Alps established in 2011. Fifty-six of the 111 UNESCO World Heritage pile dwelling sites are located in Switzerland and nine thereof are located on the Lake Zurich seashore. The article also includes one UNESCO World Heritage site at the nearby Greifensee and one UNESCO World Heritage site at the Pfäffikersee.

The 11 sites described here are only a selection, just like the 111 UNESCO World Heritage sites are only a selection of more than 900 known sites of prehistoric pile dwellings in the Alpine region.

== Geography ==
The 11 prehistoric pile-dwelling (or stilt house) sites are concentrated within an area of about 40 square kilometres (15 sq mi), on Lake Zurich, specifically Obersee lakeshore in the cantons of Schwyz, St. Gallen and Zurich.

== Characteristics ==
The pile-dwelling sites were built from around 5000 BC to 500 BC. Contrary to popular belief, the settlements were not erected over water, but on nearby marshy land, among them on the Seedamm respectively Frauenwinkel area, or, on the then swamp land between the Limmat and Lake Zurich around Sechseläutenplatz on small islands and peninsulas in Zurich. The settlements were set on piles to protect against occasional flooding by the Linth and Jona. Because the lake has grown in size over time, most of the original piles are now around 4 metres (13 ft) to 7 metres (23 ft) under the water level of 406 metres (1,332 ft), giving modern observers the false impression that they always had been surrounded by water.

Most of the settlements were inhabited for some decades and then re-erected at a quite different location. A notable exception is the settlement Robenhausen at the Pfäffikersee, discovered and researched by Jakob Messikommer at the end of the 19th century, which was continuously inhabited for thousands of years.

Archaeological excavations were conducted in only some of the sites in order to preserve the heritage for future generations. Nevertheless, the excavations yielded evidence that provides insight into life in prehistoric times during the Neolithic and Bronze Age in Alpine Europe and the way communities interacted with their environment. The settlements are a unique group of exceptionally well-preserved and culturally rich archaeological sites, which constitute one of the most important sources for the study of early agrarian societies.

== Sites ==
Sources, among them area, date and location as well as coordinates and ID, used in the table base on Prehistoric pile dwellings around the Alps, and are listed as references. The list bases on the dates of December 2014.

=== Lake Zurich ===
Excavations of the "Pan-European stilt house settlements" began at Lake Zurich in Switzerland. During the winter of 1853–54, in the context of lowered water levels at Lake Zurich, archaeologist Ferdinand Keller discovered the remains of the Meilen–Rorenhaab site. Probably the majority of the important sites of the so-called Horgen culture are situated on lakeshore, including Grosser Hafner on a former lake island and Kleiner Hafner on a peninsula at Sechseläutenplatz respectively at the effluence of the Limmat, and Zurich–Enge Alpenquai within an area of about 0.2 hectares (0.49 acres) in the city of Zurich.

Freienbach–Hurden Rosshorn is a unique site because it was not a dwelling site but the site of prehistoric lake crossings between Hurden and Rapperswil (today's main lake crossing in this area is the Rapperswil Seedamm). The dwelling sites Hurden Seefeld and Technikum are closely associated with these prehistoric lake crossings; the Feldbach site is also not far away.

==== Sites with World Heritage status ====
The following nine Lake Zurich sites are among the 111 sites included in the UNESCO World Heritage Prehistoric pile dwellings around the Alps.

Native name	Description	Location	Canton	Coordinates	Size (ha)	Buffer (ha)	Serial ID	Approx. occupied (BC)	Image
Freienbach–Hurden Rosshorn	Freienbach–Hurden Rosshorn provides early evidence of transport routes combined with special metal finds interpreted as sacrificial offerings. The site includes several lake crossings beginning in the Horgen culture. Several Early Bronze Age construction phases have been identified, as well as remains from the Hallstatt culture and Roman era providing dendrochronological dates about periods from which no other sites are known.	Hurden	Schwyz	47°13′10.38″N 8°48′24.6″E	4.32	20.10	1363-027; CH-SZ-01	3500–3000; 2000–500	
Freienbach–Hurden Seefeld	The early Corded ware culture in one of several settlement phases provided dates which is of particular scientific interest in terms of the emergence and dissemination in Switzerland. The layers are extraordinarily well preserved and hold valuable reserves of research material. Extending over 300 metres (984 ft) to 400 metres (1,312 ft) metres, the settlement is also of great interest due to its function and internal organization on this important transport route crossing the lake.	Hurden	Schwyz	47°12′43.05″N 8°48′8.22″E	2.40	16.12	1363-028; CH-SZ-02	3500–2500	
Rapperswil-Jona/Hombrechtikon–Feldbach	Distinctive house plans and a cultural layer dating from the middle phase of the Corded Ware period, is of particular importance in that multi-phase settlement. The evidence of a settlement from the transitional phase between the Early and Middle Bronze Ages, is another interesting aspect of the site, yielded a date of 1490 BC, which is very late within the Early Bronze Age pile-dwelling period. The dates refer to the same period as the transport routes across the lake from Hurden-Rosshorn to Rapperswil (CH-SZ-01). and slightly post-date the neighbouring site Rapperswil-Jona–Technikum (CH-SG-02).	Hombrechtikon–Kempraten	Zurich	47°14′19.66″N 8°47′45.96″E	7.50	15.50	1363-031; CH-SG-01	4000–1000	
Rapperswil-Jona–Technikum	Multiple palisades and a clear visible settlement structure located on a former island, characterise the Early Bronze Age site dated in the 17th century BC. It points to the same period as the early footbridges across the Seedamm between Rapperswil and Hurden-Rosshorn (CH-SZ-01). The settlement was certainly of great importance as the centre of the region, and it may even have played a role in controlling this important transport route.	Rapperswil	St. Gallen	47°13′14.21″N 8°48′56.55″E	0.92	49.10	1363-032; CH-SZ-02	2000–1500	
Erlenbach–Winkel	From the Early Bronze Age (20th/19th centuries BC) are numerous finds and ground plans of Corded Ware houses of particular interest. The latter are associated with material from the final phase of the Corded Ware Culture marking a hiatus of 600 years in the period of constructing pile dwellings north of the Alps until the Early Bronze Age. In a European context, the house constructions are of particular interest, because the Corded Ware Culture is defined mainly by its grave finds, whereas settlements are usually missing from the archaeological record.	Erlenbach	Zurich	47°17′49.91″N 8°35′46.31″E	3.01	6.60	1363-050; CH-ZH-01	4000–1500; 1000–500	
Meilen–Rorenhaab	As mentioned, this site was the starting point of pile-dwelling research and therefore interesting from the point of view of research history. It is one of several sites in a small area illustrating the typical settlement dynamics of a micro-region during the Neolithic. All periods are represented here, usually with several settlement phases, but particularly from the Early Bronze Age interesting are numerous dendrochronological dates, which allow to study the development of this period.	Meilen	Zurich	47°15′50.14″N 8°39′36.82″E	0.70	4.80	1363-052; CH-ZH-06	4000–2500; 2000–1500; 1000–500	
Wädenswil–Vorder Au	Located on the Au Peninsula, the site has yielded special pottery from the transitional period between the Pfyn and Horgen Cultures. The Corded Ware settlement phase contained a bell beaker, which allowed to draw conclusions on the links between the Corded Ware and Bell Beaker Cultures. Since it has yielded a special type of pottery, the Early Bronze Age settlement phase is also important, and helps trace the distribution of Arbon style pottery in the region during the 17th century BC.	Au-Wädenswil	Zurich	47°14′48.88″N 8°39′11.64″E	1.49	22.50	1363-053; CH-ZH-07	3500–1500	
Zurich–Enge Alpenquai	Alpenquai in the city of Zurich is one of the most important Late Bronze Age lakeside settlements in Central Europe: its huge size and its almost uninterrupted occupation from 1050 BC to 800 BC, rich imports and the excellent state of preservation of the layers with unique organic finds and architectural elements mark it as a cultural heritage site of worldwide importance. In addition, the final phase dates from the transition to the Iron Age, a period otherwise rarely found.	Zurich-Enge	Zurich	47°21′52.06″N 8°32′19.47″E	2.93	17.40	1363-055; CH-ZH-09	1500–500	
Zurich–Kleiner Hafner	Once a former island or peninsula at the estuary of Lake Zurich lakeshore and the Limmat, the settlement Kleiner Hafner represents all periods of pile dwelling. There are finds from the Neolithic Egolzwil, Cortaillod and Horgen cultures forming an important reference assemblage which allows to study the cultural development during the late 5th and early 4th millennia BC.	Zurich	Zurich	47°21′58.19″N 8°32′38.66″E	0.64	16.56	1363-056; CH-ZH-10	5000–1500; 1000–500	

==== Sites without World Heritage status ====
Examples include:

- Grosser Hafner

=== Greifensee ===
The Greifensee is located at a distance of appromimately 7km to the northeast of Lake Zurich.

Native name	Description	Location	Canton	Coordinates	Size (ha)	Buffer (ha)	Serial ID	Approx. occupied (BC)	Image
Greifensee–Storen/Wildsberg	Characterized is that settlement by a large settlement area on a very steep slope on Greifensee lakeshore. From a scientific point of view and besides the location, a particularly interesting aspect is a phase of occupation dating from the Late Horgen culture. Furthermore, a copper spiral coil and a copper dagger from the Pfyn culture bear early witness to the processing of metal in this region. The settlement is largely undisturbed and thus holds great scientific potential for future research.	Greifensee	Zurich	47°21′37.8″N 8°40′51.51″E	9.59	11.70	1363-051; CH-ZH-02	4000–2500	

=== Pfäffikersee ===
The Pfäffikersee is located at a distance of appromimately 6km to the east of the Greifensee.

Native name	Description	Location	Canton	Coordinates	Size (ha)	Buffer (ha)	Serial ID	Approx. occupied (BC)	Image
Wetzikon–Robenhausen	Robenhausen in the spacious area is characterized by the excellent preservation of organic remains, and the site is known for its evidence of textile production. It has yielded numerous excellently preserved organic finds assemblages, mainly of textiles as well as parts of a Neolithic loom. An unusual find was a board, which was probably a Pfyn-period door.	Wetzikon	Zurich	47°20′9.05″N 8°47′8.16″E	0.92	155.00	1363-054; CH-ZH-08	4000–2500; 2000–1500; 1000–500	

== Protection ==
As well as being part of the 56 Swiss sites of the UNESCO World Heritage Site, each of these 11 prehistoric sites is also listed in the Swiss inventory of cultural property of national and regional significance as a Class A object of national importance.

Hence, the area of each settlement is provided as a historical site under federal protection, within the meaning of the Swiss Federal Act on the nature and cultural heritage (German: Bundesgesetz über den Natur- und Heimatschutz NHG) of 1 July 1966. Unauthorised researching and purposeful gathering of findings represent a criminal offense according to Art. 24.

== See also ==
- Prehistoric pile dwellings around the Alps
- Lakeside Dwelling, a 1878 painting depicting a family of Prehistoric pile dwellers in Switzerland.

== Bibliography ==
- Peter J. Suter, Helmut Schlichtherle et al.: Pfahlbauten – Palafittes – Palafitte. Palafittes, Biel 2009. ISBN 978-3-906140-84-1.
- Beat Eberschweiler: Ur- und frühgeschichtliche Verkehrswege über den Zürichsee: Erste Ergebnisse aus den Taucharchäologischen Untersuchungen beim Seedamm. In: Mitteilungen des Historischen Vereins des Kantons Schwyz, Volume 96, Schwyz 2004.
