= Mobility Pricing =

Traffic congestion pricing system in Switzerland

Mobility Pricing is a planned traffic congestion pricing system in Switzerland which was announced by Doris Leuthard, the Swiss transport minister, on 30 June 2016.

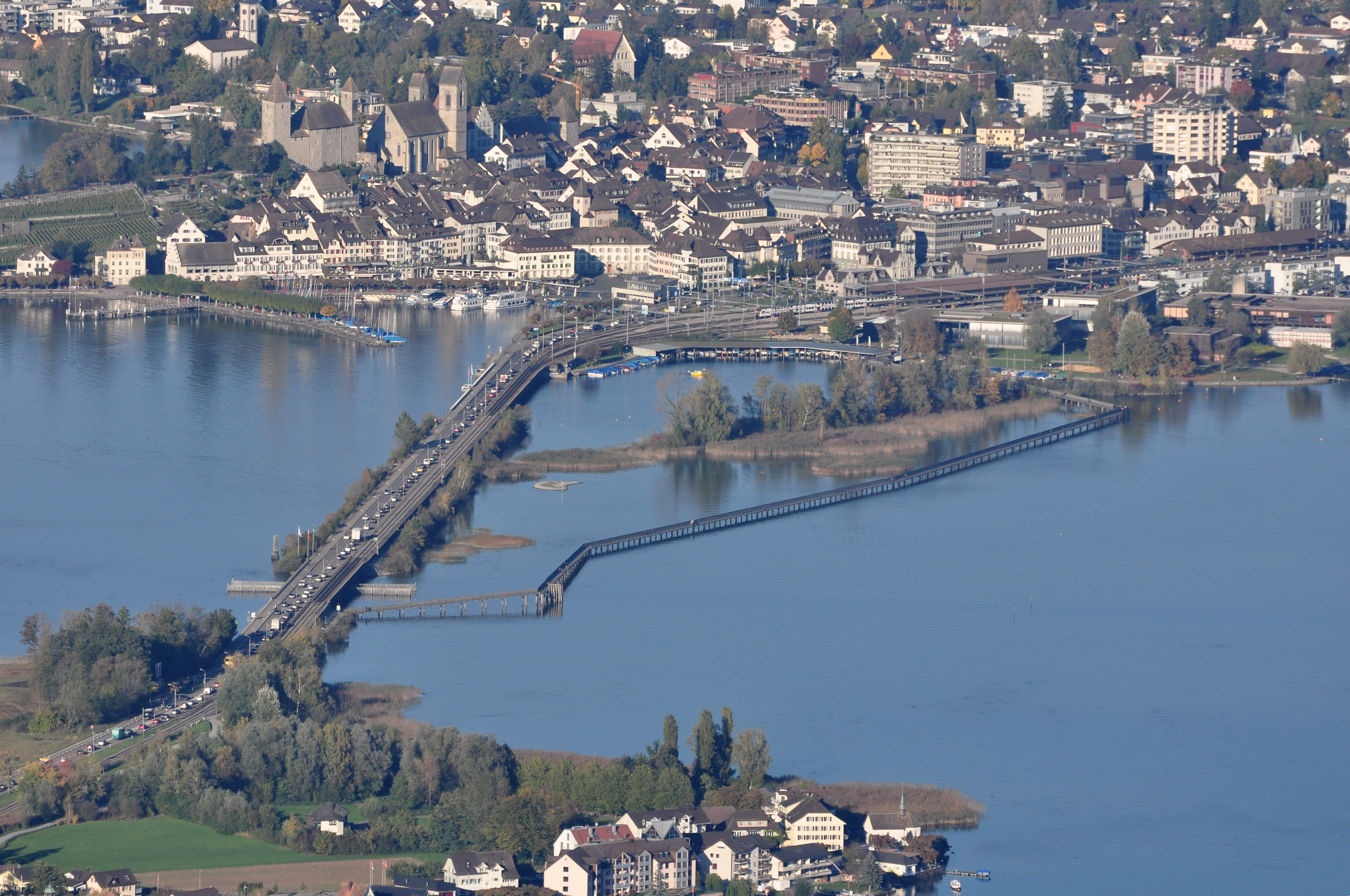
Seedamm causeway between Hurden and Rapperswil, one of suggested pilot testing areas of Mobility Pricing.

== Background ==
By 2030 the so-called Mobility Pricing will be introduced in Switzerland – for rail transport as well as road traffic transport. According to the Swiss Federal Council (Bundesrat), "the individual passenger transport in Switzerland is constantly increasing, caused to the population growth, the higher income per household, and the increasing spatial division of living and working". As more and more people work in the cities but live in the agglomeration, the individual citizens do not bear all the transport costs caused by them. Although the rail and road network constantly will be expanded, especially during rush hours not all bottlenecks will be eliminated. Mobility Pricing is scheduled to break these traffic spikes. An incentive-based transport policy congestion may avoid utilize capacity and save costs. Moreover, also further measures such as flexible working hours, adjusted school hours, home office or carpooling may be introduced.

The proposed traffic congestion user fee for vehicles traveling would affect the most congested areas at certain periods of peak demand. The charge would be combined with other traffic reduction projects. The proposed congestion pricing charge is part of a mobility and pricing study being carried out by the Swiss government to reduce congestion at and near central locations and to reduce its associated environmental impacts, including cutting greenhouse gas emissions.

Mobility pricing shall manage transport infrastructure of road and rail efficiently. According to information from the evaluation report, use-based charges for use of infrastructure and services shall be collected in private and in public transport, with the aim of influencing the demand for mobility.

== Pilot testing ==
Pilot tests will allow to learn how mobility pricing effectively will affects the traffic, the economy, the environment and regional development. The cantons of Genève, Ticino and Zug, as well as the cities of Rapperswil-Jona and Bern announced, during the public hearing prior to September 2016, to be interested in to perform pilot tests. As of June 2016, the Seedamm causeway and the narrow Bahnhofstrasse road in Rapperswil is crossed by about 26,000 vehicles every day. In order to relieve the traffic on road and rail during rush hours, the town of Rapperswil-Jona in the Canton of St. Gallen is expected to participate as the first Swiss city in a presumably 2019 pilot project, although city officials announced on 25 January 2017 to "seek for alternative solutions".
