= Rapperswil-Jona/Hombrechtikon–Feldbach =

Archaeological site in Switzerland

Feldbach
UNESCO World Heritage Site
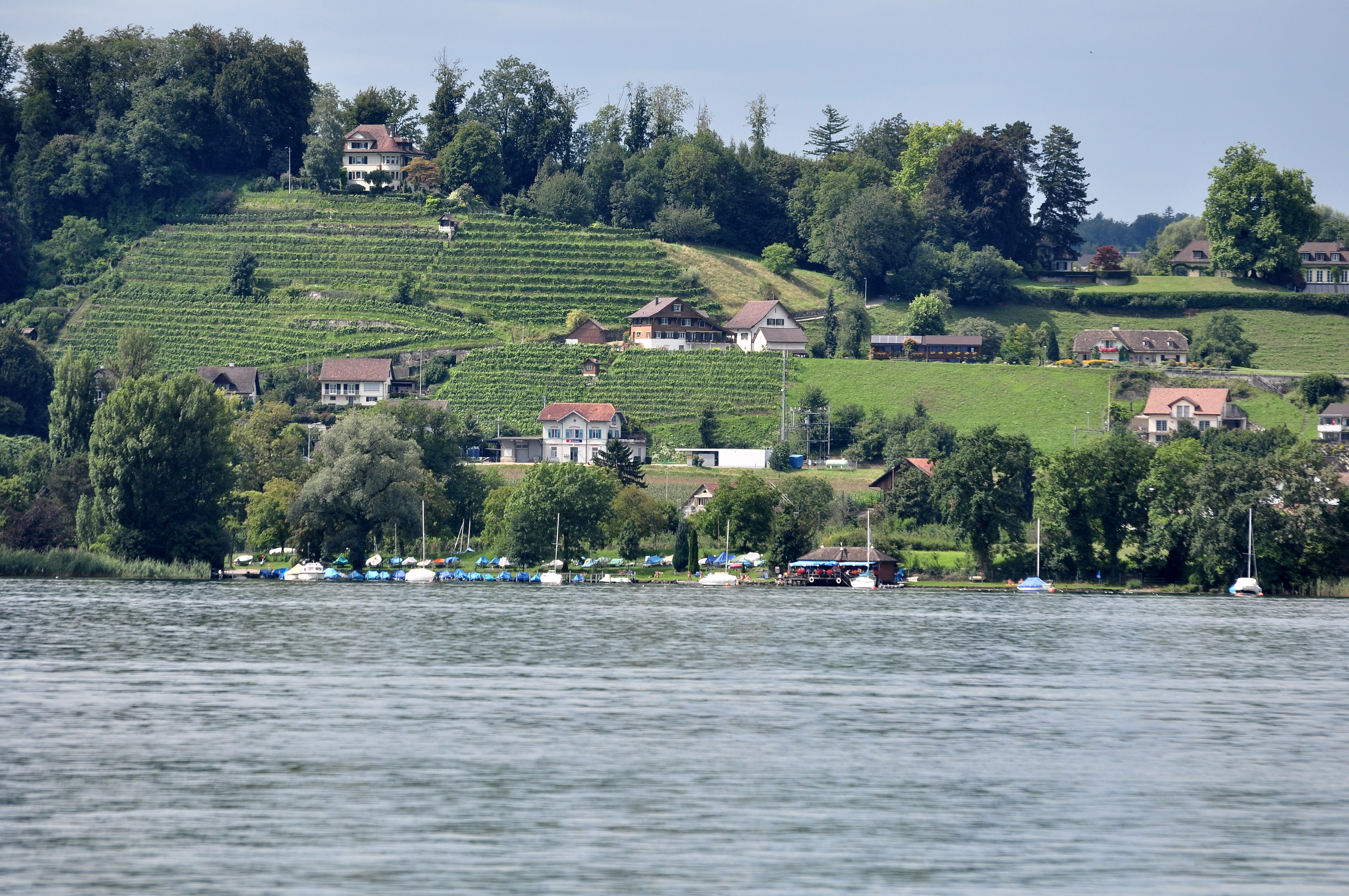
- The site of the prehistoric settlement as seen from the Zürichsee-Schifffahrtsgesellschaft (ZSG) motorship Helvetia

- Location within Canton of Zürich Location within Canton of St. Gallen Location within Switzerland
- Location: Feldbach, Hombrechtikon, Canton of Zürich, and Kempraten, Rapperswil-Jona, Canton of St. Gallen, Switzerland
- Part of: Prehistoric Pile Dwellings around the Alps
- Criteria: Cultural: (iv), (v)
- Reference: 1363-031
- Inscription: 2011 (35th Session)
- Area: 7.5 ha (19 acres)
- Buffer zone: 15.5 ha (38 acres)
- Website: www.palafittes.org/en/index.html
- Coordinates: 47°14′19.67″N 8°47′45.96″E

Rapperswil-Jona/Hombrechtikon–Feldbach is one of the 111 serial sites of the UNESCO World Heritage Site Prehistoric pile dwellings around the Alps, of which are 56 located in Switzerland.

== Geography ==
The site is located on Zürichsee lakeshore in Feldbach and partially in Kempraten, a locality of the municipality of Rapperswil-Jona in the Canton of St. Gallen in Switzerland. Situated nearby the Seedamm, an isthmus between the Zürichsee and the Obersee lake area, it was in close vicinity to the prehistoric lake crossings, neighbored by two other Prehistoric pile dwelling settlements: Freienbach–Hurden Seefeld and Rapperswil-Jona–Technikum. Because the lake has grown in size over time, the original piles are now around 4 metres (13 ft) to 7 metres (23 ft) under the water level of 406 metres (1,332 ft). The settlement comprises 7.5 hectares (18.53 acres), and the buffer zone including the lake area comprises 15.5 hectares (38.30 acres) in all.

The smaller archaeological site Seegubel is located eastwards from the Feldbach site, it is located only some 400 metres away.

== Description ==
Distinctive house plans and a cultural layer dating from the middle phase of the Corded Ware period, is of particular importance in that multi-phase settlement. The evidence of a settlement from the transitional phase between the Early and Middle Bronze Ages, is another interesting aspect of the site, yielded a date of 1490 BC, which is very late within the Early Bronze Age pile-dwelling period. The dates refer to the same period as the transport routes across the lake from Hurden and the slightly post-date neighbouring island settlement in Rapperswil.

== Protection ==
As well as being part of the 56 Swiss sites of the UNESCO World Heritage Site Prehistoric pile dwellings around the Alps, the settlement is also listed in the Swiss inventory of cultural property of national and regional significance as a Class A object of national importance. Hence, the area of each settlement is provided as a historical site under federal protection, within the meaning of the Swiss Federal Act on the nature and cultural heritage (German: Bundesgesetz über den Natur- und Heimatschutz NHG) of 1 July 1966. Unauthorised researching and purposeful gathering of findings represent a criminal offense according to Art. 24.

== See also ==
- Prehistoric pile dwellings around Zürichsee

== Literature ==
- Peter J. Suter, Helmut Schlichtherle et al.: Pfahlbauten – Palafittes – Palafitte. Palafittes, Biel 2009. ISBN 978-3-906140-84-1.
- Beat Eberschweiler: Ur- und frühgeschichtliche Verkehrswege über den Zürichsee: Erste Ergebnisse aus den Taucharchäologischen Untersuchungen beim Seedamm. In: Mitteilungen des Historischen Vereins des Kantons Schwyz, Volume 96, Schwyz 2004.
