= Freienbach–Hurden Rosshorn =

Hurden Rosshorn
UNESCO World Heritage Site
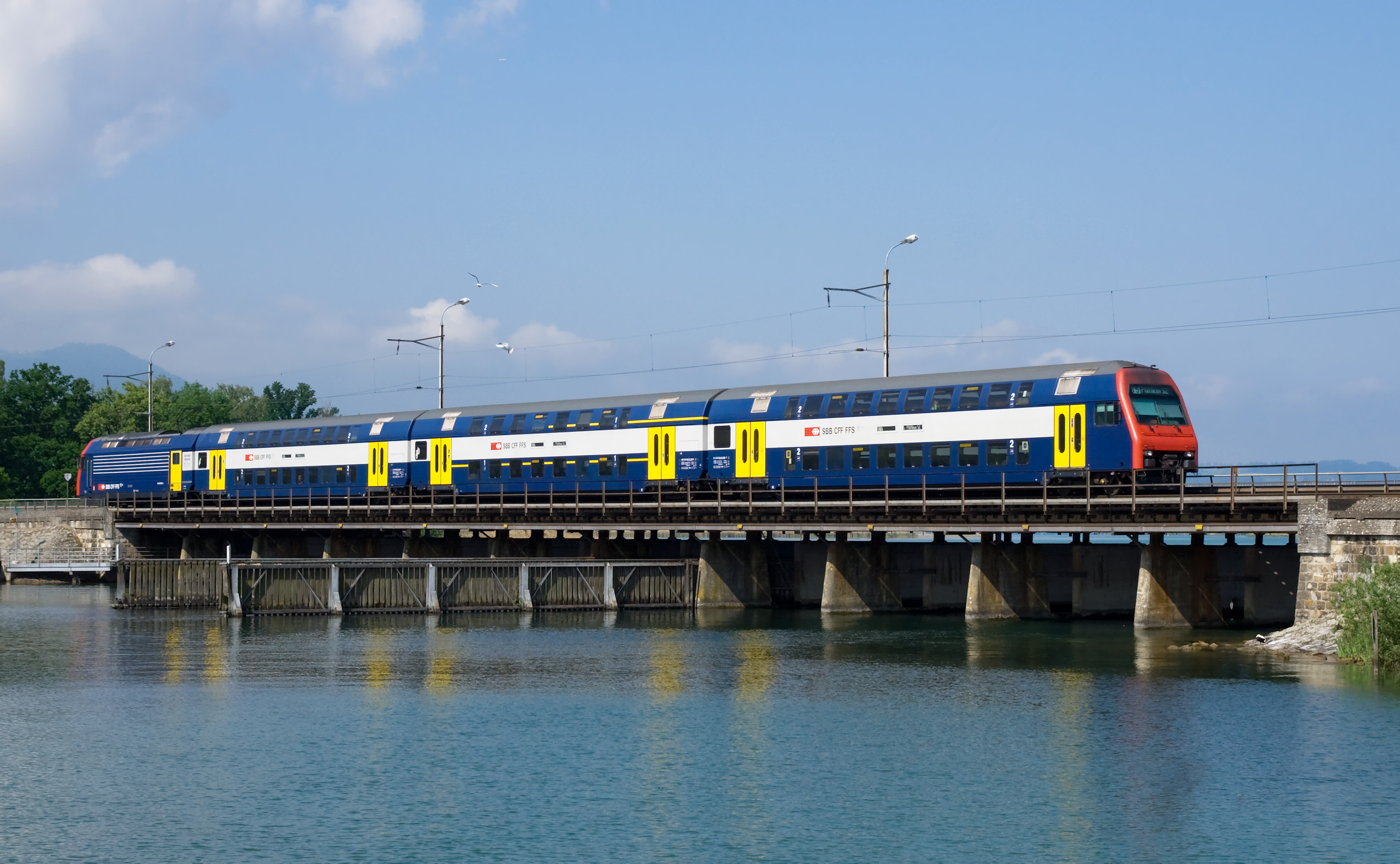
- The centre of the Rosshorn site

- Location within Canton of Schwyz Location within Switzerland
- Location: Hurden, Freienbach, Canton of Schwyz, Switzerland
- Part of: Prehistoric pile dwellings around the Alps
- Criteria: Cultural: (iv), (v)
- Reference: 1363-027
- Inscription: 2011 (35th Session)
- Area: 4.32 ha (10.7 acres)
- Buffer zone: 20.1 ha (50 acres)
- Website: www.palafittes.org/en/index.html
- Coordinates: 47°13′10.38″N 8°48′24.61″E

Freienbach–Hurden Rosshorn, more often called Hurden Rosshorn or simply Rosshorn, is one of the 111 serial sites of the UNESCO World Heritage Prehistoric pile dwellings around the Alps, of which are 56 located in Switzerland. The Rosshorn site is exceptional because it doesn't contain remains of a prehistoric settlement but instead remains of prehistoric and historic bridges that were built in a shallow area of Lake Zurich.

== Geography and location ==
The Rosshorn is the tip of the Hurden peninsula in the Swiss Canton of Schwyz that protrudes into Lake Zurich. A dam called Seedamm connects Hurden Rosshorn and Rapperswil on the other side of the lake. Like various former bridges, the Seedamm runs across the narrowest area of Lake Zurich, dividing the lake's main part and the southeastern Obersee lake area.

The archaeological site Rosshorn is located beneath one of the bridges of the Seedamm and in a small adjoining water area on the Seedamm's western side. It extends from the bridge mainly to the southwest and includes the northern lakeshore of Hurden. The Rosshorn site comprises 4.32 hectares (10.67 acres) and the buffer zone comprises 20.10 hectares (49.67 acres).

Prehistoric pile dwelling settlements were built at several sites in the vicinity, most notably Freienbach–Hurden Seefeld and, on the Rapperswil side, Rapperswil-Jona–Technikum as well as Rapperswil-Jona/Hombrechtikon–Feldbach.

== Findings ==
Freienbach–Hurden Rosshorn provides early evidence of transport routes combined with special metal finds interpreted as sacrificial offerings. The site includes several lake crossings, the earliest dating back to the Horgen culture. Several Early Bronze Age construction phases have been identified, as well as remains from the Hallstatt culture and Roman era providing dendrochronological dates about periods from which no other sites are known.

== Protection ==
As well as being part of the 56 Swiss sites of the UNESCO World Heritage Prehistoric pile dwellings around the Alps, the Rosshorn site is also listed in the Swiss inventory of cultural property of national and regional significance as a Class A object of national importance. Hence, the area is provided as a historical site under federal protection, within the meaning of the Swiss Federal Act on the nature and cultural heritage (German: Bundesgesetz über den Natur- und Heimatschutz NHG) of 1 July 1966. Unauthorised researching and purposeful gathering of findings represent a criminal offense according to Art. 24.

== See also ==
- Prehistoric pile dwellings around Zürichsee

== Literature ==
- Beat Eberschweiler: Ur- und frühgeschichtliche Verkehrswege über den Zürichsee: Erste Ergebnisse aus den taucharchäologischen Untersuchungen beim Seedamm. In: Mitteilungen des Historischen Vereins des Kantons Schwyz, vol. 96, Schwyz 2004, p. 11–32 (online at e-periodica.ch).
- Thomas Scherer, Philipp Wiemann: Freienbach SZ-Hurden Rosshorn: Ur- und frühgeschichtliche Wege und Brücken über den Zürichsee. In: Jahrbuch Archäologie Schweiz, vol. 91, 2008, p. 7–38 (online at e-periodica.ch).
