= Seedamm =

Causeway on Lake Zurich in Switzerland

Coordinates: 47°13′16″N 8°48′40″E

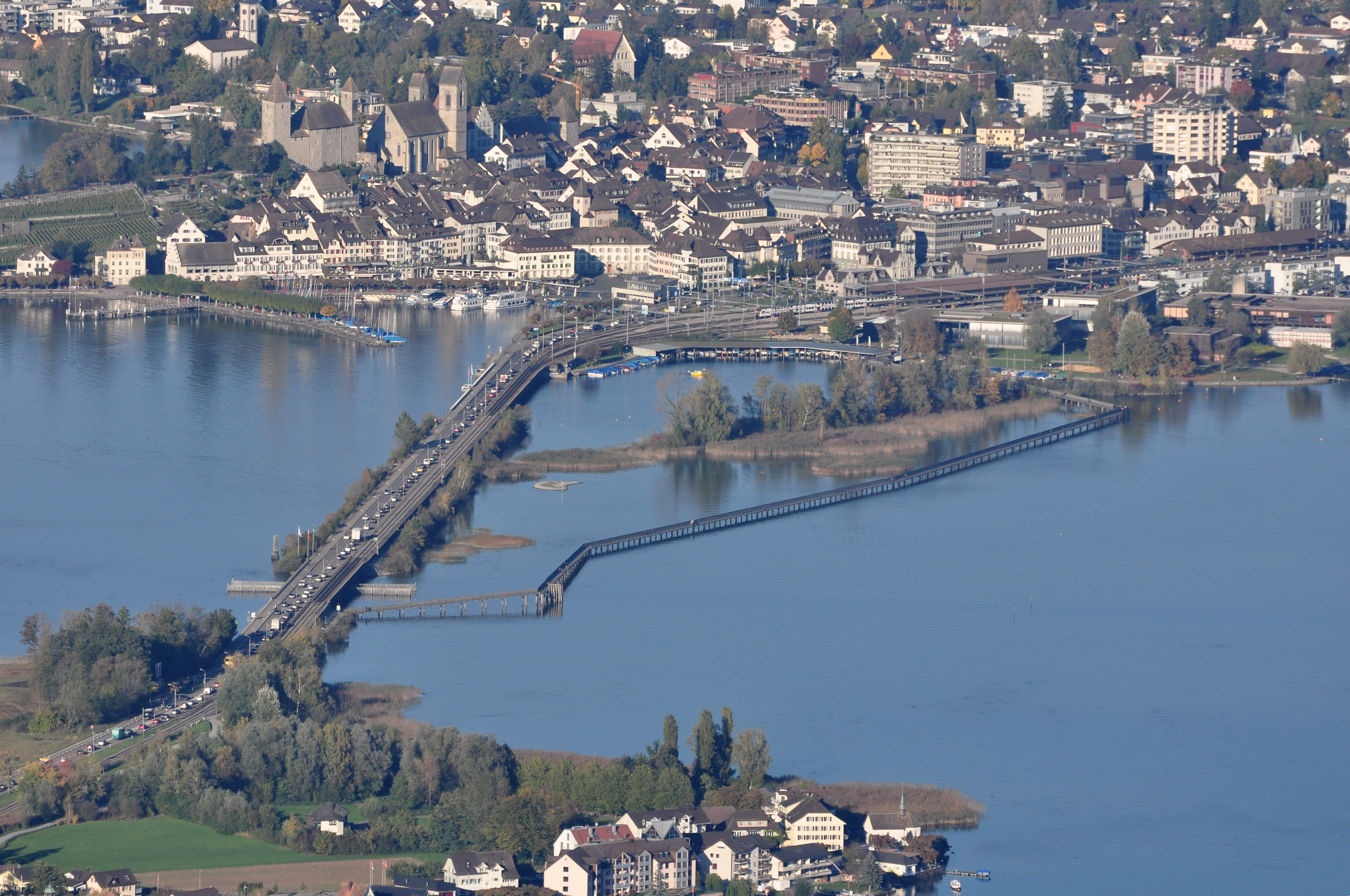
The Seedamm and the wooden bridge (to the right) between Hurden (foreground) and Rapperswil

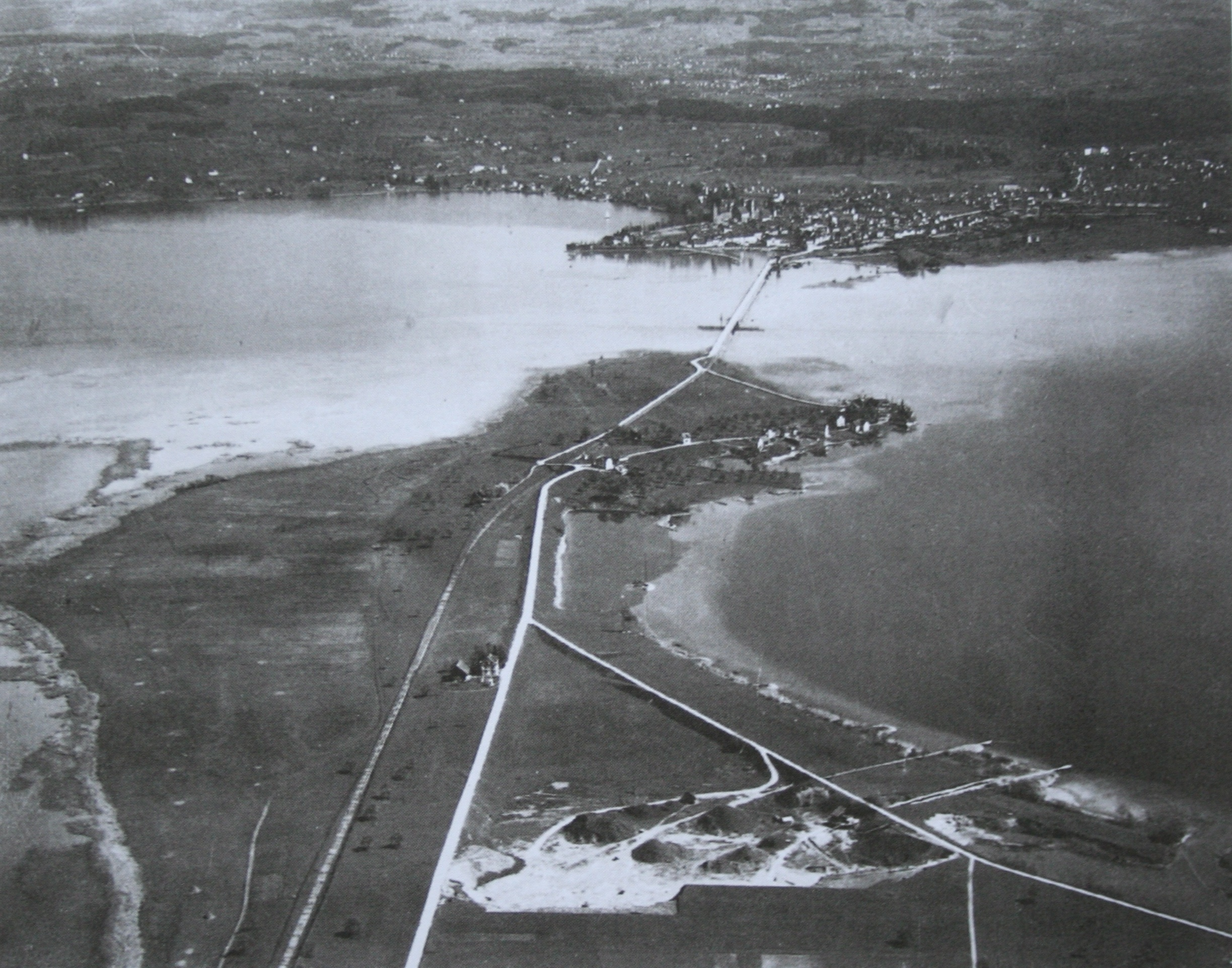
The Hurden peninsula on an aerial photo by Walter Mittelholzer (1929), Seedamm in the background

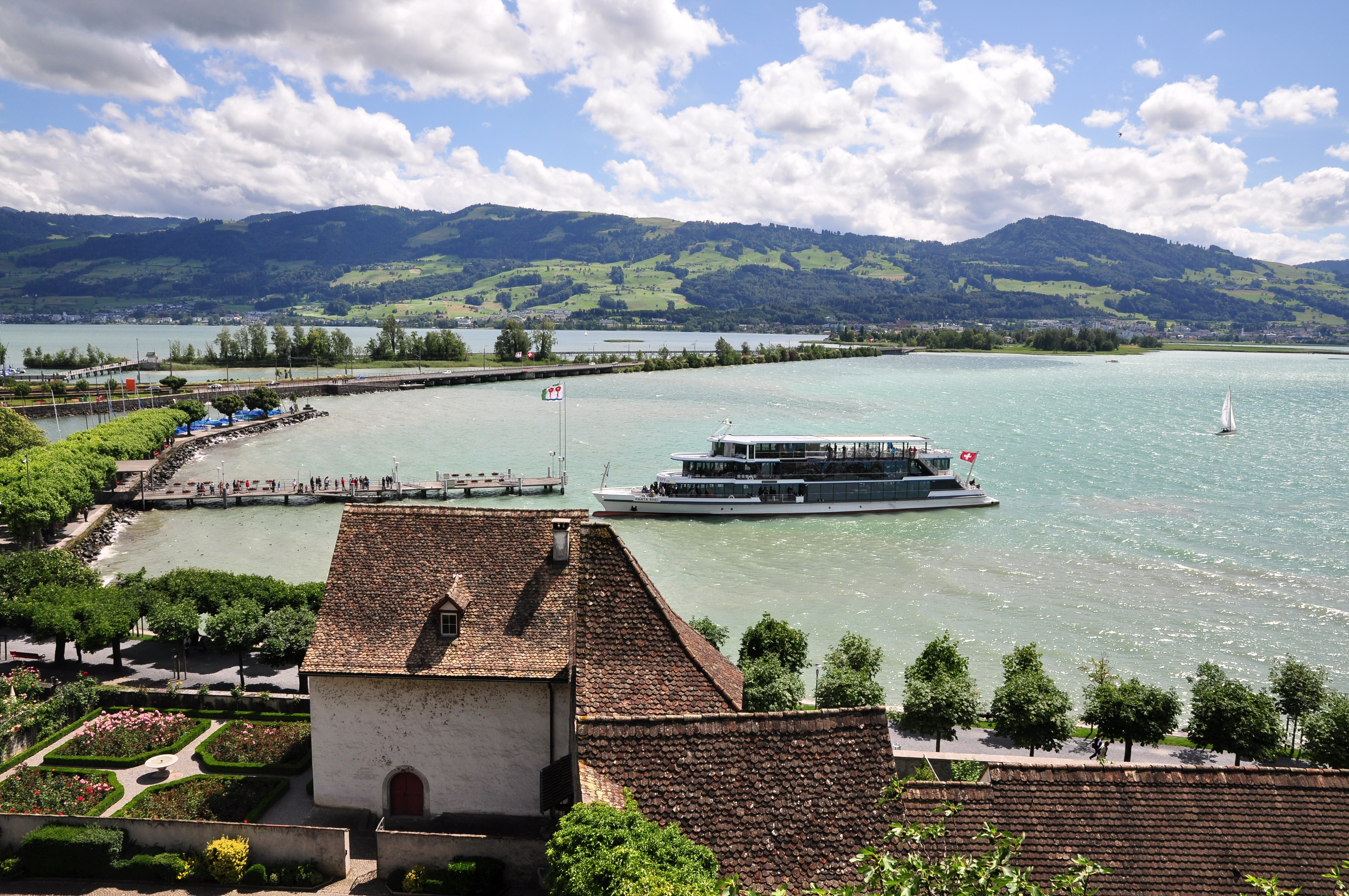
Seedamm as seen from Rapperswil

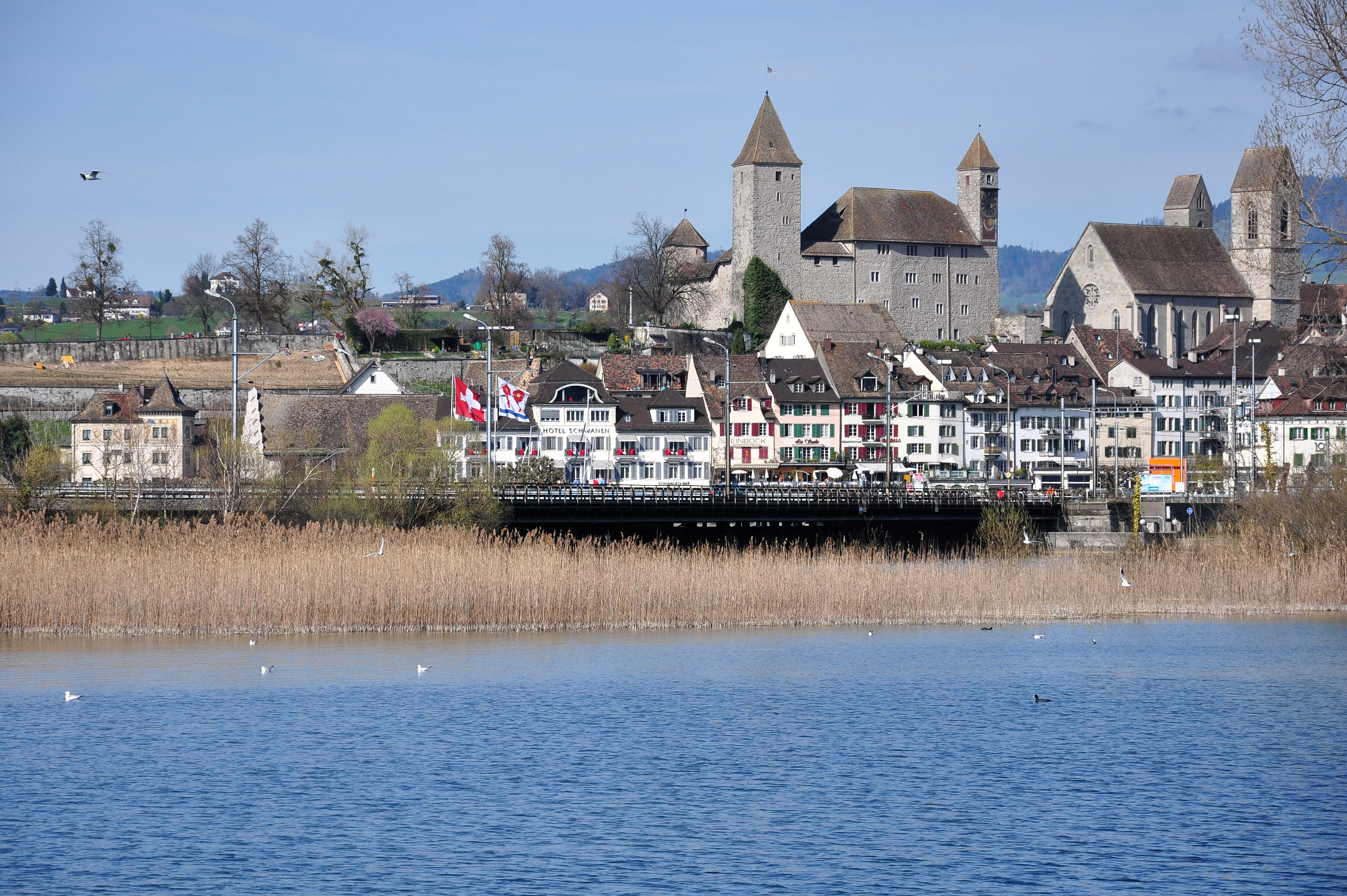
End of the Seedamm in Rapperswil

The Rapperswil Seedamm is an artificial causeway at the narrowest area of Lake Zurich between Hurden (SZ) and Rapperswil (SG). The structure contains two bridge segments and is approximately 1 kilometre (0.62 mi) long. The Seedamm carries a road (Hauptstrasse 8) and a railway across the lake, with the railway being used by the S5 and S40 services of Zurich S-Bahn and by Südostbahn's Voralpen Express.

The Melide causeway, across a narrow section at Lake Lugano, is comparable to the Seedamm.

== Geography and location ==
The Seedamm connects the Swiss cantons of Schwyz (Hurden) and St. Gallen (Rapperswil). The village of Hurden is located on a peninsula protruding from the south shore of Lake Zurich. This peninsula, a terminal moraine, was formed by an ice age glacier (Linth glacier) ca. 17'000 years ago. The Hurden peninsula and the Seedamm divide the main part of Lake Zurich from its upper part, the Obersee. The Seedamm runs across an area of shallow water.

The Holzbrücke Rapperswil-Hurden, a wooden pedestrian bridge built in 2001, is located to the east of the Seedamm. The mire landscape Frauenwinkel is situated on the western side of Hurden and on the southern lakeshore between Hurden and Pfäffikon. The islands Lützelau and Ufenau are located close to the Frauenwinkel.

Remains of Prehistoric lake crossings were found at Freienbach–Hurden Rosshorn, an archaeological site located at one of the Seedamm's bridges.

== History ==
The Seedamm's predecessor was a historical wooden bridge that was first completed in 1360 and rebuilt several times. For centuries, this connection had been part of the so-called Jakobsweg, an old pilgrimage route.

In 1873 the Swiss federal parliament approved the construction of the today's stone causeway and bridge. Construction works began in 1875 and finished in 1878 (in the same year the existing wooden bridge was removed). The construction cost the sum of 1,462,000 Swiss Francs, of which 1,100,000 had been paid by the city of Rapperswil. In 1878 the Zürichsee-Gotthardbahn established the railway line from Rapperswil railway station via Seedamm.

In 1939 and 1951 the now called Seedamm causeway was reinforced to meet growing demand. Whilst the bridge sections of the Seedamm allow smaller vessels to pass under them, the main shipping channel between the lower and upper halves of Lake Zurich now passes through the Hurden ship canal, which was cut through the base of the Hurden peninsular in 1942/43, thus placing the village of Hurden on an artificial island. This canal is spanned by the Sternenbrücke, which also carries both road and railway. This causeway was renovated between March and November 2010 to allow 40 tonne trucks to cross the Seedamm.

At the beginning of the 21st-century, about 75 passenger trains and 24,000 vehicles crossed the causeway and the town of Rapperswil-Jona every day, and as of 2016, an average of 26,000 vehicles. In order to relieve the traffic on road and rail during rush hours, Rapperswil-Jona is expected to participate as the first Swiss city in a pilot project for so-called Mobility pricing.

== Literature ==
- Hans Rathgeb: Brücken über den See. Arbeitsgemeinschaft Fussgänger-Holzsteg Rapperswil-Hurden, Rapperswil 2001. ISBN 3-9522511-1-9

== See also ==
- Seedamm-Center
- Holzbrücke Rapperswil-Hurden
