= Rapperswil-Jona–Technikum =

Archaeological site in Switzerland

Technikum
UNESCO World Heritage Site
- Location within Canton of St. Gallen Location within Switzerland
- Location: Rapperswil, Rapperswil-Jona, Canton of St. Gallen, Switzerland
- Part of: Prehistoric Pile Dwellings around the Alps
- Criteria: Cultural: (iv), (v)
- Reference: 1363-032
- Inscription: 2011 (35th Session)
- Area: 0.92 ha (2.3 acres)
- Buffer zone: 49.1 ha (121 acres)
- Website: www.palafittes.org/en/index.html
- Coordinates: 47°13′14.22″N 8°48′56.55″E

Rapperswil-Jona–Technikum is one of the 111 serial sites of the UNESCO World Heritage Site Prehistoric pile dwellings around the Alps, of which are 56 located in Switzerland. It is a small former island in the upper Lake Zürich in Rapperswil, a locality of the municipality of Rapperswil-Jona in the Canton of St. Gallen.

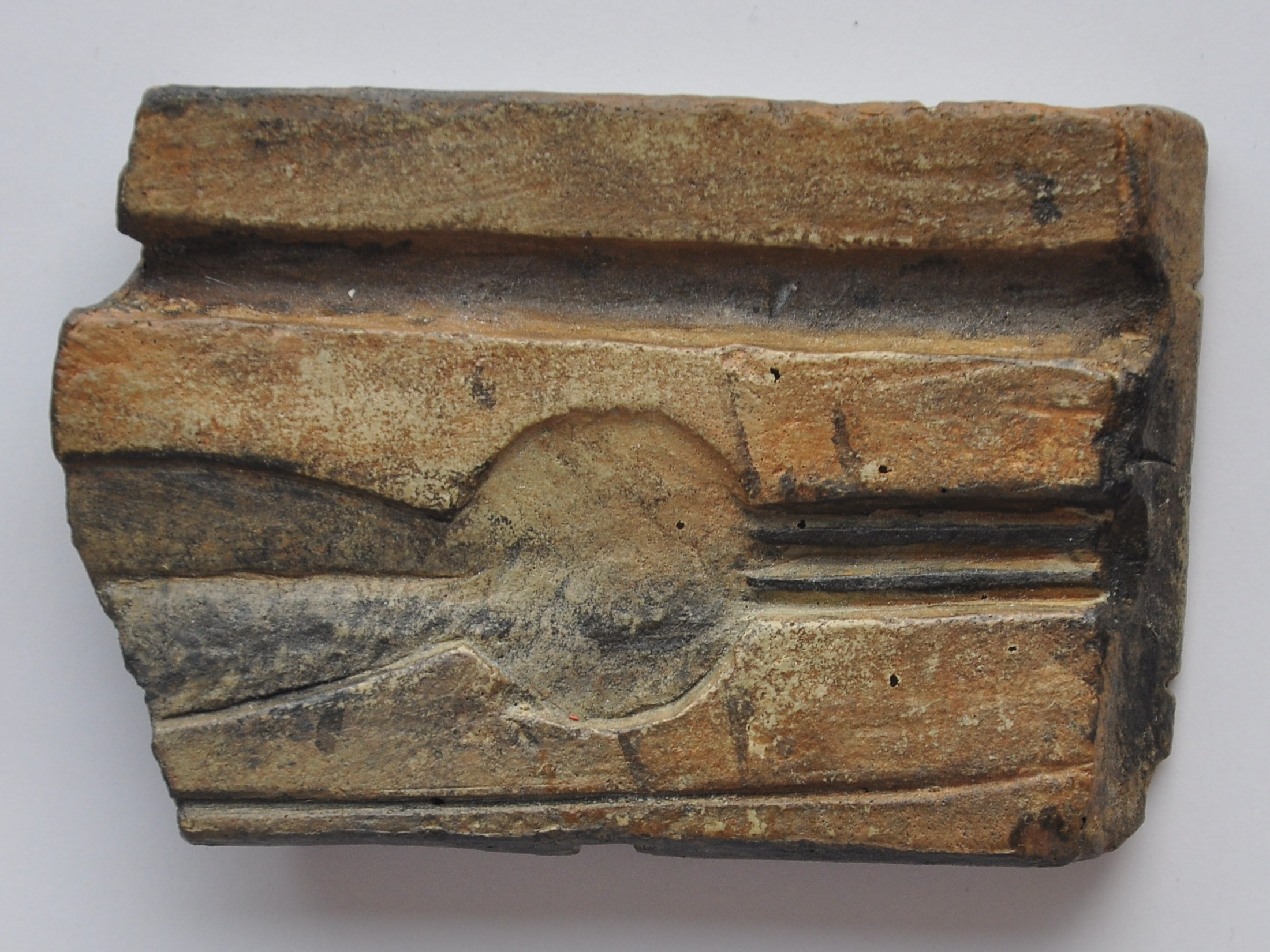
casing mould made of soapstone

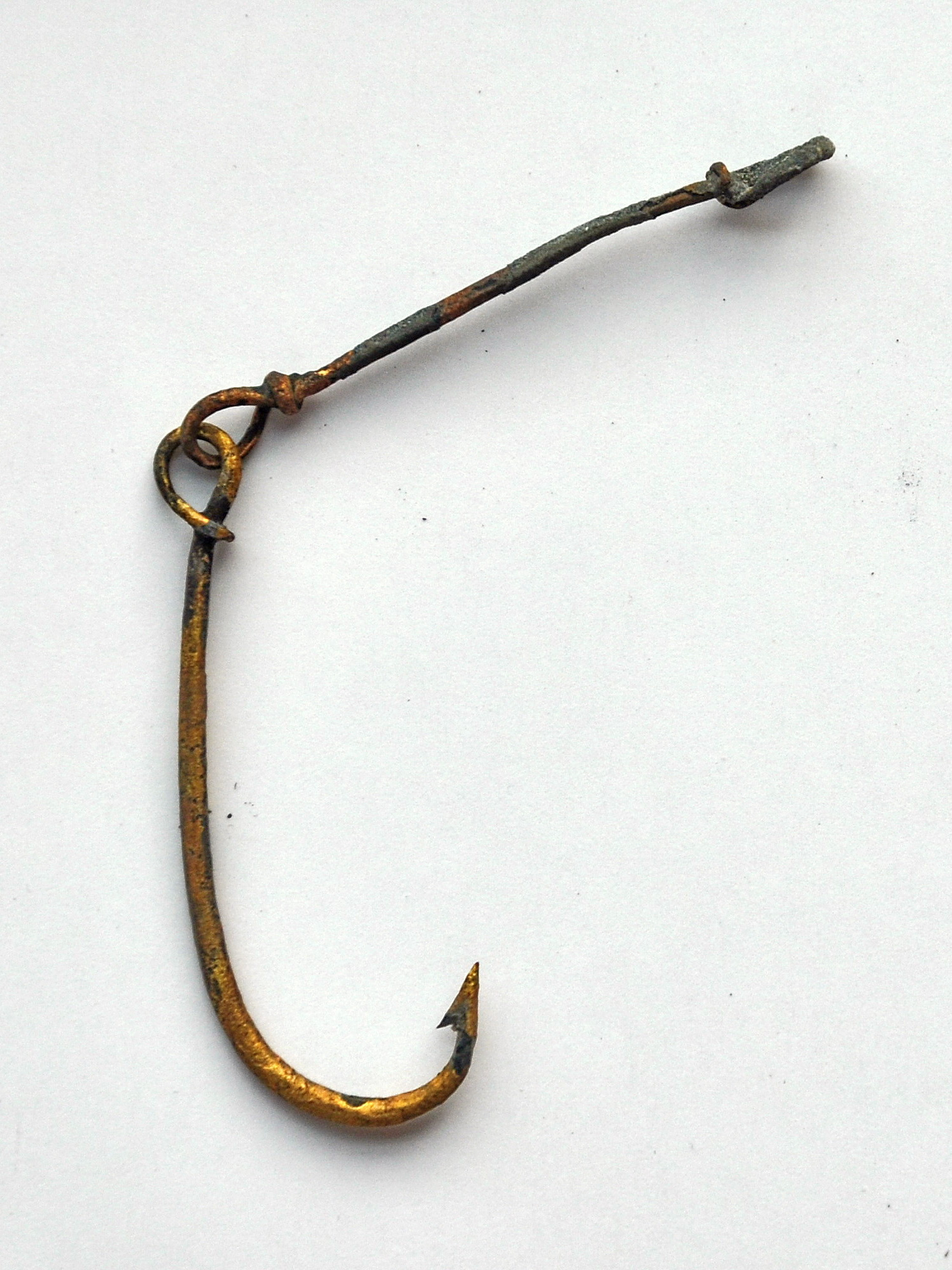
fishhook made of bronze

== Geography ==
The former island is located south of the former Technicum university in Rapperswil and not far away from the prehistoric lake crossings. Because the lake has grown in size over time, the original piles are now around 3 metres (10 ft) under the water level of 406 metres (1,332 ft). The site comprises 0.92 hectares (2.27 acres) and the buffer zone comprises 49.1 hectares (121.33 acres).

== Description ==
Multiple palisades and a clear visible settlement structure characterise the Early Bronze Age site dated in the 17th century BC. It points to the same period as the early footbridges between Rapperswil and Hurden-Rosshorn. The settlement was certainly of great importance as the centre of the region, and it may even have played a role in controlling this important transport route.

== Finds ==
The finds include ceramic and dress pins, daggers, arrowheads, and fish hooks made of bronze, which were probably thrown as offerings into the lake. The individual finds are varied, including pottery shards, an almost completely preserved decorated ceramic vessel, a stone and a bronze ax and a piece of a gold wire; a rare golden object yet discovered from the Bronze Age in Switzerland. As remarkable is a mold made of soapstone for razor of the so-called alpine type. Such blades have been found in the Alpine region, where the soapstone comes from, so the settlement probably served as a hub for the trade with the Alpine passes.

== Protection ==
As well as being part of the 56 Swiss sites of the UNESCO World Heritage Site Prehistoric pile dwellings around the Alps, the settlement is also listed in the Swiss inventory of cultural property of national and regional significance as a Class A object of national importance. Hence, the area of each settlement is provided as a historical site under federal protection, within the meaning of the Swiss Federal Act on the nature and cultural heritage (German: Bundesgesetz über den Natur- und Heimatschutz NHG) of 1 July 1966. Unauthorised researching and purposeful gathering of findings represent a criminal offense according to Art. 24.

== See also ==
- Prehistoric pile dwellings around Zürichsee

== Literature ==
- Peter J. Suter, Helmut Schlichtherle et al.: Pfahlbauten – Palafittes – Palafitte. Palafittes, Biel 2009. ISBN 978-3-906140-84-1.
- Beat Eberschweiler: Ur- und frühgeschichtliche Verkehrswege über den Zürichsee: Erste Ergebnisse aus den Taucharchäologischen Untersuchungen beim Seedamm. In: Mitteilungen des Historischen Vereins des Kantons Schwyz, Volume 96, Schwyz 2004.
