= Saint Kunigunde =

Saint Kunigunde or Cunegund may refer to:

- Kunigunde of Rapperswil (fl. early 4th century), companion of Saint Ursula
- Cunigunde of Luxembourg (died 1040), empress
- Kunigunde or Kinga of Poland (1224–1292), wife of Bolesław V the Chaste
