= Rapperswil =

Former municipality of Switzerland in St. Gallen

- Former municipality
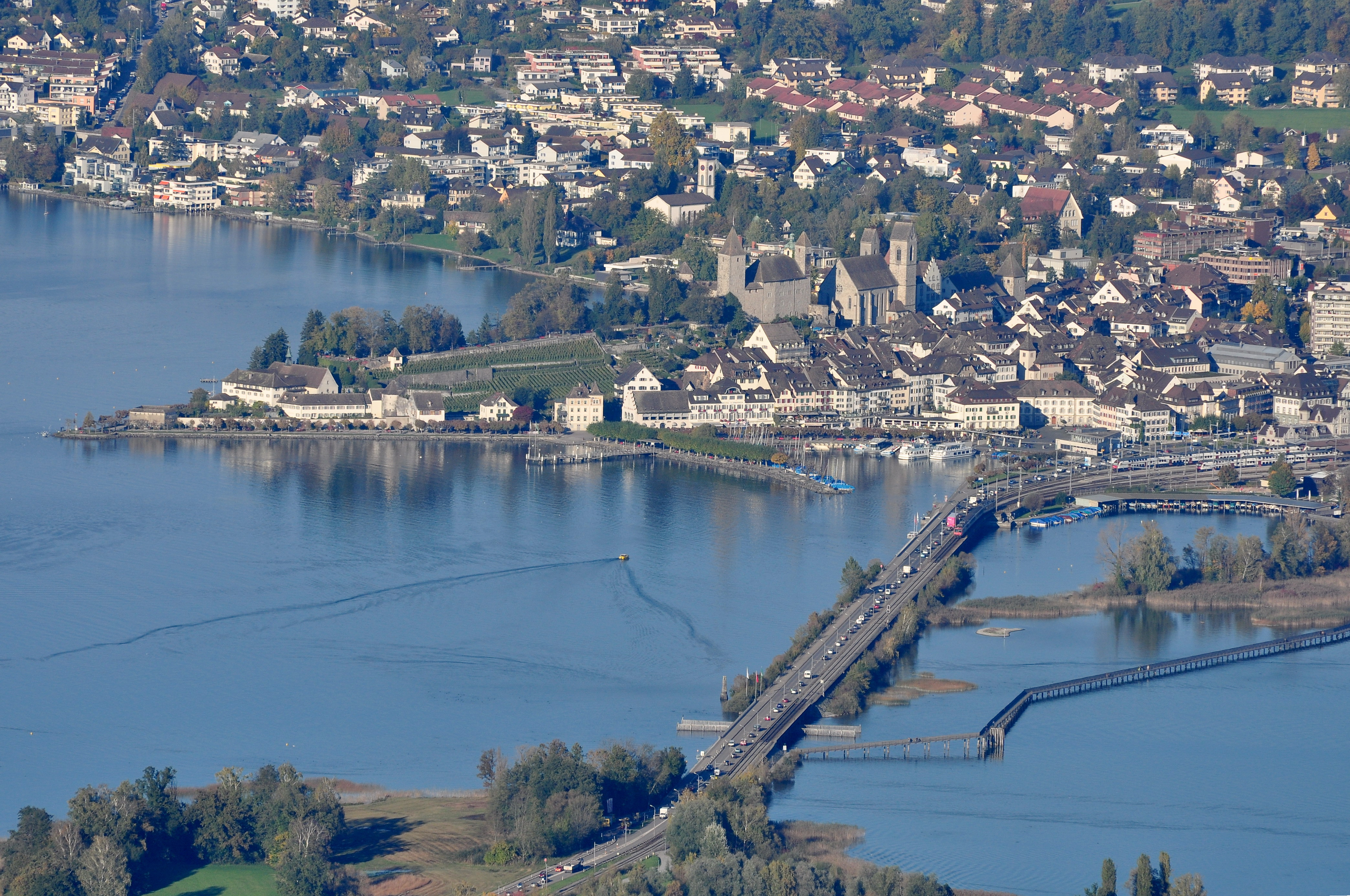
- Rapperswil as seen from Etzel mountain: Capuchin monastery to the left, Rapperswil castle and St. John's church in the background, Lake Zurich harbour and Altstadt in the foreground respectively Seedamm, wooden bridge and upper Lake Zurich to the right (October 2010)

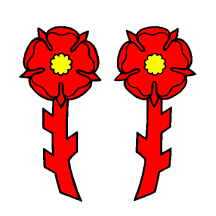
- Flag Coat of arms
- Location of Rapperswil
- Location within Switzerland Location within Canton of St. Gallen
- Coordinates: 47°13.6′N 8°49′E
- Country: Switzerland
- Canton: St. Gallen
- District: See-Gaster
- Municipality: Rapperswil-Jona

Government
  - Mayor: Stadtpräsident/Stadtammann (list)

Area
  - Total: 1.74 km^{2} (0.67 sq mi)
- Elevation: 409 m (1,342 ft)

Population (December 2006)
  - Total: 7,601
  - Density: 4,370/km^{2} (11,300/sq mi)
- Time zone: UTC+01:00 (CET)
  - Summer (DST): UTC+02:00 (CEST)
- Postal code: 8640
- SFOS number: 3336
- ISO 3166 code: CH-SG
- Surrounded by: Altendorf (SZ), Freienbach (SZ), Jona, Bollingen, Lachen (SZ)
- Website: www.rapperswil.ch

Rapperswil (Swiss Standard German: [ˈrapərsˌvɪl]; Swiss German: [ˈrɑpːərʃˌʋiːl] or [ˈrɑpːərsˌʋiːl]; short: Rappi) is a former municipality and since January 2007 part of the municipality of Rapperswil-Jona in the constituency of See-Gaster in the canton of St. Gallen in Switzerland, located between Obersee and the main part of Lake Zurich.

== Geography ==
Rapperswil is located on the northern shore of Lake Zurich at the point at which the lake is cut in two by the Seedamm isthmus, which is an ice age moraine. The upper (or eastern) part of Lake Zurich is called Obersee. Part of the old town, the castle and monastery are situated on a peninsula.

== Sights ==
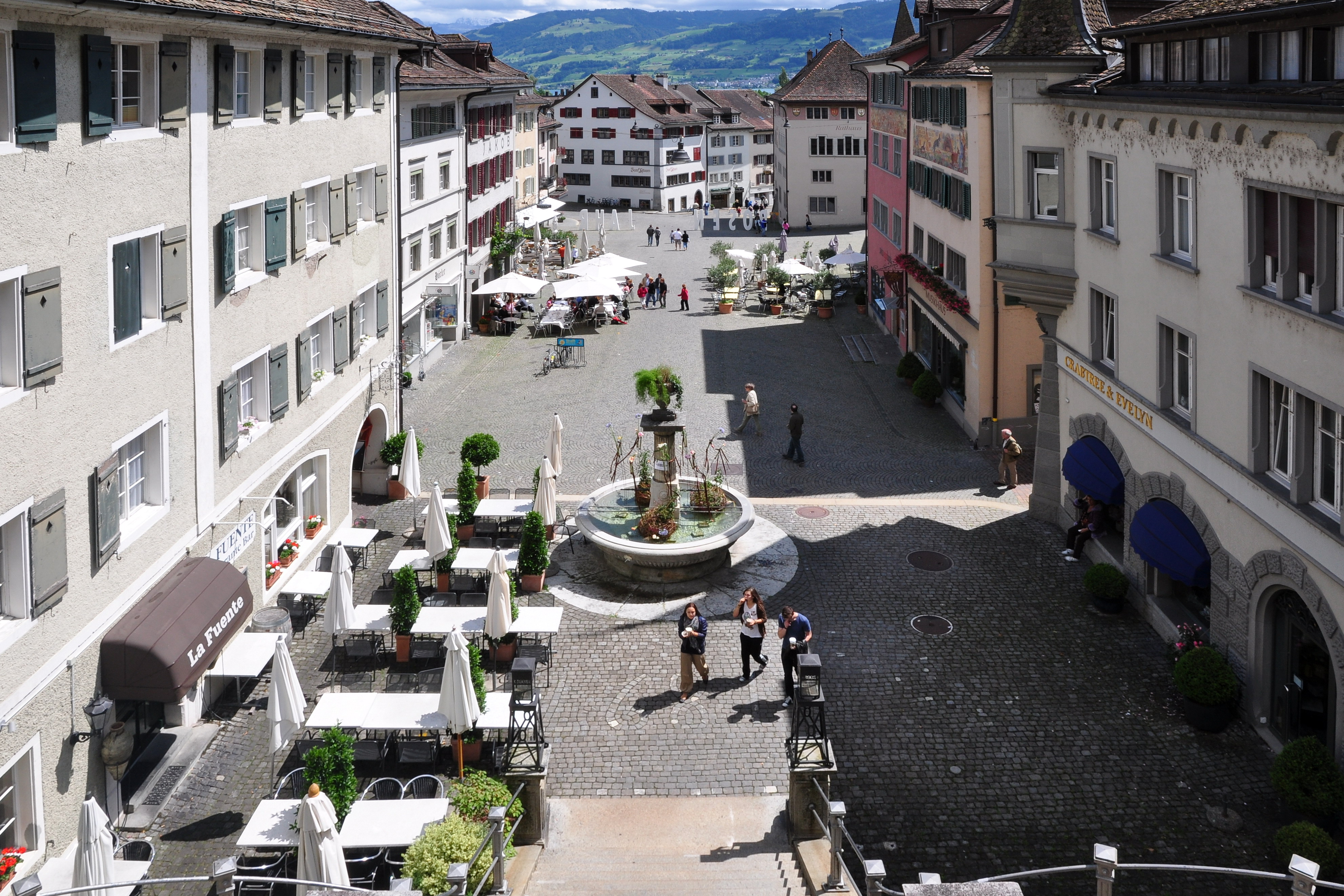
Rapperswil Hauptplatz (main square), former Rathaus (town hall) to the right

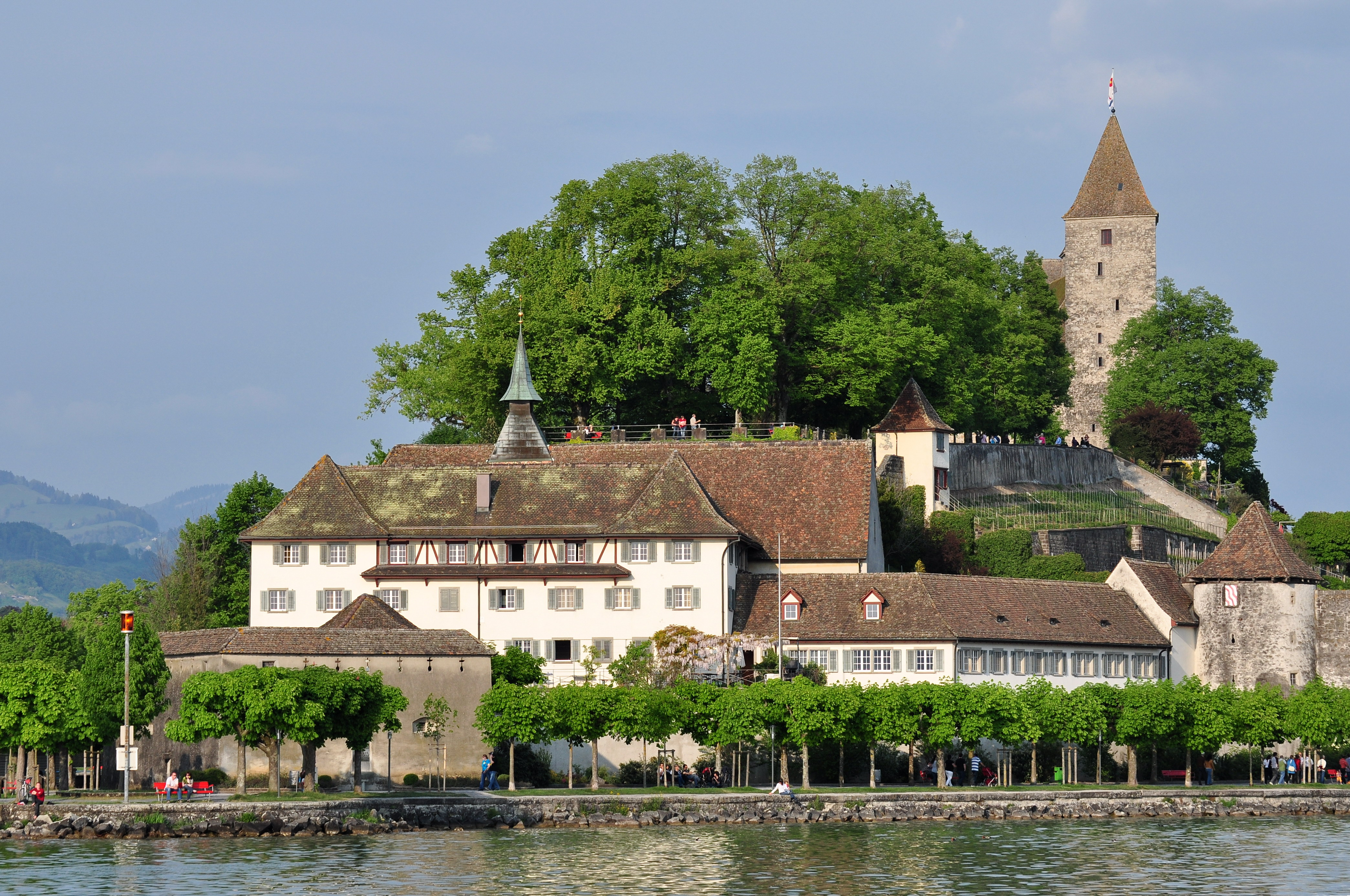
Rapperswil peninsula; Einsiedlerhaus and parts of the Capuchin monastery's (to the right), the rose gardens and Technical University (HSR) (to the left), as seen from Lindenhof at the Rapperswil castle

The town's main sights are concentrated in the Altstadt of Rapperswil and can be seen while strolling through the medieval alleys. The main sights of Rapperswil are its rose gardens, Rapperswil Castle, the reconstructed wooden bridge to Hurden with its bridge chapel Heilig Hüsli located at Seedamm, the Kapuzinerkloster (Capuchin's monastery), the remains of the Middle Ages fortifications located on Lake Zurich, Lindenhof hill, Herrenberg, Engelplatz, Hauptplatz, Bühlerallee and Fischmarktplatz at Rapperswil harbour.

Rapperswil is often referred to as the "town of roses" (Rosenstadt) because of its extensive displays of roses in three designated parks. No less than 15,000 plants of 600 different kinds may be viewed between June and October. There is also a rose garden in the town center, accessible to blind and disabled people.

The old town (Altstadt) is dominated by the Schloss Rapperswil located at the peninsula called Endingen, Lindenhof and Herrenberg on Lake Zurich perched atop this rocky hill at the bay of Kempraten. The castle dates back to the early 13th century (first mentioned in 1229). In 1350, it was destroyed by Rudolf Brun, the mayor of Zurich, and was rebuilt in 1352/54 by Albrecht II, Duke of Austria. Deer inhabit lands surrounding the castle. Since 1870, the castle has been home to the Polish National Museum created by Polish émigrés, including the castle's lessee and restorer, Count Wladyslaw Broel-Plater.

A small Capuchin's monastery was established in 1606 at the lakeside Endingerhorn as a Catholic counterpart to the Reformation's centre in the city of Zurich. The monastery buildings belong to the citizens of Rapperswil (Endingen itself belongs to the Einsiedeln Abbey) rather than to the monks who inhabit it, and is still in use. The main churches in town include the Roman Catholic St. John's Church (built in early 13th century), the cemetery chapel (Liebfrauenkapelle) and a small Protestant church.

The locational advantage of the place attracted the national Circus Knie who built its headquarters in Rapperswil in 1919. The circus is now also responsible for the Circus Museum and the Knie's Kinderzoo located in Rapperswil which is particularly aimed at children. Rapperswil also hosts the Hochschule für Technik Rapperswil HSR (University of Applied Sciences Rapperswil) and an Economics school for parts of the cantons Zurich and St. Gallen.

Zürichsee-Schifffahrtsgesellschaft (commonly abbreviated to ZSG) operates passenger vessels on Lake Zurich (Zürichsee), connecting the surrounding towns between Zürich-Bürkliplatz and the Rapperswil peninsula with its harbour area.

== History ==
=== Early history ===
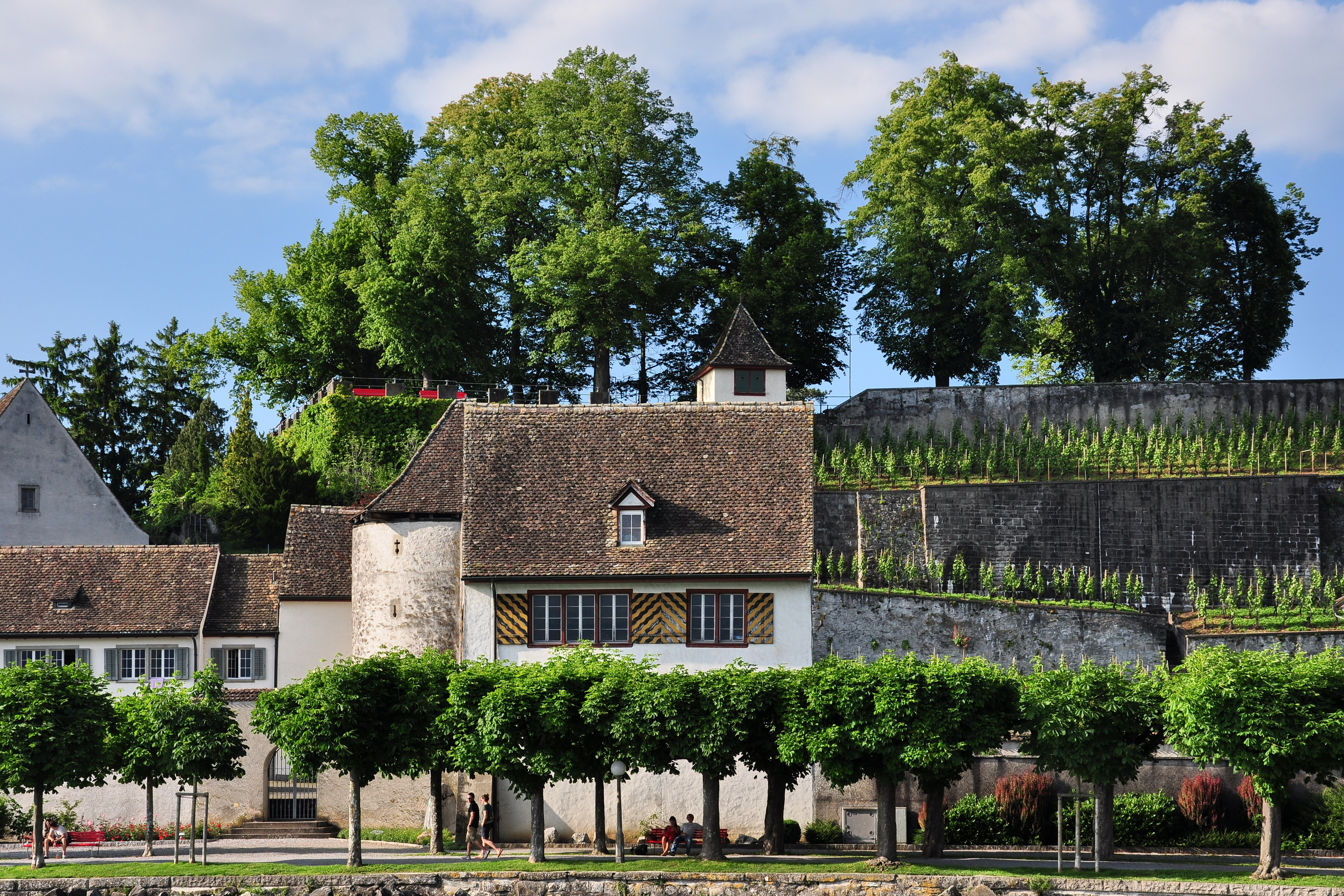
Einsiedlerhaus, Endingertor and southern town walls, as seen from Lake Zurich, Capuchin monastery to the left, the vineyards and Lindenhof hill in the background

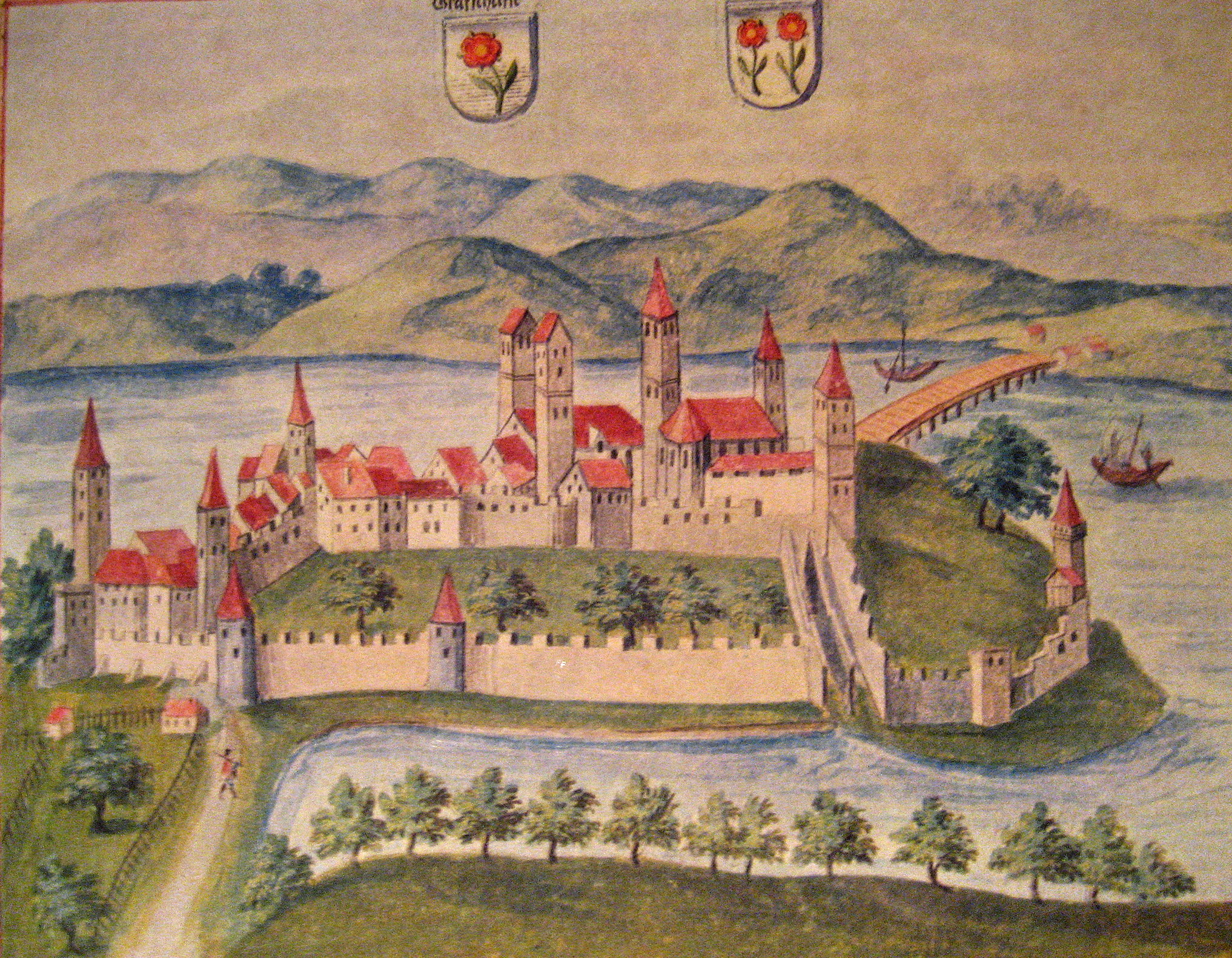
Rapperswil on Codex Vindobonensis (1550)

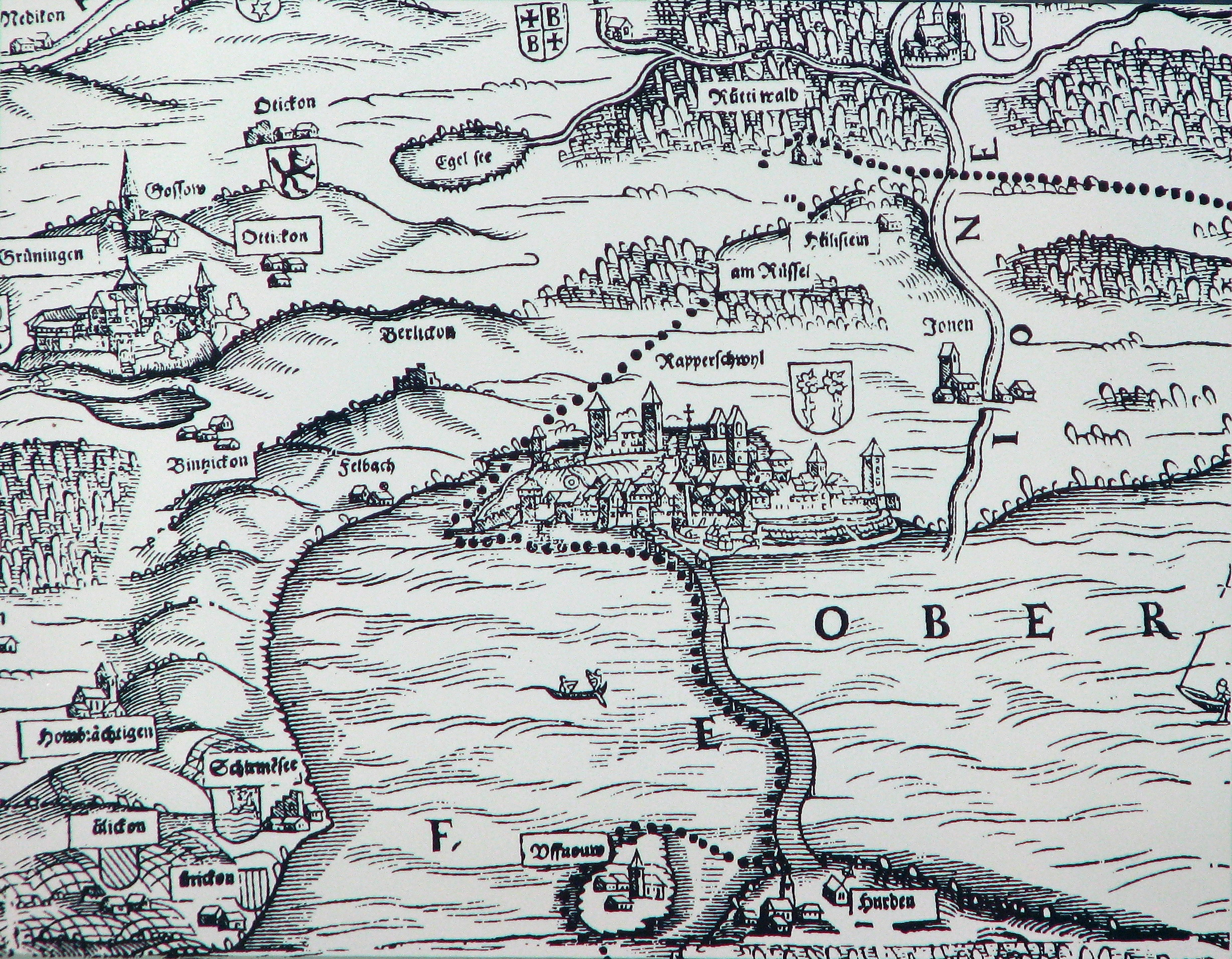
Upper Lake Zurich and its medieval central municipality Rapperswil on Murerplan (1566)

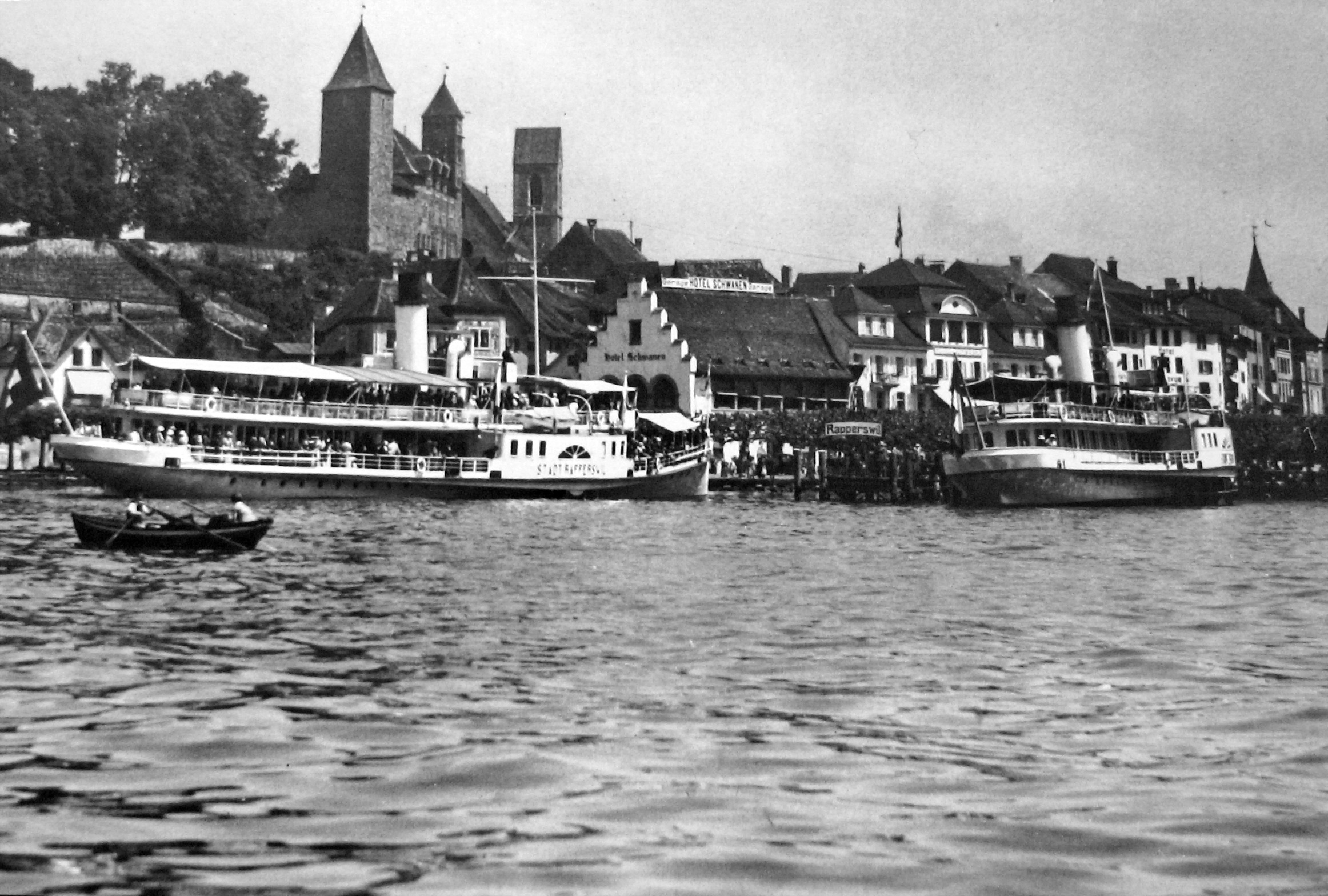
ZSG paddle steamships Stadt Rapperswil (to the left) and Stadt Zürich at Rapperswil harbour (1914)

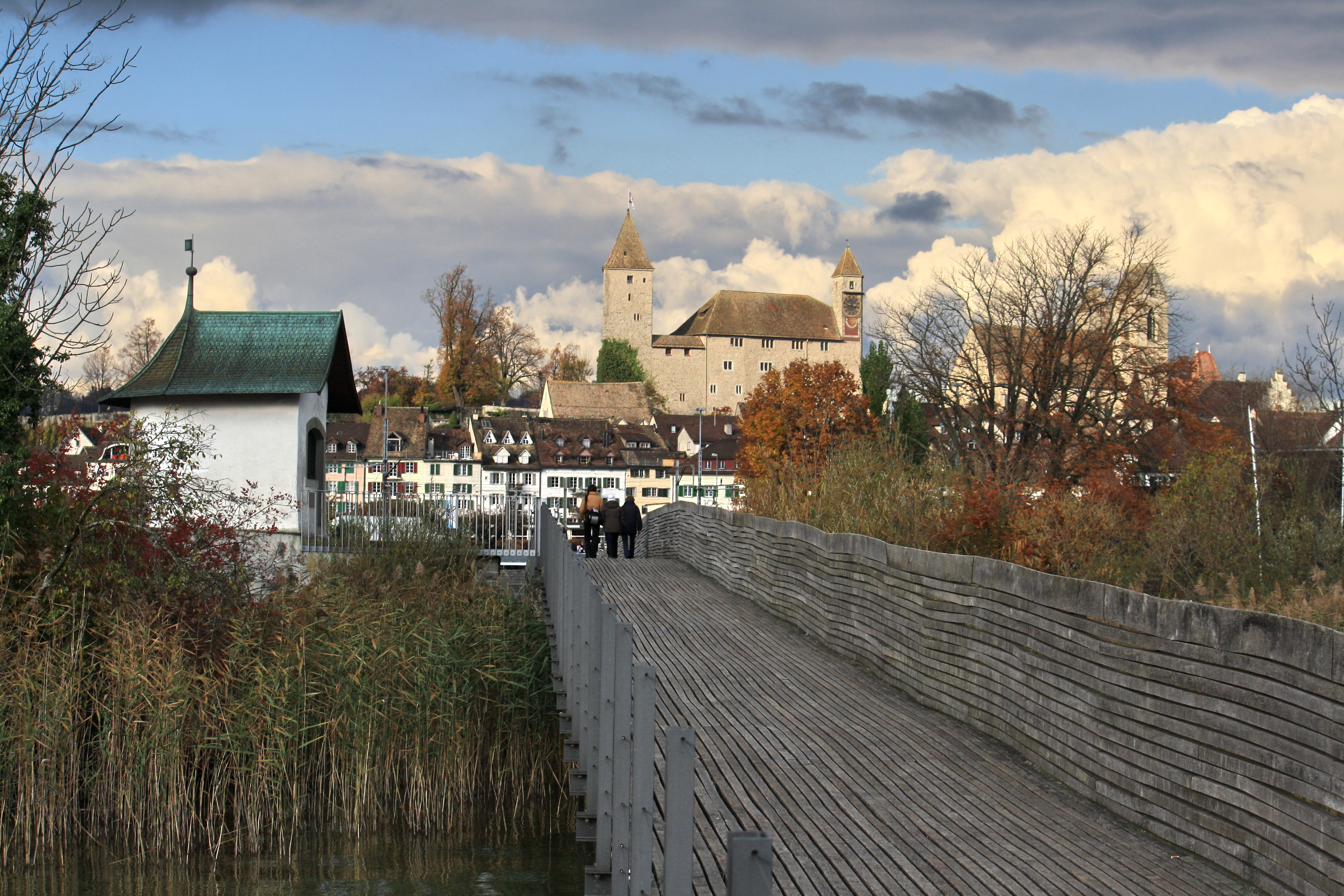
Holzbrücke Rapperswil-Hurden, Seedamm to the left, Heilig Hüsli and Rapperswil in the background

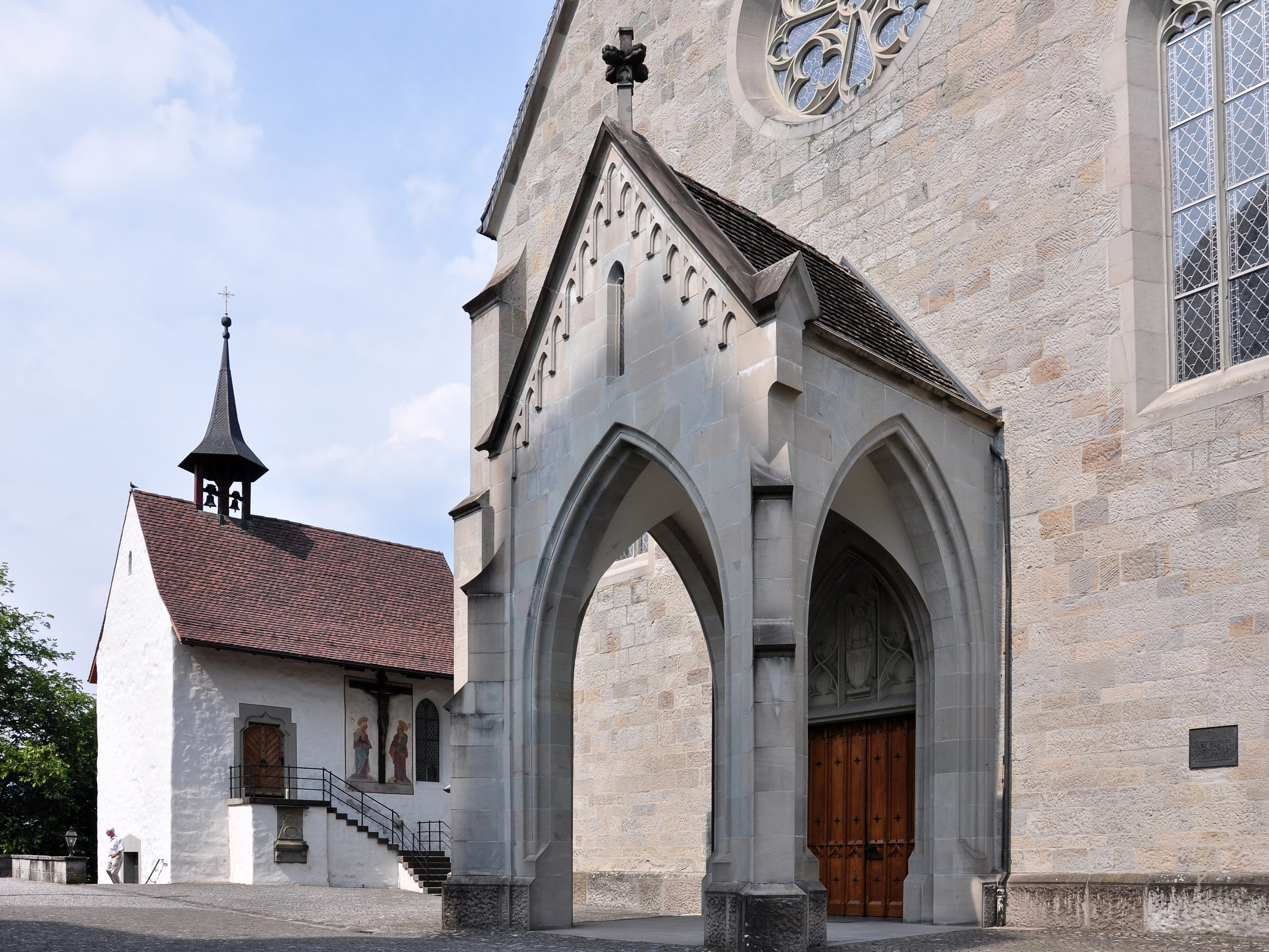
St. John's church portal and Liebfrauenkapelle to the left

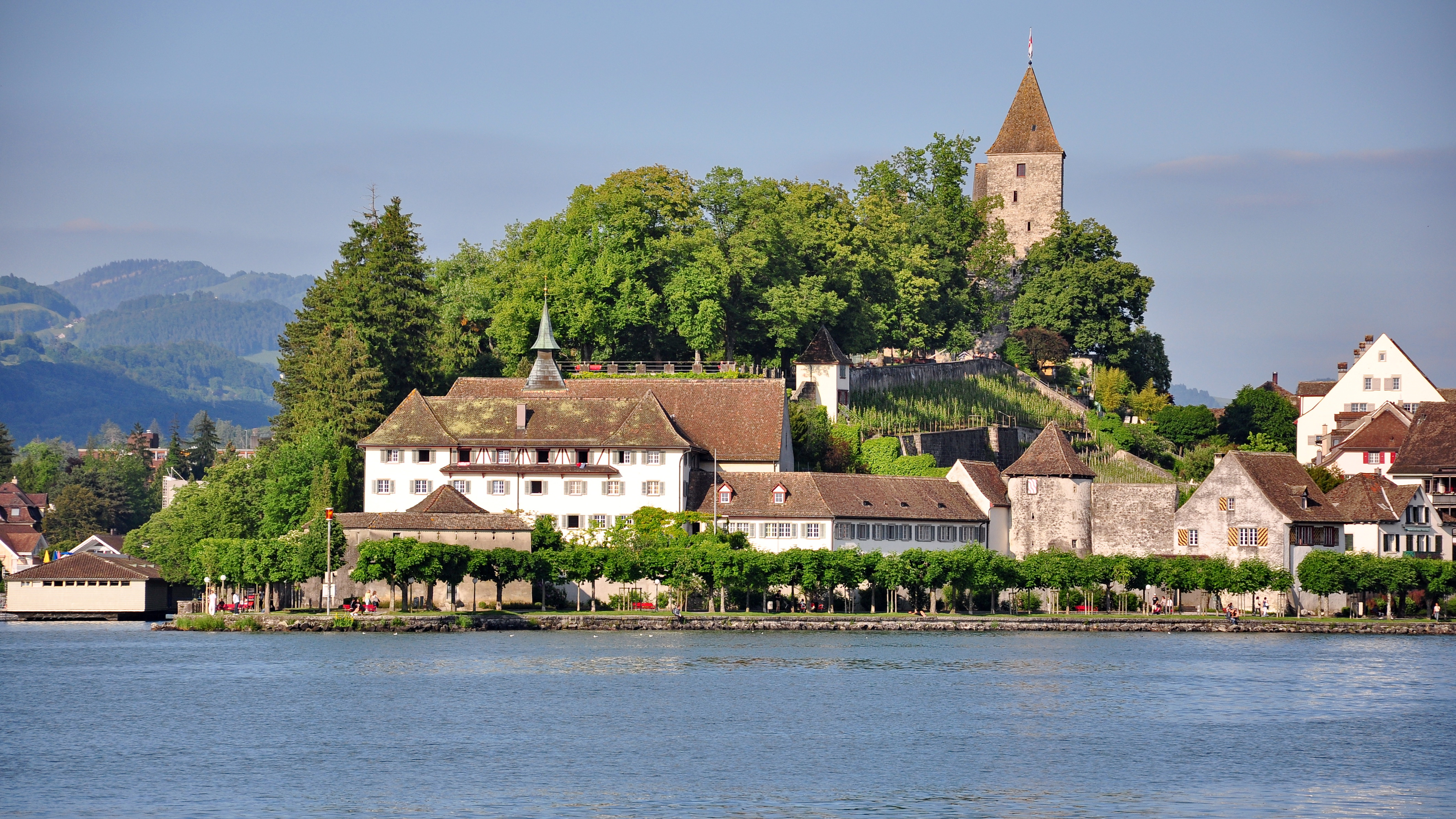
Capuchin monastery as seen from Lake Zurich

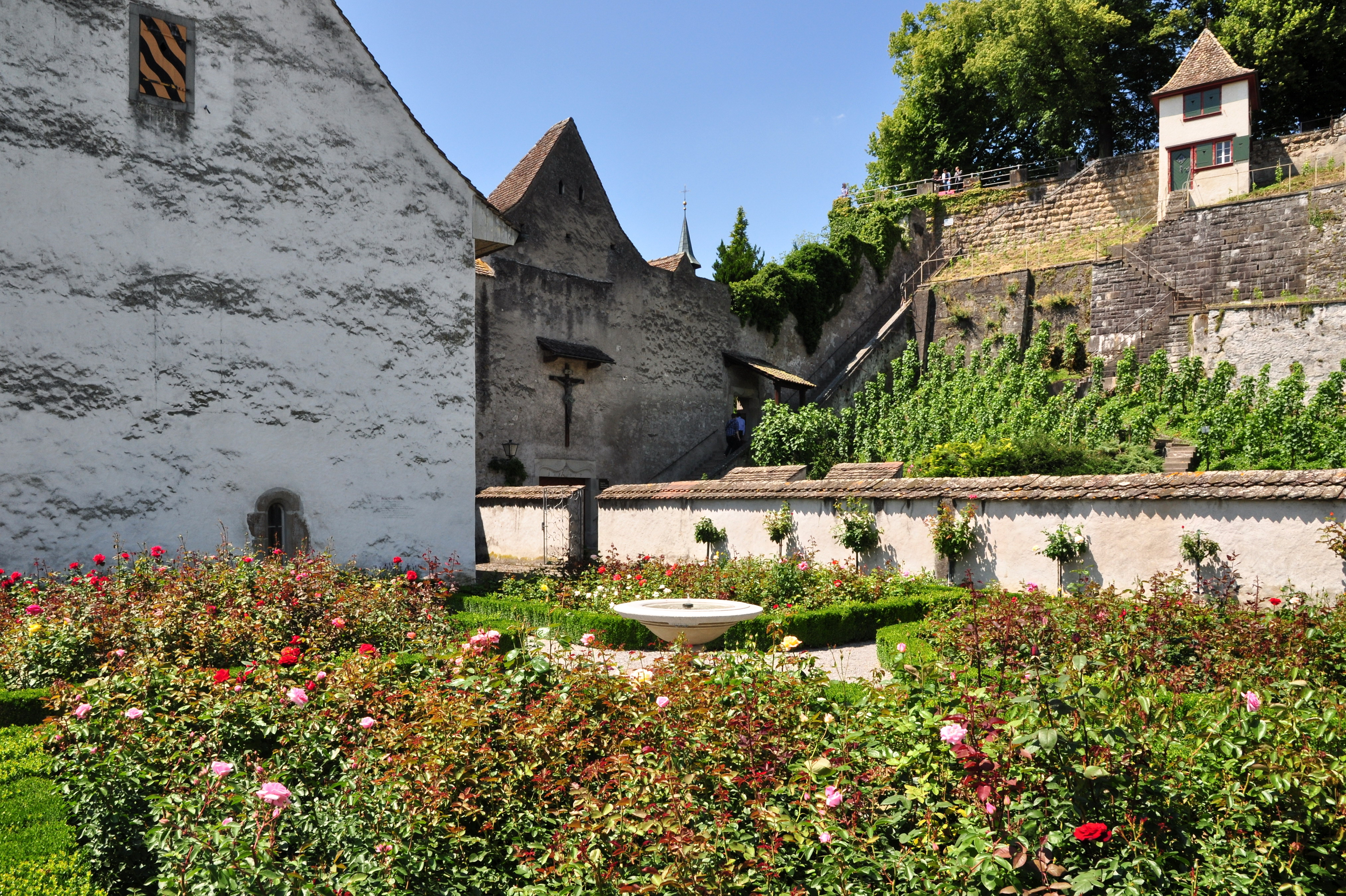
Rose gardens at Einsiedlerhaus

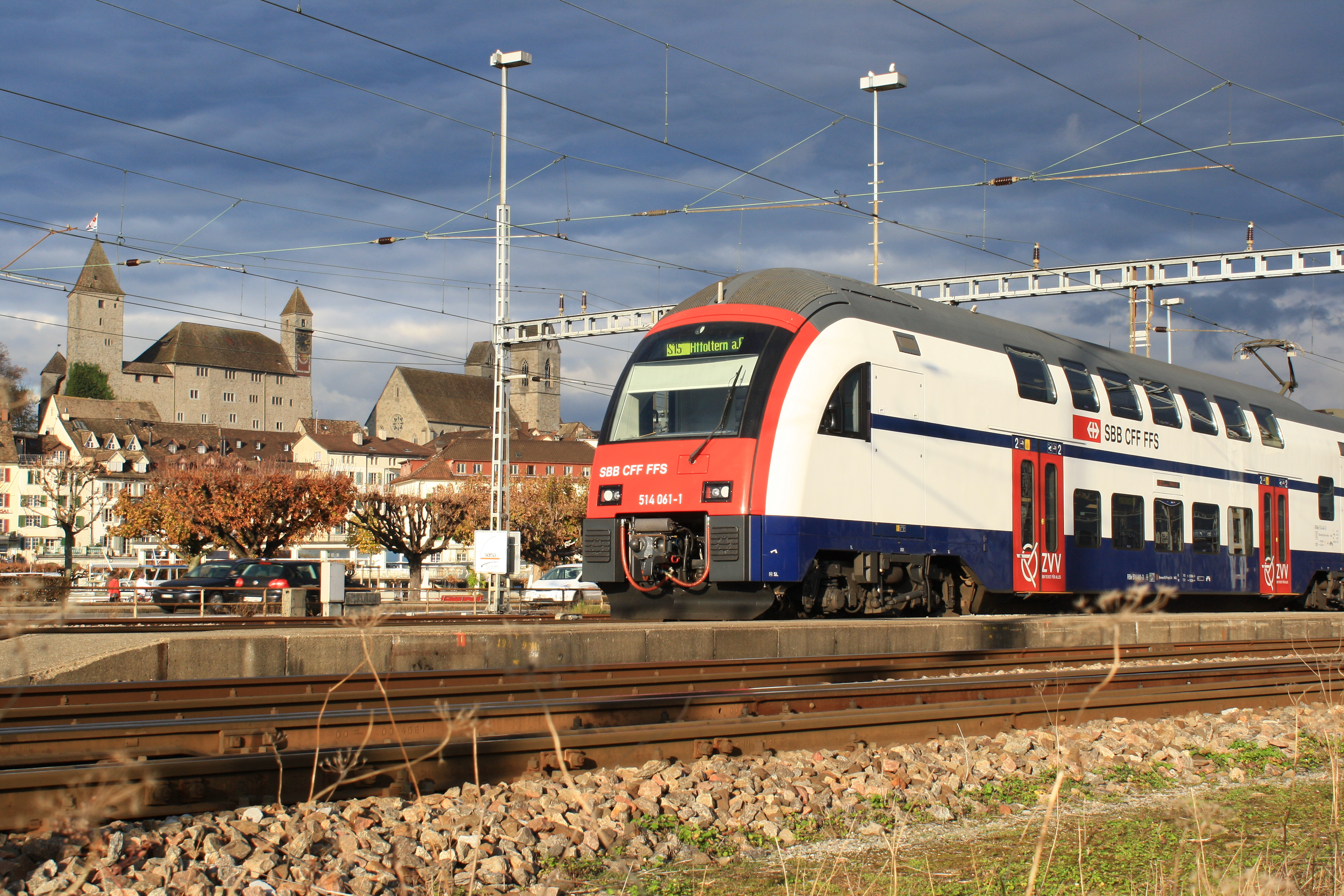
S-Bahn Zurich S15 line at Rapperswil railway station, Schloss Rapperswil and St. John's Church in the background

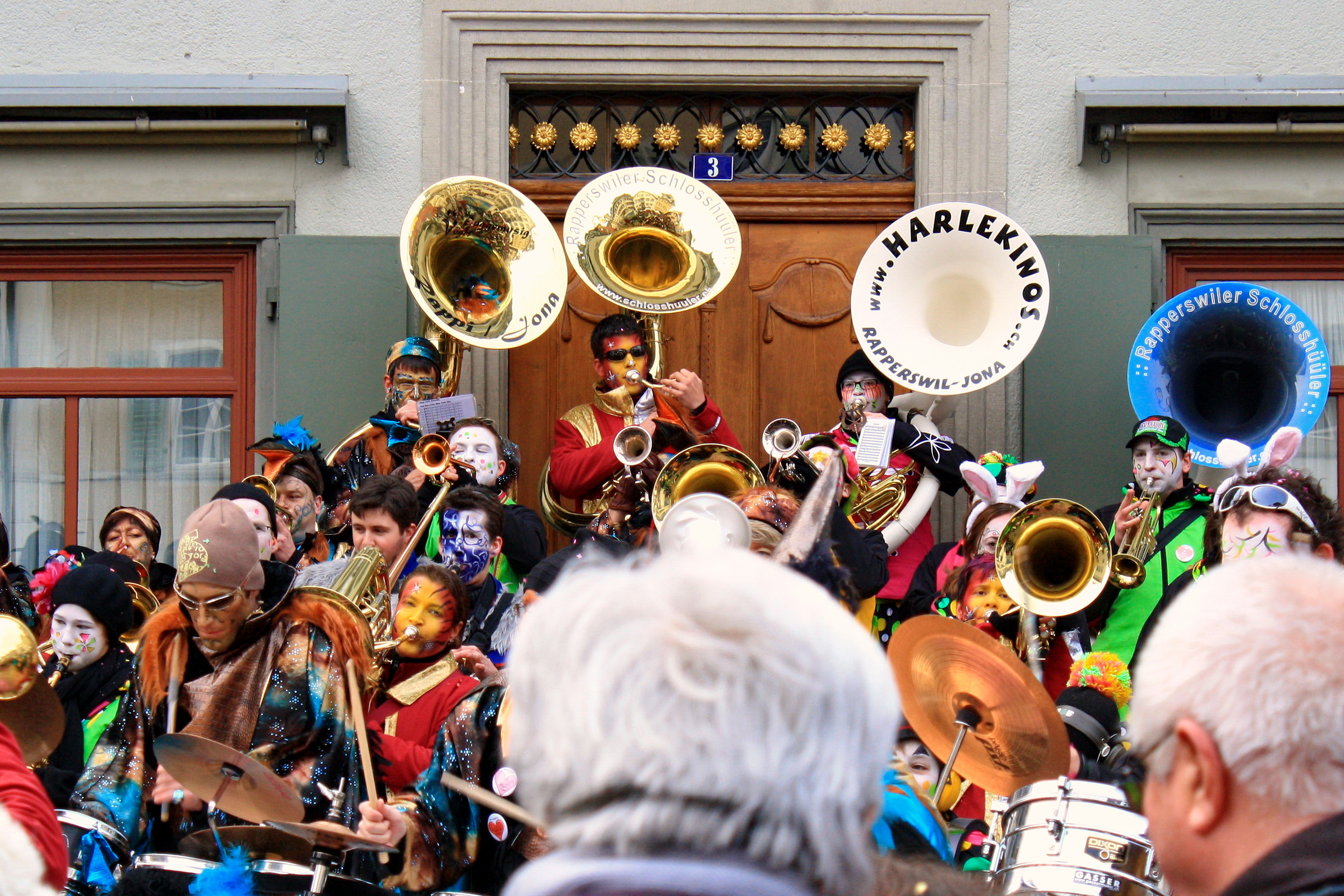
Guggenmusik concert (Eis-zwei-Geissebei)

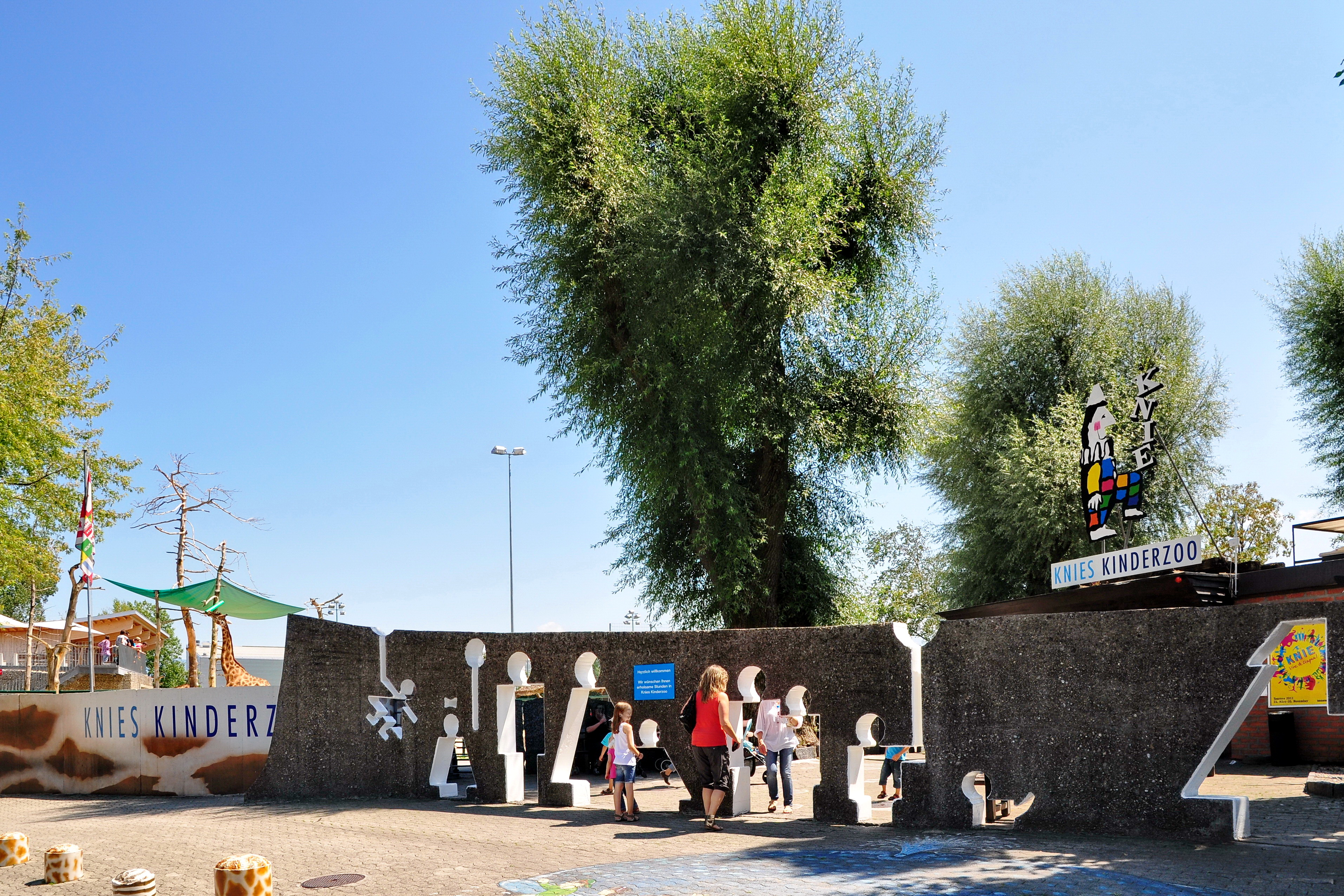
Knie's Kinderzoo

Settlements in the region of Rapperswil date back to at least 5000 years ago. Archaeological relicts have been found at the Technikum island settlement, and the remains of a first wooden bridge (1523 BC, reconstructed in 2001) to Hurden located on the Obersee lakeshore nearby the Technical University (HSR) respectively the so-called Heilig Hüsli at the northwestern part of the Seedamm area. The three neighbouring Prehistoric settlements, as well as the early lake crossings, are part of the UNESCO World Heritage Site Prehistoric Pile dwellings around the Alps. In Kempraten, two kilometers away, there was a probably Helvetic settlement; and in the beginning of the 1st century AD, the Roman vicus Centum Prata (meaning 100 meadows) became an important trade center on the way to the Roman heartland. The Neolithic bridge between Hurden and Rapperswil was renewed by the Romans at least around 165 AD.

Historians mention a 10th-century ferry station assumably at the so-called Einsiedlerhaus in Rapperswil – in 981 AD as well as the vineyard on the Lindenhof hill – between Kempraten on Kempratnerbucht, Lützelau and Ufenau island and assumably present Hurden, which allowed the pilgrims towards Einsiedeln to cross the lake before the prehistoric bridge at the Seedamm isthmus was re-built in 1358.

=== Counts of Rapperswil ===
Rapperswil Castle and the fortifications of the former locus Endingen (given by the Einsiedeln Abbey) were built by the Counts of Rapperswil, i.e. by Rudolf II and his son Rudolf III von Rapperswil around 1200: The town was founded when the nobility of Rapperswil moved from Altendorf across the lake to Rapperswil. On the peninsula at Oberbollingen, the St. Nicholas Chapel is mentioned, where around 1229 a small Cistercian (later Premonstratensian) monastery was established by the house of Rapperswil; in 1267 it was united with the nearby Mariazell-Wurmsbach Abbey. St. Martin Busskirch is one of the oldest churches around upper Lake Zürich. Even the citizens of Rapperswil had to attend services in Busskirch until Count Rudolf II built the Stadtpfarrkirche on Herrenberg next to Rapperswil Castle on Lindenhof hill. Known members of the family are Countess Elisabeth von Rapperswil (around 1252/62 –1309), her sons Wernher von Homberg, Reichsvogt and minnesang poet, and Count Johann I. von Habsburg-Laufenburg-Rapperswil (* around 1295/97, † 1337). His son Johann II († 1380), the opposition's leader against Rudolf Brun, the mayor of Zürich, was arrested for two years, and the town walls of Rapperswil, its castle and Altendorf castle were destroyed by Brun in 1350.

=== Modern history ===
Between 1358 and 1360 Rudolf IV, Duke of Austria, built a wooden bridge across the lake that has been used to 1878 – measuring approximately 1,450 metres (4,757 ft) in length and 4 metres (13 ft) wide; 546 oak piles have been installed. In 1415, the town bought freedom for itself. In 1442, during Old Zurich War, Rapperswil was in alliance with Zürich and the Habsburg Dynasty. In 1458 Rapperswil was controlled by the Swiss Confederation as a so-called Gemeine Herrschaft, i.e. under control of two cantons (Glarus and Schwyz) of the Old Swiss Confederation and their representative, a Vogt at Rapperswil castle.

Because of its strategic location along important infrastructure lines, and because of flourishing trade, the town grew rich. This allowed a certain degree of freedom (especially within the Habsburg-controlled territories and) within the Swiss Confederation which ended with the formation of the Swiss cantons by Napoleon in 1799. In 1656 and 1712 (the First War of Villmergen and the Toggenburg War, or Second War of Villmergen, respectively), Rapperswil was involved in wars between the Catholic and Reformed cantons of the Old Swiss Confederation. Rapperswil was at first part of the Helvetic and the canton of Linth's capital city. After the 1803 Act of Mediation, it joined the canton of St. Gallen, and the former Herrschaft Rapperswil was split into the municipalities of Rapperswil and Jona.

On 1 January 2007 the former municipalities of Rapperswil and Jona merged to form a new political entity: Rapperswil-Jona has a population of 28,454 (January 2026). This makes it the second-largest town in the canton after the capital of St. Gallen itself.

== Culture ==
Ironman 70.3 Switzerland and the Triathlon Challenge took place in Rapperswil-Jona on 6 June 2010, and was repeated several times. The blues'n'jazz festival, taking place since 1998, is held at the end of June. Every three years Seenachtsfest is celebrated one weekend in August, attracting nearly 100,000 visitors to a spectacular fireworks, for the next time in summer 2029. Rapperswil is the home of the Rapperswil-Jona Lakers, and their St.Galler Kantonalbank Arena is situated on Obersee lakeshore. Kunst(Zeug)Haus is a vibrant center of Swiss contemporary art, housed in a former Swiss Military armory (Zeughaus). Herzbaracke is a swimming theatre, cabaret and restaurant on Lake Zürich at different locations, among them Zürich-Bellevue and Rapperswil harbour. Eis-zwei-Geissebei is a Carnival festival in Rapperswil on Shrove Tuesday, and Christkindlymärt is a Christmas funfair celebrated in late December, and last but not least, Radio Zürisee is situated in Rapperswil opposite of the Rapperswil railway station, and Obersee Nachrichten at Hauptplatz plaza.

In Rapperswil there are several sites situated that are listed as Swiss heritage sites of national significance: Schloss Rapperswil with the Polish Museum including the Polish national archive, the medieval Rathaus (town hall) located at the Hauptplatz square, and the Seedamm region including Heilig Hüsli and the remains of the prehistoric wooden bridges respectively the neolithic stilt house settlements located there. The latter are part of the UNESCO World Heritage Site "Prehistoric Pile dwellings around the Alps".

== Cultural heritage ==
Located at the Seedamm isthmus in Lake Zurich, the area is in close vicinity to the prehistoric lake crossings discovered at the Hurden Rosshorn site. One Prehistoric pile dwelling settlement, Rapperswil-Jona–Technikum, was located on a former island and directly linked to these sea crossings. The Feldbach settlement was located at a 3 km footwalk distance to the north and the west. The Hurden Seefeld settlement was located close to the other end of the sea crossings, on the Hurden side. Because the lake has grown in size over time, the original piles are now around 4 metres (13 ft) to 7 metres (23 ft) under the water level of 406 metres (1,332 ft).

As well as being part of the 56 Swiss sites of the UNESCO World Heritage Site Prehistoric pile dwellings around the Alps, the settlements are also listed in the Swiss inventory of cultural property of national and regional significance as Class A objects of national importance.

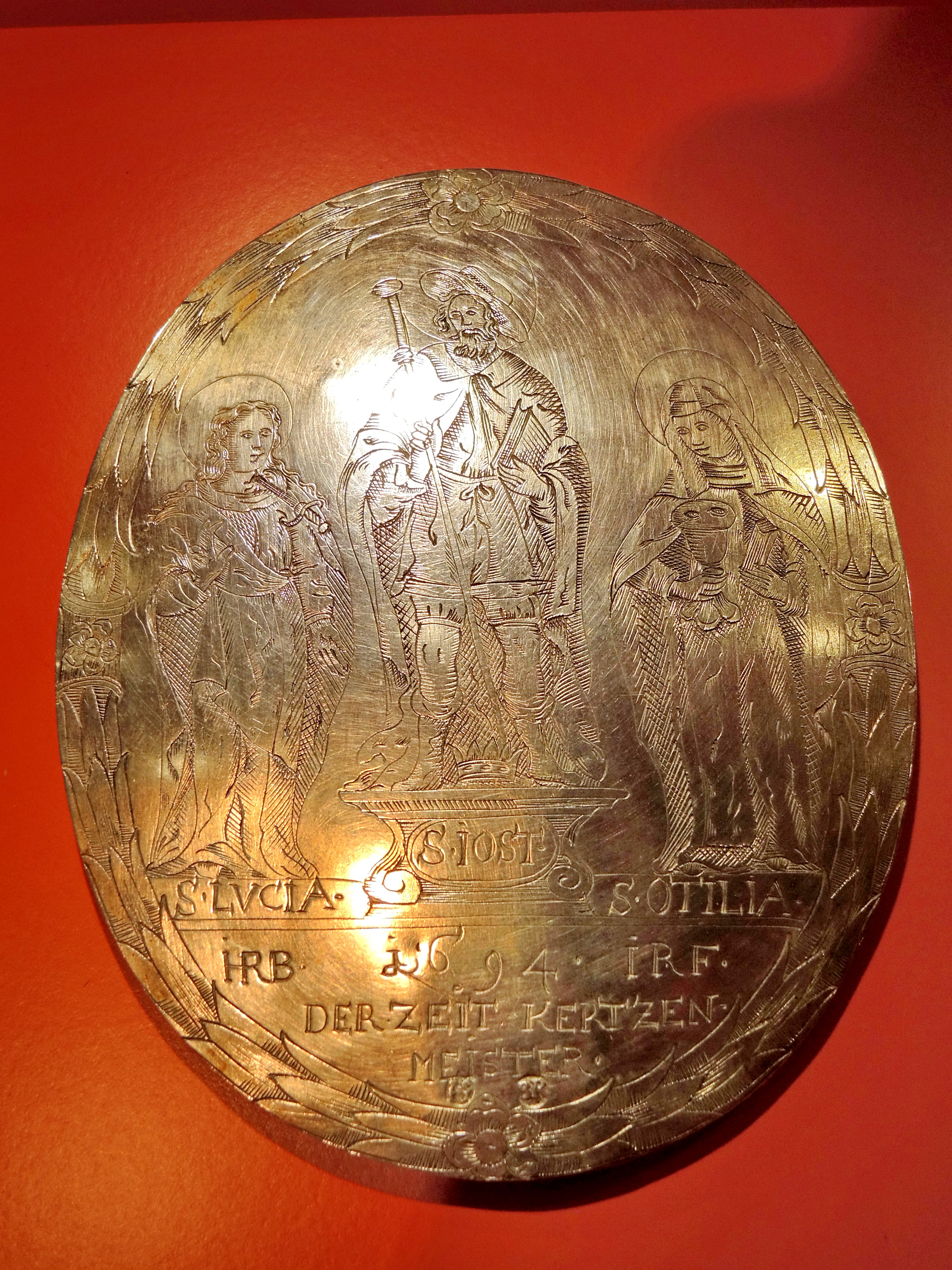
Silverware (1694) of St John the Baptist church's treasury. Collection of the Stadtmuseum of Rapperswil

== Transportation ==
Rapperswil is a nodal point of the IR Voralpen Express (VAE) of SOB, the Zurich S-Bahn lines S5, S7, S15 and S40, and the St. Gallen S-Bahn lines S4, S6 and S17. This railway station is a 36-minute (S5/S15, combined quarter-hourly service) ride away from Zürich Hauptbahnhof and a 48-minute ride away from St. Gallen with the VAE (or 56 min with the S4), which provide a combined half-hourly service. The VAE also provides a direct link to Lucerne. The railway tracks and the infrastructure, excluded the train station's building, have been renewed by June/July 2016.

The harbour is located adjacent to Rapperswil railway station and served by regular boat lines of ZSG. Boats run to/from Zurich and other lakeside towns.

Since 2008, the bus service in Rapperswil-Jona (Stadtbus Rapperswil-Jona) has been provided by the Verkehrsbetriebe Zürichsee und Oberland (VZO). In addition, Schneider Busbetrieb operates line 622 to Wagen (continues to St. Gallenkappel/Wattwil) and line 621 to Buech/St. Dyonis.

As of 2016, an average of 26,000 road vehicles cross the Seedamm causeway and the Bahnhofstrasse road in Rapperswil every day. As of 30 June 2016, Rapperswil-Jona is expected to participate as the first Swiss city in a pilot project for so-called Mobility pricing in order to relieve the traffic on road and rail during rush hours.

== Gallery ==
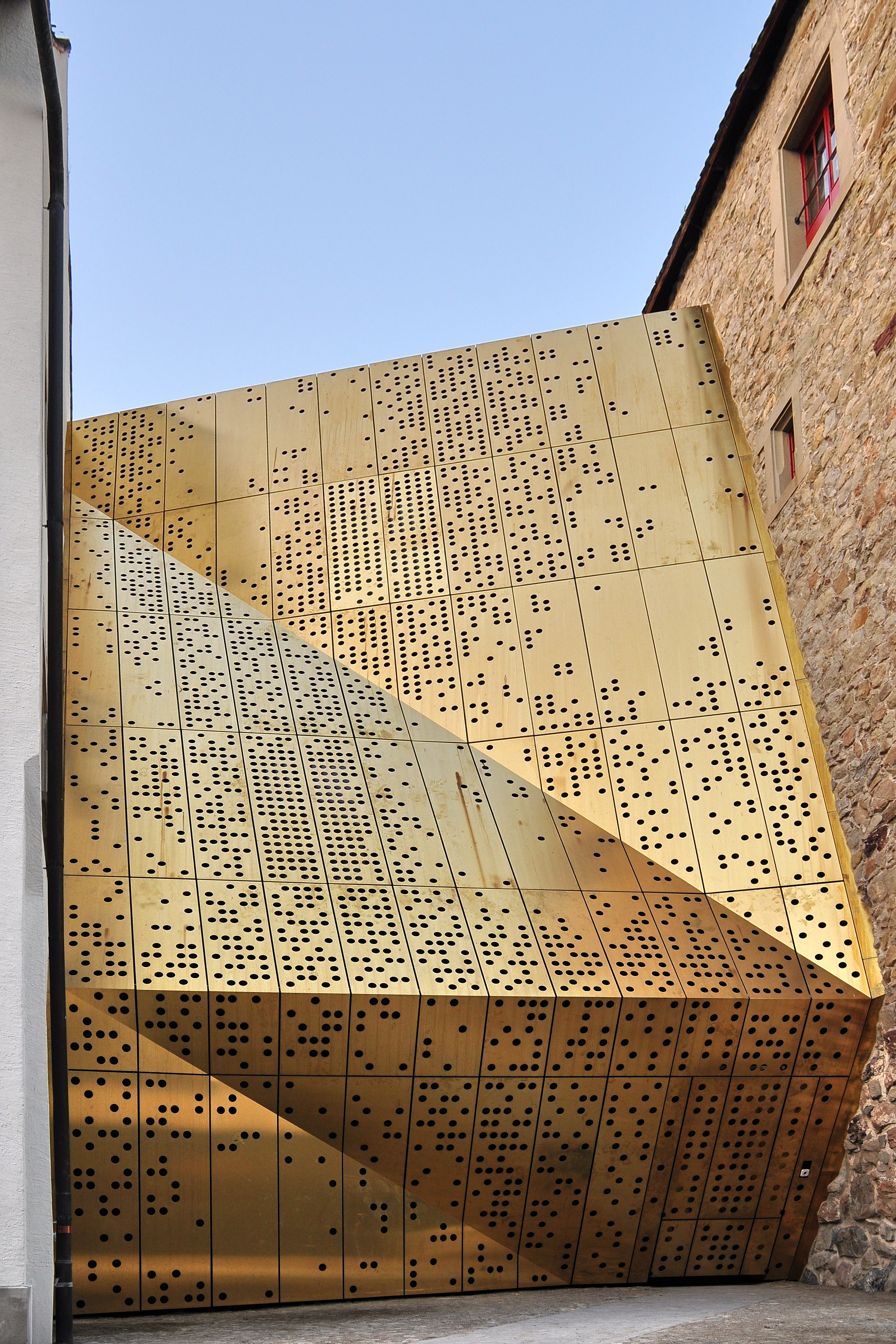
Stadtmuseum Rapperswil

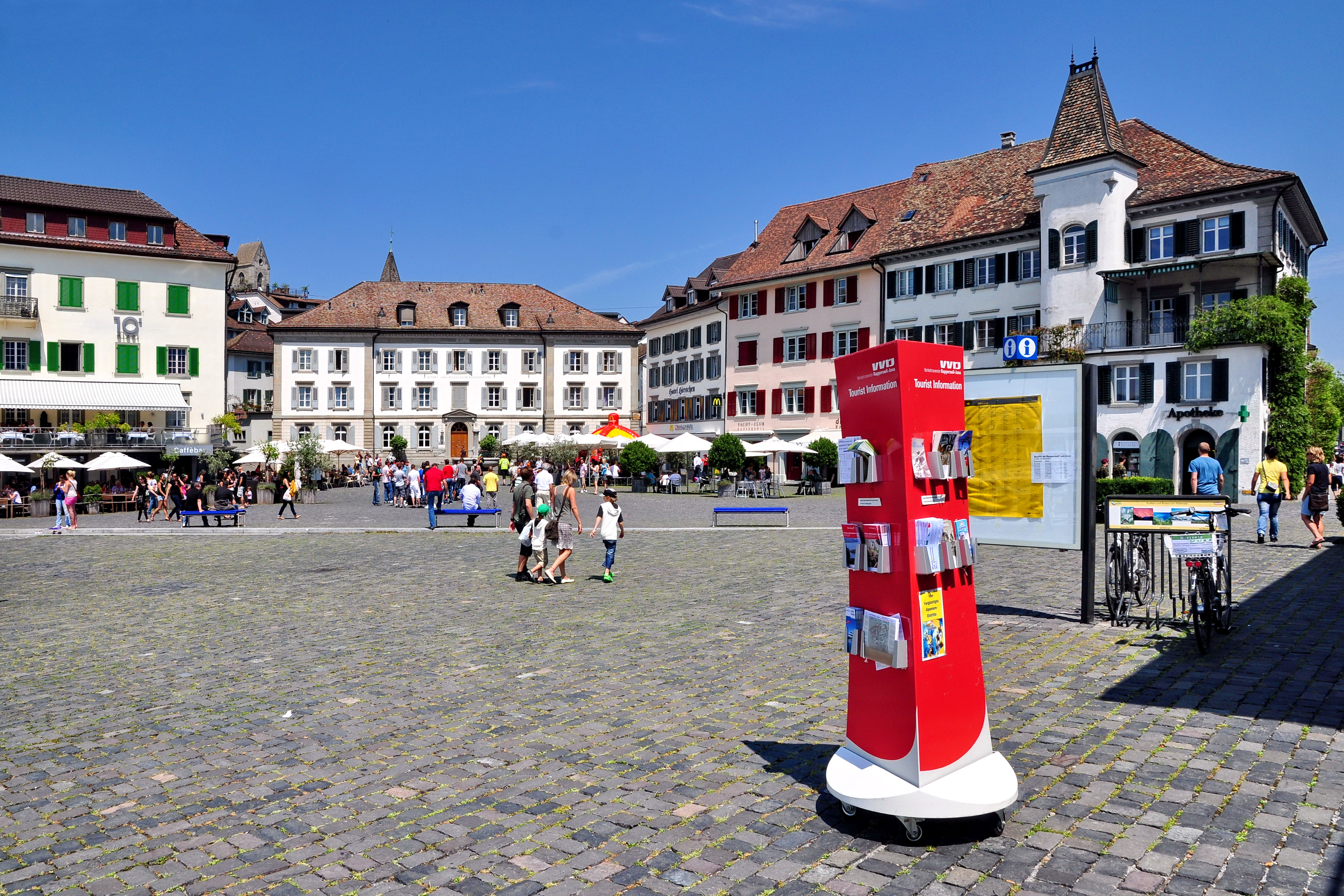
Fischmarktplatz

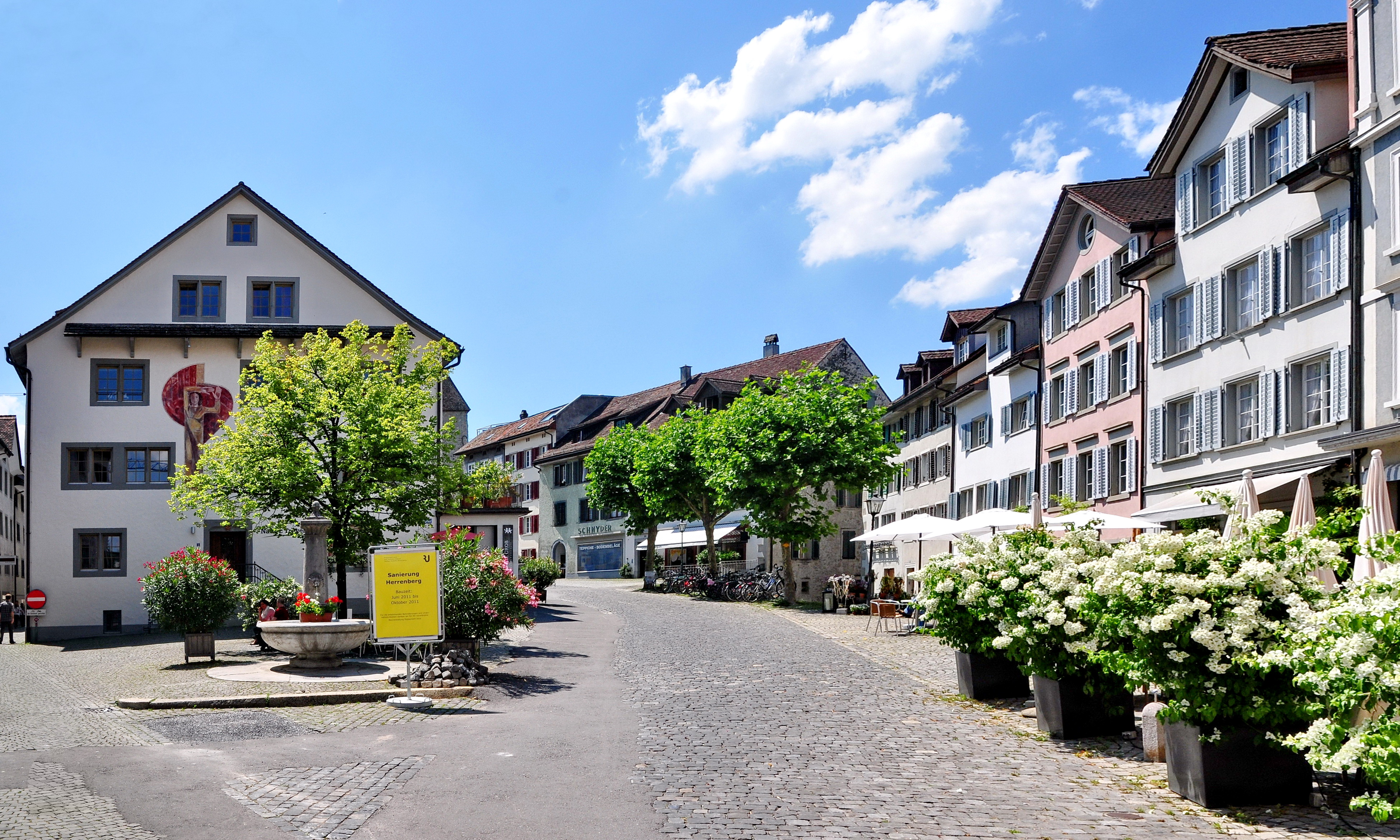
Engelplatz

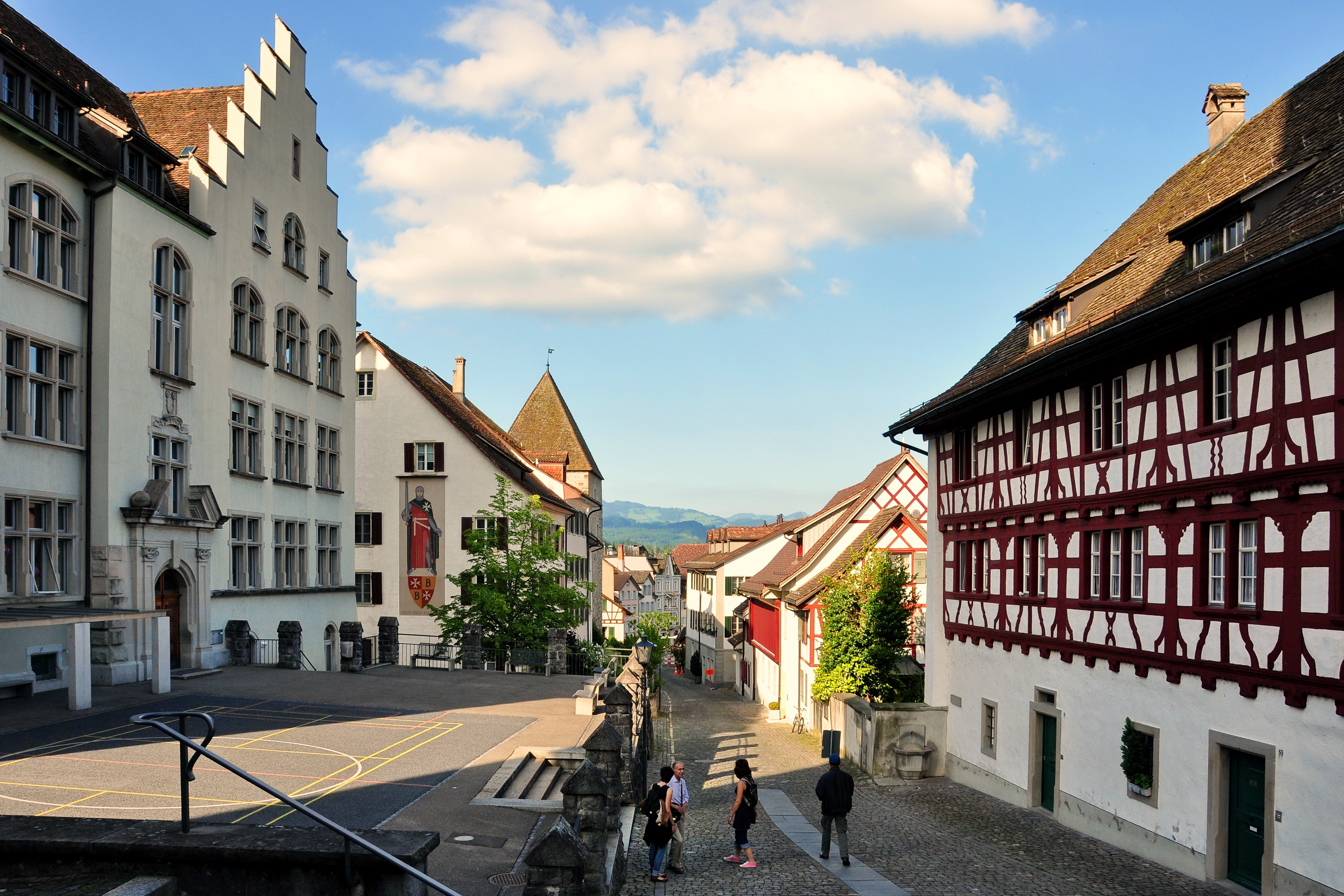
Herrenberg

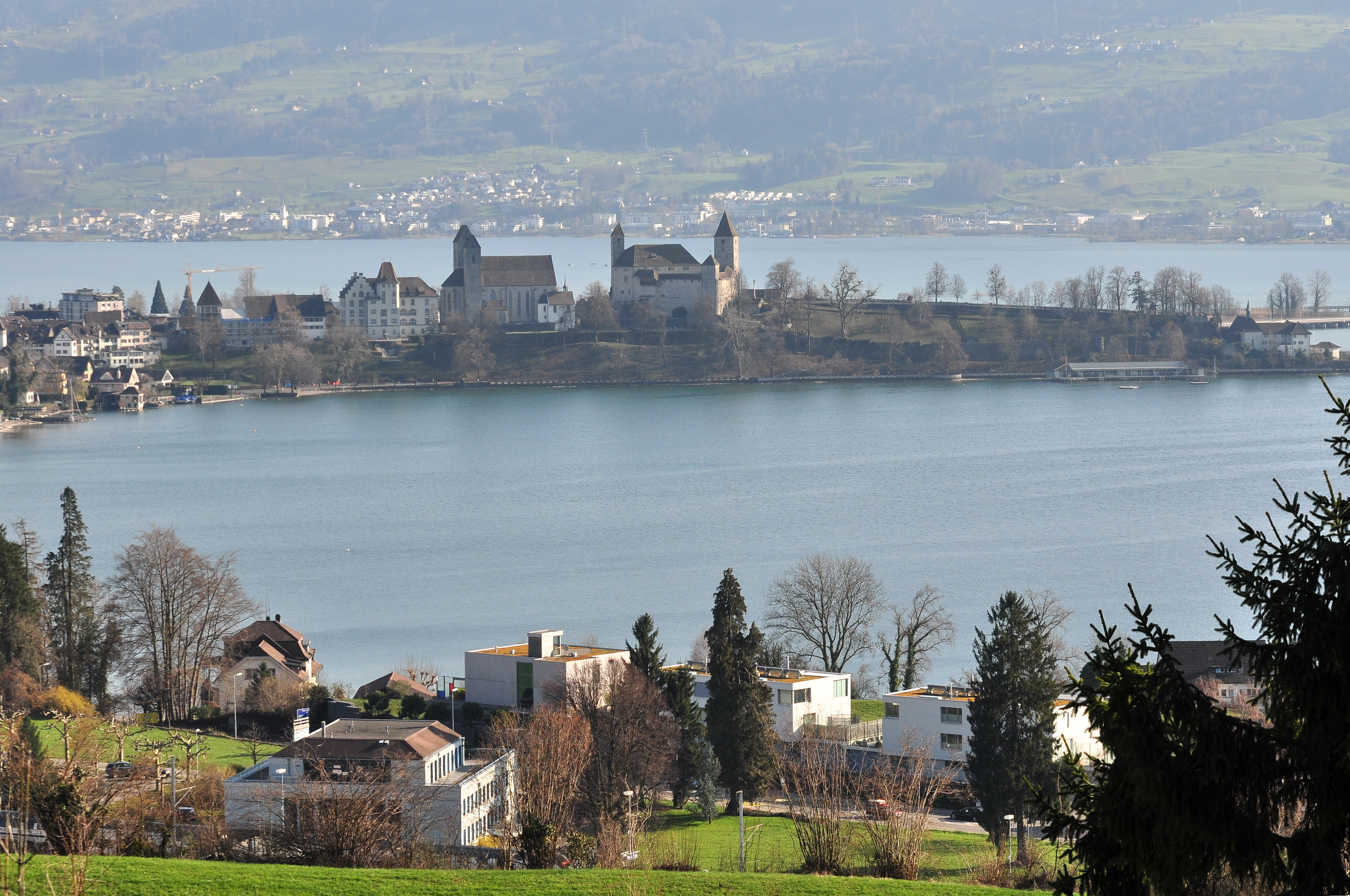
Stadtmuseum Rapperswil, Liebfrauenkapelle, Stadtpfarrkirche St. Johann (St. John's church) and the Schloss, as seen from Kempraten-Lenggis

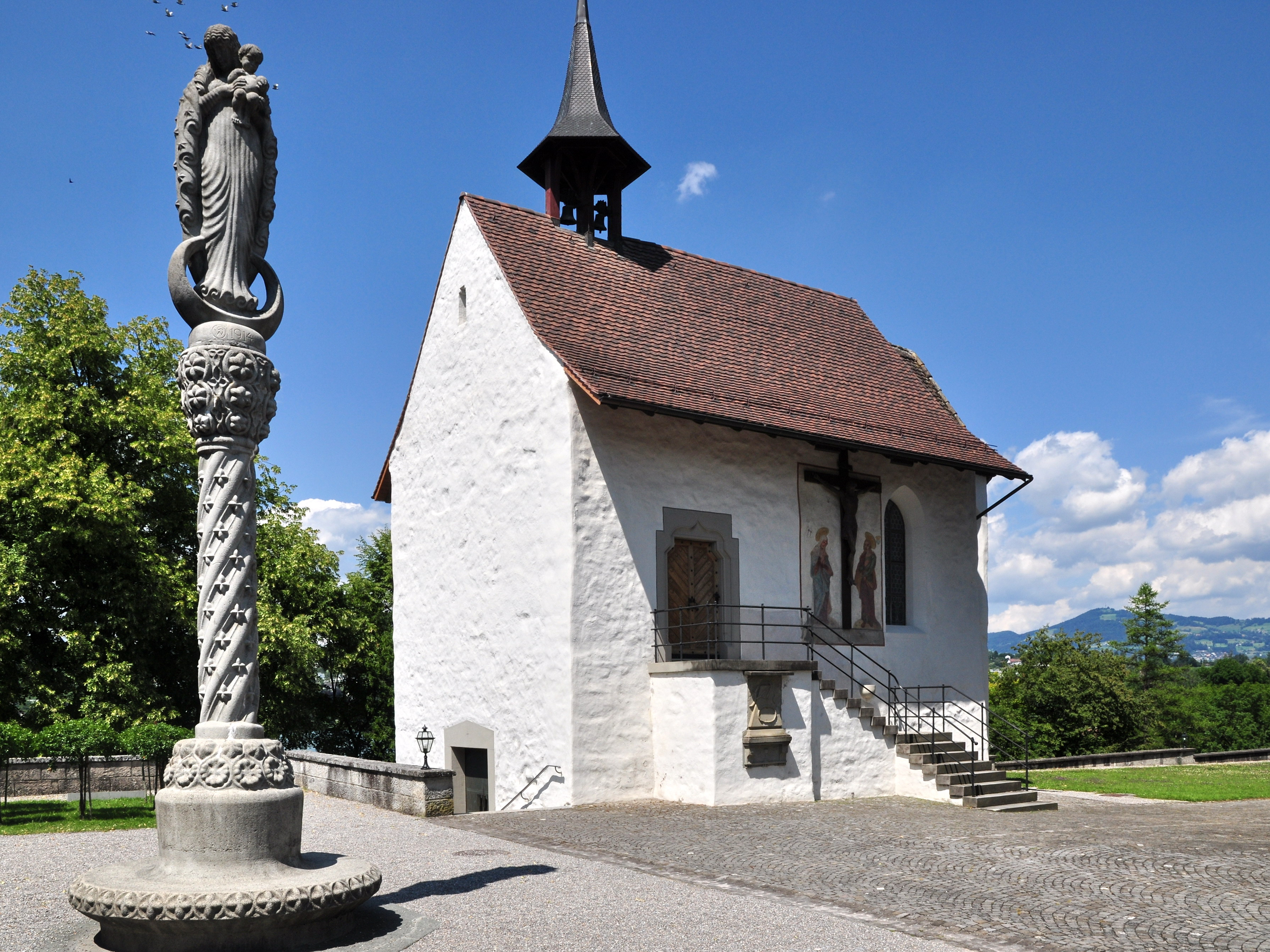
Liebfrauenkapelle (St Mary's church) between Schloss and Stadtpfarrkirche

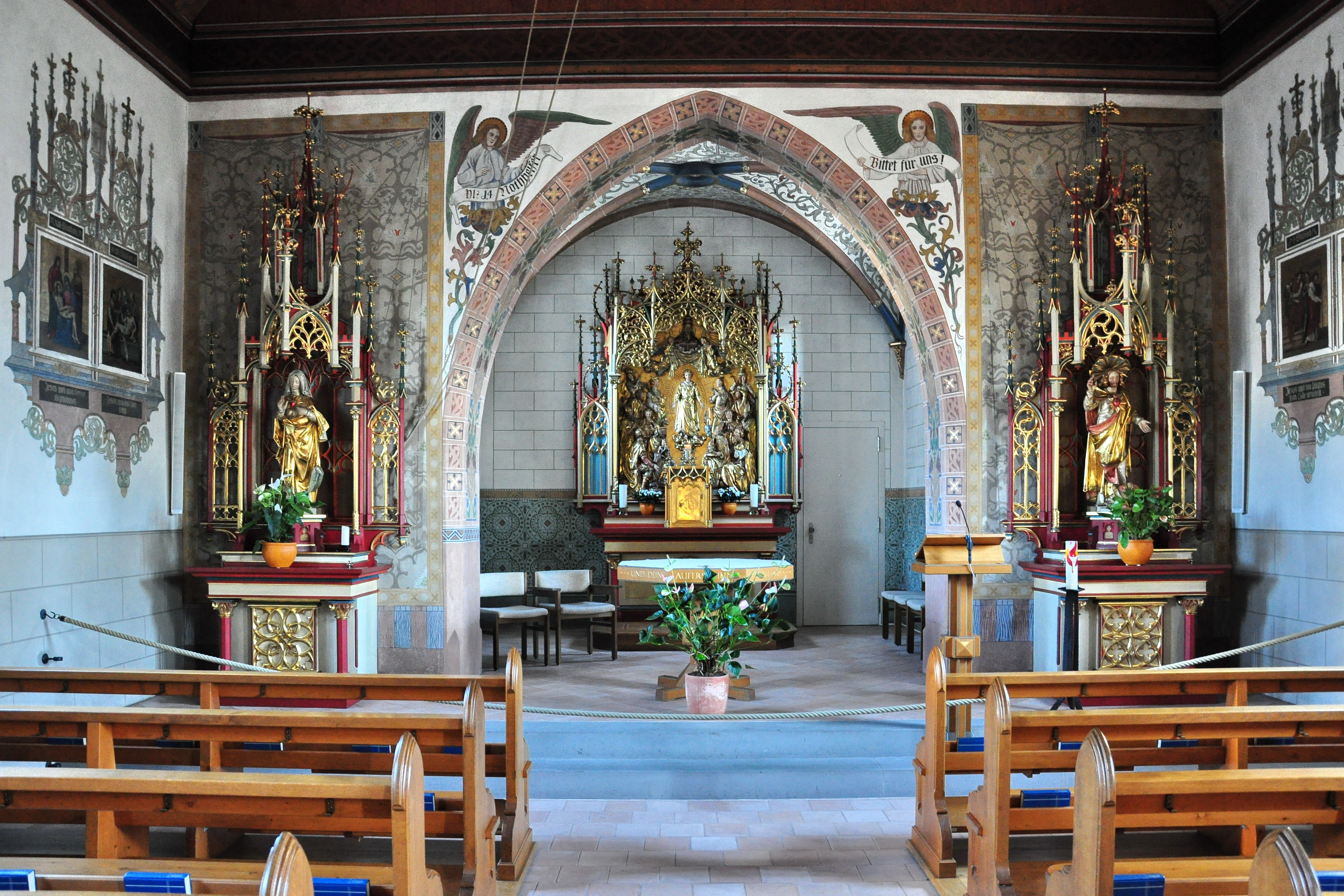
St. Ursula chappel (re-built in 1607)

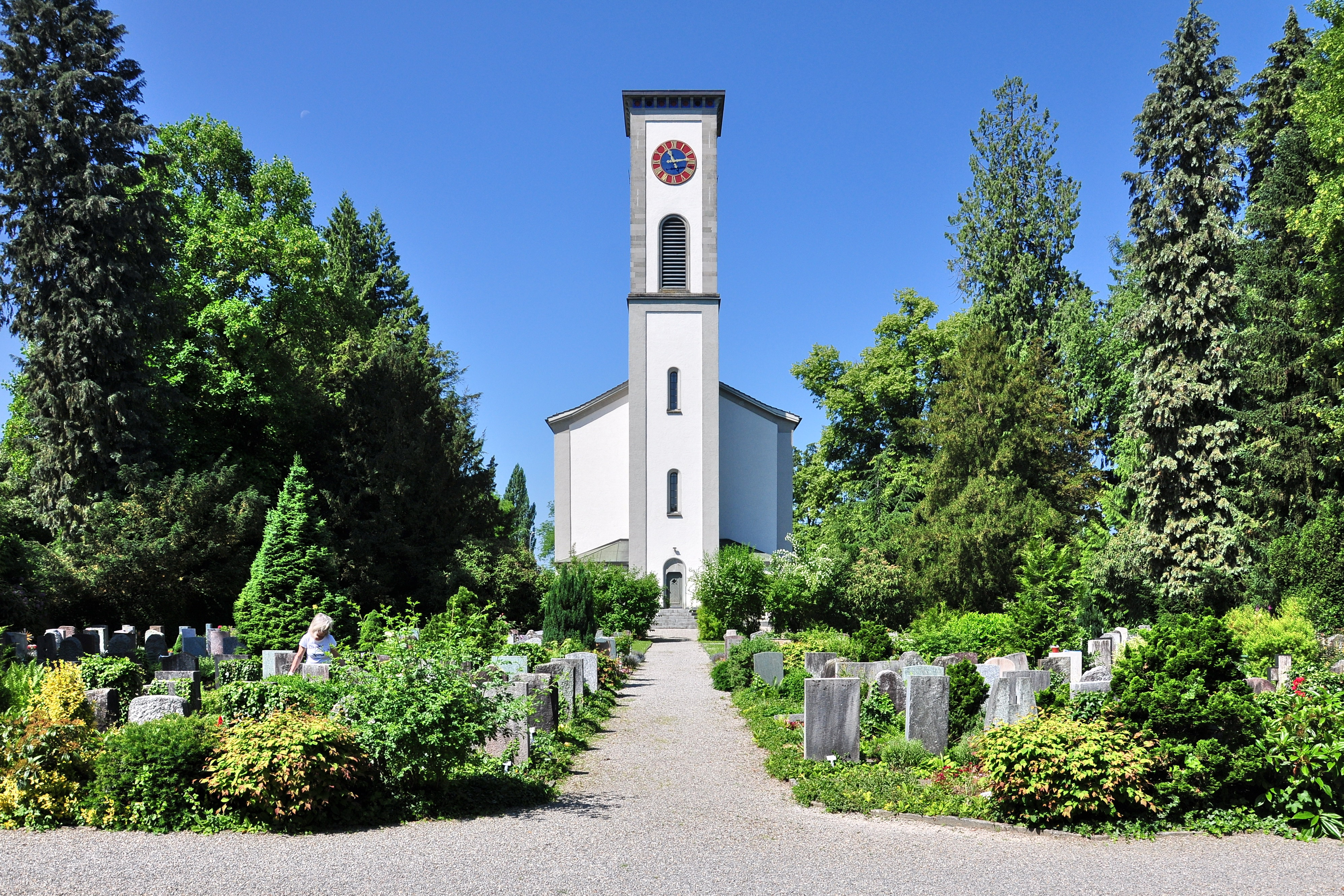
Reformierte Kirche (built in 1841)

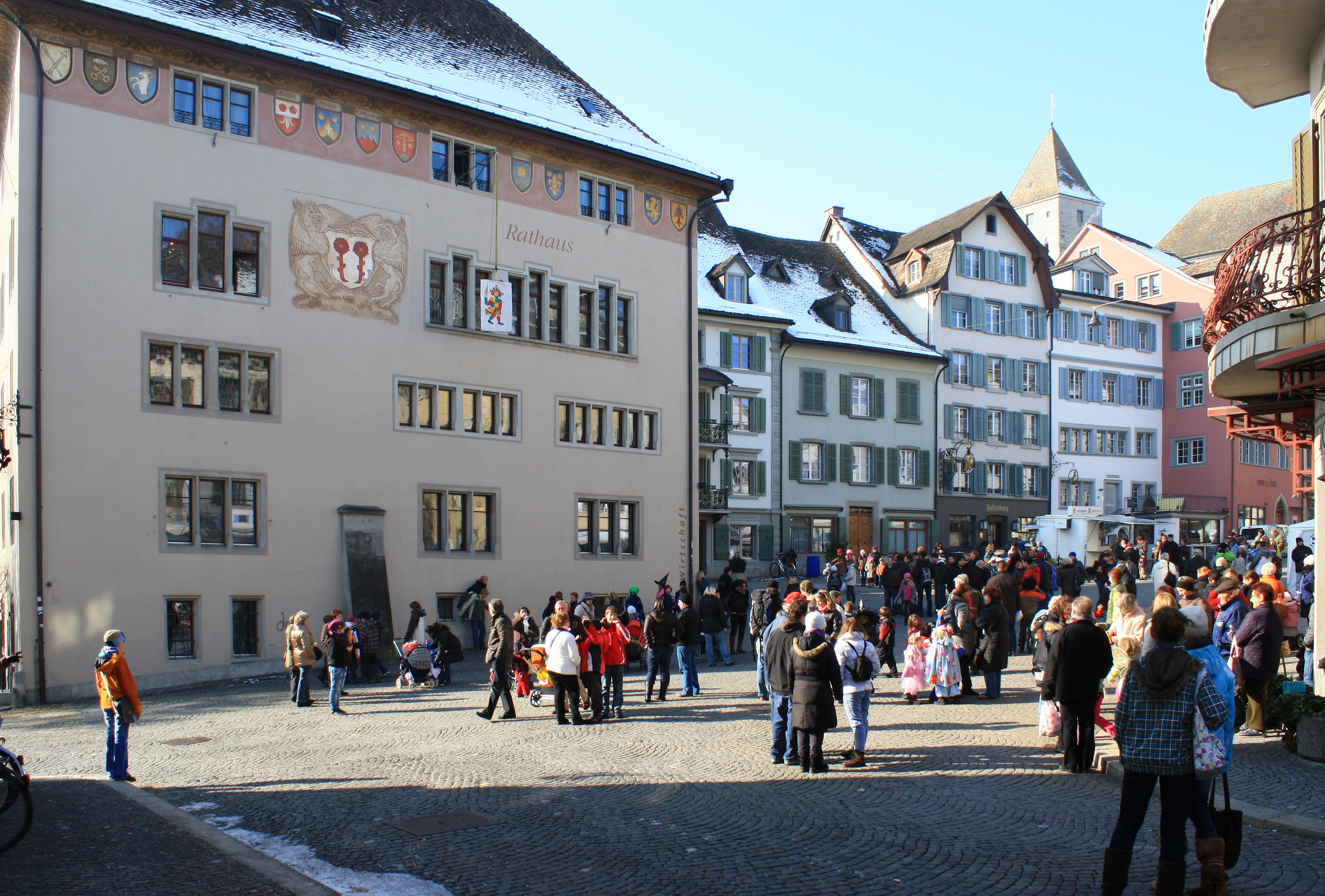
Eis-zwei-Geissebei on the main square at Rathaus Rapperswil (townhall)

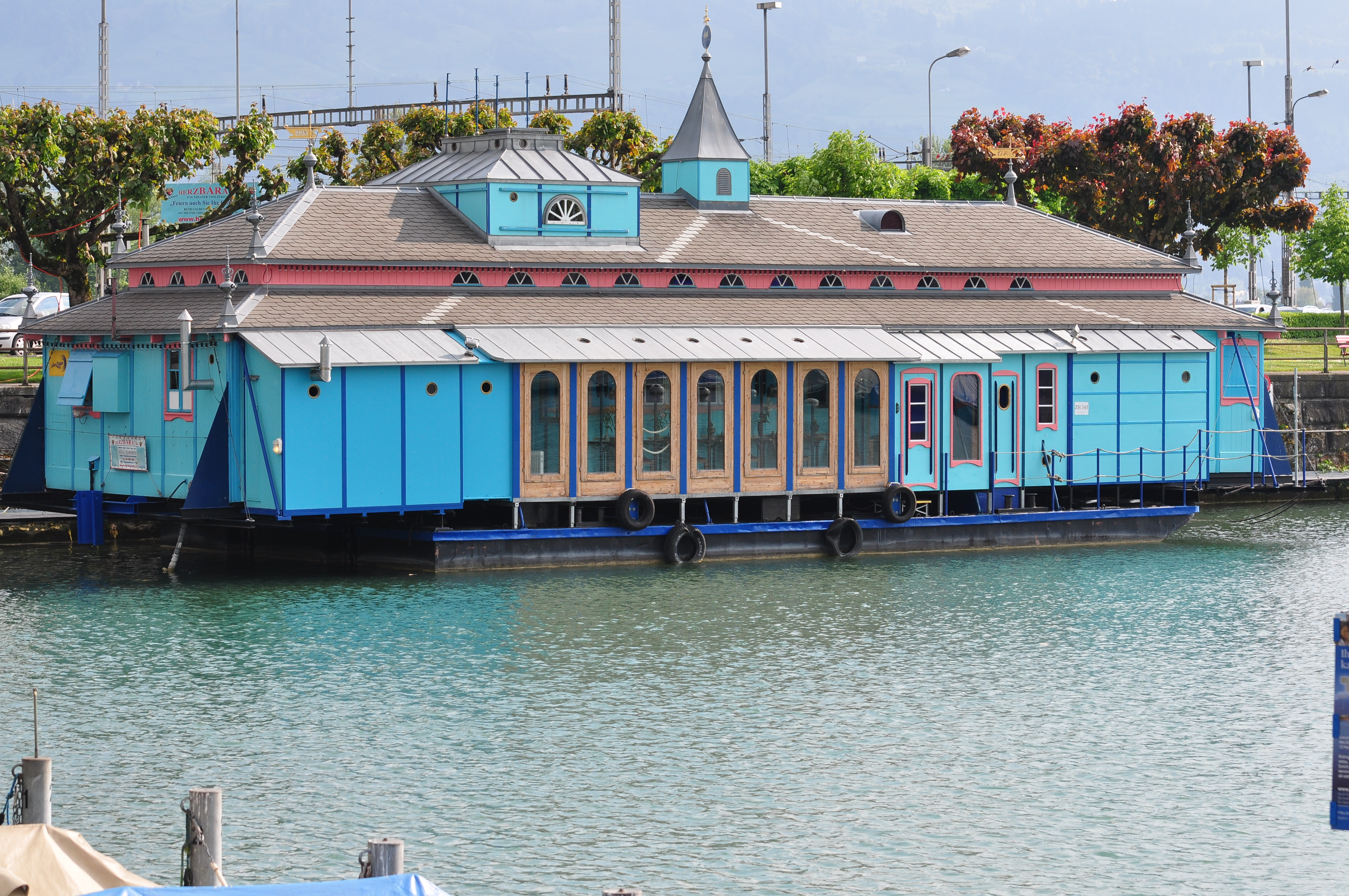
Herzbaracke cabaret-theater at Rapperswil harbour

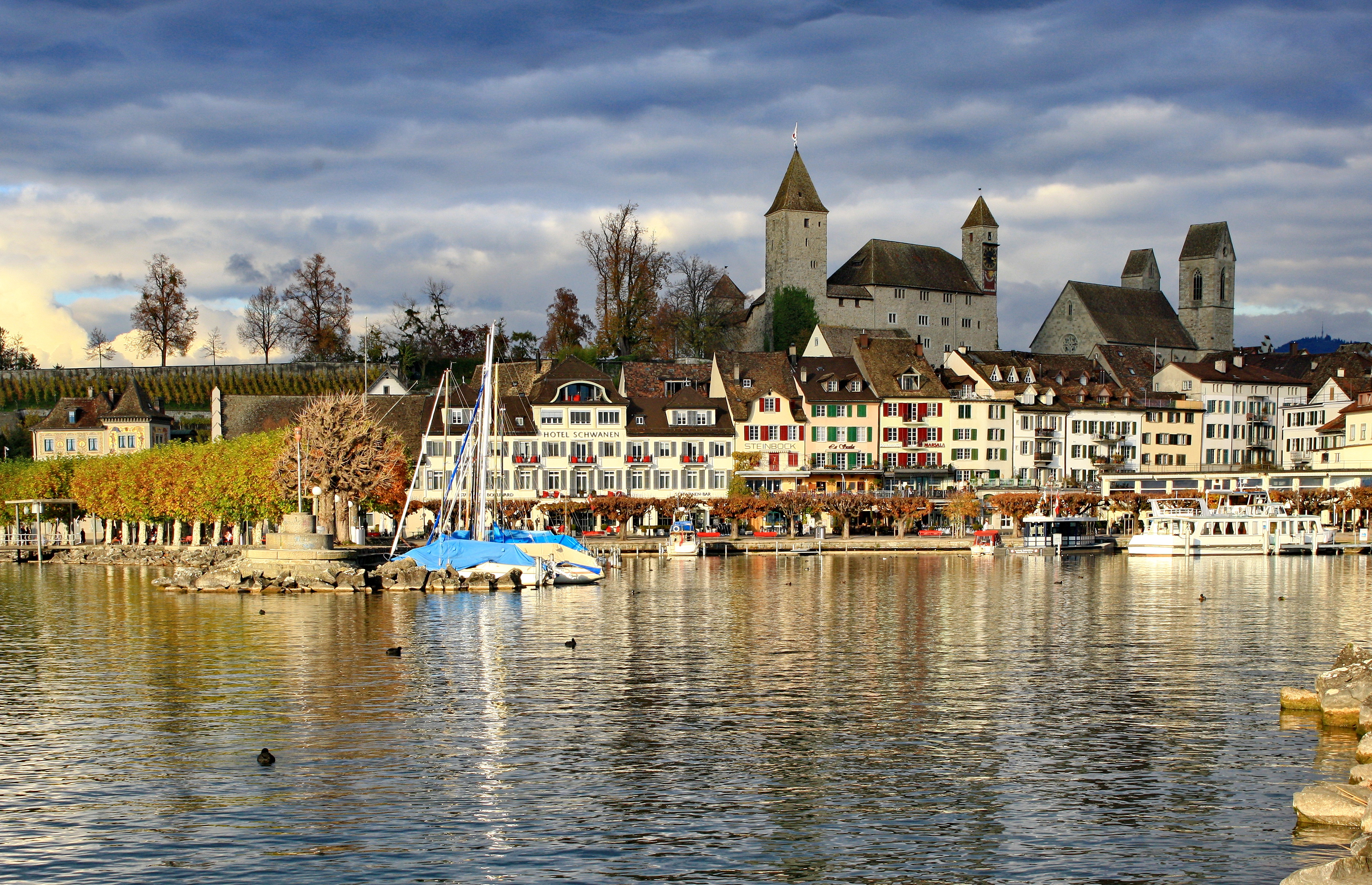
See-Quai in Rapperswil, Bühlerallee to the left, Lindenhof hill in the background

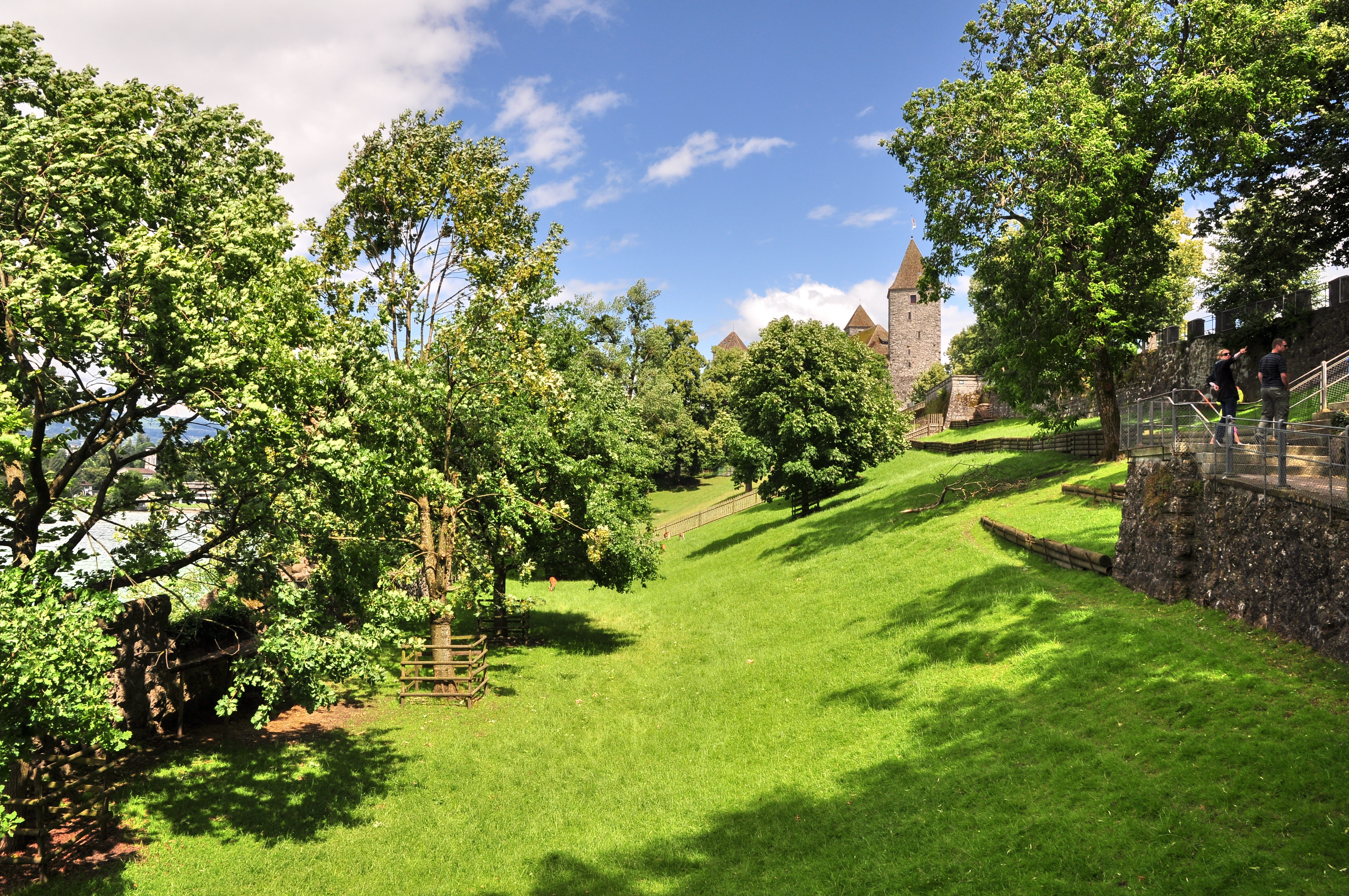
Lindenhof and Deer park towards to the Schloss

== Personalities ==
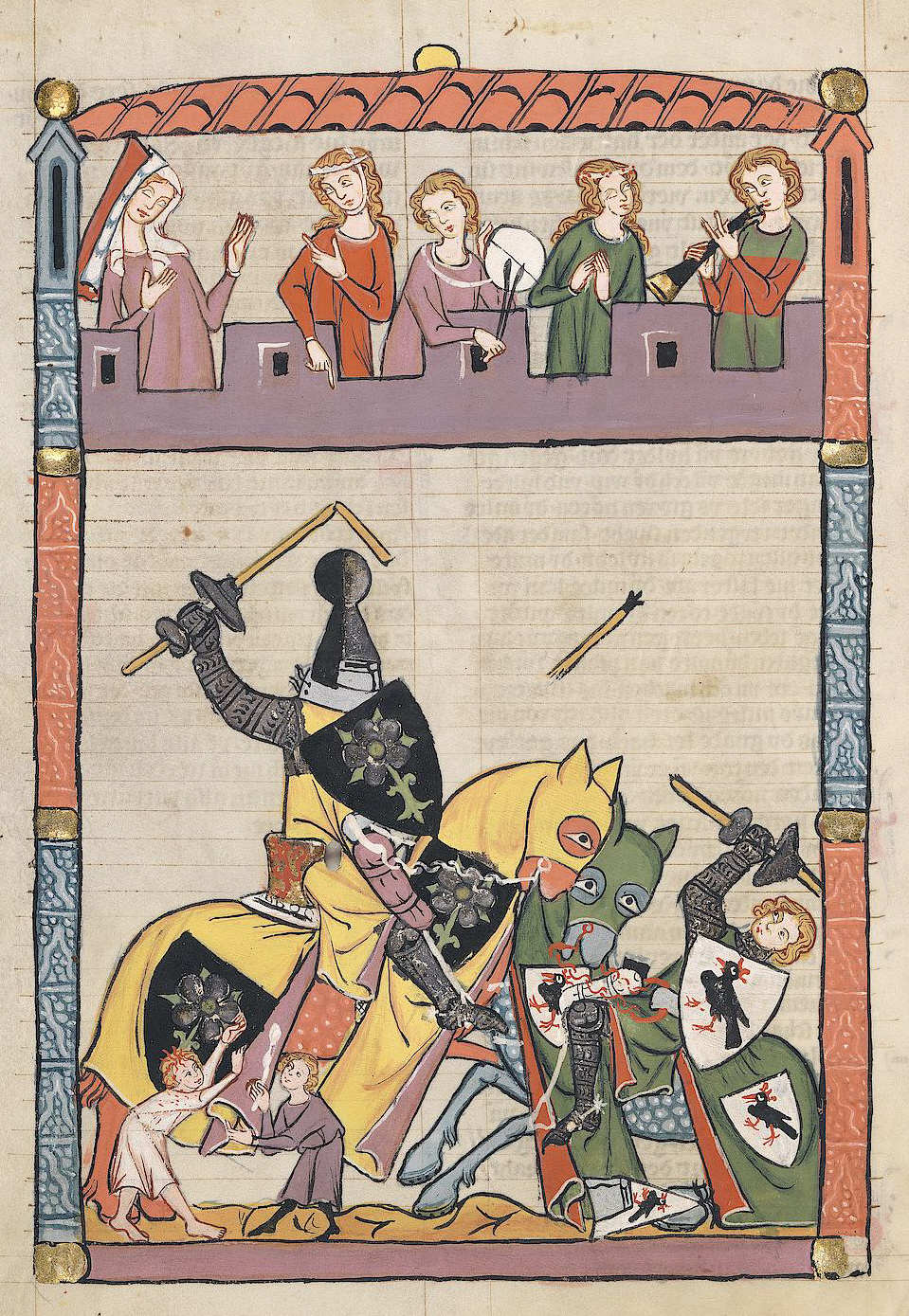
Codex Manesse, Albrecht von Rapperswil, c.1340

Early times

- (Saint) Kunigunde of Rapperswil died in early 4th century AD, a Christian saint, beatified 1504
- Elisabeth von Rapperswil (c.1251 – 1309) the last countess of the House of Rapperswil
- Albrecht von Rapperswil (13th century) one of the Minnesingers featured in the Codex Manesse
- Wernher von Homberg (1284–1320) a knight in the service of Henry VII, Holy Roman Emperor
- Count Johann I (Habsburg-Laufenburg) (c.1297–1337), son of Countess Elisabeth von Rapperswil
- Count Johann II (Habsburg-Laufenburg) (c.1330 – 1380), son of Johann I

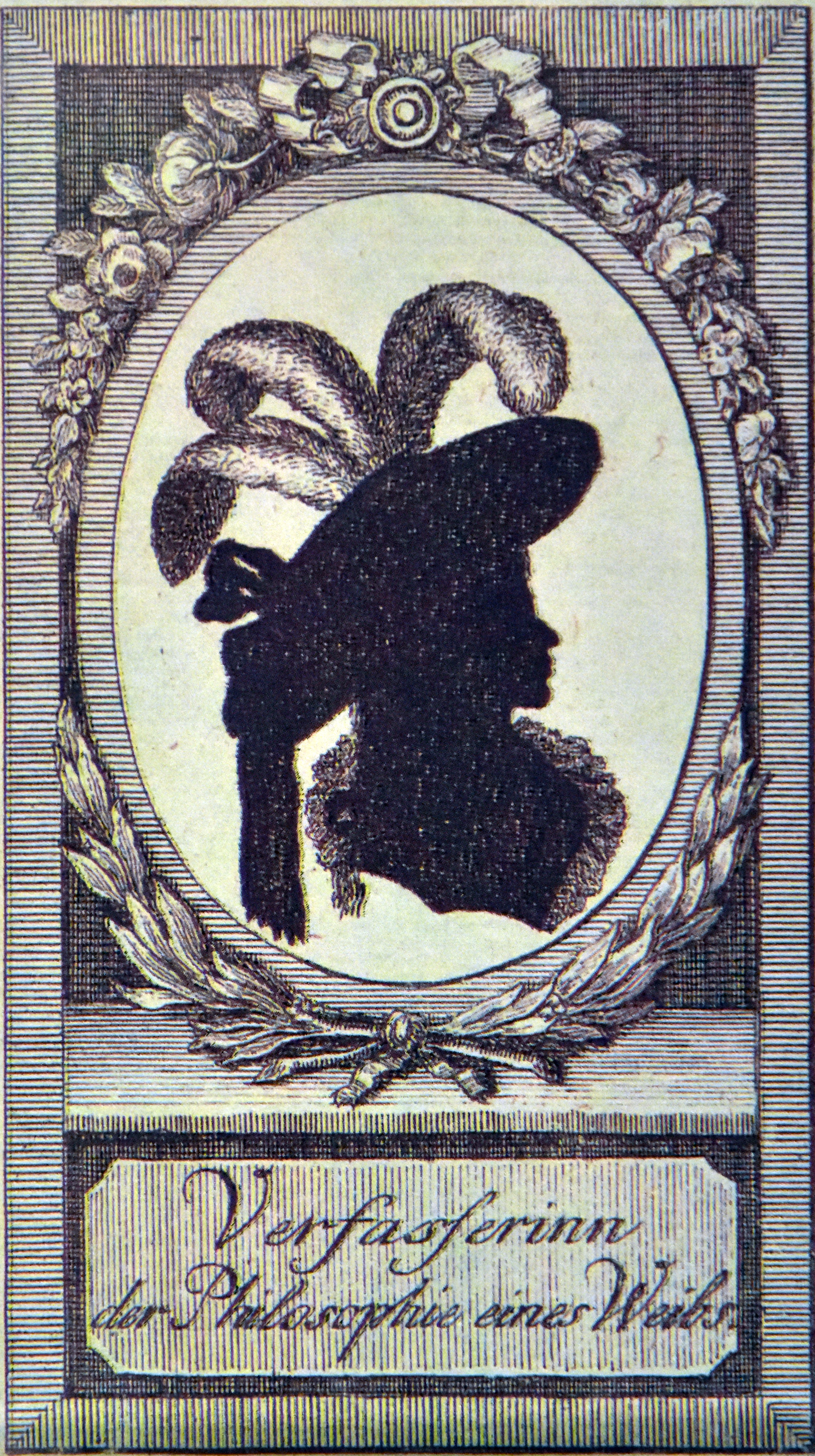
Marianne Ehrmann, 1789

Modern times

- Valentin Molitor (1637–1713) a composer and Benedictine monk
- Marianne Ehrmann (1755–1795) early woman novelist, publicist and journalist
- Felix Maria Diogg (1762–1834) a painter and Swiss Classicism portraitist
- Count Wladyslaw Plater (1808–1889) a Polish count, in 1870 co-founded the Polish Museum, Rapperswil
- Joachim Raff (1822–1882) a German-Swiss composer, teacher and pianist
- Agaton Giller (1831–1887) a Polish historian, journalist and politician; co-founded the Polish Museum, Rapperswil
- Alwina Gossauer (1841–1926) one of the first Swiss women professional photographers
- Franz Curti (1854–1898), opera composer
- Stefan Zeromski (1864–1925) a Polish novelist and dramatist; nominated four times for the Nobel Prize in Literature
- Martha Burkhardt (1874–1956) a painter and photographer
- Josef Müller-Brockmann (1914–1996) a graphic designer and teacher
- Kurt Aepli (1914–2002) a silversmith, designer of fine jewelry and implements and teacher
- Josef Helbling (born 1935) a former cyclist, competed in the 1960 Summer Olympics
- Gerold Späth (born 1939) an author, poet and writer
- Hans Heinemann (born 1940) a former cyclist, competed in the 1960 and the 1964 Summer Olympics
- Alfredo Battistini (1953–2008) an Italian-Swiss sculptor, illustrator and athlete
- Alexander Hahn (born 1954) is an electronic media artist

== See also ==
- Towns respectively villages of the municipality of Rapperswil-Jona: Bollingen, Busskirch, Jona, Kempraten, Rapperswil
- Points of interest: Circus Knie, Heilig Hüsli, Hochschule für Technik Rapperswil HSR (University of Applied Sciences Rapperswil), Holzbrücke Rapperswil-Hurden, Kapuzinerkloster Rapperswil, Knies Kinderzoo, Lindenhof, Paddle steamer Stadt Rapperswil, Polish Museum Rapperswil, Rapperswil Castle, Hintergasse, Rathaus Rapperswil, Seedamm, Stadtmuseum Rapperswil, Stadtpfarrkirche Rapperswil, Liebfrauenkapelle (Rapperswil), Wurmsbach Abbey, Rapperswil rose gardens
- Tourism in Switzerland

== Literature ==
- Beat Glaus: Der Kanton Linth der Helvetik. Schwyz 2005. ISBN 3-033-00438-5
- Peter Röllin: Kulturbaukasten Rapperswil-Jona. Rapperswil-Jona 2005. ISBN 3-033-00478-4
