= Herzbaracke =

Swiss cabaret-theatre

Coordinates: 47.366226°N 8.544266°E

Herzbaracke is a Swiss cabaret-theatre in the cantons of St. Gallen and Zürich provided on a watercraft on Zürichsee. Herzbaracke is a Swiss German language linguistic joke meaning either "heart barracks" or "heart attack".

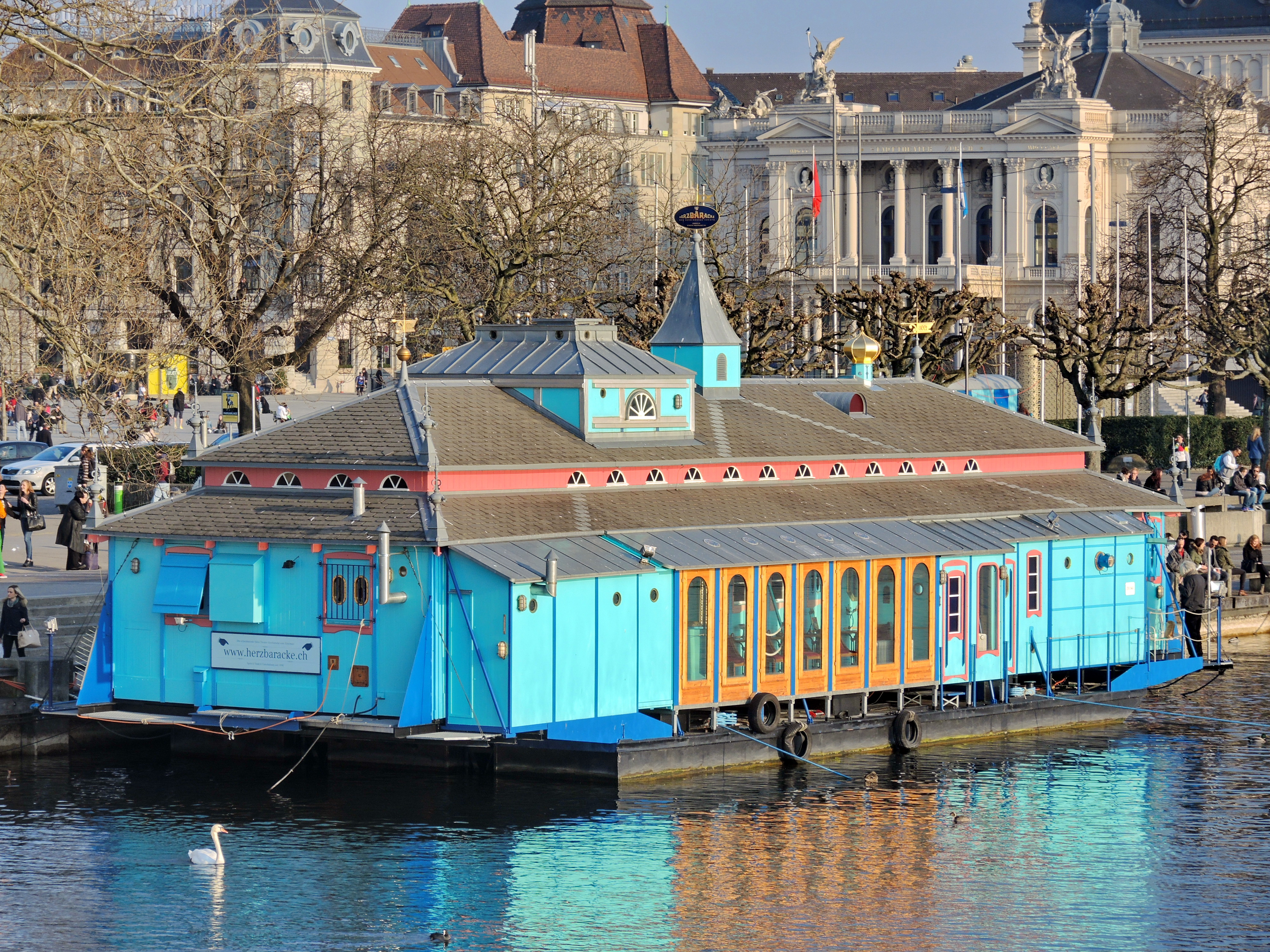
Herzbaracke at Utoquai in Zürich, Sechseläutenplatz in the background.

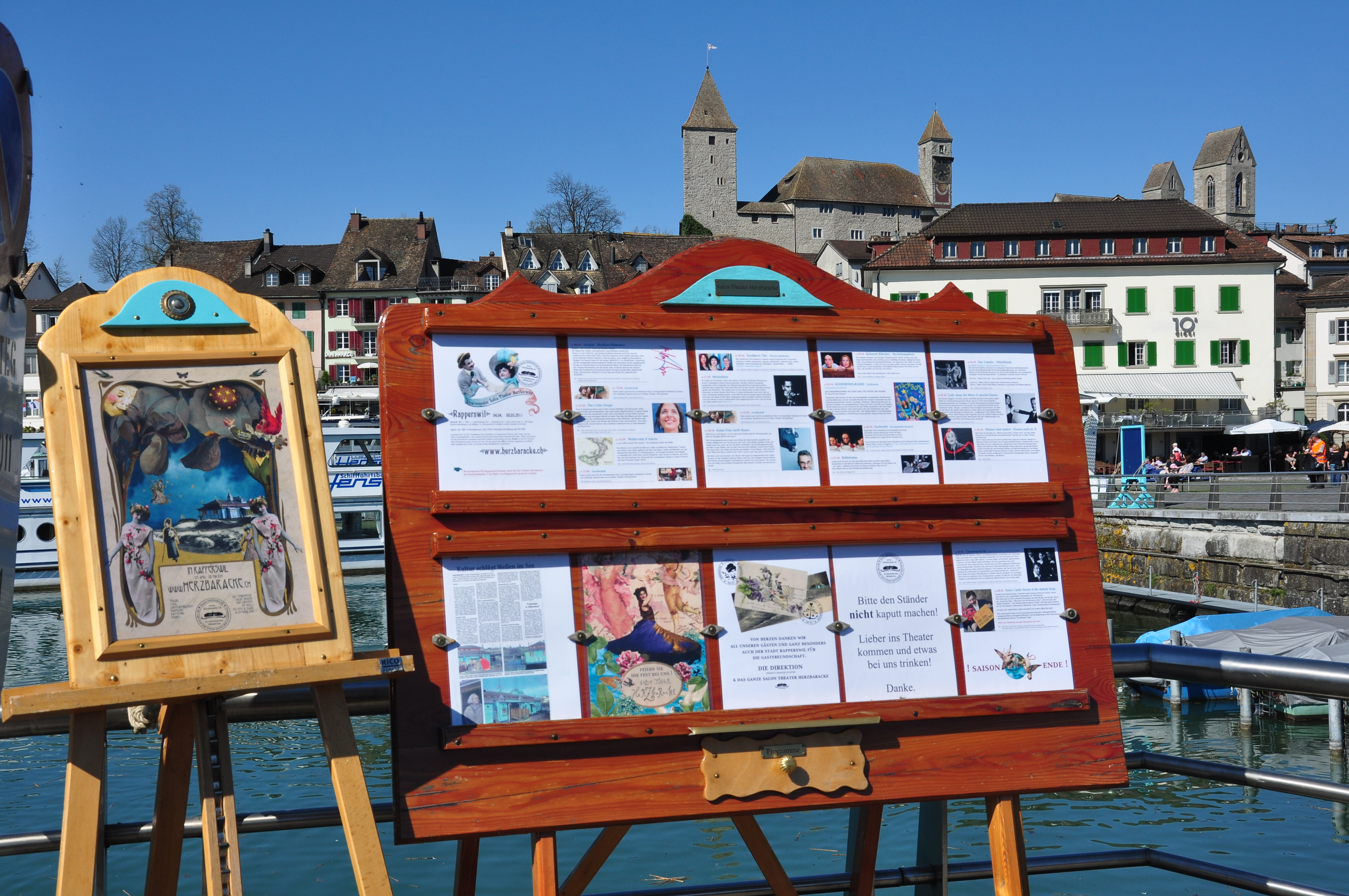
Anchoring at the Rapperswil harbour, Lindenhof and Rapperswil Castle in the background.

== History ==
The project started as an alternative culture program in 1998. Typical for the small theater are graphics and postcards in the Art Nouveau style as a reminiscence of the turn of the century. The Barke, a raft-like vessel type without masts and engine, is due to this setting, lined with pine wood and lit by oil lamps, and decorated with barrel organs and musical boxes.

== Program ==
On the first floor there is a mini-salon full of Art Nouveau pictures where poems of Schiller, Novalis, Hölderlin and Heine are recited, and that may be booked at lunchtime for events with a magician for private parties. Before the nightly shows at 20:30 clock, on request a dinner can be taken that authentically is served by ladies who wear five petticoats under their skirts. In the initial phase, the program was cabaret and theater oriented; today it's more musical oriented, and so Edith Piaf chansons, Klezmer and Blues are played.

Namely in the winter season, the theater is anchoring in the Zürichsee lake shore cities of Rapperswil (April), Stäfa, Thalwil and Zürich (January to March) at Bellevueplatz at the Utoquai. The cabaret-oriented program schedule is combined with diners on board.
