= Kunigunde of Rapperswil =

- Died: c. 4th century AD
- Venerated in: Roman Catholic Church
- Canonized: 16 June 1504, Eichsel, Rheinfelden by Raimund Peraudi
- Feast: June 16
- Patronage: blind and lame people

Kunigunde of Rapperswil (died in early 4th century AD) was a Christian saint. In Old High German her name means fighter for her clan.

== Life ==
Little is known about this saint. She lived in Eichsel near Rheinfelden. She was one of the companions of Saint Ursula during her pilgrimage to Rome. On the way back, Kunigunde died in Rapperswil.
