= Amalie Halter-Zollinger =

Swiss poet and writer (1892–1985)

- Born: 15 June 1892; Hombrechtikon, Switzerland
- Died: 27 April 1985 (aged 92); Hombrechtikon, Switzerland
- Occupations: poet, writer

Amalie Halter-Zollinger (15 June 1892 – 27 April 1985) was a Swiss dialect poet.

== Life ==
Halter-Zollinger spent almost her entire life in Hombrechtikon in her birthplace, which housed her father's watchmaking business and, until World War II, also the grocery and general store run by Amalie Halter.

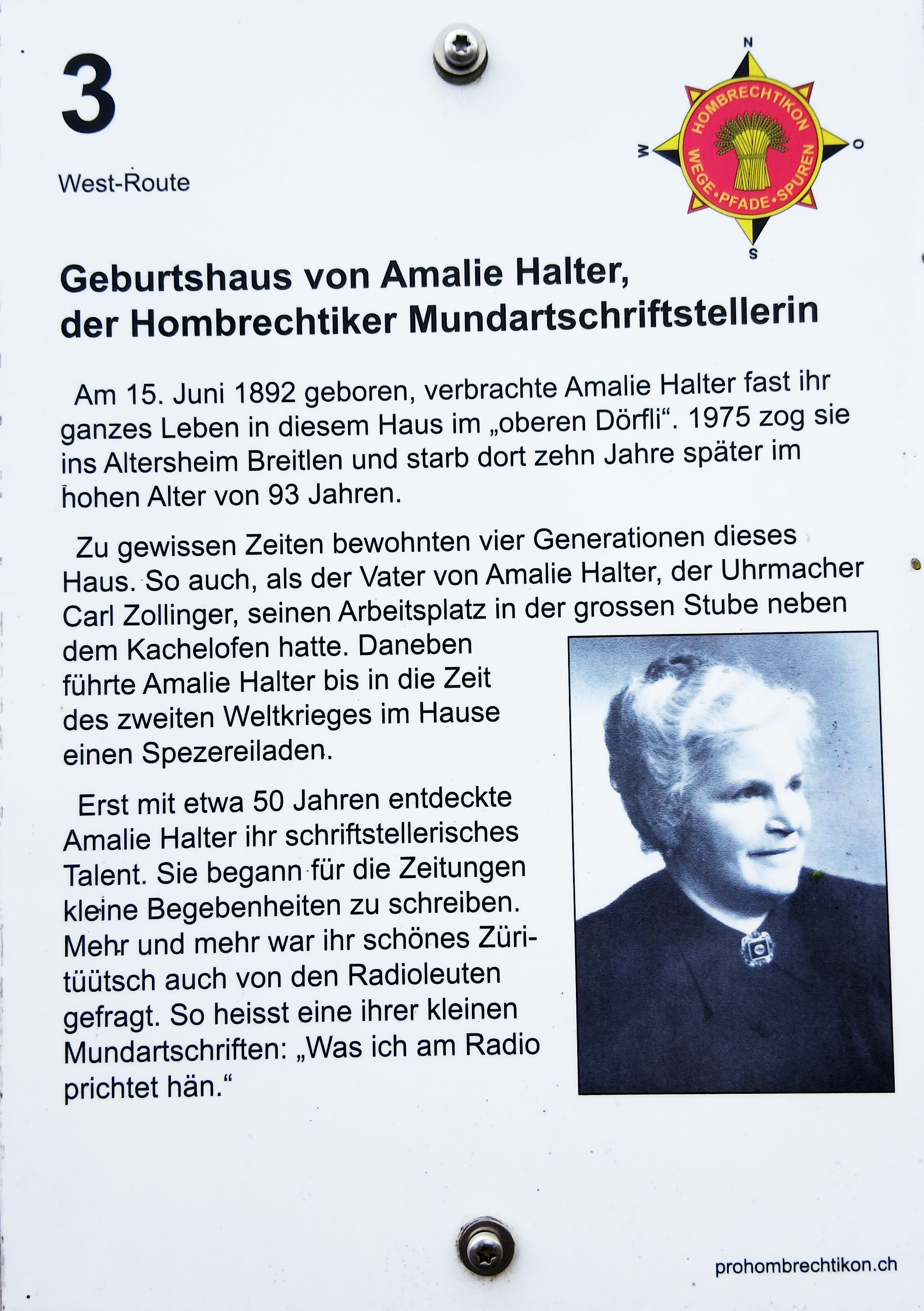
Amalie Halter-Zollinger (1892–1985), dialect poet

She only began writing at around the age of 50, initially with short stories for newspapers. Radio stations quickly became interested in her stories, as Amalie Halter spoke the old Zurich German dialect. she placed great importance on preserving the dialect and using correct spelling. many of her stories and poems were published in book form between 1951 and 2010. A poem by Amalie Halter has been placed in the golden sphere atop the Hombrechtikon church tower since its renovation in 1960.

== Death ==
Amalie Halter died in Hombrechtikon at the age of 92.

== Works ==
- Grossmutter erzählt. Stäfa: Buchdruckerei Stäfa Bd. I, 1951; Bd. II, 1954.
- Meeder tuusig Sprüchwöörter und es Püscheli alt Redesaarde. Gesammelt von Amalie Halter-Zollinger. Hombrechtikon: A. Halter-Zollinger ca. 1950. ISBN 978-3-909149-43-8. Neufassung unter Berücksichtigung der Dialektschreibweise nach Dieth: Meeder tuusig Sprüchwörter und alt Redesarte. Meilen: C. Walter 2000. ISBN 3-909149-43-X.
- Vo s Chäler Heiris. Stäfa: Buchdruckerei Stäfa 1960.
- Was ich am Radio prichtet hän. Stäfa: Buchdruckerei Stäfa 1965.
- Für s Hëërz und s Gmüet. Stäfa: Buchdruckerei Stäfa 1971.
- mit Chlaus Walter: Hombrechtikon. Bilder us der Gmeind am Übergang vom Zürisee zum Oberland. Zeichnet vom Chlaus Walter. Wolfhausen: Dr. Chlaus Walter 1976.
- D Bääbe Schulthess macht käm Franzoos en Chuss : Geschichten und Gedichte. Stäfa: Rothenhäusler 1992. ISBN 3-907960-54-8.
- S Zinnchäntli. Meilen: Walter 2008. ISBN 978-3-905908-01-5. ergänzt, mit ere Furtsetzig verzellt vom Chlaus Walter. Meilen: Walter 2010. ISBN 3-907960-54-8.
