= Centum Prata =

Former Roman vicus in Switzerland

Coordinates: 47°14′0″N 8°49′0″E

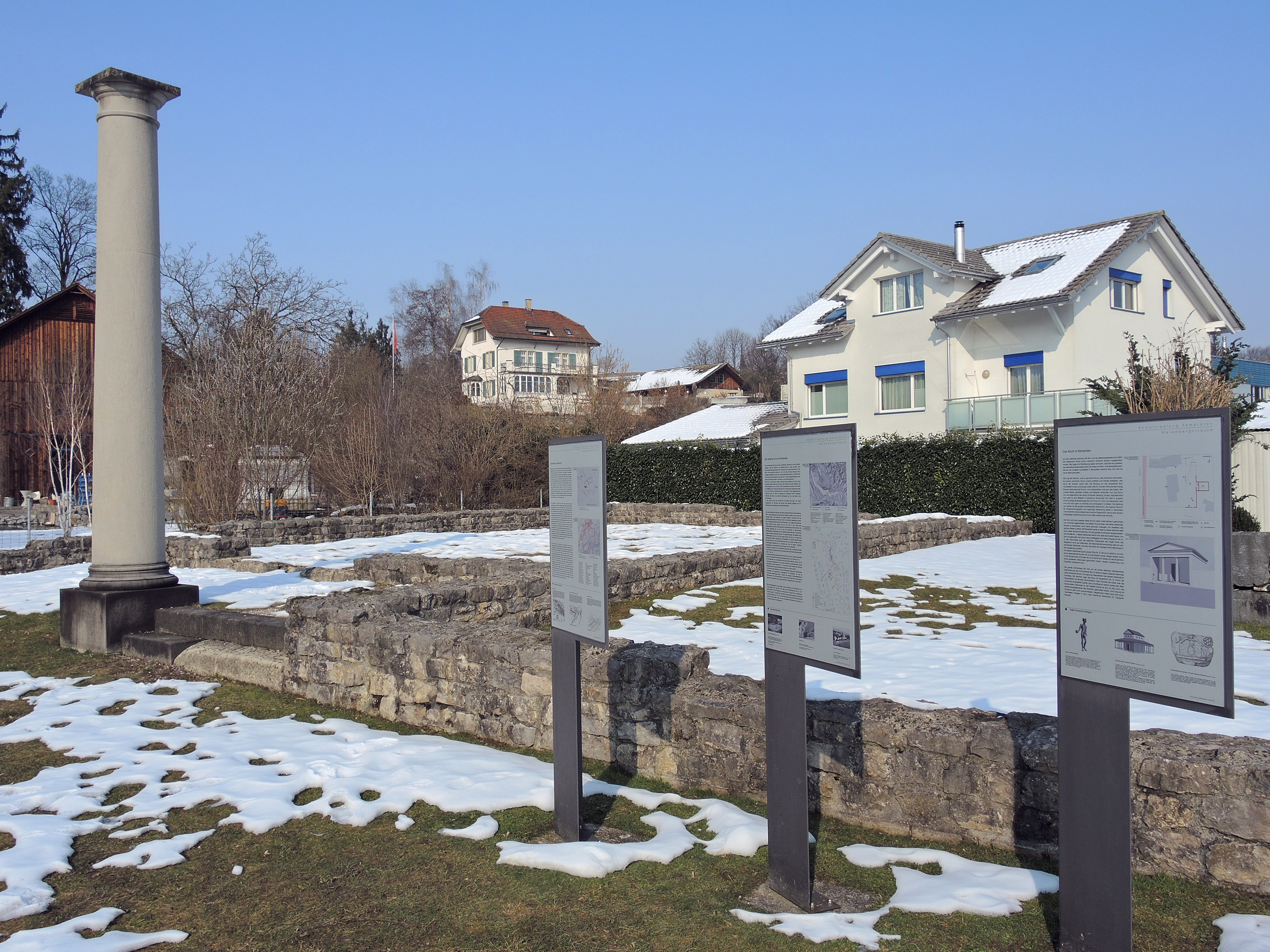
The site in 2013

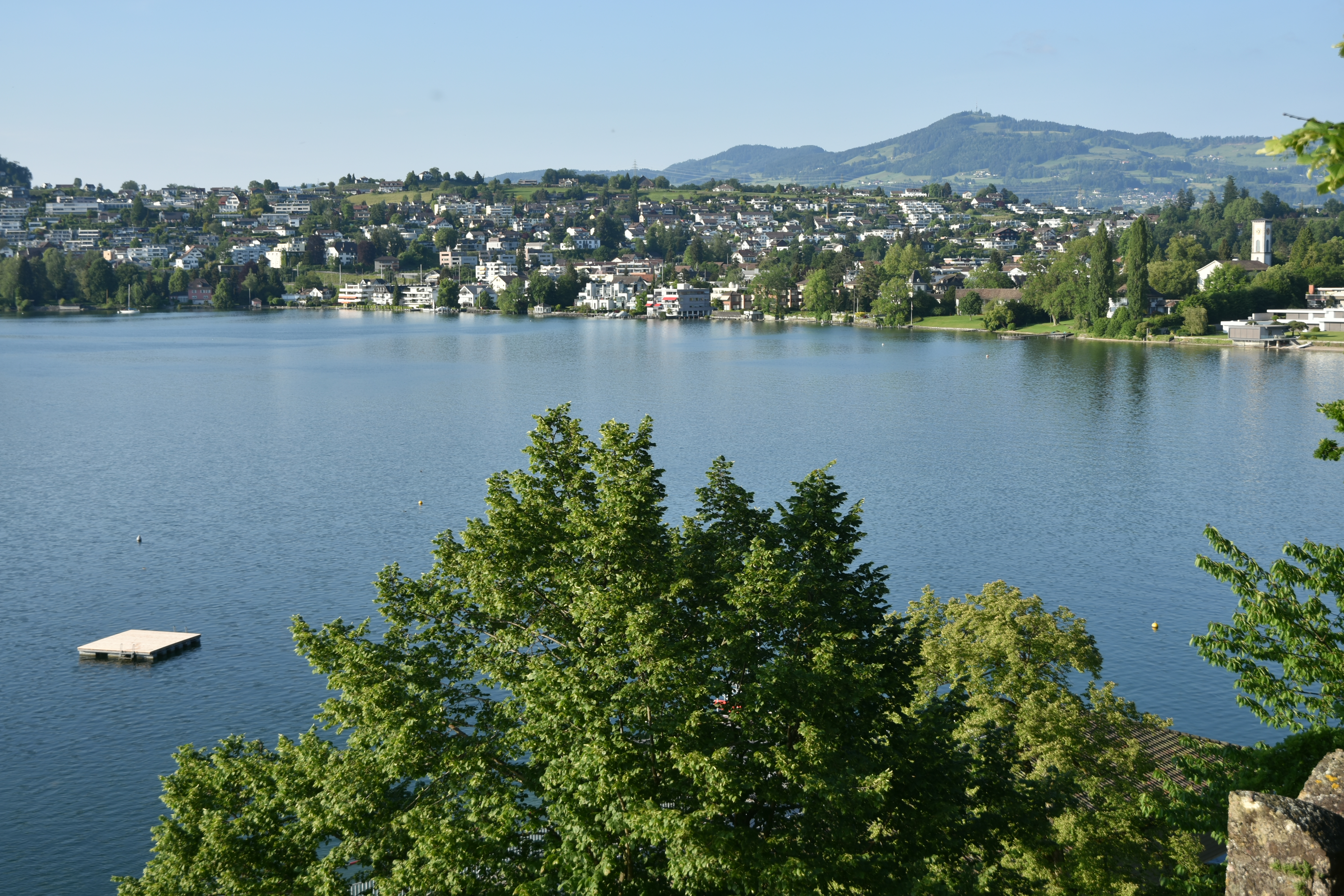
Area of the former vicus: Kempraten and the bay of Kempraten on Zürichsee lakeshore towards Rapperswil as seen from Rapperswil Castle

Centum Prata is the name of a Roman vicus on the eastern shore of Lake Zurich, whose remains are located in Kempraten (to which the vicus lends its name) in the municipality Rapperswil-Jona, canton of St. Gallen, Switzerland. Centum Prata is the most important archaeological site from the Gallo-Roman era in the canton of St. Gallen.

== Name ==
In the Gallo-Roman era the former vicus was named Centoprato (lit. '100 meadows'), and in 863 it was mentioned as Centiprata from which Kempraten is derived. Unclear due to the naming of the settlement is a Celtic origin respectively a former Celtic settlement.

== Geography ==
The majority of the remains of commercial, residential, religious and public buildings are situated in Kempraten, some structures in Rapperswil (St. Ursula church and cemetery), as well at St. Martin Busskirch and at the parish church in Jona. There are also Roman era pile remains of the historical bridge between Rapperswil and Hurden in the upper lake Zürich, found in the 2000s. At the Kempratnerbucht the Roman transshipment harbour for goods, that have been transported on the Roman streets, on the Seedamm area bridge and on the waterway, was situated.

== Location ==
The main road (as of today, Kreuzstrasse and Fluhstrasse) of the vicus Centum Prata was built parallel to the Zürichsee lakeshore at the so-called Kempratnerbucht, meaning bay of Kempraten. It measures about 300 metres (984 ft) in the north-south direction and 200 metres (656 ft) in the east-west axis. The first settlement phase was built in half-timbered and simple wooden houses, later in stone along the main axis. On the eastern edge, there was a cremation cemetery. The centre of the settlement extended to the so-called Römerwiese (literally: Roman meadow), now a residential building complex, where the remains of walls of a Roman building and several exhibits from the excavations are shown to the public. Further remains of stone residential and commercial buildings are located at Meienbergstrasse, where some pillars and the stairs to the entrance of the Forum are re-erected, and in the cemetery in the St. Ursula chapel in Rapperswil. On lakeshore Zürichsee the foundation walls of religious structures were also archaeologically excavated, beginning in the 1990s.

== History ==
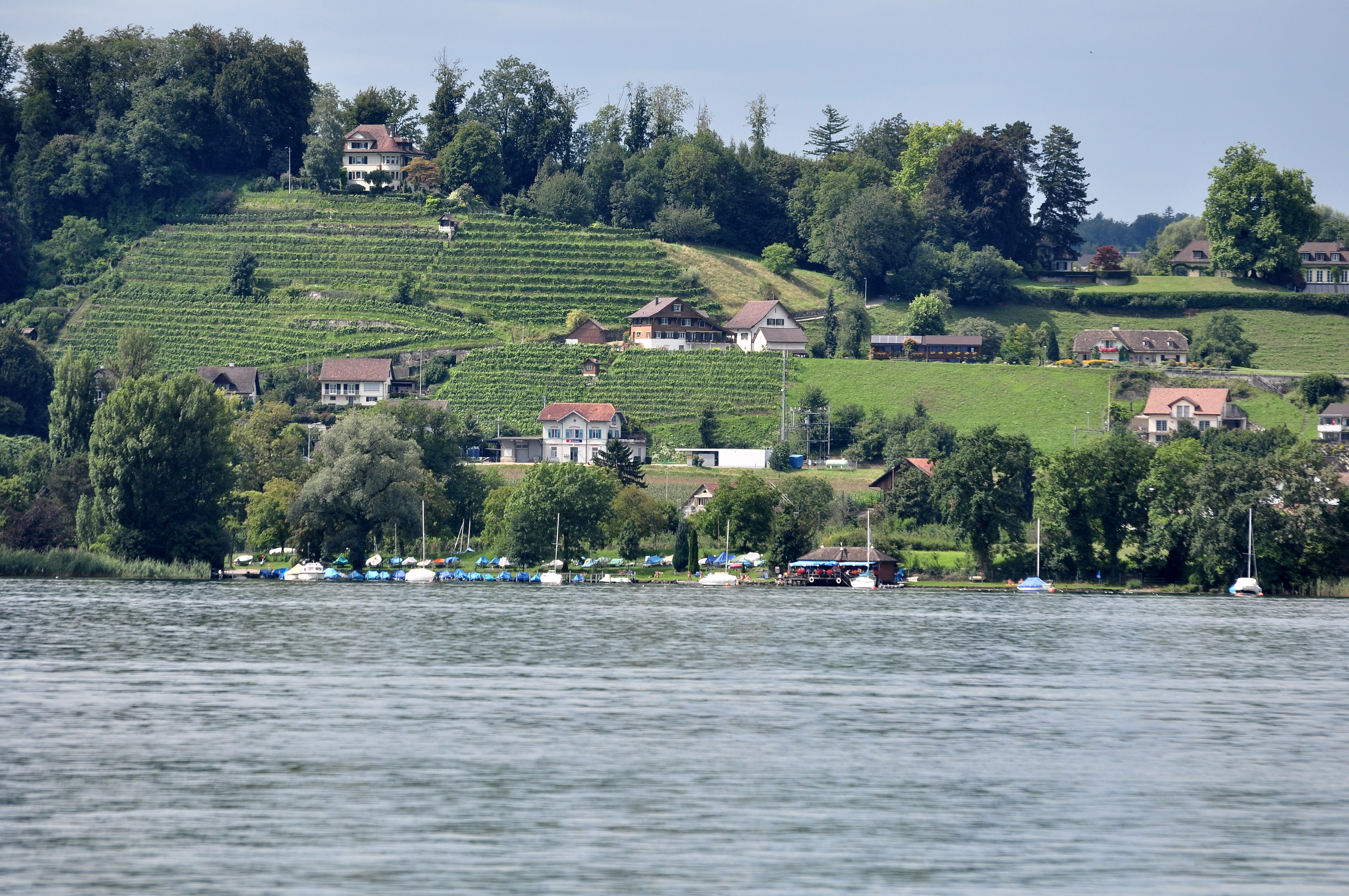
The site of the prehistoric settlement Seegubel as seen from the Zürichsee-Schifffahrtsgesellschaft (ZSG) motorship Helvetia

Seegubel, a Neolothic settlement located between Feldbach and Kempraten, was situated nearby the Seedamm isthmus in close vicinity to the prehistoric lake crossings. The area was neighbored by three other prehistoric pile dwelling settlements: Freienbach–Hurden Rosshorn, Freienbach–Hurden Seefeld and Rapperswil-Jona–Technikum. The area at the so-called Kempratnerbucht, a natural indentation on the eastern lake shore, extends between Feldbach and the Lindenhof hill in Rapperswil on a length of about 3 kilometres (2 mi). Due to its location, the area was already inhabited in pre-Roman times and was used as a natural harbor.

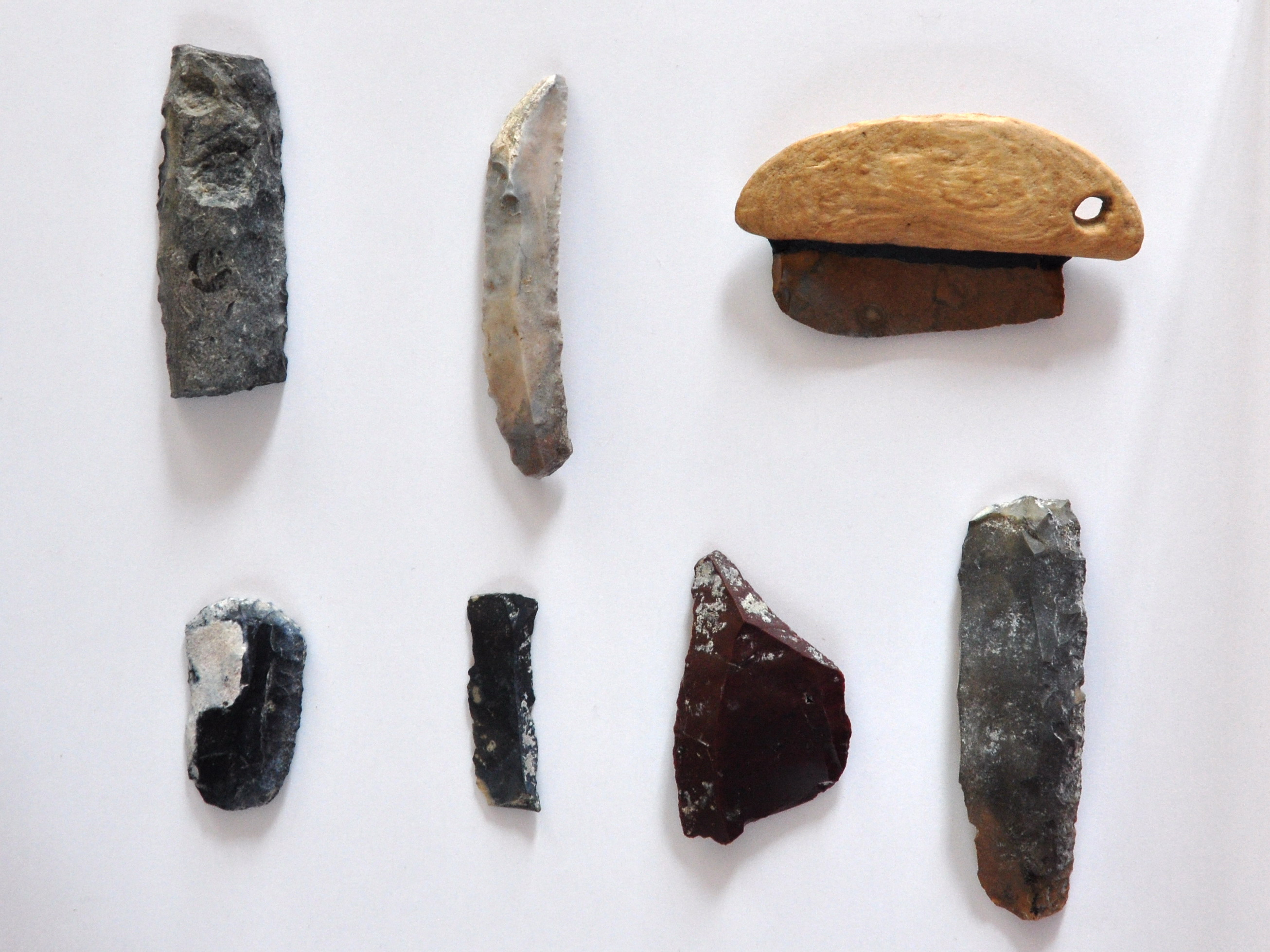
Samples of the different tools found at Seegubel

Centum Prata was founded around 40 AD at the intersection of the roads between Zürich (Turicum) and assumably via Irgenhausen Castrum towards Winterthur (Vitudurum), on the waterway over Obersee, the present Linth canal and Walensee towards Chur (Curia Raetorum), and on the alpine route towards the Roman heartland in northern Italy. Hence, the vicus became a commercial center for the surrounding area where artisans, traders, sailors and teamsters lived.

Following the prehistorical lake crossings at the present Seedamm isthmus, a 6 metres (20 ft) wide wooden bridge under Empire Marcus Aurelius was built around 161–180. Centum Prata became an important Roman settlement which besides its regional and transport hub functions also may have served to secure the province borders from the 1st to the 4th century AD. Following the withdrawal of Roman troops to Italy around 400 AD, the settlement was continuously used by the Gallo-Roman population, and remained even after the invasion of the Alemanni up to the present time inhabited.

== Buildings ==
=== Commercial and residential buildings ===
Around 120 AD stone buildings with courtyards were erected after a devastating fire in the centre of the village. On its periphery were timber framing houses with long rectangular floor plans were built. Commercial buildings were oriented to the street, facing away from the street, in the same buildings also the living quarters were situated. In the backyards, probably one- to two-roomed smaller buildings were erected, as well as areas for gardens, animal husbandry, rubbish pits and kilns.

=== Public buildings ===
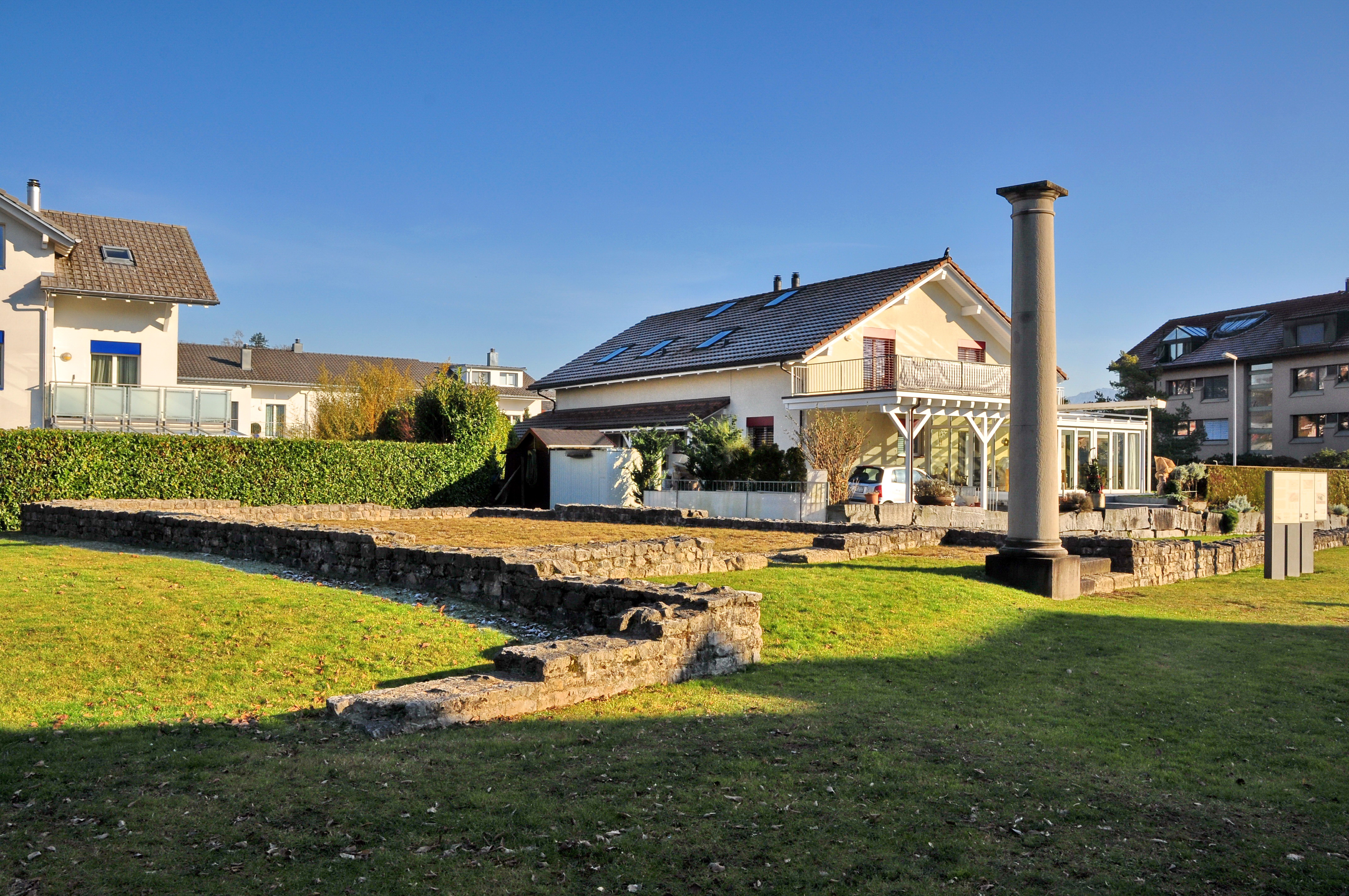
Meienbergstrasse, former Forum

The Forum at the present Meienbergstrasse lane hosted on its eastern side (Rütistrasse) a stone with two distinctive front pillars. The forum was accessible by a wide staircase and by a double door to the main room. The foundations are preserved, as well as the pivots of the door leaf and the locking hole. Due to its central location and the front pillars, the building may also interpreted as a temple. The front of the large square was completed by symmetrical lateral walls. To the west of the plant, there was another stone building with columns, maybe uses as a Curia or temple.

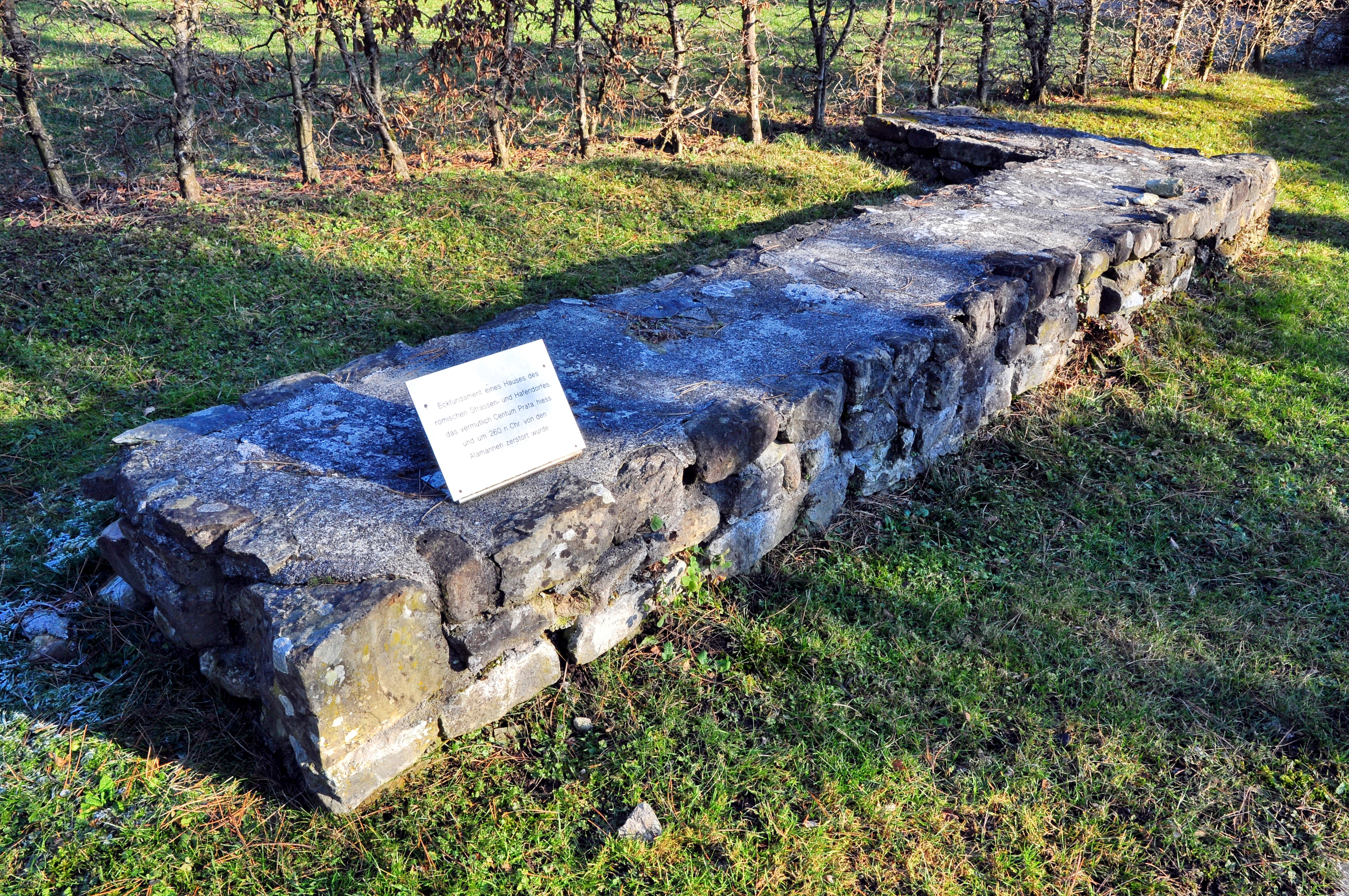
Cemetery of the St. Ursula chapel

Public institutions such as the spas, are suspected at the area of the present cemetery at the St. Ursula church, and a walled temple precinct with two Gallo-Roman temples, a fire altar and two chapels on the northwest of the settlement at the Seewiese area, then the edge of the settlement on Kempratnerbucht. On the exit road (Rütistrasse–Rebacker) towards Vitudurum, a digger fire field with around 50 burials archaeologically was recorded.

== Heritage site of national significance ==
The area of the vicus Centum Prata and the historical lake crossings are listed in the Swiss inventory of cultural property of national and regional significance as Class A objects of national importance. Hence, the area is provided as a historical site under federal protection, within the meaning of the Swiss Federal Act on the nature and cultural heritage (German: Bundesgesetz über den Natur- und Heimatschutz NHG) of 1 July 1966. Unauthorised researching and purposeful gathering of findings represent a criminal offense according to Art. 24.

== Gallery ==
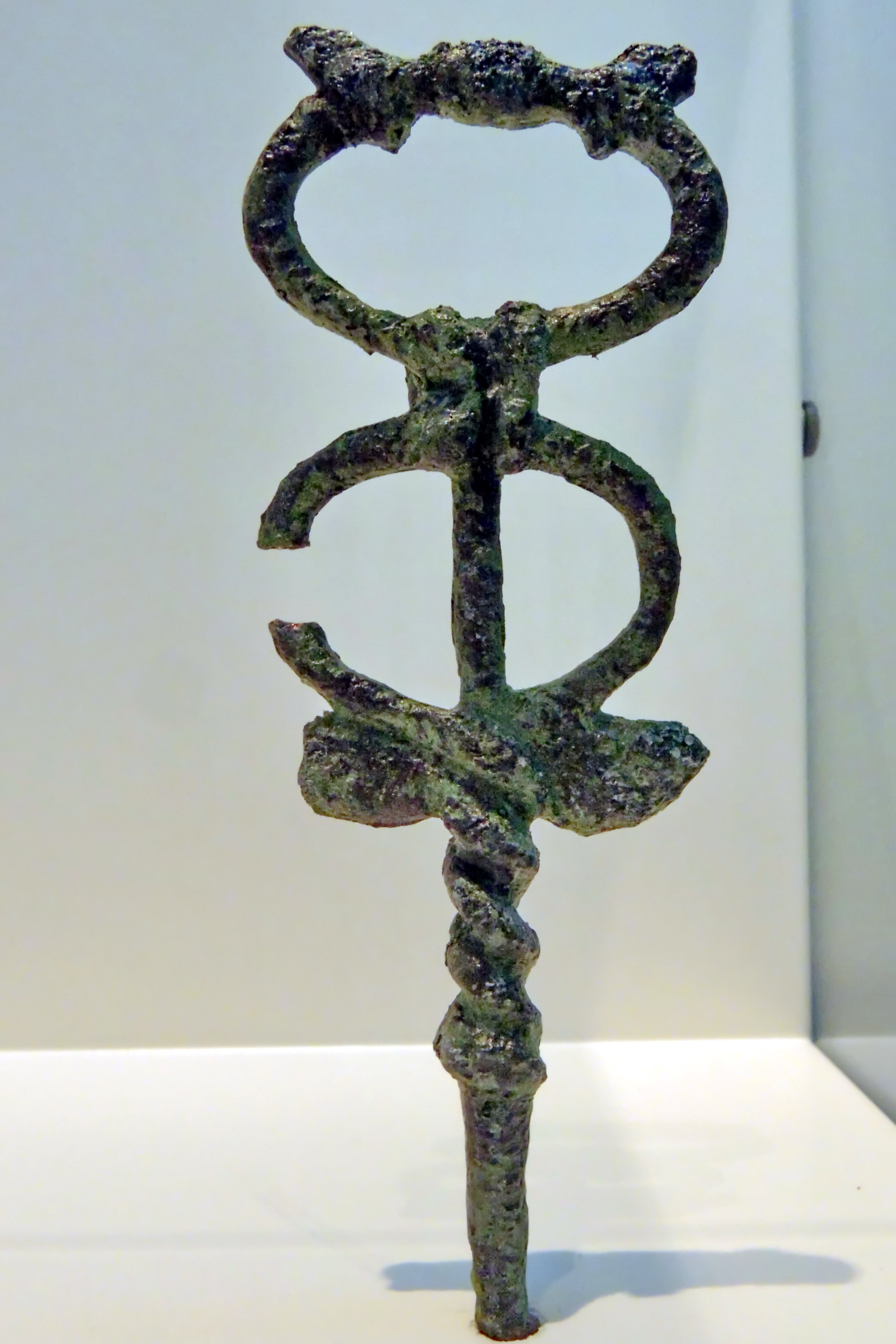
Caduceus

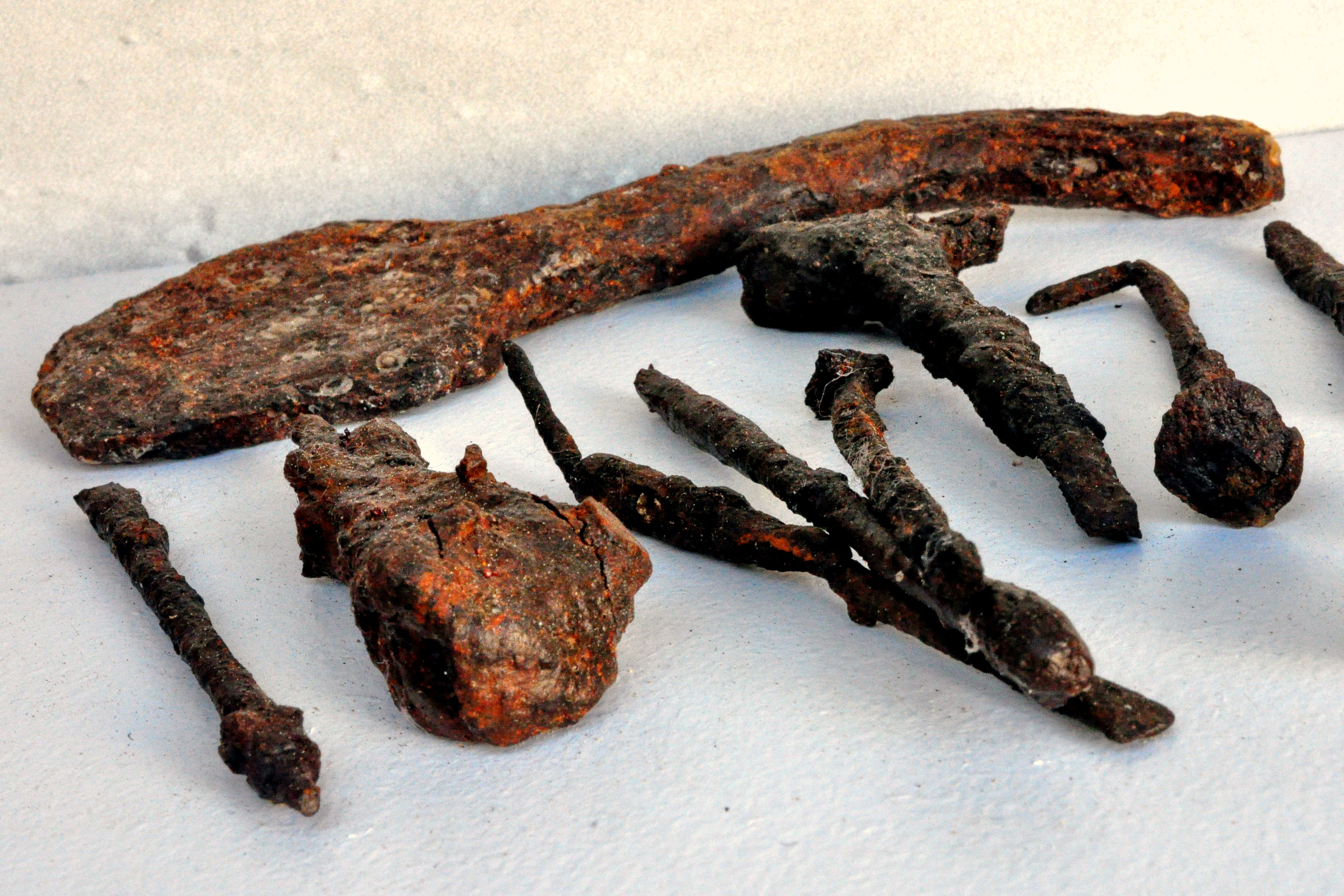
Iron nails and tools, Römerwiese

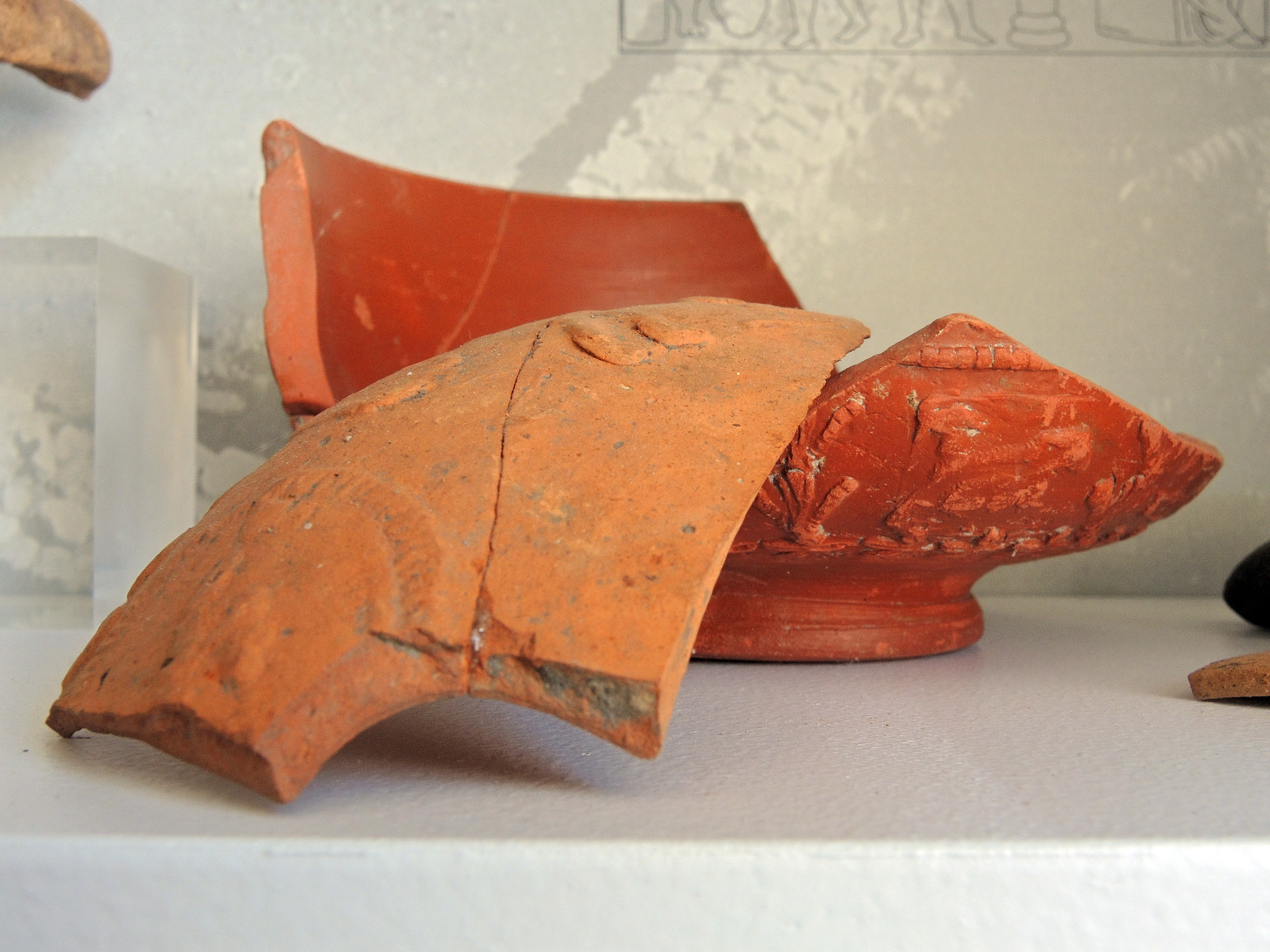
Roman ceramics, Römerwiese

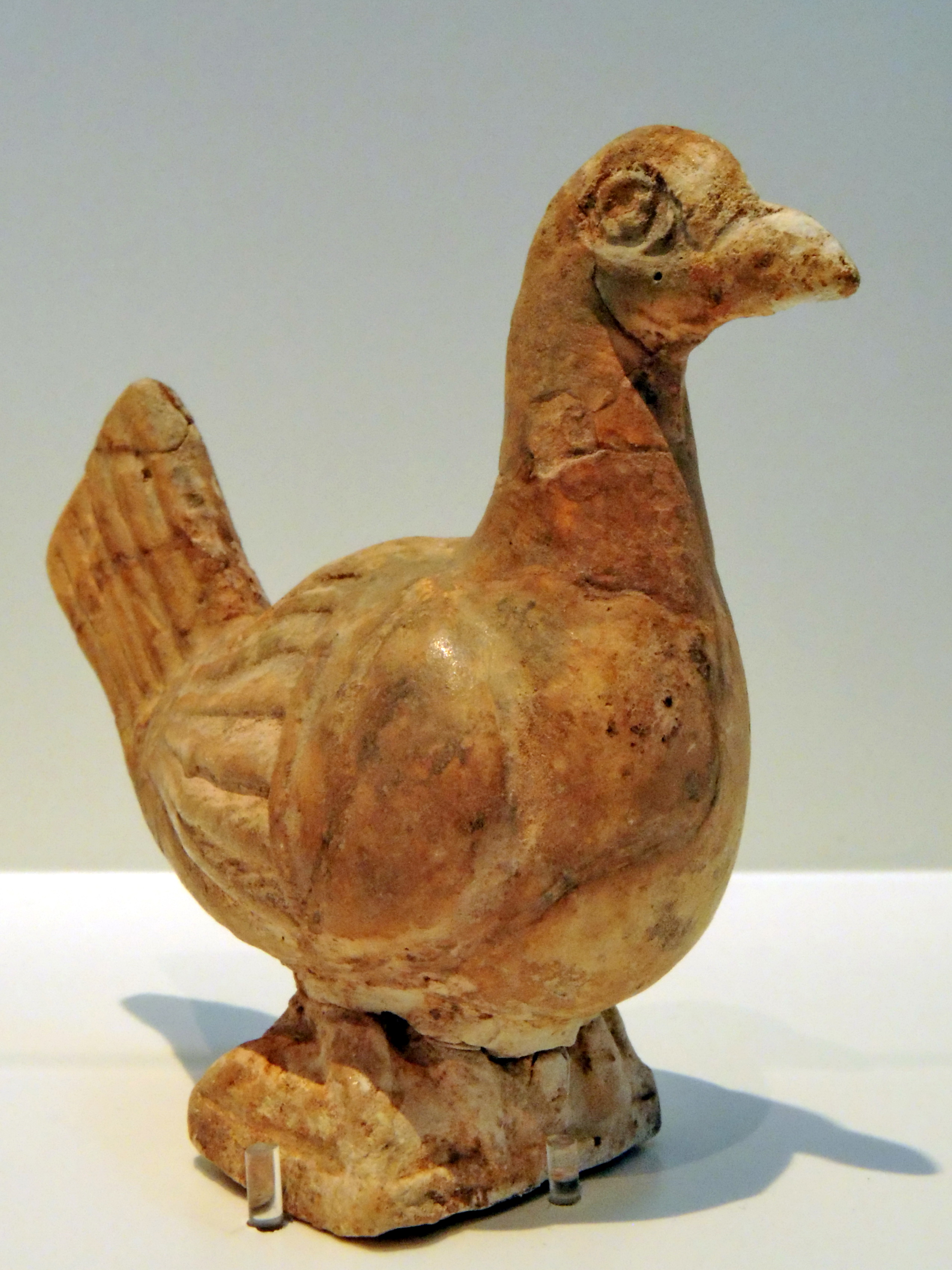
Terracotta grave goods probably from central Gaul, 2nd AD, Stadtmuseum Rapperswil

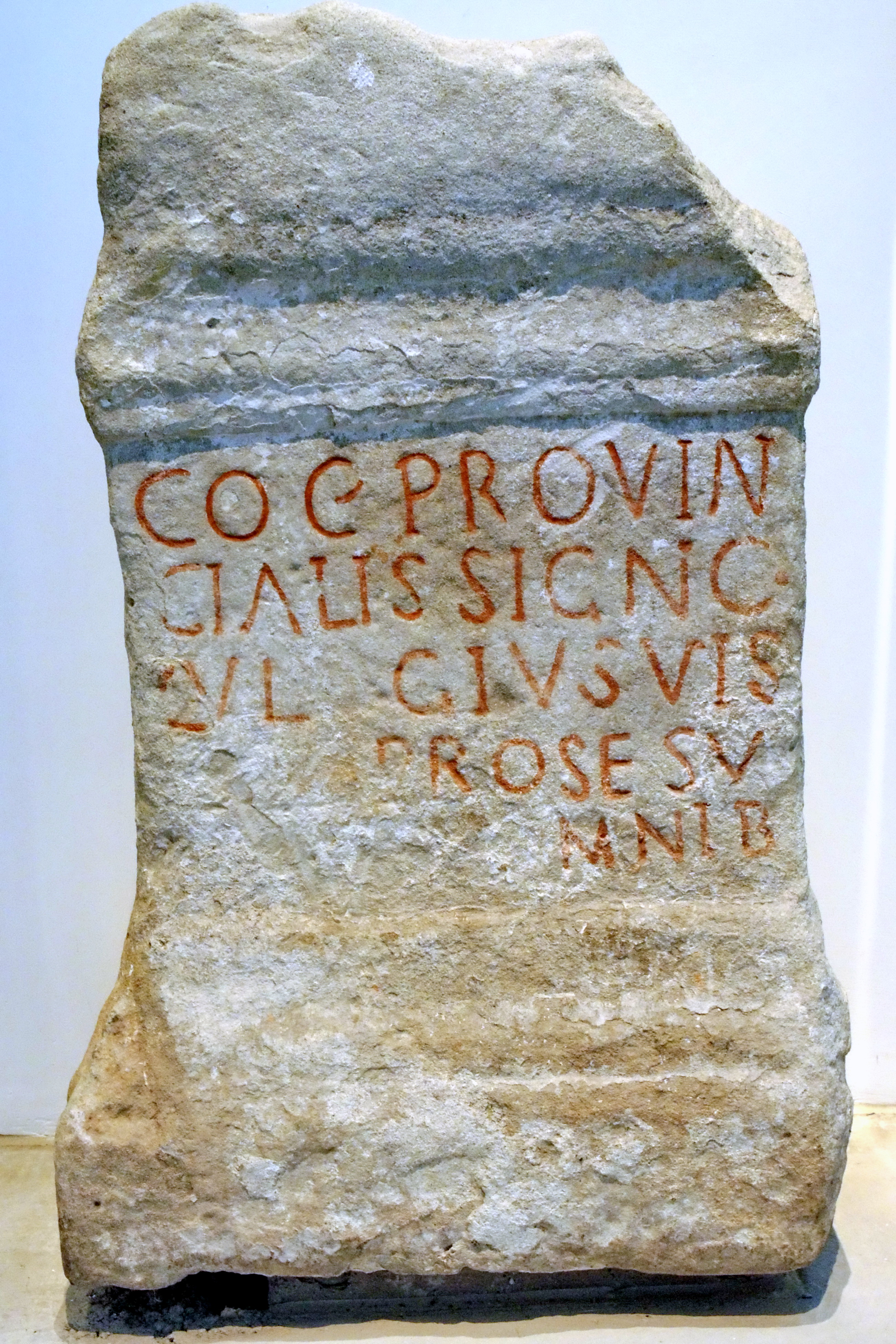
Roman stone consecration, parish church in Jona respectively Stadtmuseum

== See also ==
- Lists of Roman sites

== Literature ==
- Beat Eberschweiler: Ur- und frühgeschichtliche Verkehrswege über den Zürichsee: Erste Ergebnisse aus den Taucharchäologischen Untersuchungen beim Seedamm. In: Mitteilungen des Historischen Vereins des Kantons Schwyz, Volume 96, Schwyz 2004.
- Georg Matter: Die Römersiedlung Kempraten und ihre Umgebung. Hrsg. Gemeinde Jona, 2003.
- G. Matter: Der römische Vicus von Kempraten. In: JbSGUF 82, 1999, p. 183–211.
- D. Hintermann: Der römische Vicus von Kempraten. In: HA 106-108, 1996, p. 128–136.
