= Feldbach railway station =

Railway station in Switzerland

Feldbach
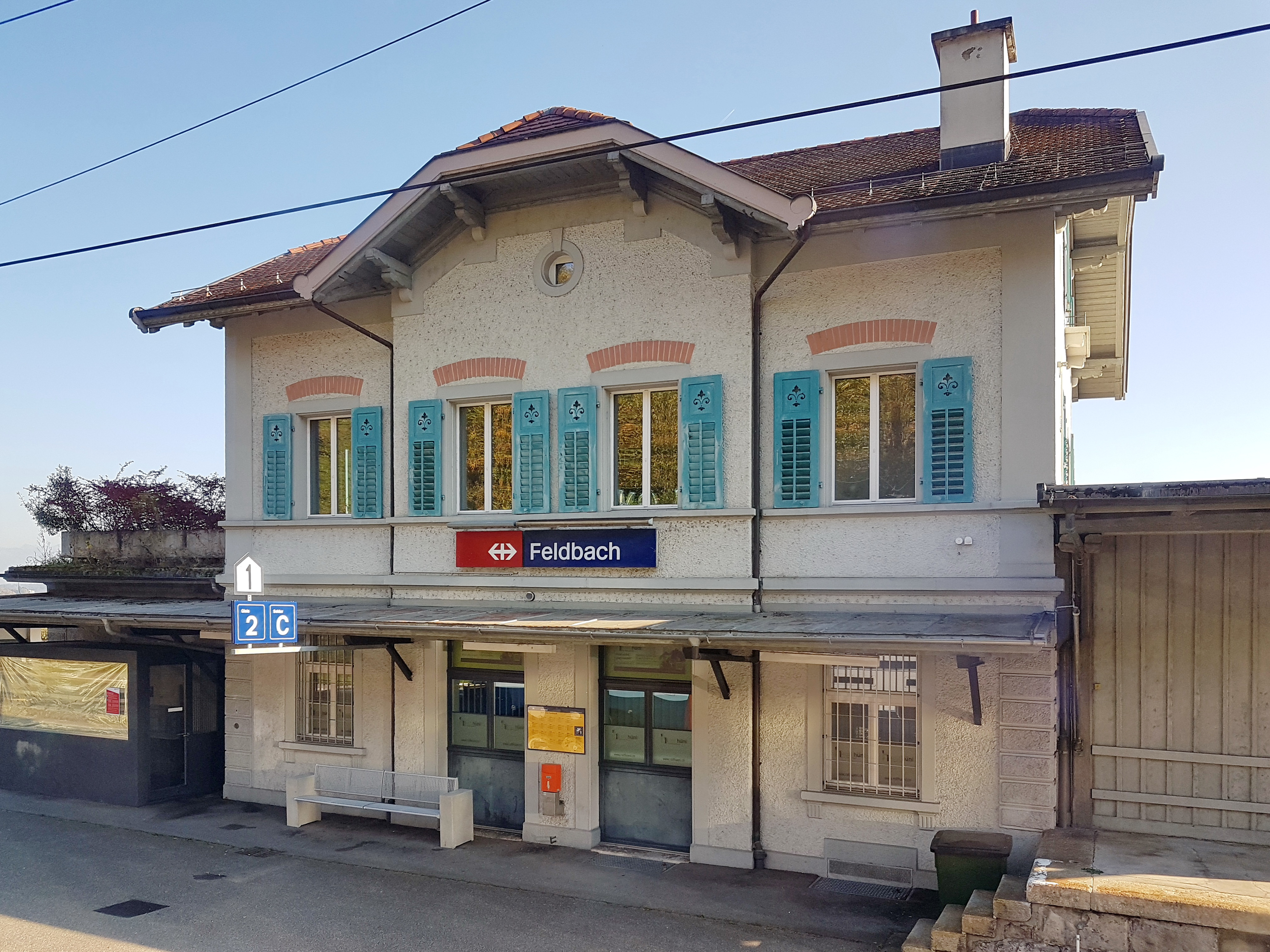
- The station building in 2017

General information
- Location: Bahnhofstrasse; Feldbach, Hombrechtikon, Zürich; Switzerland
- Coordinates: 47°14′20″N 8°47′01″E
- Elevation: 426 m (1,398 ft)
- Owner: Swiss Federal Railways
- Operator: Swiss Federal Railways
- Line: Lake Zurich right-bank railway line
- Distance: 31.4 km (19.5 mi) from Zürich Hauptbahnhof
- Platforms: 2 side platforms
- Tracks: 2
- Train operators: Swiss Federal Railways
- Connections: VZO bus route 970

Other information
- Fare zone: 133 (ZVV)

Services
| Preceding station | Zurich S-Bahn | Following station |
|---|---|---|
| Uerikon towards Winterthur | S7 | Kempraten towards Rapperswil |
Location
- Location within Switzerland Location within Canton of Zürich

Feldbach railway station (German: Bahnhof Feldbach) is a railway station in the Swiss canton of Zurich, situated near the village of Feldbach and Lake Zurich in the municipality of Hombrechtikon. The station is located on the Lake Zurich right bank railway line, within fare zone 133 of the Zürcher Verkehrsverbund (ZVV).

== Services ==
As of the December 2021 timetable change, the station is served by the following S-Bahn trains:

- Zurich S-Bahn:
  - S7 Winterthur–Kloten–Hardbrücke–Zürich HB–Meilen–Rapperswil
    Operates non stop between Stadelhofen and Meilen, Winterthur and Effretikon, stops in Kemptthal as of 9:20 PM.

A regional bus stop is adjacent to the railway station, served by buses of the Verkehrsbetriebe Zürichsee und Oberland (VZO).

== Gallery ==
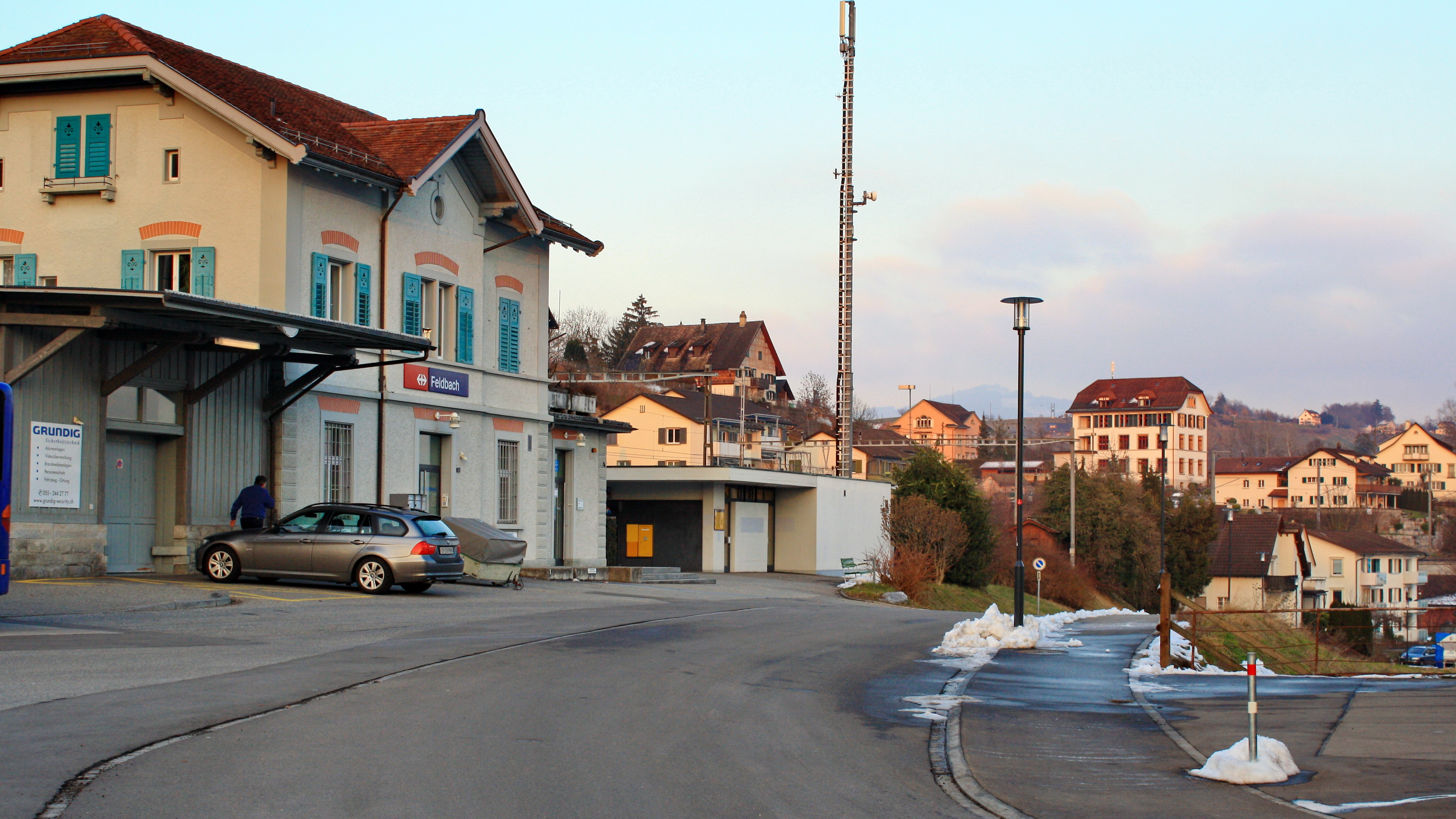
The station building in 2010

== See also ==
- Rail transport in Switzerland
