= Lützelsee =

Lake in Zurich, Switzerland

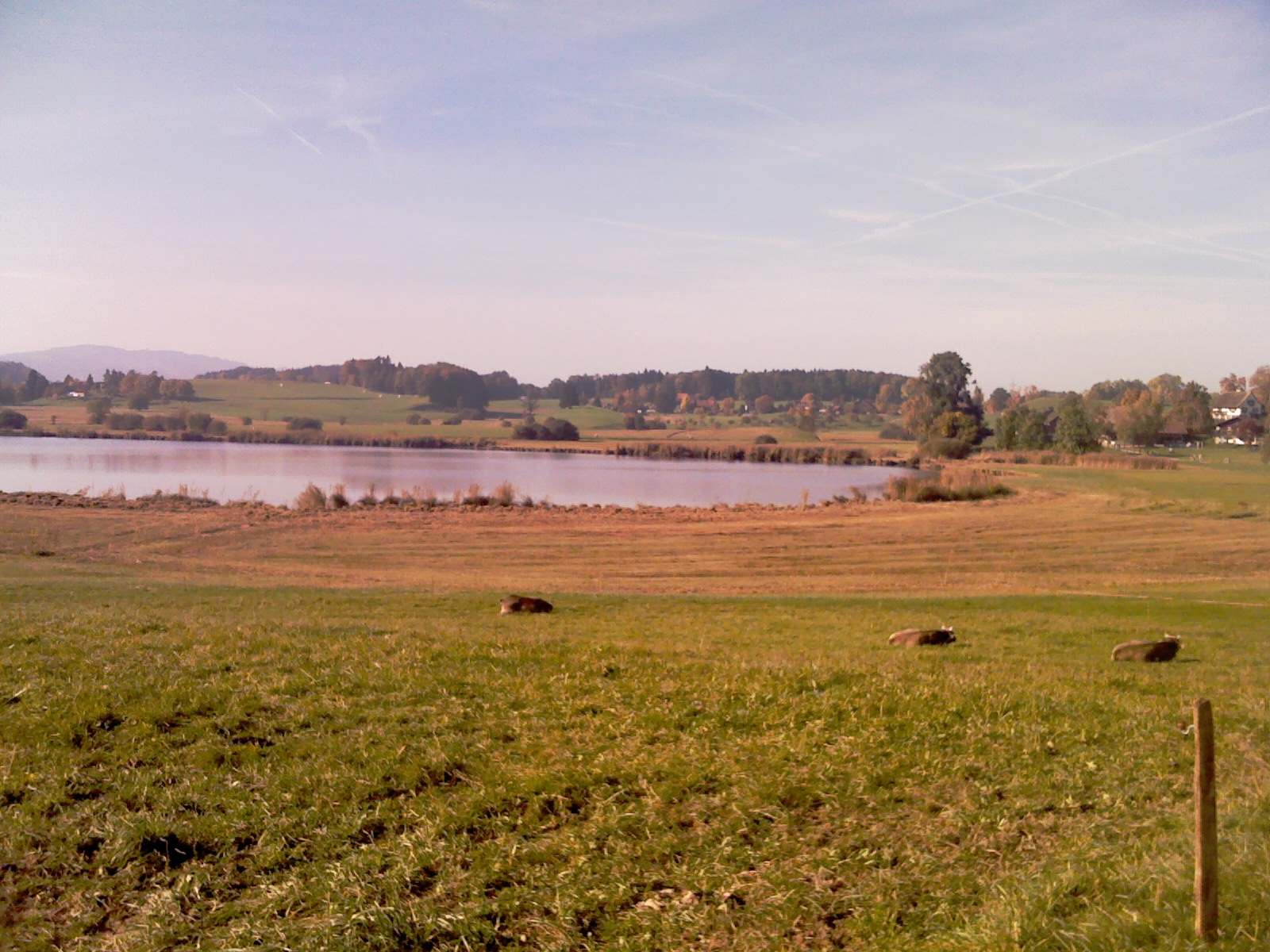

- Location within Canton of Zurich Location within Switzerland Location within Alps
- Interactive map of Lützelsee
- Location: Canton of Zurich
- Coordinates: 47°15′35″N 8°46′21″E
- Primary outflows: Tobelbach
- Catchment area: 5.709 km^{2} (2.204 sq mi)
- Basin countries: Switzerland
- Surface area: 0.13 km^{2} (0.050 sq mi)
- Average depth: 4.2 m (14 ft)
- Max. depth: 6.1 m (20 ft)
- Surface elevation: 500 m (1,600 ft)

Lützelsee is a lake north of Hombrechtikon, Canton of Zurich, Switzerland. Its surface area is 13 ha (32 acres).
