= Seeweidsee =

Lake in Zurich, Switzerland

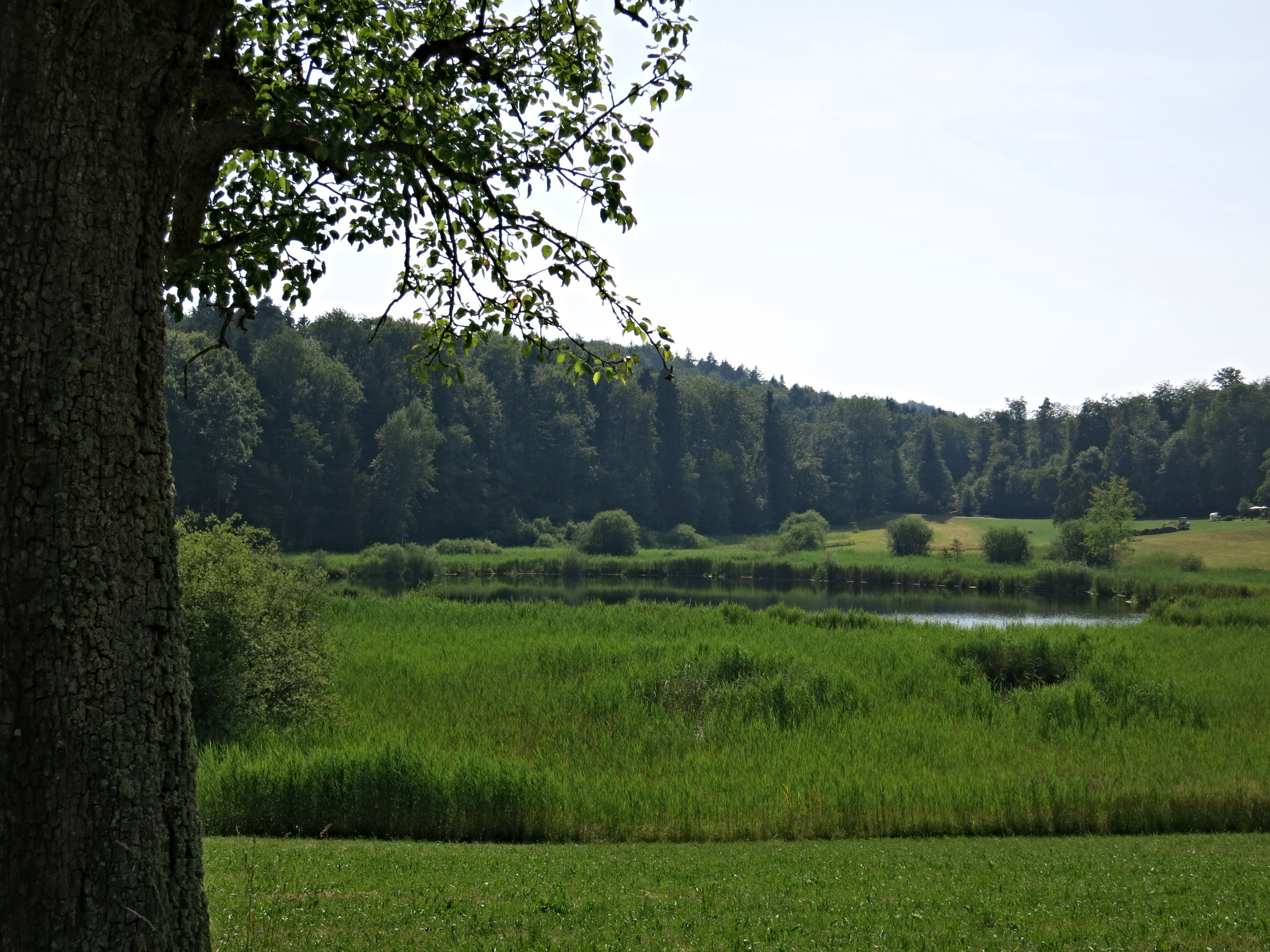
- Lake Seeweidsee in July of 2015.

- Location within Canton of Zurich Location within Switzerland Location within Alps
- Interactive map of Seeweidsee
- Location: Canton of Zurich
- Coordinates: 47°15′25″N 8°44′46″E
- Catchment area: 25.8 ha (64 acres)
- Basin countries: Switzerland
- Surface area: 1.2 ha (3.0 acres)
- Average depth: 3.3 m (11 ft)
- Max. depth: 5.3 m (17 ft)
- Residence time: 100 days
- Surface elevation: 550 m (1,800 ft)

Seeweidsee is a lake in the municipality of Hombrechtikon, in the Canton of Zurich, Switzerland. Its surface area is 1.2 ha (3.0 acres). Lake has grass floating mat at it shores.
