= Kempraten =

Former municipality of Switzerland in St. Gallen

- Former municipality
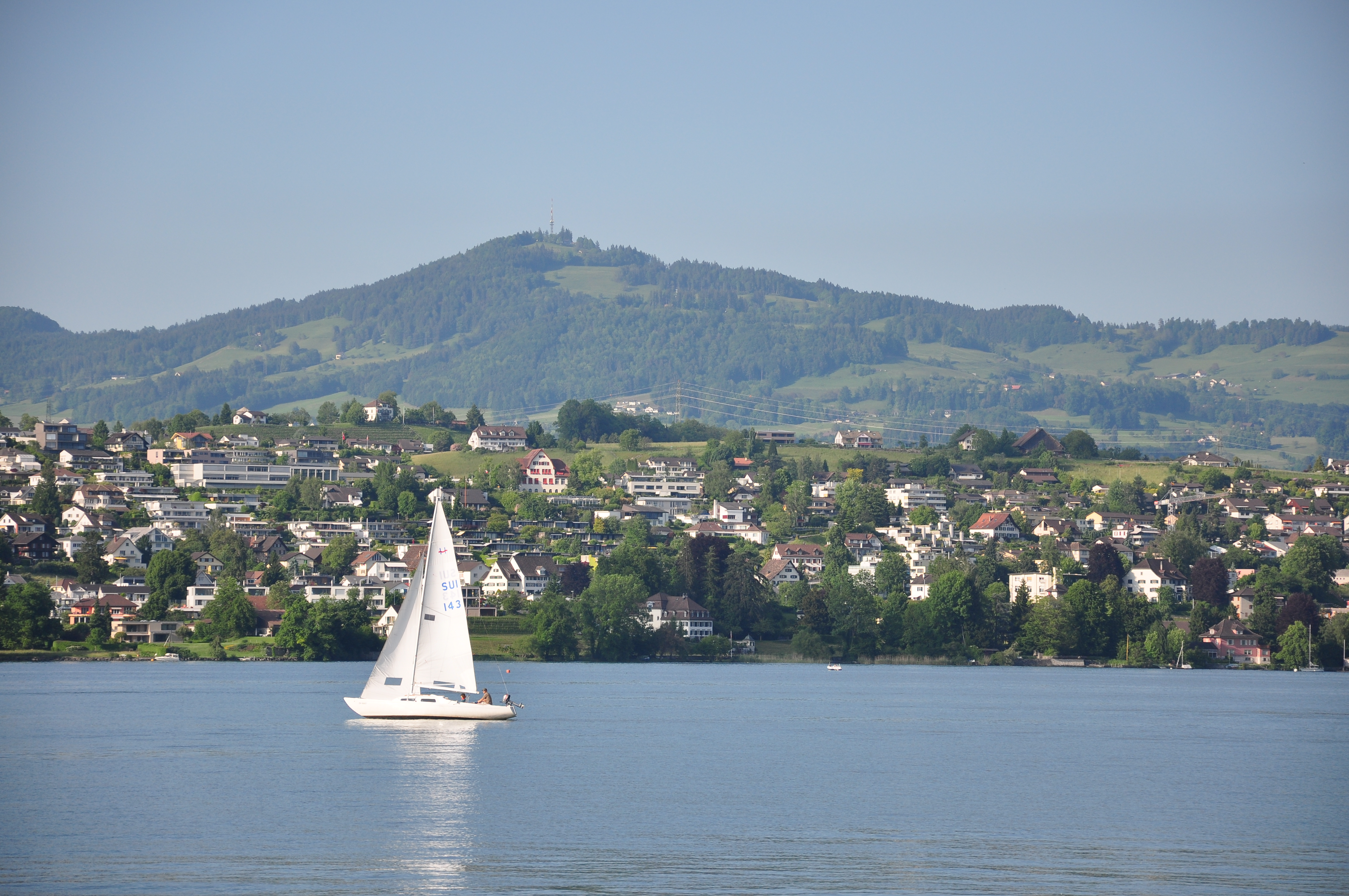
- Location of Kempraten
- Location within Switzerland Location within Canton of St. Gallen
- Coordinates: 47°14′N 8°49′E
- Country: Switzerland
- Canton: St. Gallen
- District: See-Gaster
- Municipality: Rapperswil-Jona
- Elevation: 409 m (1,342 ft)
- Time zone: UTC+01:00 (CET)
  - Summer (DST): UTC+02:00 (CEST)
- Postal code: 8640
- ISO 3166 code: CH-SG
- Surrounded by: Bubikon (ZH), Hombrechtikon (ZH), Jona, Rapperswil, Rüti (ZH)
- Website: www.rapperswil-jona.ch

Kempraten-Lenggis is a village (Kirchdorf) within the municipality of Rapperswil-Jona, Wahlkreis (constituency) of See-Gaster in the canton of St. Gallen in Switzerland. The remains of the Gallo-Roman settlement Centum Prata are one of the most important archaeological sites in the canton of St. Gallen; Centrum Prata is located at the so-called Kempratnerbucht, in Rapperswil and Busskirch on Zürichsee lake shore.

== Geography ==
Kempraten-Lenggis was a village of the former independent municipality of Jona that in 2006 merged with Rapperswil to the town of Rapperswil-Jona. It is located on the right-hand (northeastern) shore of Lake Zurich (German: Zürichsee) northerly of Rapperswil on the so-called Kempratnerbucht, literally "Bay of Kempraten". This natural indentation on the eastern lake shore extends between Feldbach, Hombrechtikon, and Rapperswil on a length of about 3 kilometres (2 mi). Due to its location, the area was already inhabited in pre-Roman times and once was used as a natural harbor. To the east, Kempraten is bordered by the bay respectively the Lindenhof hill in Rapperswil. These area of the village is called Kempraten.

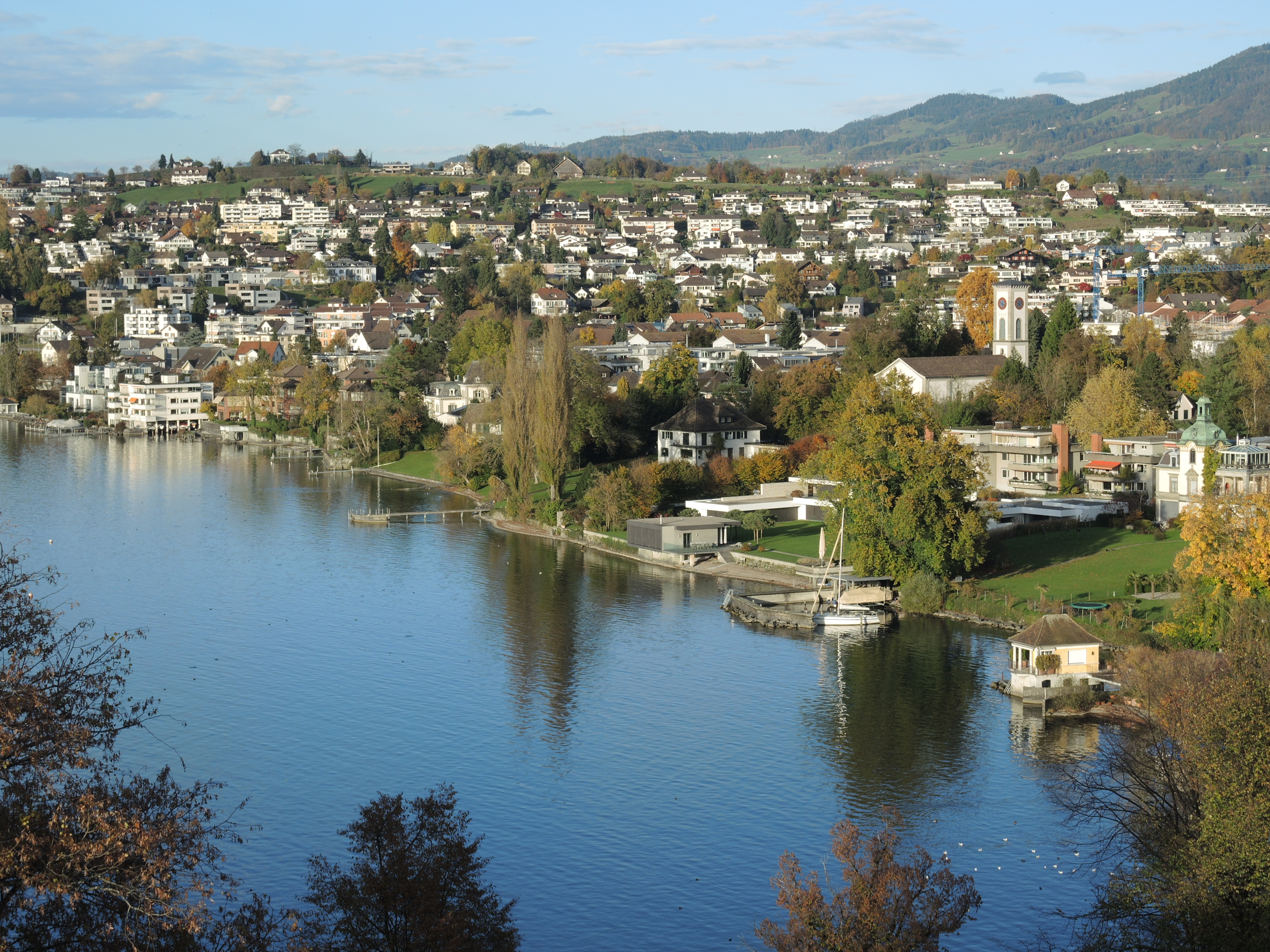
Lenggis as seen from Lindenhof in Rapperswil

Situated in the east, Lenggis is a longish hill slope where the residential area is growing fast and that is bordered by the neighbouring municipalities of Bubikon and Rüti which as well as Feldbach are situated in the Canton of Zürich.

== History ==
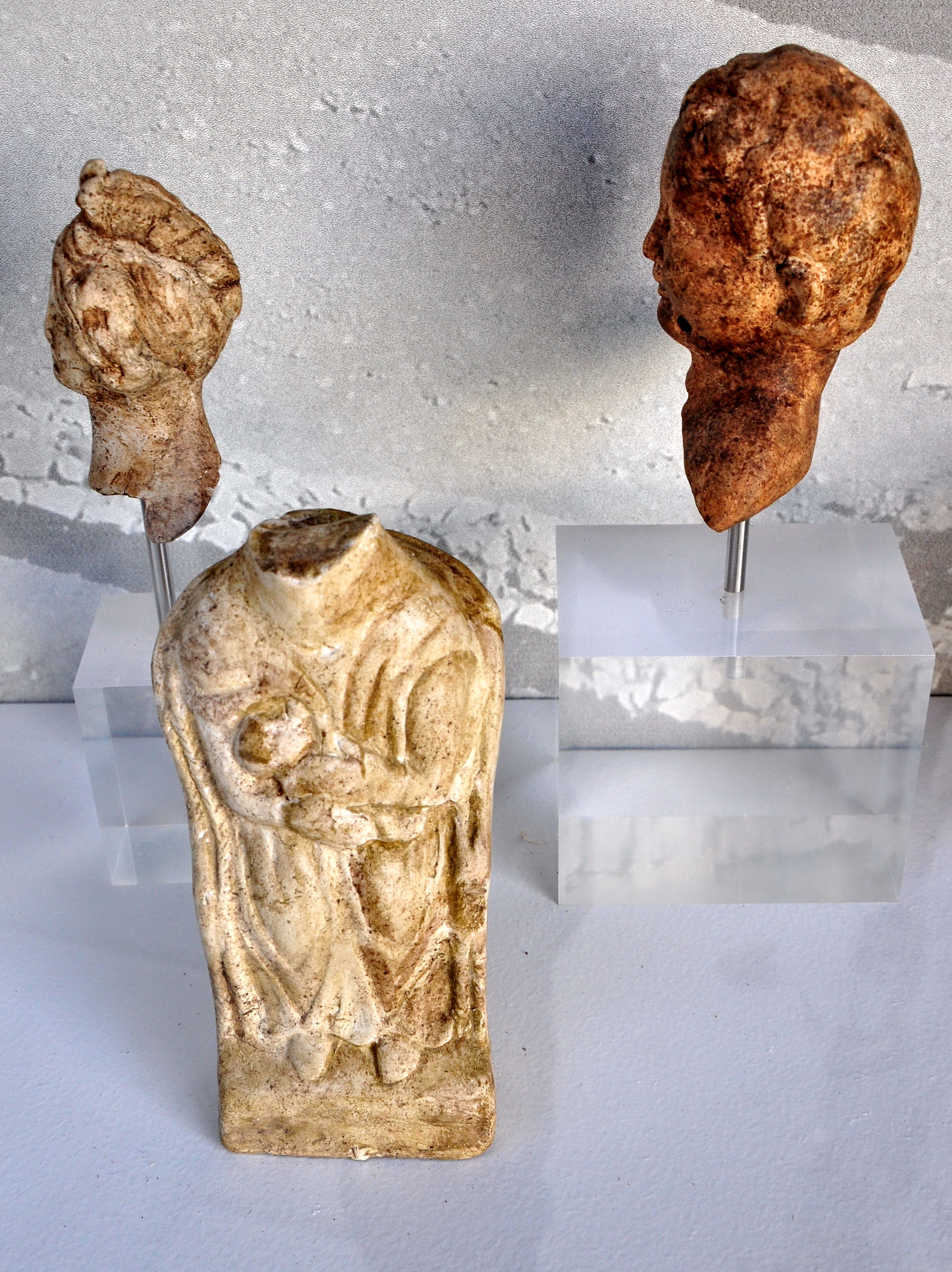
Gallo-Roman relicts at Heimatmuseum in Rapperswil

Settlements in the region of Rapperswil-Jona date back at least 5000 years. Aerchological relicts have been found at the site of a Bronze Age village, and the remains of a first wooden bridge (16th century BC, reconstructed in 2001) to Hurden (SZ) located at the Seedamm area of Rapperswil, being part of the 111 serial sites of the UNESCO World Heritage Site Prehistoric pile dwellings around the Alps, of which are 56 located in Switzerland.

Among the highlights of archaeological relicts include the Neolithic Seegubel site and La Tène culture body burials which indicates an early settlement. Linguists are speculating whether a Helvetiic settlement Cambioratin (bay hill) has been established on the so-called Kempratnerbucht. Beginning in the 1st century AD, the Roman vicus Centum Prata (100 meadows) has been an important Roman settlement to secure the province borders, and was both a stage town on the intersection of the streets to Zürich (Latin Turicum), Winterthur (Vitudurum) via Irgenhausen (Irgenhausen Castrum) and to Chur (Curia Rhaetorum) to Rome's alpine route. Centum prata was an economic center for the surrounding area, too, a residential and commercial area for artisans, traders, boatmen and carters living in it. It measured about 300 metres (984 ft) form north to south and 200 metres (656 ft) from west to east, including massive stone buildings, half-timbered and simple wooden houses. At Kempraten's Lake Zurich bay, the Roman transshipment harbour for goods was located that have been transported on the Roman streets, on the lake bridge from Rapperswil to Hurden and on the waterway Zürichsee-Obersee-Linth-Walensee. From here respectively the so-called Einsiedlerhaus in Rapperswil, there was probably a boat route to the Gallo-Roman sanctuary on Ufenau island. After the Alamannic invasion and withdrawal of the Roman administration to Italy around the year 401 (488), the Gallo-Roman, probably Christianized population has been still living there.

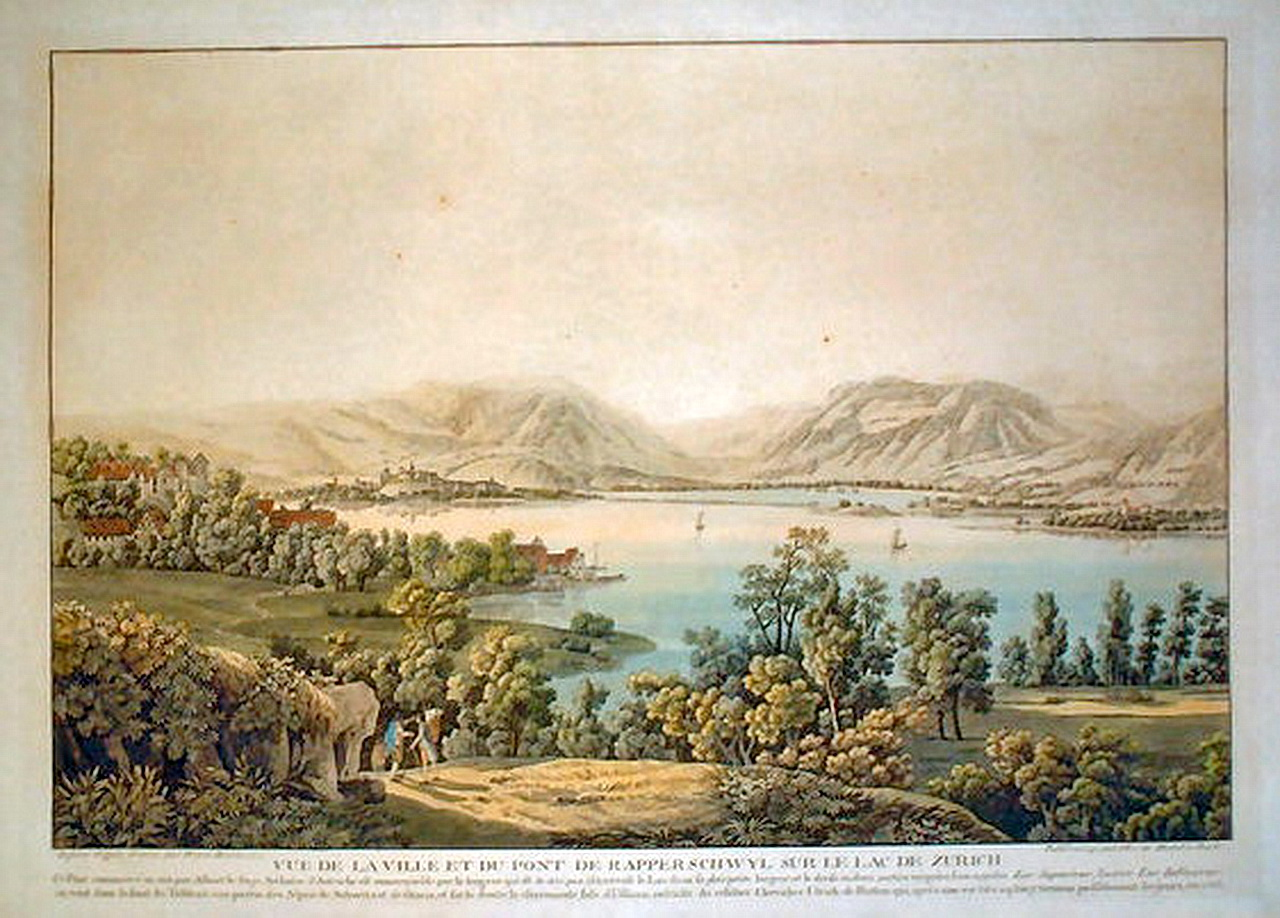
Rapperswil, Kempraten, Holzbrücke Rapperswil-Hurden and upper Lake Zürich (1791)

In 741 and 744, documents in the archives of St. Gallen Abbey describe the village as Centoprato, another document in 863 as Centiprata, inspired by the Latin name Centum Prata. According to a 9th-century document, Kempraten was a well known pilgrimage site with relics of the martyr Alexander (legend of Theban Legion). Around 847 legends tell of a pilgrimage basilica with a priest in Kentibruto, estimated to be the St. Ursula chapel built around 885. At the beginning of the 13th century, Kempraten was part of the Herrschaft Rapperswil by the Counts of Rapperswil. In 1253 it was part of the former parish church Busskirch. Today, this old Christian community belongs to the Catholic parish Rapperswil-Jona. In his chronicle, Aegidius Tschudi (he also mentions a stone with Roman inscriptions near Jona) in 1443 (Old Zürich War) mentions as military troops from the Old Swiss Confederacy cantons of Uri, Zug and Glarus, fighting against Rapperswil, had their camp at the street to the Rüti Abbey. Beginning 1803, Kempraten was part of the former municipality Jona. On 1 January 2007 the former municipalities of Rapperswil and Jona merged to form a new political entity: Rapperswil-Jona that became the second largest town in the canton after the capital St. Gallen itself.

Aerial view from 200 m by Walter Mittelholzer (1930)

== Transportation ==
Kempraten railway station is a stop of the Zürich S-Bahn on the line S7. It is a 36-minute ride from Zürich Hauptbahnhof and three minutes to Rapperswil train station. The station is also served by municipal bus line 994 of Stadtbus Rapperswil-Jona (provided by the Verkehrsbetriebe Zürichsee und Oberland, VZO) and VZO bus route 885 (operates between Rapperswil and Atzmännig, via Rüti ZH, Wald ZH and Goldingen).

== Heritage sites of national significance ==
The area of the remains of the Vicus Centum Prata, the historical lake crossings and the Neolithic settlement Seegubel are listed as Swiss inventory of cultural property of national and regional significance as Class A objects of national importance.

== Literature ==
- Georg Matter: Die Römersiedlung Kempraten und ihre Umgebung. Published by Gemeinde Jona, Jona 2003, ISBN 9783908006688.
- Lukas Gschwend: Kempraten vor 1250 Jahren – Ein Beitrag zur ersten schriftlichen Nennung im Jahre 741. Verlag der Kulturkommission der Gemeinde Jona, 1991.
- Eugen Halter: Geschichte der Gemeinde Jona. Schweizer Verlagshaus, Zürich 1970.
