= Feldbach, Switzerland =

Village in Hombrechtikon, Switzerland

Coordinates: 47.240°N 8.786°E

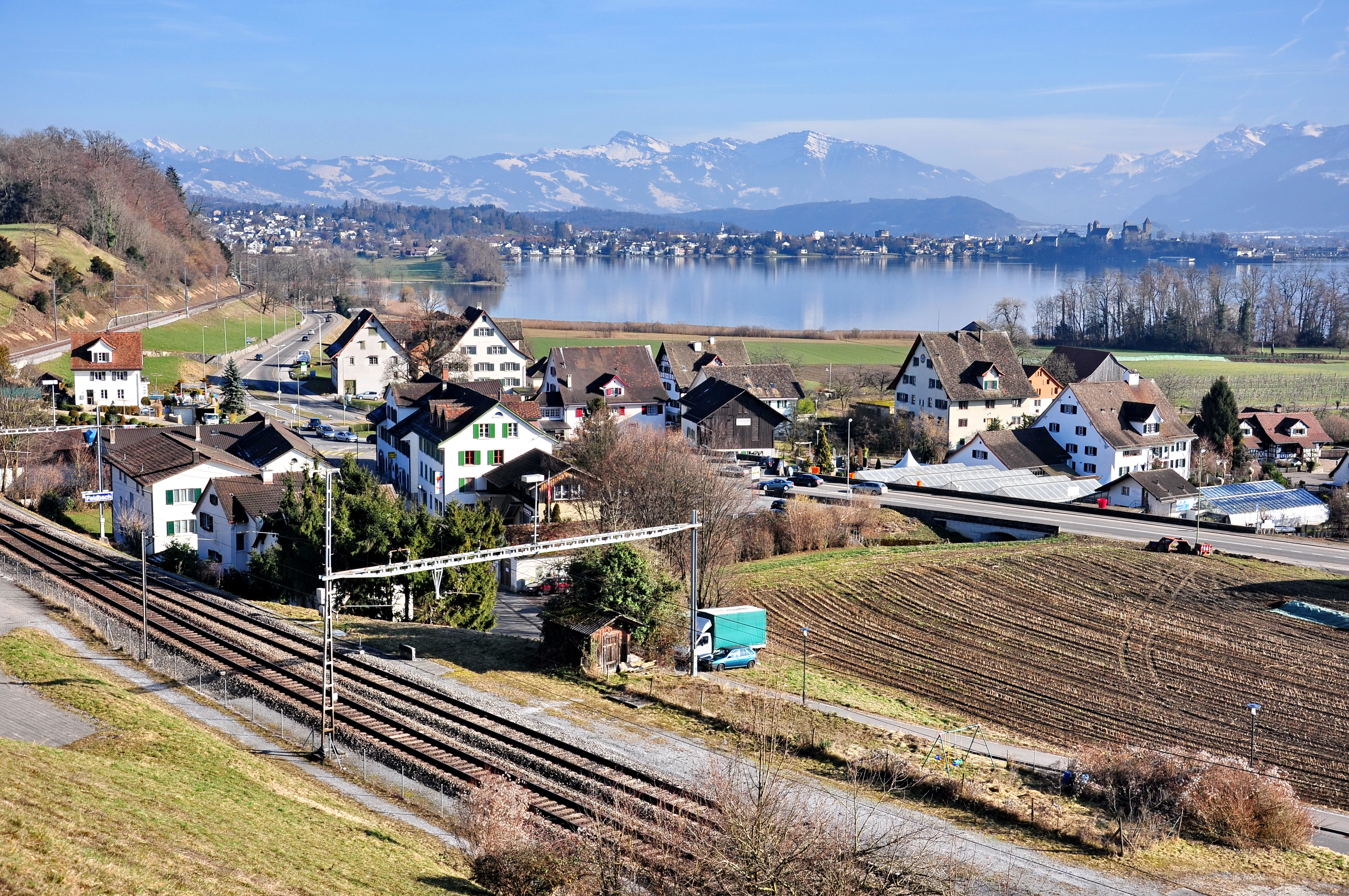
Feldbach on Zürichsee lake shore, Rapperswil and bay of Kempraten in the background

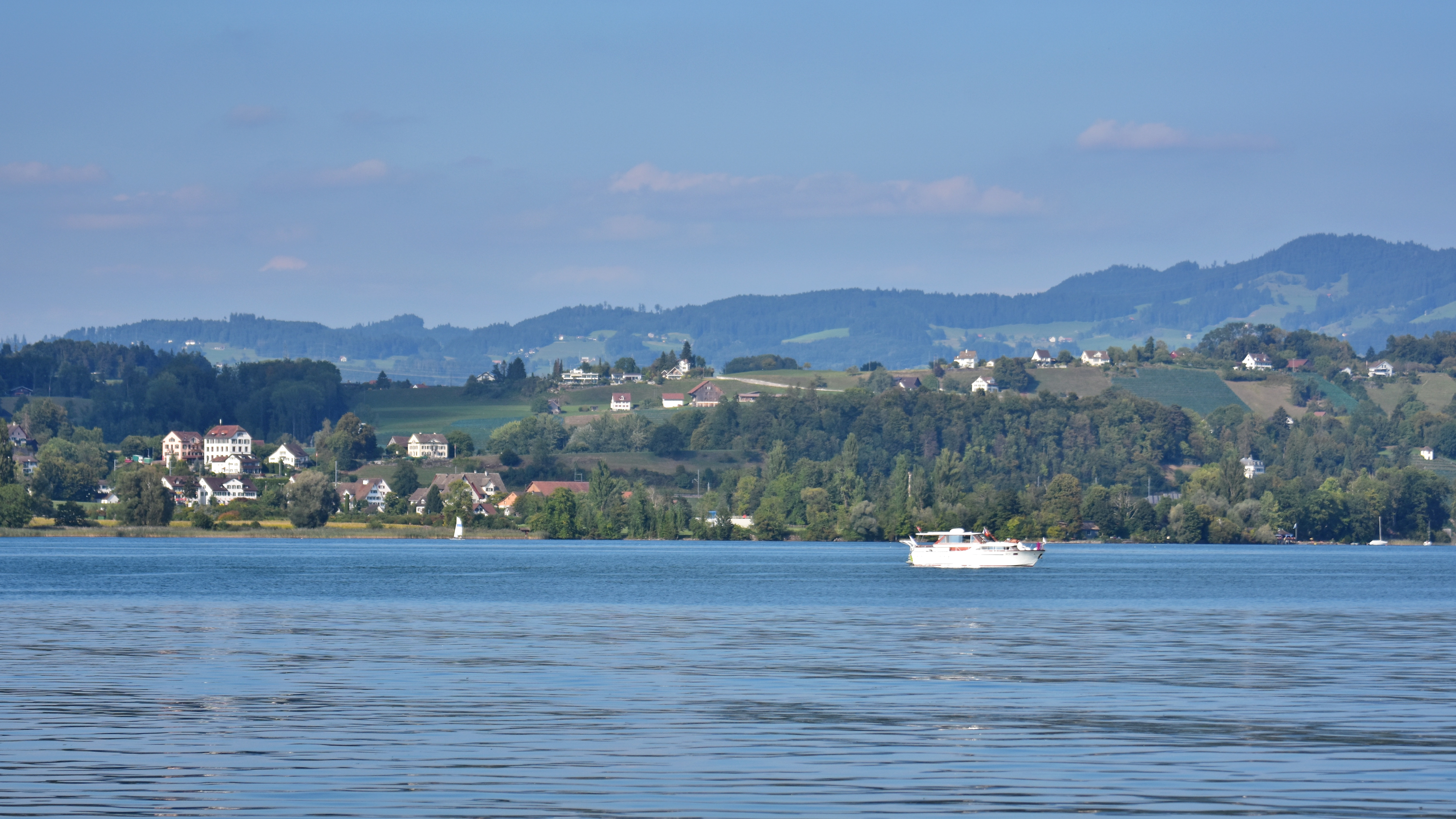
Feldbach as seen from Zürichsee-Schifffahrtsgesellschaft (ZSG) ship MS Helvetia on Zürichsee

Feldbach (Swiss Standard German pronunciation: [ˈfɛldbax]) is a village near Rapperswil, Switzerland. It is located on the north bank of the lake of Zurich and is part of the political municipality of Hombrechtikon. In the local dialect it is called Fäldbach.

== Geography ==
Situated on Zürichsee lake shore, Feldbach is neighboured by Kempraten, nearby the Seedamm, an isthmus between the Zürichsee and the Obersee lake area.

== Cultural Heritage ==
The Prehistoric pile dwelling site Feldbach is located about 3km away from the prehistoric lake crossings that are documented by finds at the Hurden Rosshorn site.

== Notable people ==
- Thomas Frischknecht, Swiss cyclist

== Transportation ==
Feldbach railway station is a stop of the S-Bahn Zürich on the line S7.
