= Alt Rapperswil Castle =

Altendorf; Alt-Rapperswil
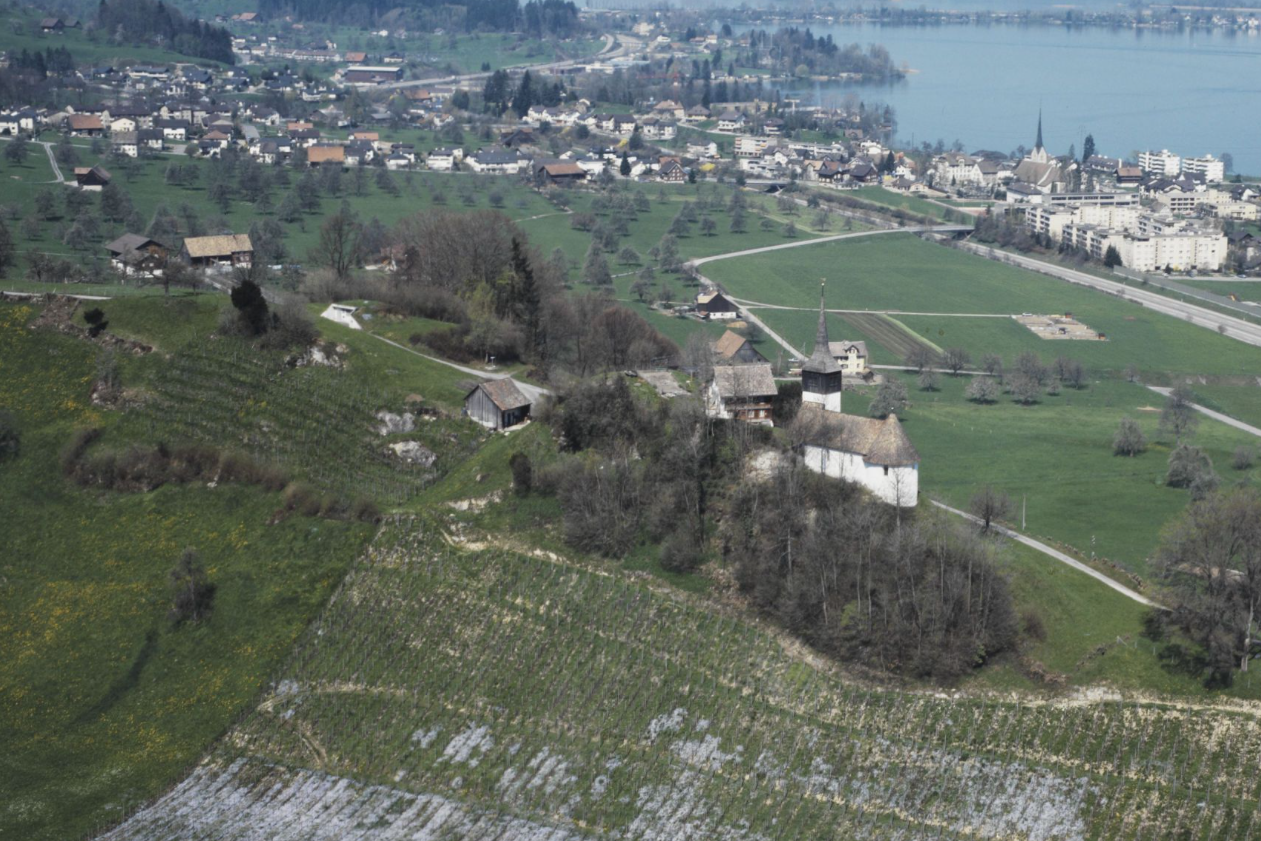
- Castle site with Altendorf and Lake Zürich in the background

- Location within Switzerland

General information
- Classification: ruined historic monument
- Location: Altendorf, Switzerland
- Coordinates: 47.184953°N 8.841181°E
- Construction started: before 1200 AD
- Completed: unknown; destroyed in 1350 AD

Altendorf Castle (Swiss German: Ruine Altendorf) was a medieval hill castle in the municipality of Altendorf in the canton of Schwyz. On the foundation of the round castle chapel stands the choir of the chapel of St. Johann.

== Geography ==
The ruins respectively a chapel built at the castle's former location is situated on the western lake shore of Obersee on a ridge towards the mountain called Etzel in Altendorf. The castle overlooked the Linth plain and the upper part of the Lake Zurich. The village of Lachen is situated below the hill on the shore of the lake, although the castle site is on the ground of the municipality of Altendorf. The castle site is accessible by car, parking lots are nearby. Hiking trails lead from the boat landing Altendorf Seestatt and from the railway station Lachen to the castle site.

== History ==
"Rahprehteswilare" is mentioned for the first time in a document of emperor Otto II, in which goods of the Einsiedeln Abbey in the location of today's Altendorf were confirmed on 14 August 972. Rahprehteswilare means hamlet or village of Raprecht, named after a probably Alemanni nobleman in the 7th or 8th century AD. The House of Rapperswil had estates in central and eastern Switzerland, more precisely around the upper Lake Zurich and the later silt up Lake Tuggen, in the Zürcher Oberland and in the Glattal.

The Counts of Rapperswil acted as Vögte of the Einsiedeln Abbey since the 11th century AD, as therefore the castle may have been built as seat of the Vogt, in addition to the nearby later fortification in Pfäffikon, that was owned by the Einsiedeln abbey – the exact date of construction is unknown. The establishment of the present Rapperswil was founden around 1200 AD. It became the new seat of the House of Rapperswil and the village with the church of St. Michael was renamed "vetus villa Rapperswile" (literally: old town Rapperswil) and the castle was called "die vestize der alten Rapreswile" (literally: the fortress of the old House of Rapperswil). To the middle of the 15th century AD, for the first time the name "zu dem alten Dorfe" (literally: to the old village) was mentioned from which the name "Altendorf" (literally: old village) arose.

When the castle was completed is unknown. From the previously known, patchy history of the House of Rapperswil only conjectures may done: Certainly it was built well before the year 1200 AD, maybe in 972 or earlier, from which the aforementioned document dates. However, the castle was destroyed along with the Rapperswil Castle by Rudolf Brun's troops in 1350, as an attempted coup called 'Mordnacht von Zürich' (literally: Murder night of Zurich) failed. It was an upheaval of the aristocratic opposition which attempted to reverse the guild order of the city of Zurich introduced by Brun. A central person was Count Johann II of the House of Habsburg-Laufenburg, who wanted to revenge his father's death at the Battle of Grynau.

The destruction of Alt-Rapperswil followed a siege of the castle in September 1350, in which allied troops from Constance and St. Gallen took part in addition to the troops of Zurich. According to the chronicle, the 30 inhabitants were given safe conduct after five days of siege and the walls were then brought down by undermining, which was confirmed by the excavations in 1972.

Thus, Rapperswil was rebuilt by Albrecht II, Duke of Austria in 1352/54. Of Alt Rapperswil only the chapel was rebuilt. Contrary to the records of the chronicler Aegidius Tschudi from the 16th century, it had also been destroyed, which was proven by the excavations in 1972. Habsburg influence in the March District was lost in 1386 after the Battle of Sempach, and the property and its rights passed over to the city of Zurich.

== Castle ==
The exact location of Alt-Rapperswil was long unknown. It could only be confirmed during the renovation of the chapel of St. Johann when soundings revealed an extensive medieval fortification. The ridge castle occupied an area of 100 × 35 metres on the ridge. The levelled moat, up to eight metres deep on the north and east sides, and the neck ditch on the west side are still faintly visible. The chapel of St. Johann and the Sigristenhaus (Sacristan's House) are located on the former castle grounds.

The choir of the Chapel of St. John, which is seven-eighths closed, stands on an approximately 70 cm wide foundation of a former round tower of the castle. It is assumed that the chapel was modelled on the Church of the Holy Sepulchre in Jerusalem to commemorate the crusades and pilgrimages of the House of Rapperswil, because during the excavations a foundation was found which could be the remains of an altar pedestal. The rapid reconstruction of the chapel after its destruction in 1350 is evidenced by a Gothic double window, as can also be found in other buildings from the 1370s in the region.

Under the nave of the present chapel of St. John, a wall segment running parallel to the ridge was found with two door sills embedded in it. To the east of the choir of the present chapel on a terrace seven metres below, a square foundation of 3.4 metres edge length was found, surrounded by a fire layer in which remains of stove tiles were found. A one and a half metre thick curtain wall must have surrounded the site.

The chapel and the ruined remains are a Swiss heritage site of national significance as Class A objects of national importance.

== See also ==
- Rapperswil Castle
- House of Rapperswil

== Literature ==
- Roger Sablonier: Gründungszeit ohne Eidgenossen: Politik und Gesellschaft in der Innerschweiz um 1300. hier + jetzt, Baden 2008, ISBN 978-3-03919-085-0.
