= Ritterhaus Bubikon =

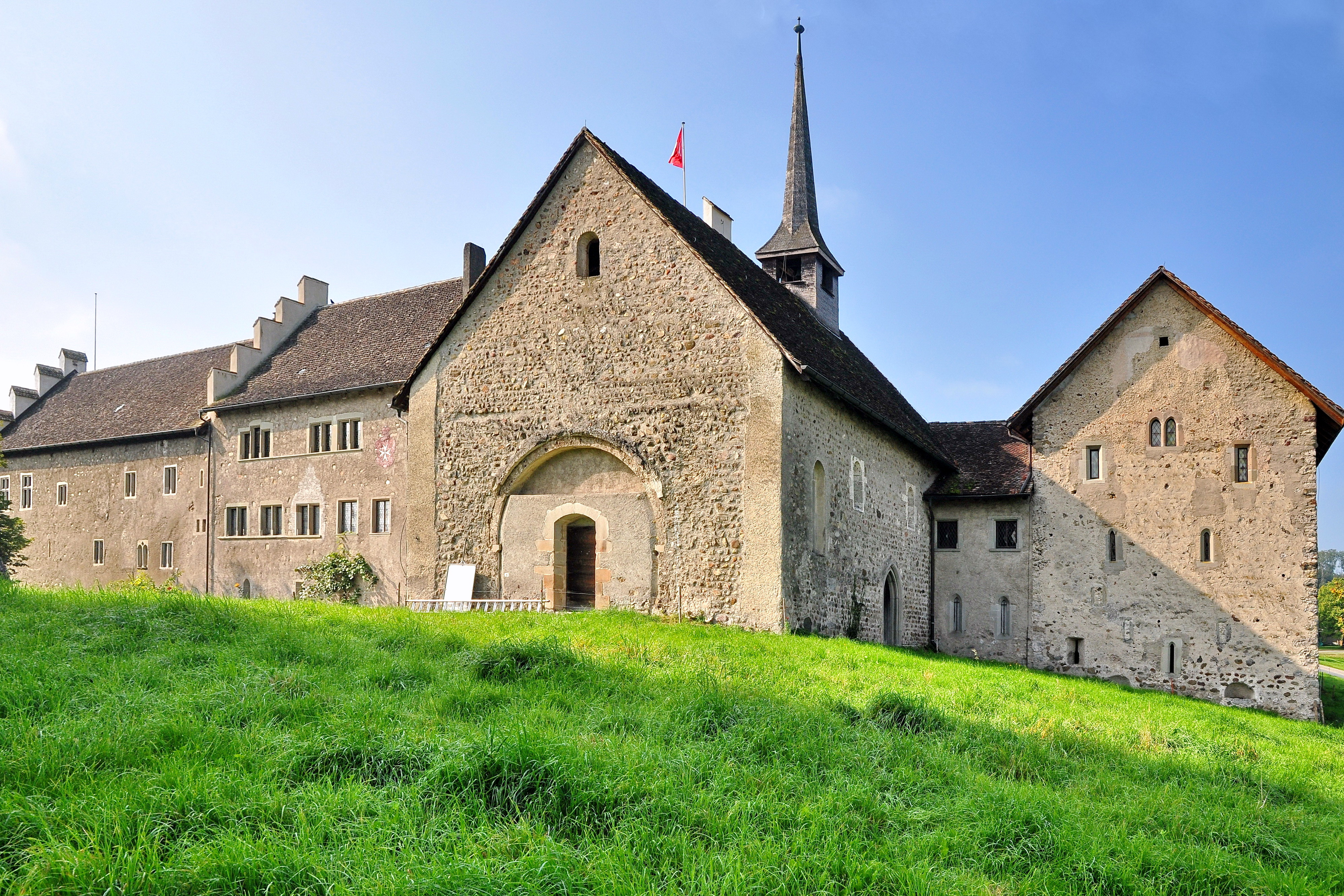
- Ritterhaus as seen from the northeast

- Location within Canton of Zürich Ritterhaus Bubikon (Switzerland)

General information
- Architectural style: Commandery, a medieval monastery of the Knights Hospitaller
- Classification: Historic monument used also as a history museum, nearly completely reserved, conserved and renewed in 1947, and partially renewed in 1993/95, 2000 and 2011.
- Location: Bubikon, Switzerland
- Coordinates: 47.26667°N 8.82805°E
- Construction started: 1192 AD

Bubikon Castle or Bubikon Commandery (German: Ritterhaus Bubikon) is a castle in the municipality of Bubikon of the Swiss Canton of Zürich. The former Commandery, a medieval monastery of the Knights Hospitaller, is a Swiss heritage site of national significance.

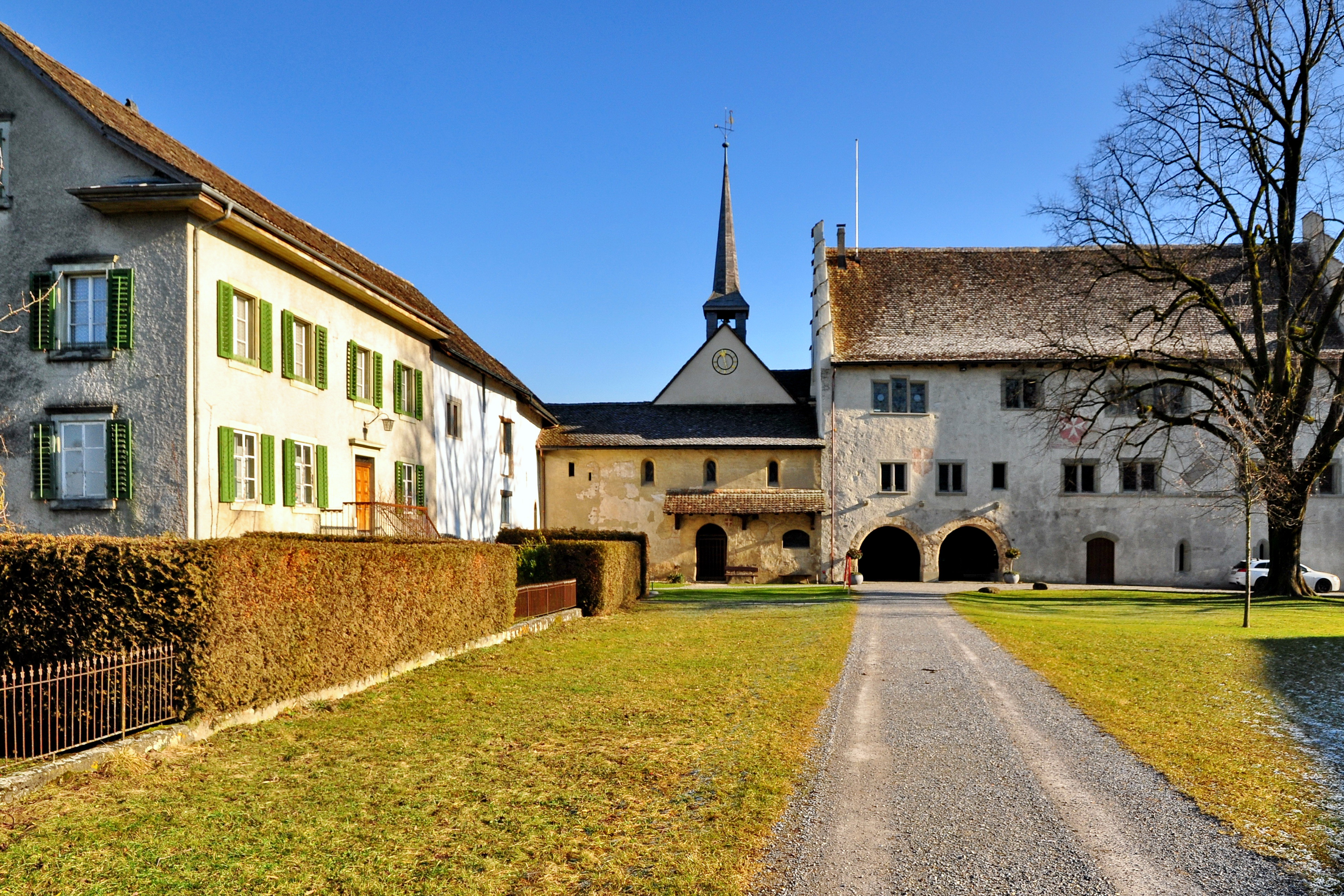
Ritterhaus Bubikon

== History ==
Assumably in compensation of claims related to the Alt-Rapperswil lands and rights, a change of goods occurred between the Counts of Toggenburg and Counts of Rapperswil probably in the early 1190s. To end the disputes about the legacy, the Knights Hospitaller abbey and commandry was given by Diethelm V von Toggenburg and Vogt Rudolf von Rapperswil between 1191 and 1198 AD. Although in concurrency to the neighbouring Rüti Abbey, the commandery's lands and goods grew with donations by local noble families during the 13th and 14th centuries – at the height of their power, the commandry owned land all over the present canton of Zürich.

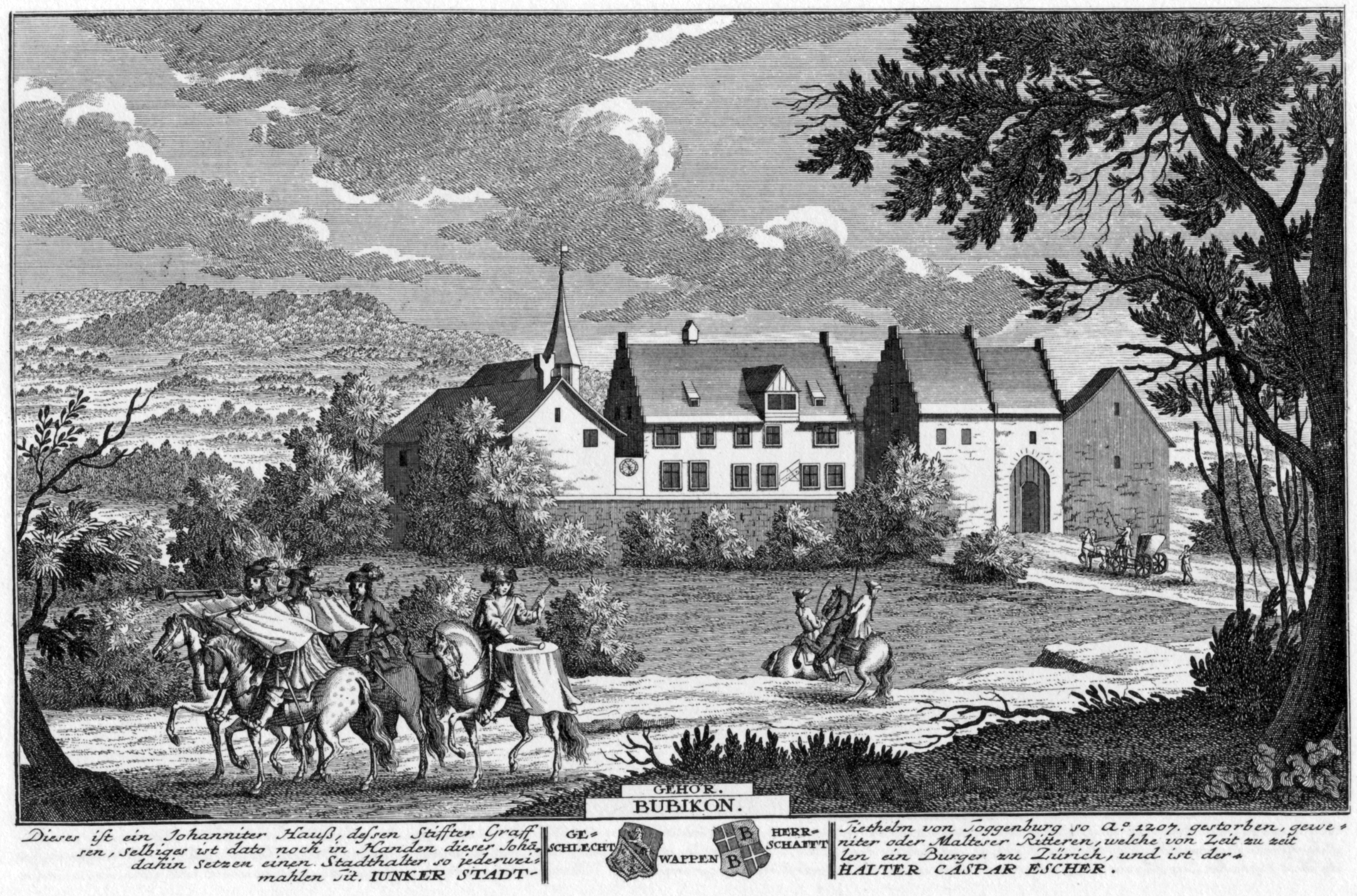
Bubikon commandry in 1742, drawing by David Herrliberger

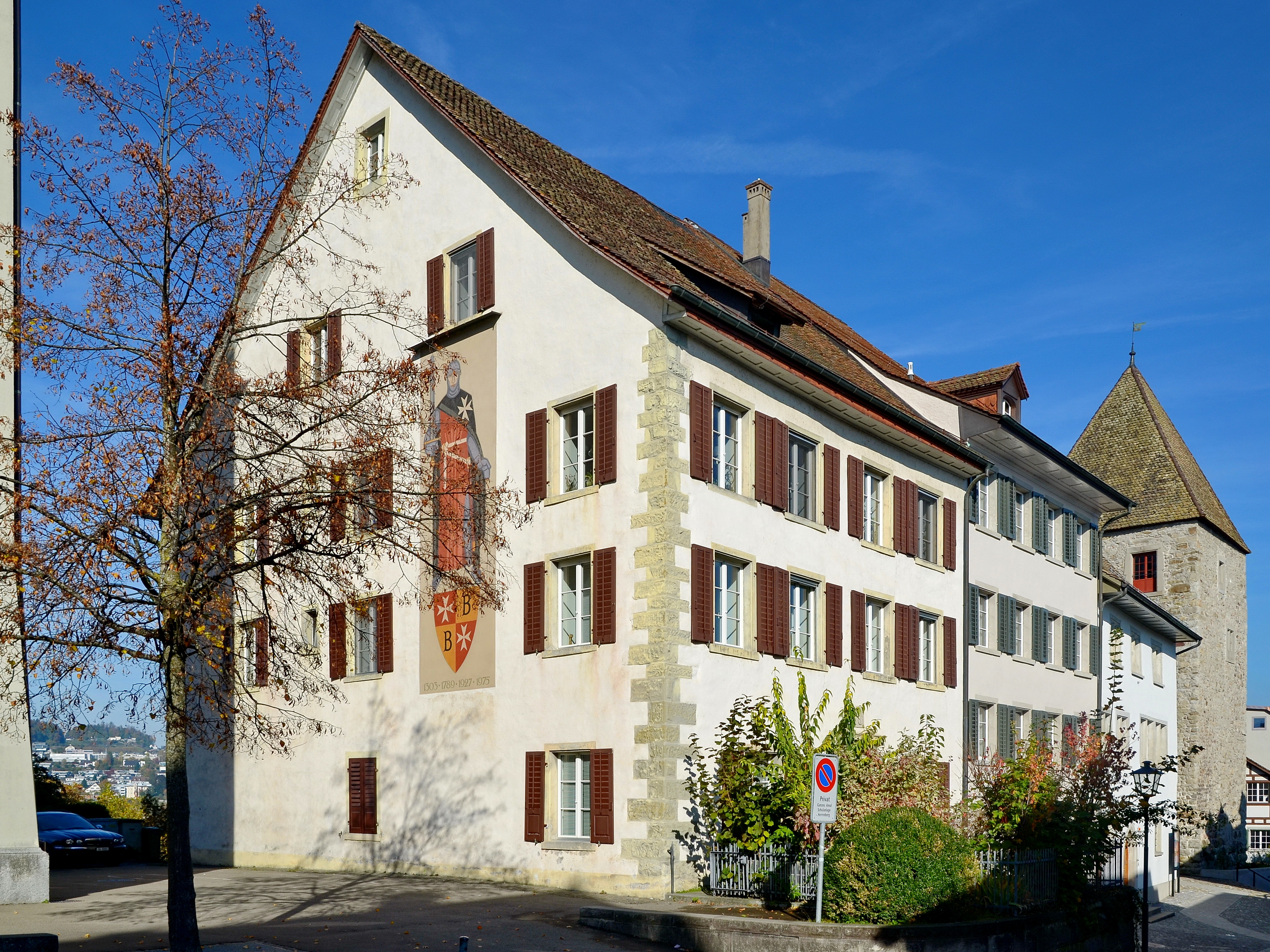
so-called Bubikerhaus of the convent in Rapperswil, adjacent to the Brenyhaus nearby the Rapperswil Castle

The commandry's inhabitants was granted Burgrecht by the neighbouring town of Rapperswil, later by the city of Zürich. During the Reformation in Zürich and the riots in the Herrschaft Grüningen against the feudal owners of the lands cultivated by the farmers and their families, Johannes Stumpf, the prior of the commandry at the time, supported its secularization and those of the neighbouring Rüti Abbey in spring 1525. The lands partially became the property of the city of Zürich when the convent was secularized in 1528 (convent) respectively 1798 (commandry).

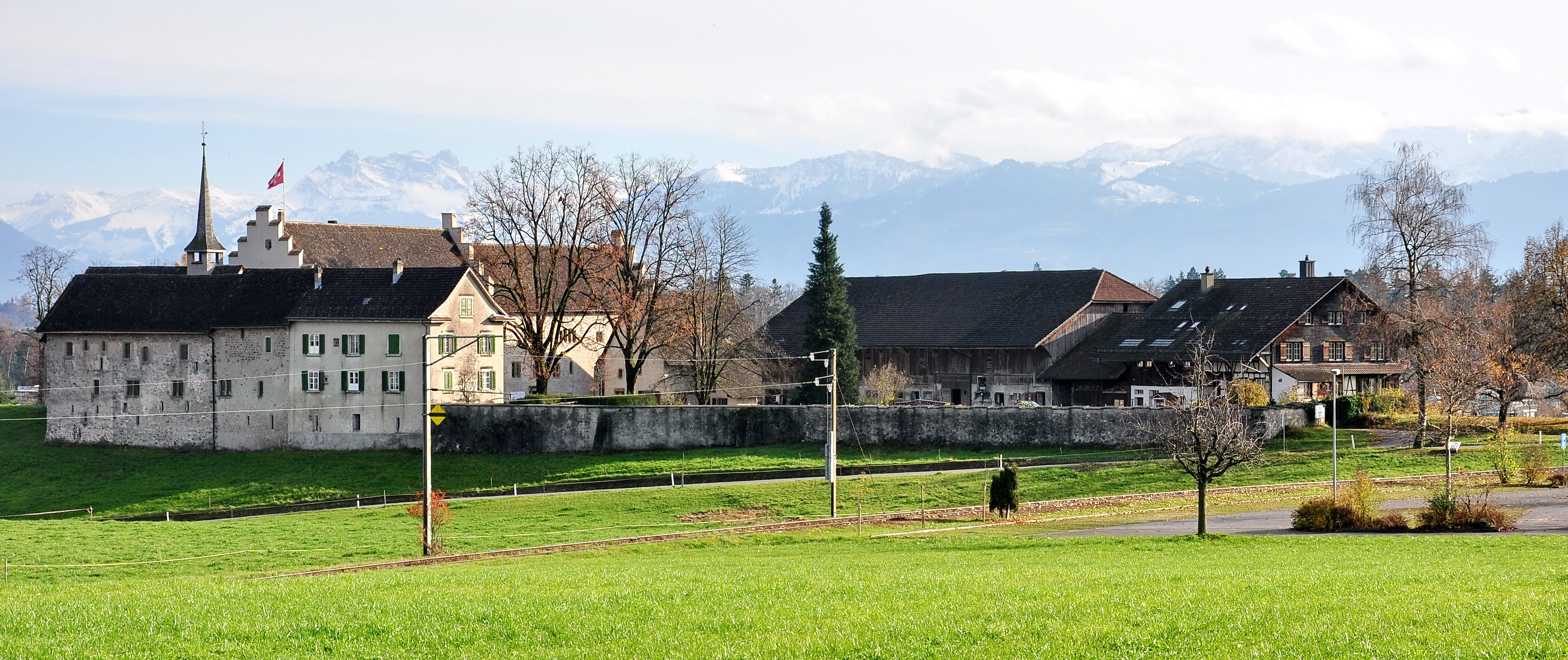

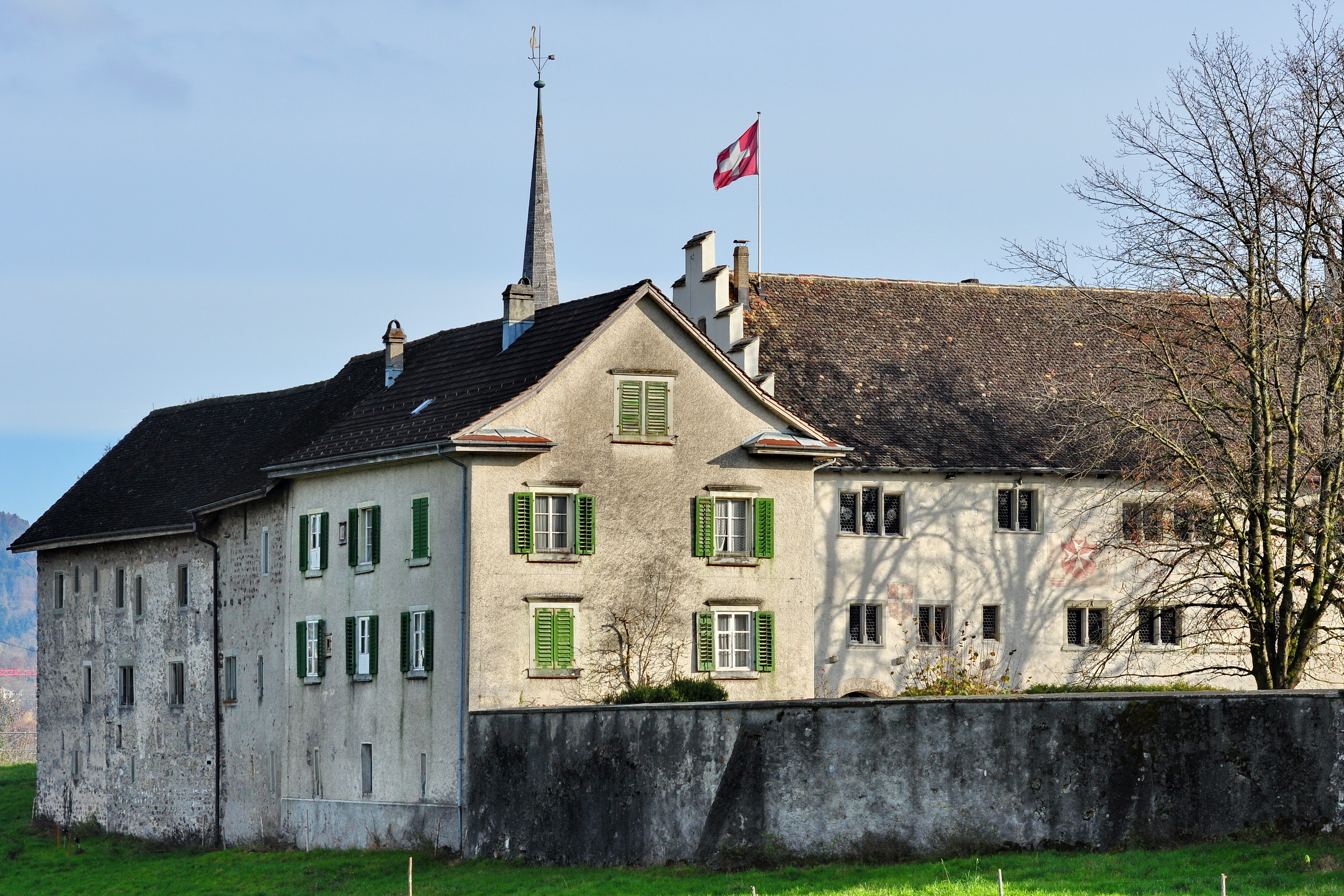

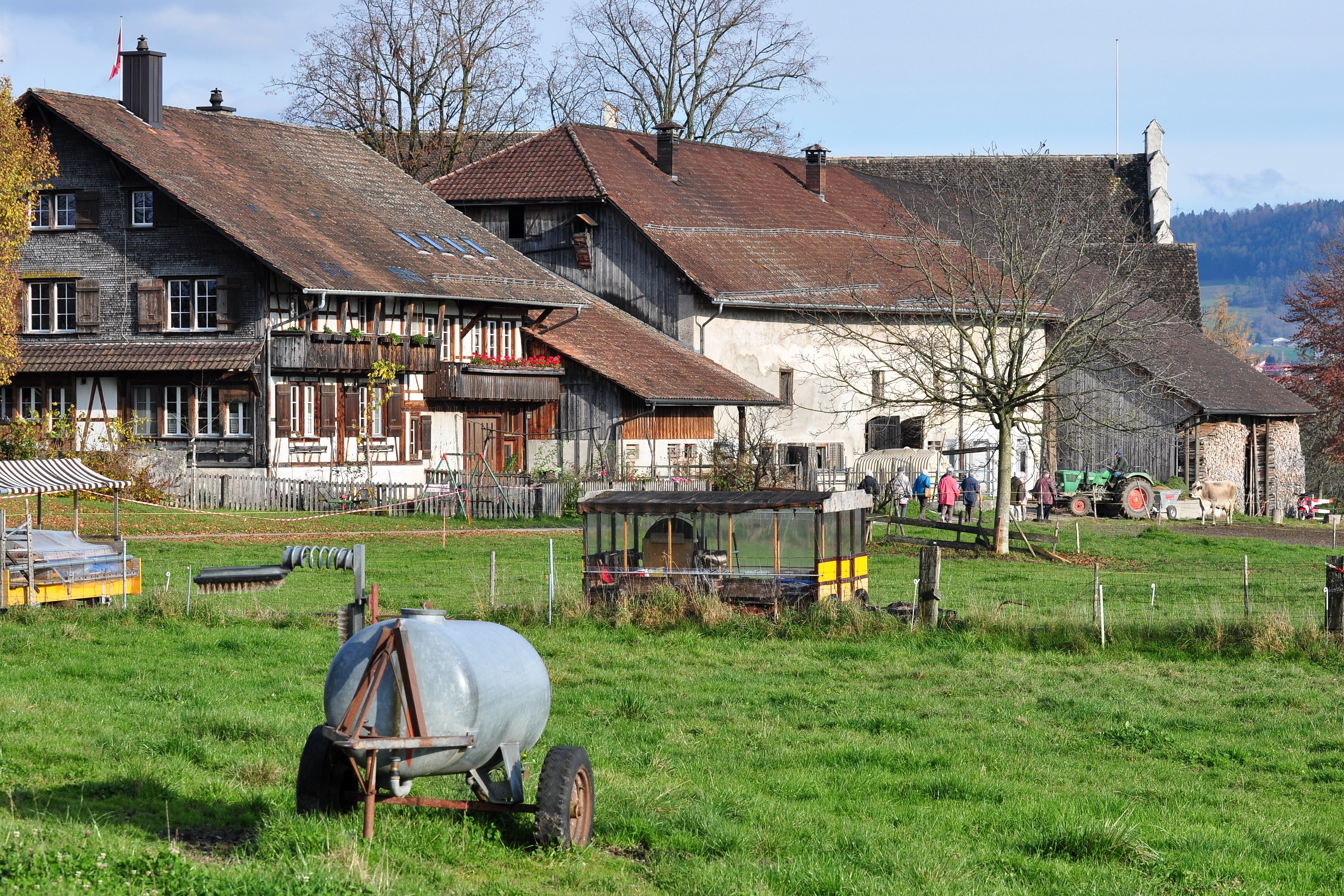

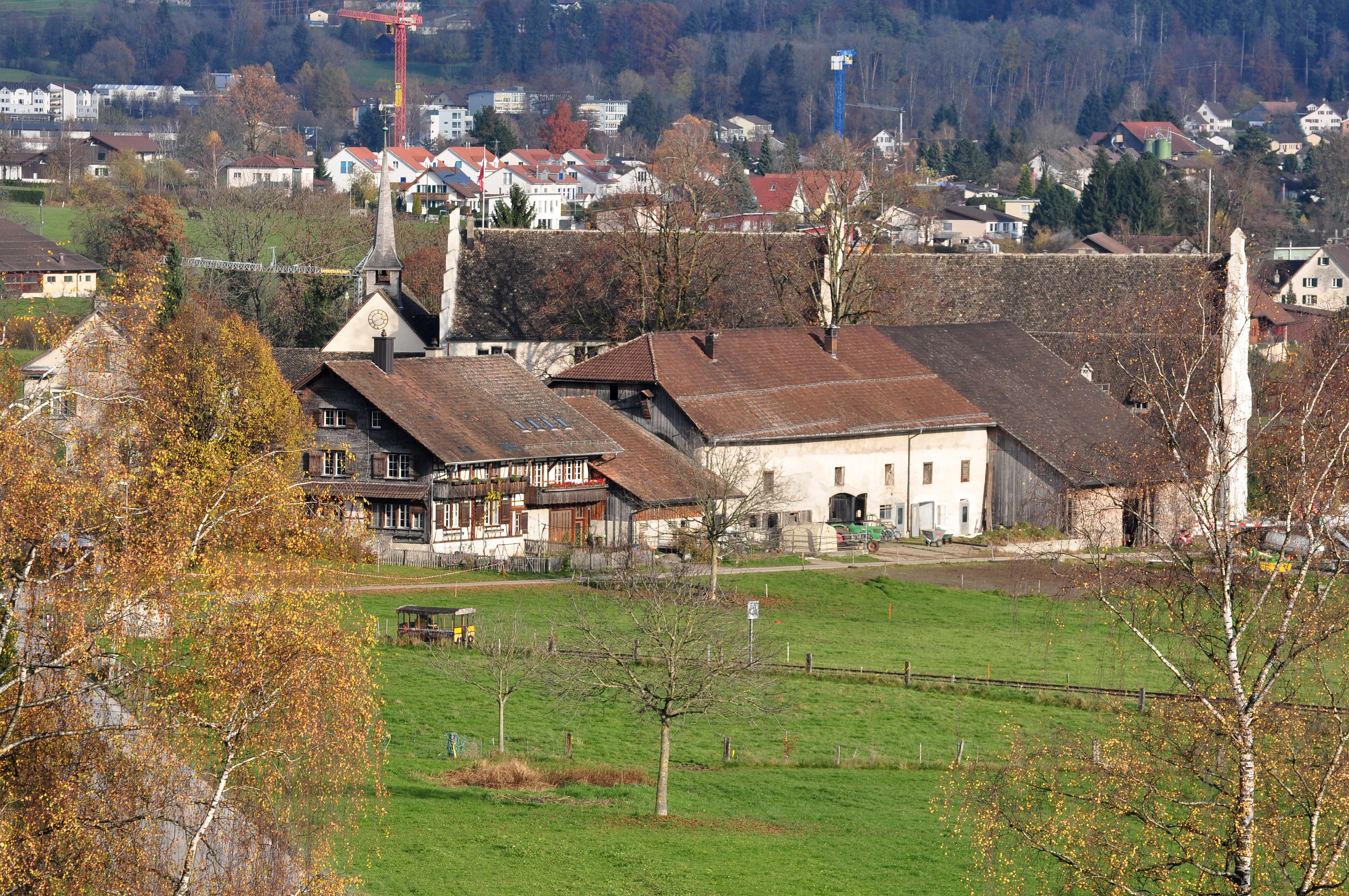

== Buildings ==
In 1936 respectively 1938 the Ritterhausgesellschaft (Ritterhaus society) took over the management of the building complex, and the society today provides the museum related to the castle's and the order's history. The buildings of the commandry were completely renewed in 1947, and the chapel between 1993 and 1995. In 2000 the museum was redesigned, and a herbal garden (German: Epochen-Kräutergarten) was established and the exterior partially renewed in 2011. The adjacent farm and barn buildings are excluded from the Ritterhaus building complex, as they still are used as a privately cultivated farm.

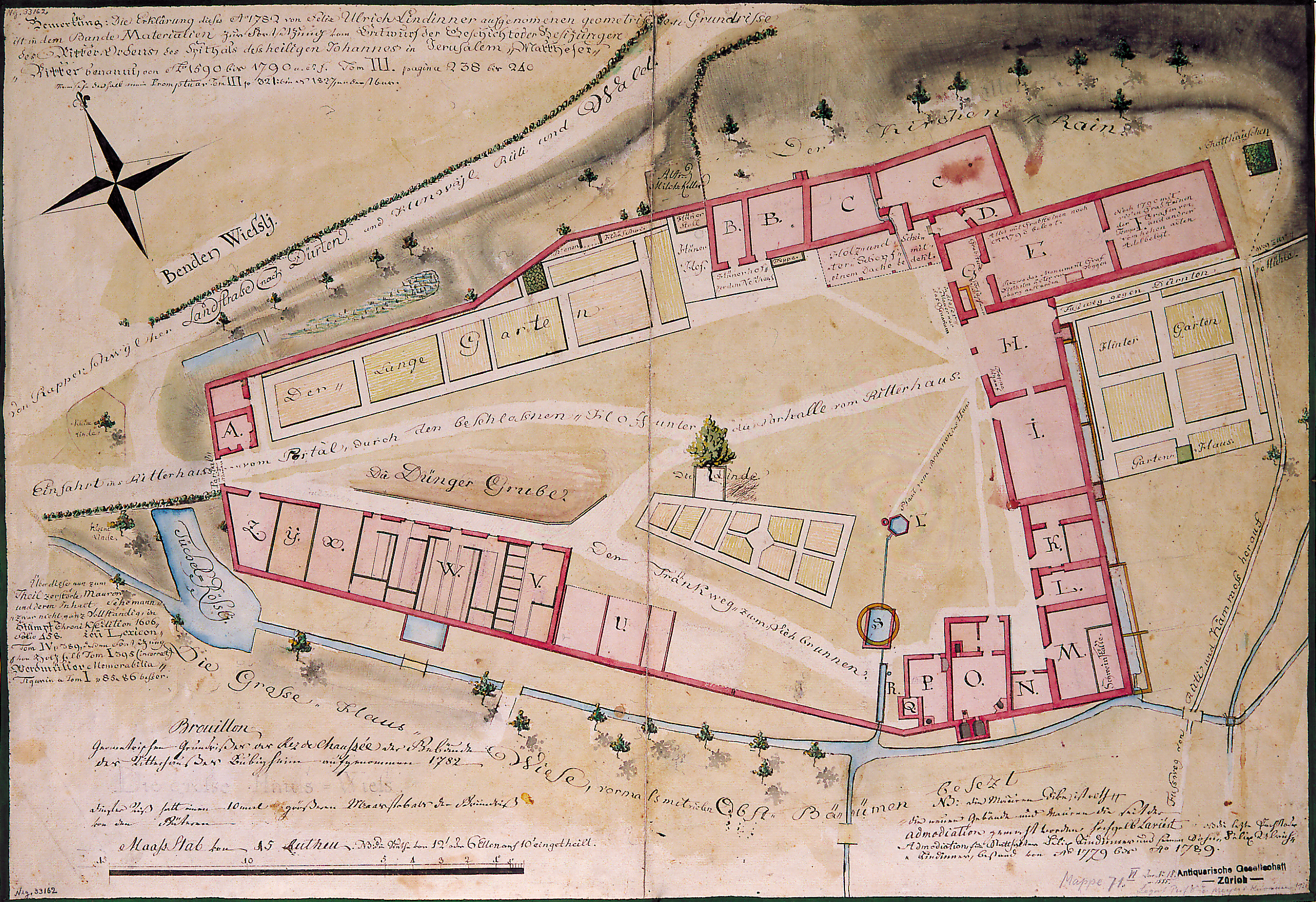
1782 map of the Bubikon commandery

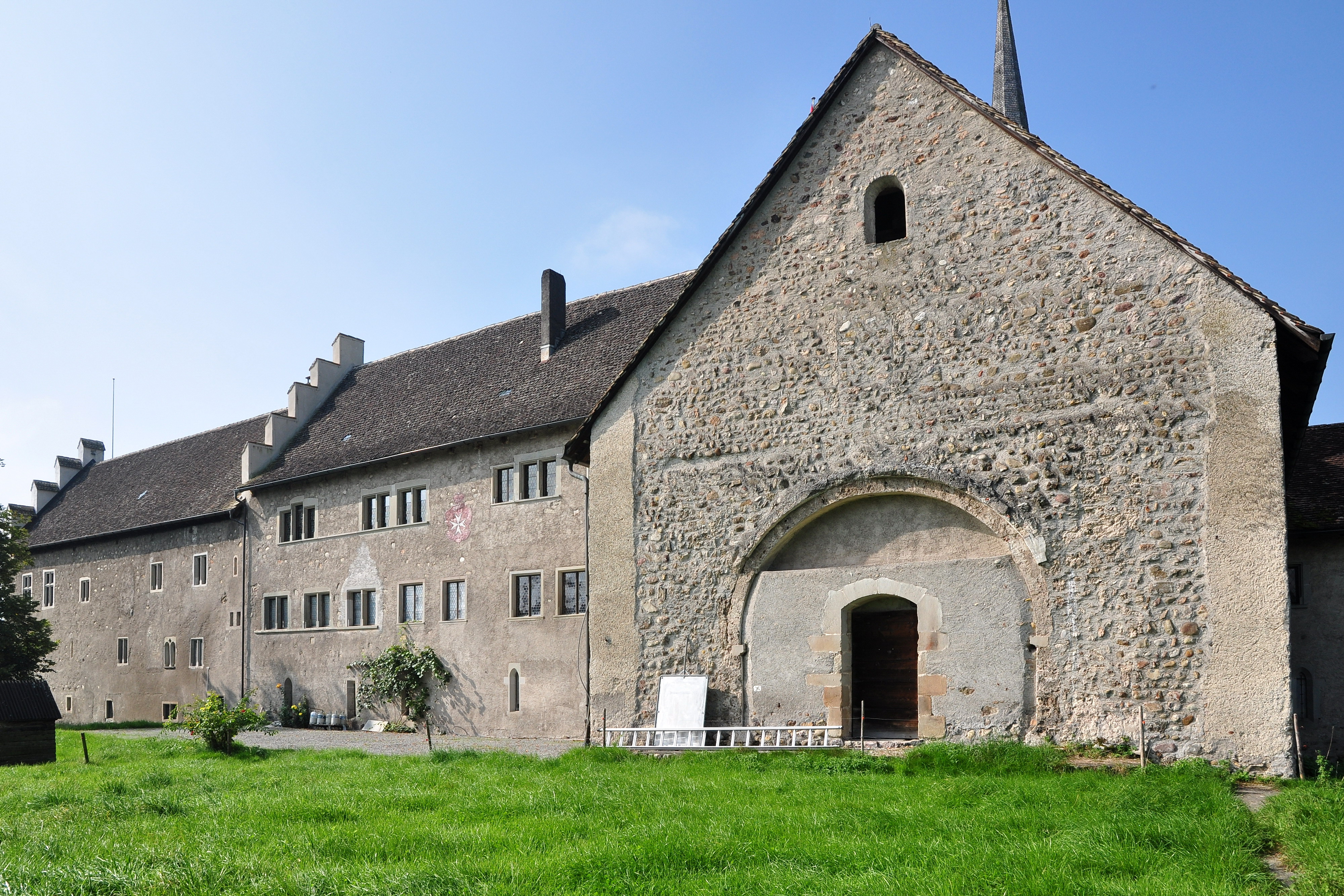

The Ritterhaus building complex consists of the commander's house, the rectory, the Schütte and Sennhaus buildings, the so-called Bruderhaus being the oldest building, the 12th-century chapel of St. John the Baptist (dated 1192 AD), as well as the adjacent farm and economic buildings. The brothers’ house (Bruderhaus) and the chapel are the oldest buildings of the commandery and were probably built in the early 1190s, assumably incorporating an older building (maybe a chapel) that was built by the Toggenburg family. The 14th-century Romanesque nave of the chapel was expanded by a Gothic chancel that was destroyed in 1819. The remains of Romanesque mural paintings date back to the first half of the 13th century. They illustrate the foundation of the commonly named Ritterhaus building complex by the Toggenburg and Rapperswil families, and display scenes of the live of Saint John the Baptist. The chapel was desecrated and secularised during the Reformation in Zürich. The main building (Haupthaus), serving as the commander's house and administration complex, and the adjacent wing (Ritterhausflügel) were added between the 13th and 15th century; after the Reformation it was the seat of the local governor, a city council member from Zürich. The representative rooms were used for official purposes, and therefore richly decorated in the Renaissance style in 1570. At the same time, the coats of arms of the Knights of Malta was painted onto the façade towards the courtyard. The servants' house (Sennhaus, Gesindehaus) was built around 1480 and rebuilt in 1570 for the purpose of the production of cheese.

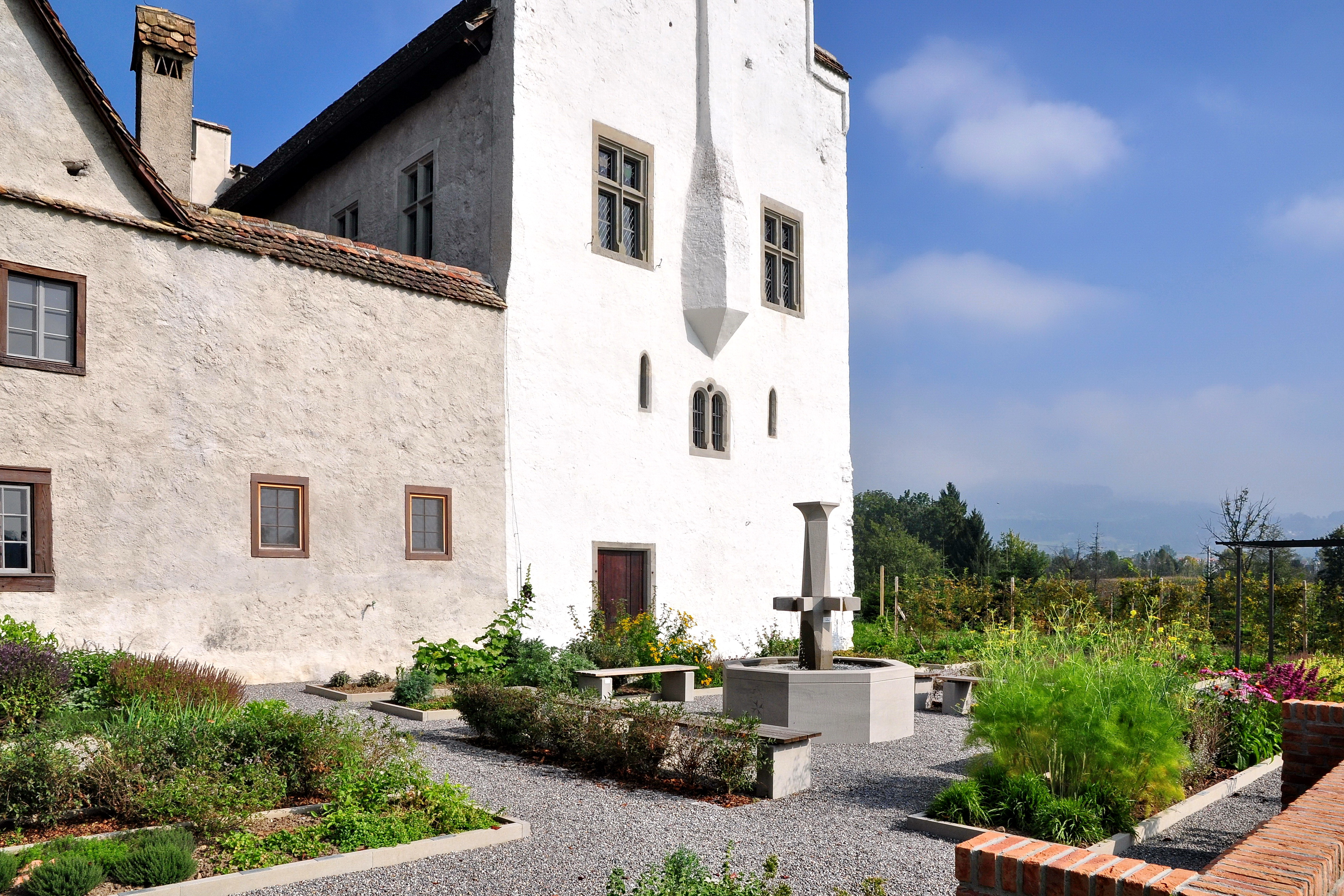
herb garden on the southern side of the Gesindehaus building

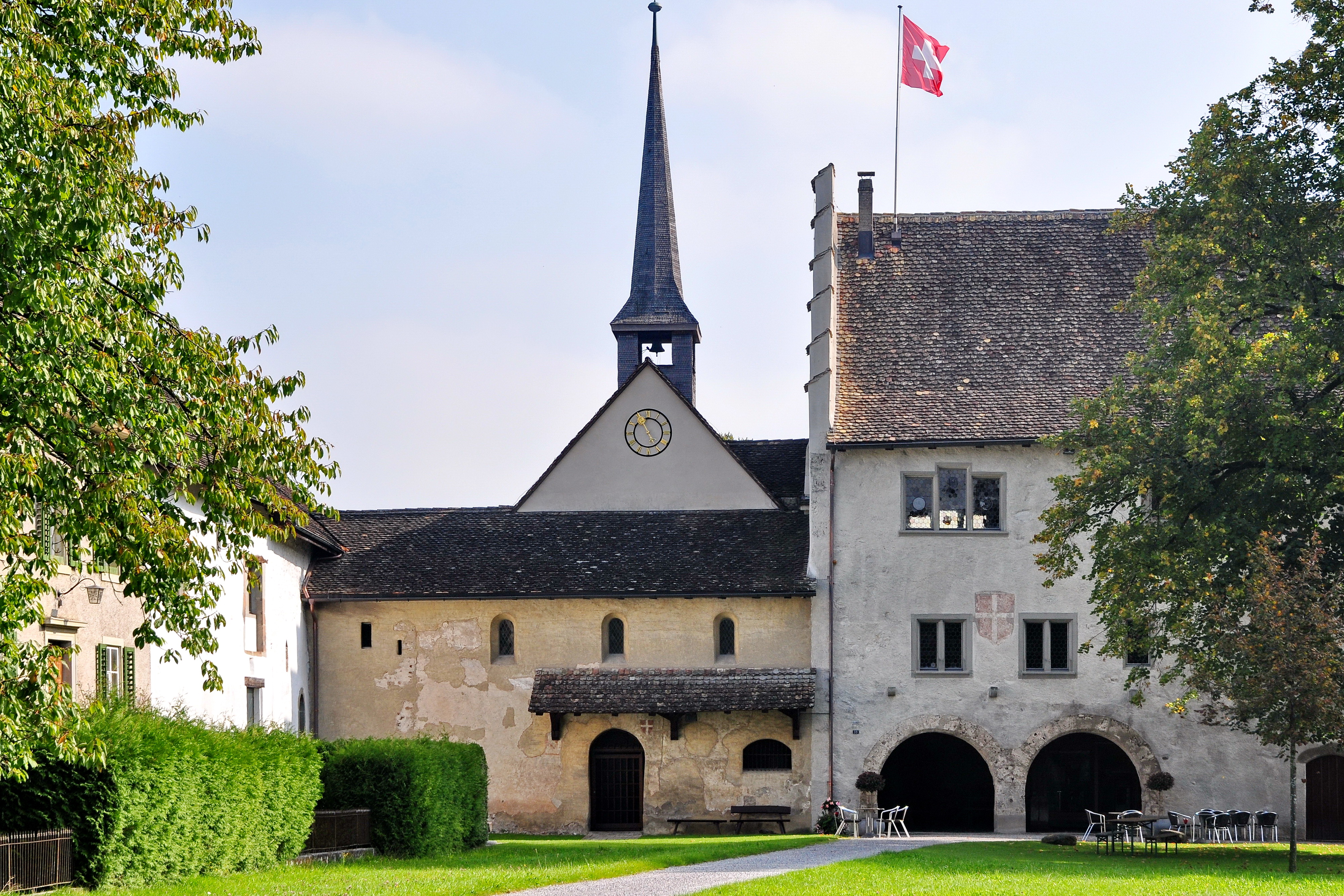
chapel and adjacent main building

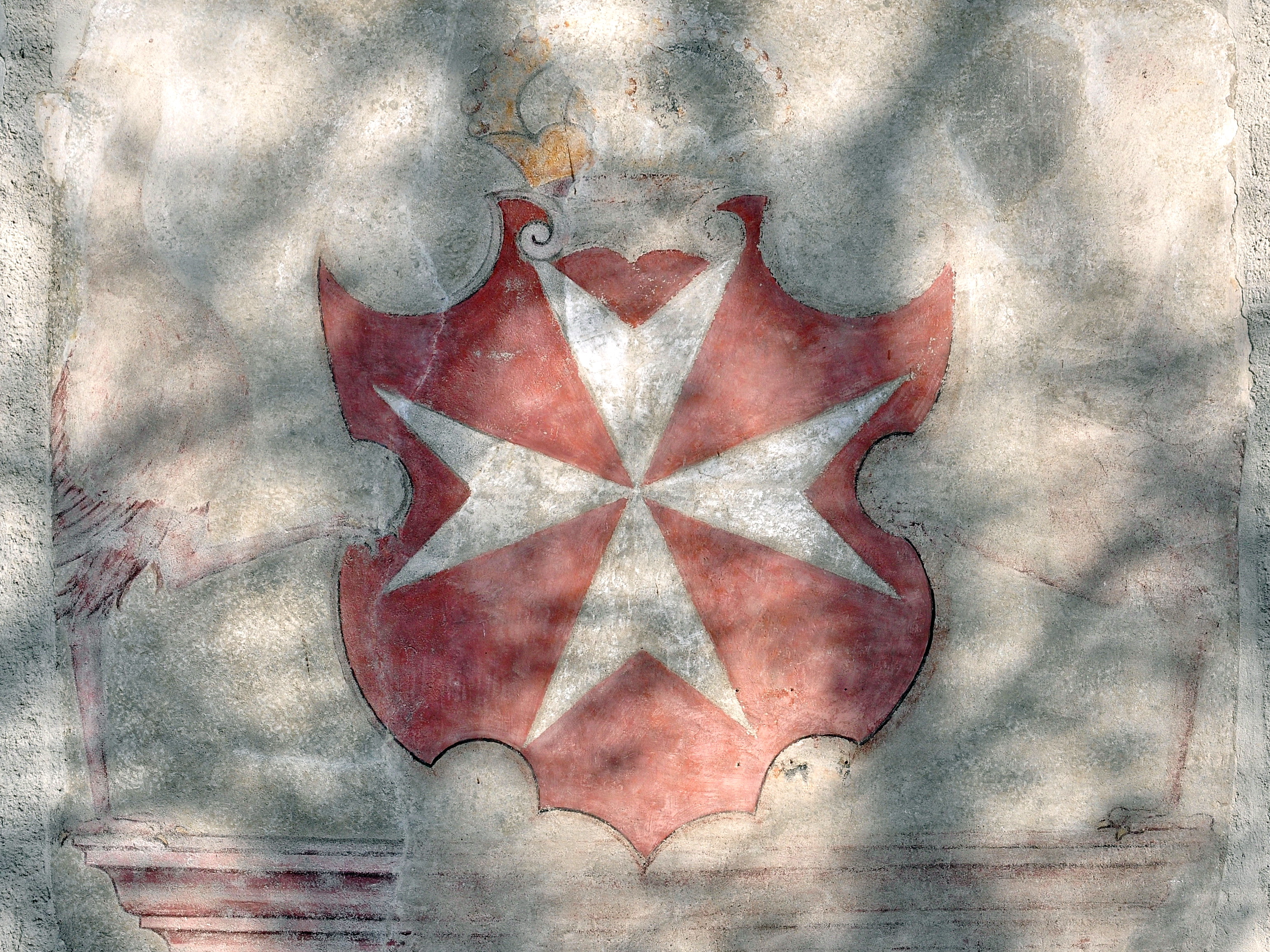
coats of arms of the order

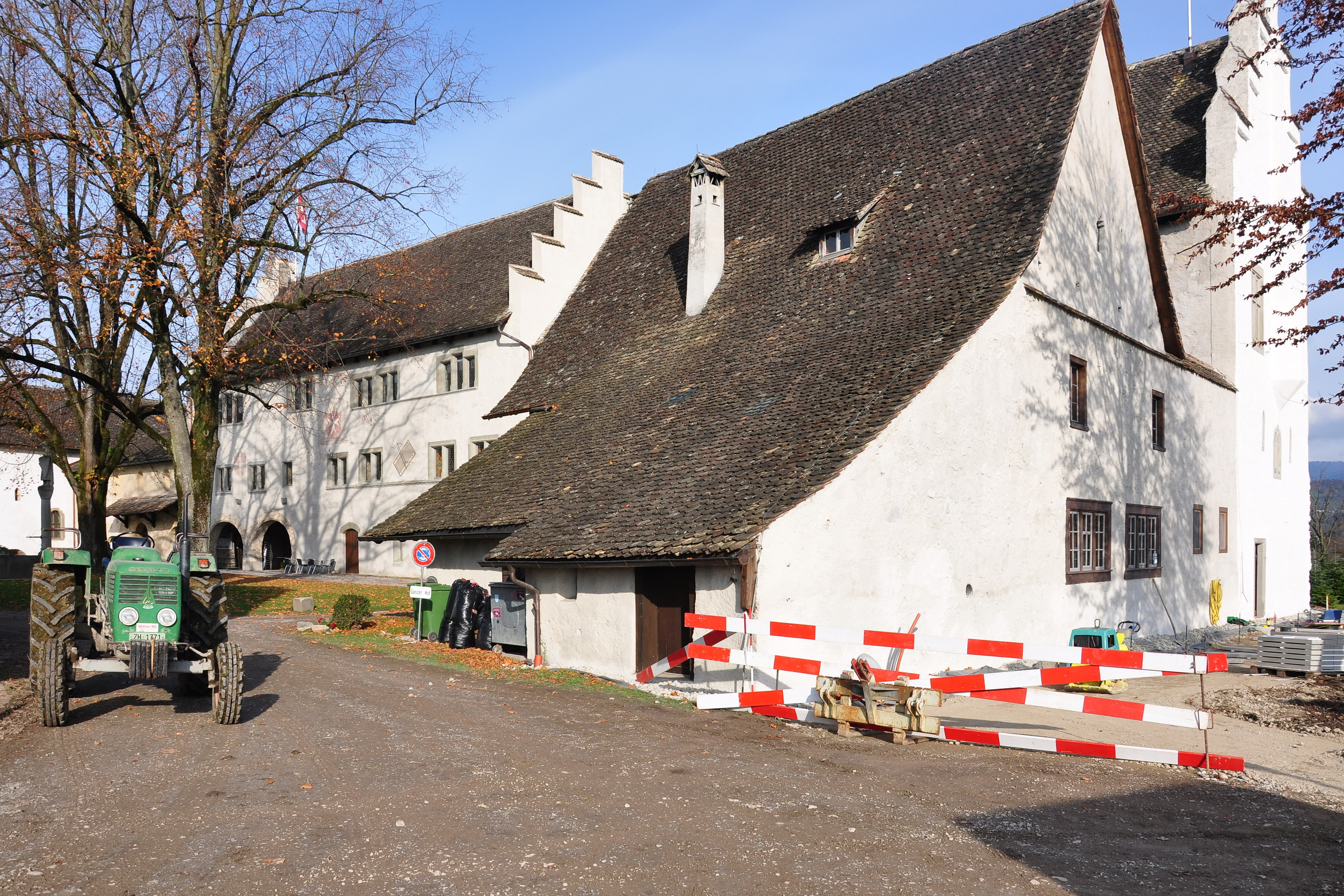
Gesindehaus

The commander's building houses the Ritterhaus history museum that was established in the 1940s. Its Hotz coin collection shows an assortment of more than 400 coins that give record of the Order and its Grandmasters from 14th to 18th century. The museum also comprises the collection of antique arms of Johann Jakob Vogel (1813–1862) who donated about 220 arms to the Ritterhaus Bubikon. In 2011 the so-called Epochen-Kräutergarten ("epochal herb garden") opened to the public presenting medieval herbs from the ancient world on about 400 square metres (4,306 ft^{2}).

== Protection ==
Since 1959 the site has been under protection of the federal state. Ritterhaus Bubikon is listed in the Swiss inventory of cultural property of national and regional significance as a Class A object of national importance.

== Literature ==
- Roger Sablonier: Gründungszeit ohne Eidgenossen: Politik und Gesellschaft in der Innerschweiz um 1300. hier + jetzt, Baden 2008, ISBN 978-3-03919-085-0.
- Markus Brühlmann / Michael Tomaschett: Johanniterkommende Bubikon «Kreuz und Quer». Ritterhausgesellschaft. Bubikon 2000. ISBN 3-9522014-0-5.
- Erwin Eugster: Adlige Territorialpolitik in der Ostschweiz. Kirchliche Stiftungen im Spannungsfeld früher landesherrlicher Verdrängungspolitik. Zürich 1991, ISBN 3-90527-868-5.

== See also ==
- Reformation in Zürich
- Rüti Abbey
