= Greifensee Castle =

Castle in Zurich, Switzerland

Coordinates: 47°21′54″N 8°40′32″E

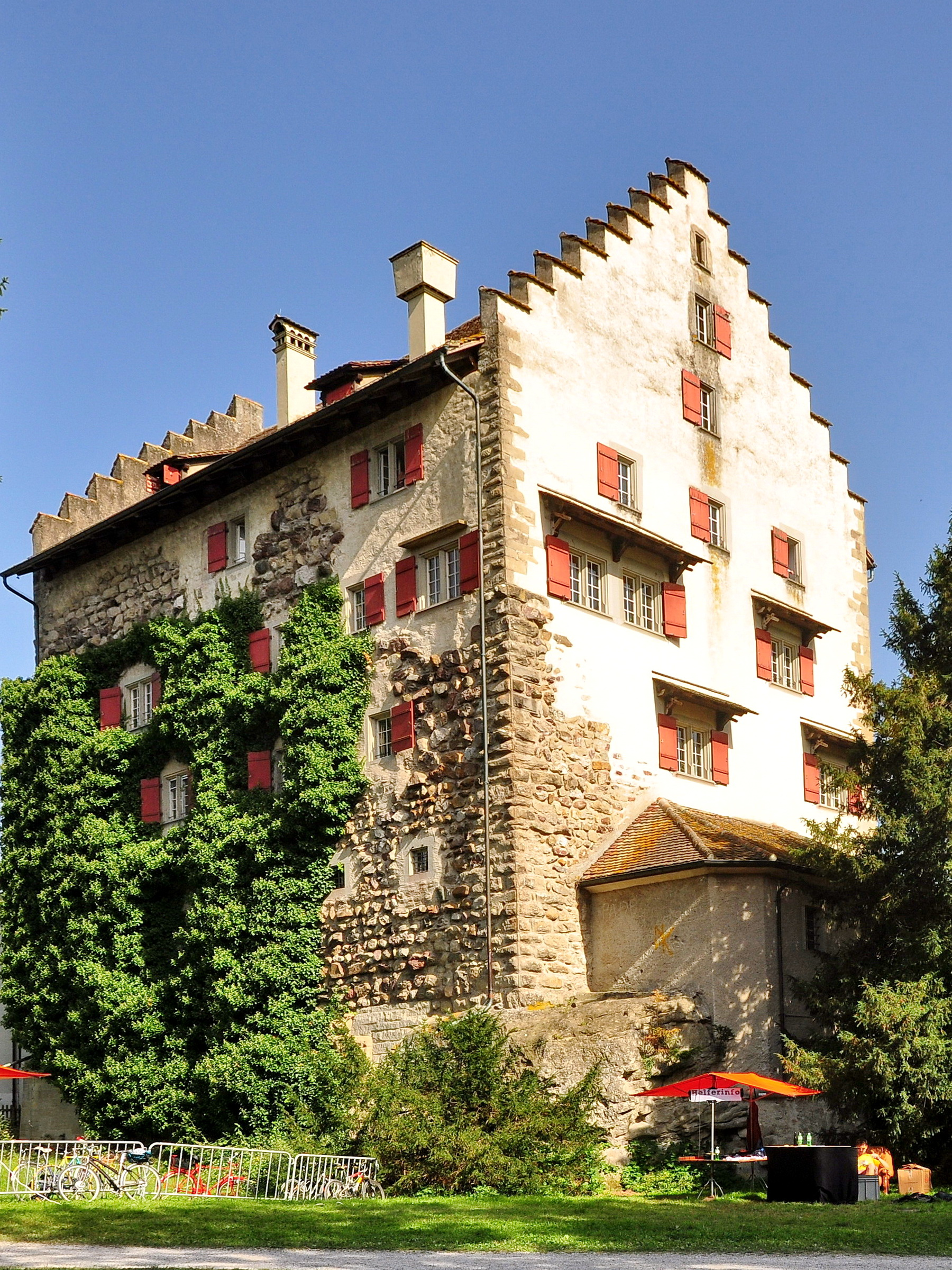
Greifensee Castle

Greifensee Castle (German: Schloss Greifensee) is a castle in the municipality of Greifensee and the canton of Zurich in Switzerland. It was probably built by the House of Rapperswil and is a Swiss heritage site of national significance.

== See also ==
- List of castles in Switzerland
