= House of Rapperswil =

Swiss noble family

Lordship (County) of Rapperswil Herrschaft (Grafschaft) Rapperswil
- 1220–1464
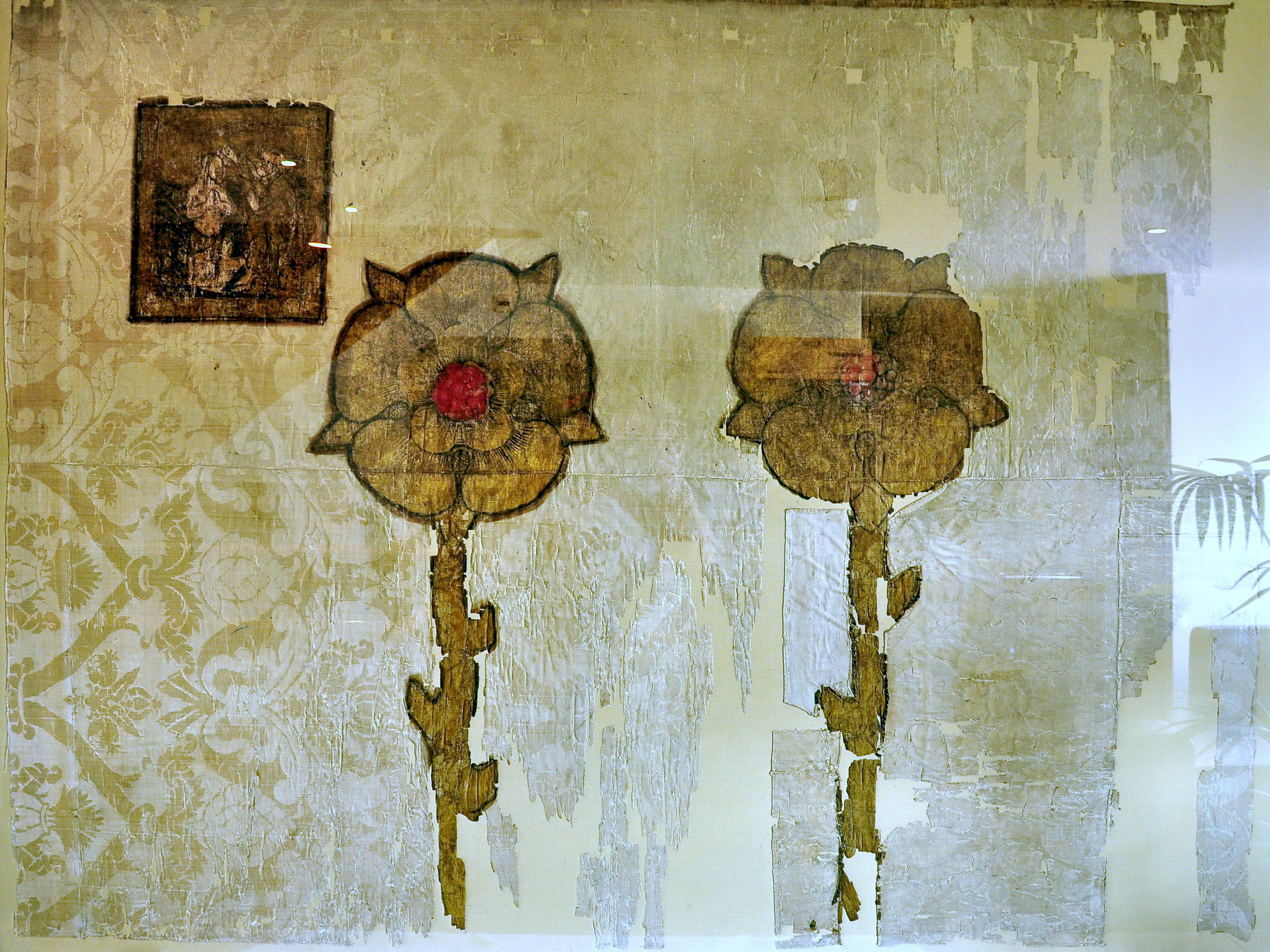
- Juliusbanner (1512) Coat of arms
- Status: Lordship, County
- Capital: Rapperswil
- Government: Lordship, County
- Historical era: Middle Ages, Early Modern period
  - Rapperswil founded: 1229 (official date)
  - Lordship established: ca 1233 1220
  - Inherited by counts of Habsburg-Laufenburg: → 1309–58
  - Purchased liberty from Austria: 1415–58
  - Allied with Habsburg and Zürich in the Old Zürich War: 1440–46
  - Protectorate of the Old Swiss Confederacy: → 1458–1798
  - Annexed to Helvetic canton of Linth: → 1798 1464
  - Joined St Gallen: → February 19, 1803
Preceded by	Succeeded by
Duchy of Swabia	Old Swiss Confederacy

The House of Rapperswil respectively Counts of Rapperswil (Grafen von Rapperwil since 1233, before Lords) ruled the upper Zürichsee and Seedamm region around Rapperswil and parts of, as of today, Swiss cantons of St. Gallen, Glarus, Zürich and Graubünden when their influence was most extensive around the 1200s until the 1290s. They acted also as Vogt of the most influential Einsiedeln Abbey in the 12th and 13th century, and at least three abbots of Einsiedeln were members of Rapperswil family.

== History ==
=== Early history ===
In 697 legends mentions a knight called Raprecht in connection with the later Grynau Castle. The former seat of the Vogt in Altendorf was first mentioned as "Rahprehteswilare" in a document of emperor Otto II, in which goods of the Einsiedeln abbey were confirmed on 14 August 972.

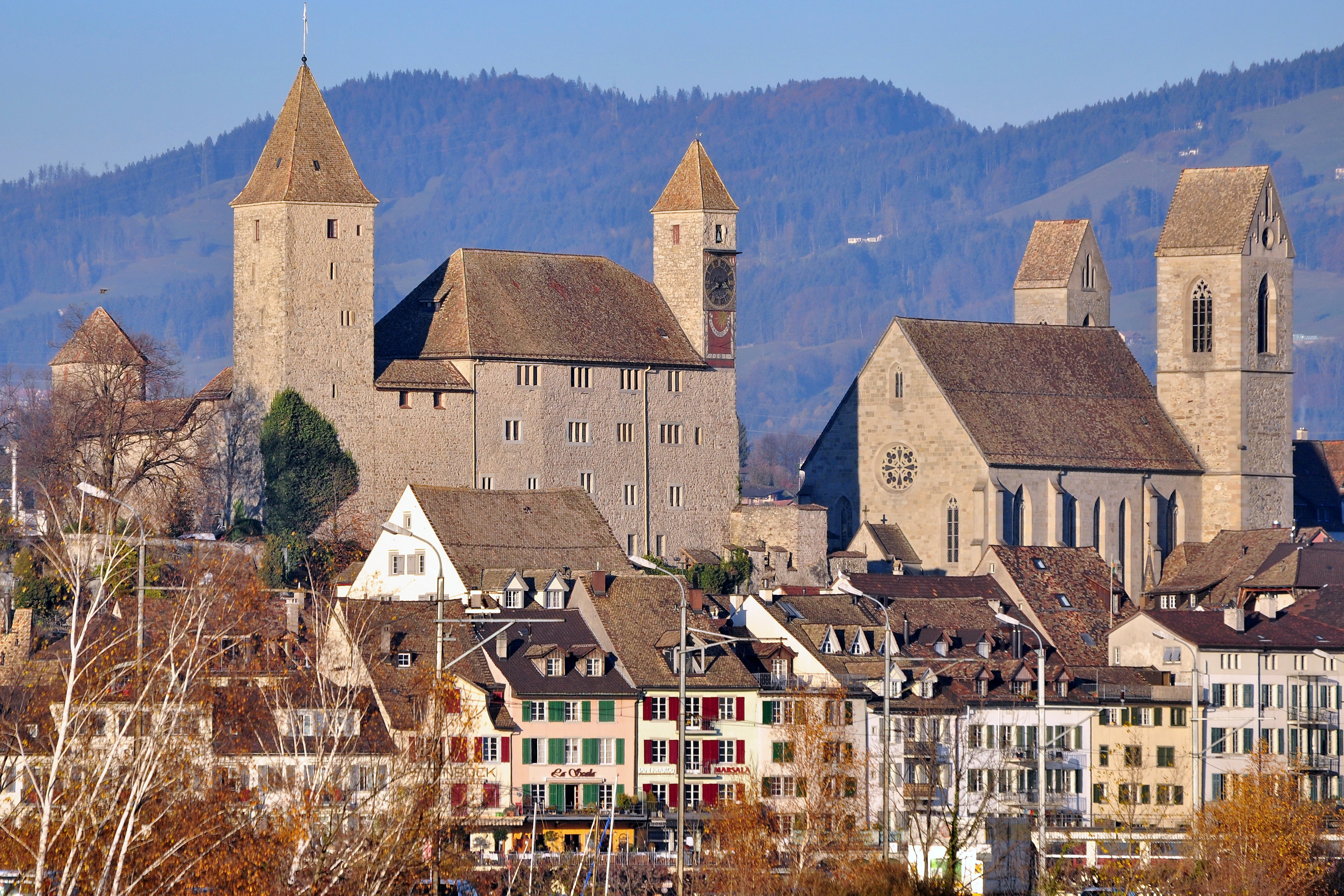
Rapperswil Castle and the neighbouring parish church

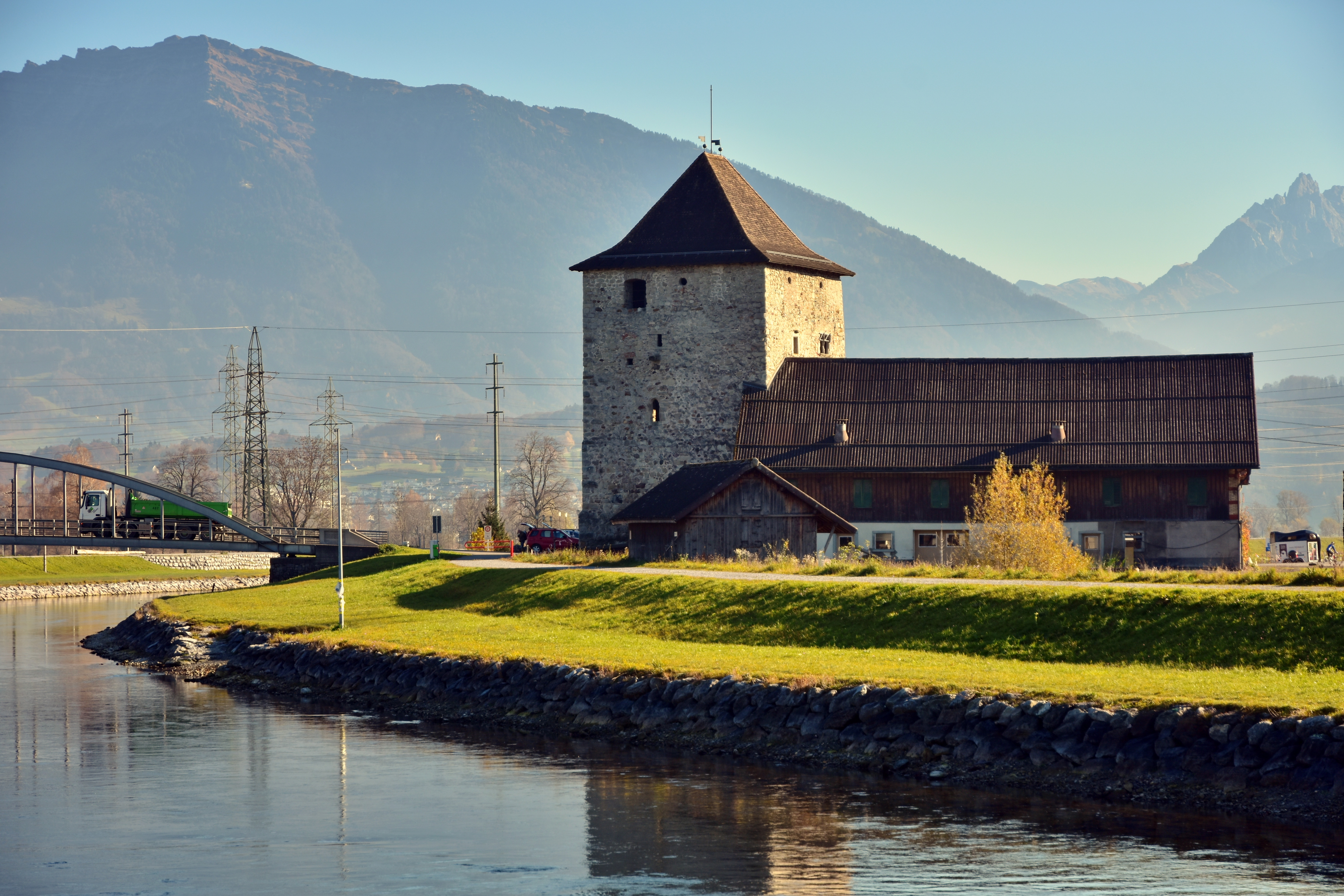
Grynau Tower

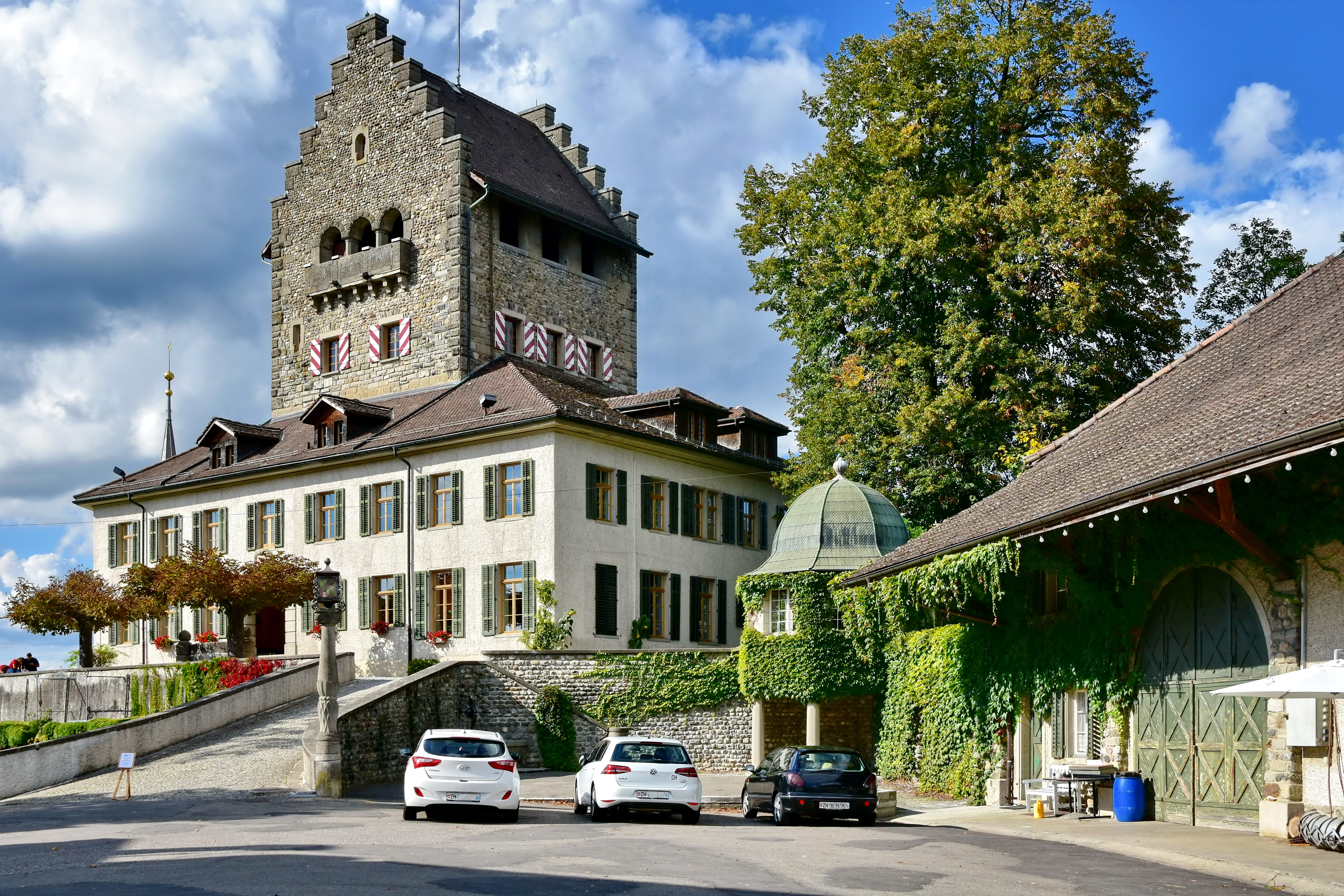
Uster Castle

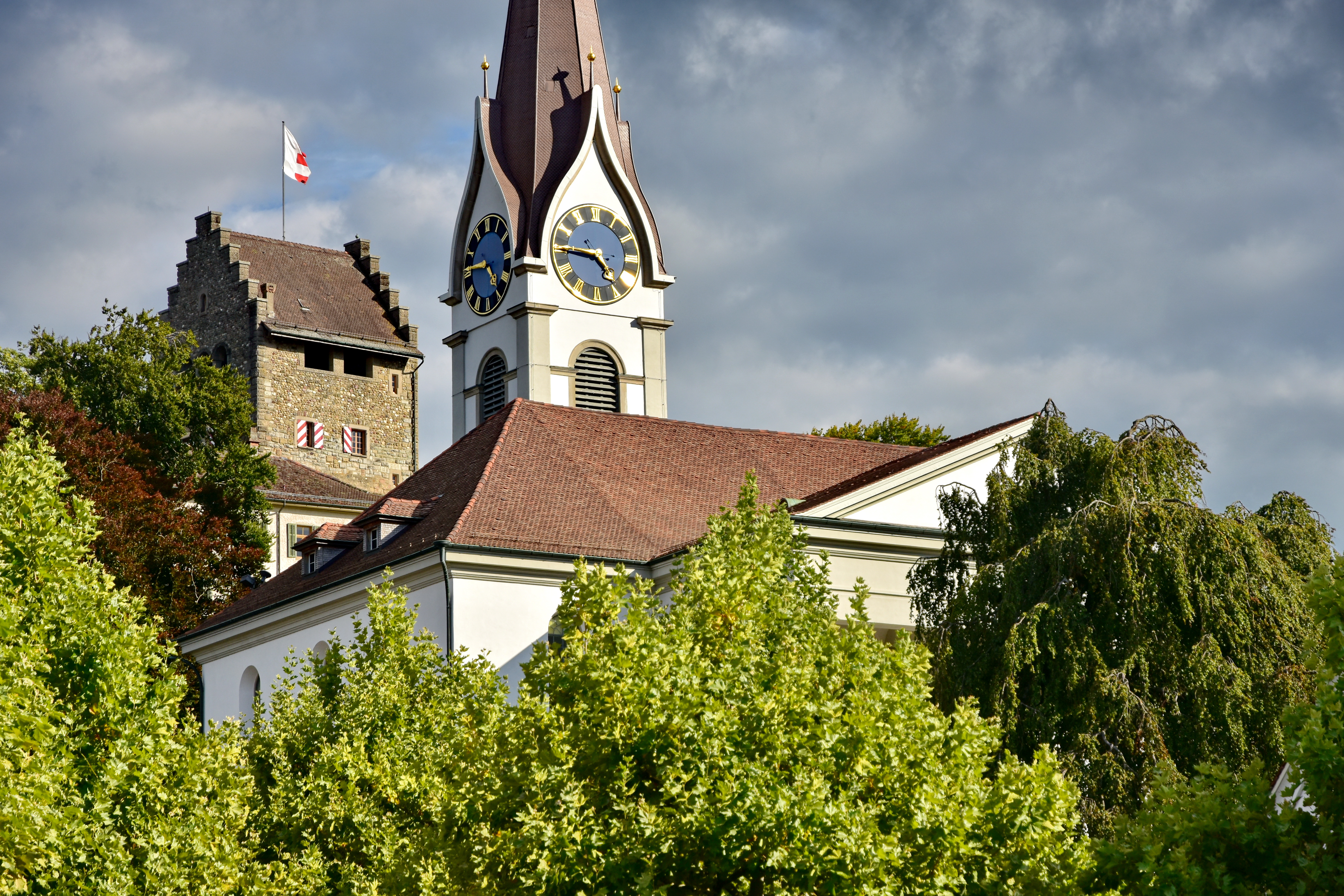
Uster castle and St. Andreas Church, first mentioned in 1099

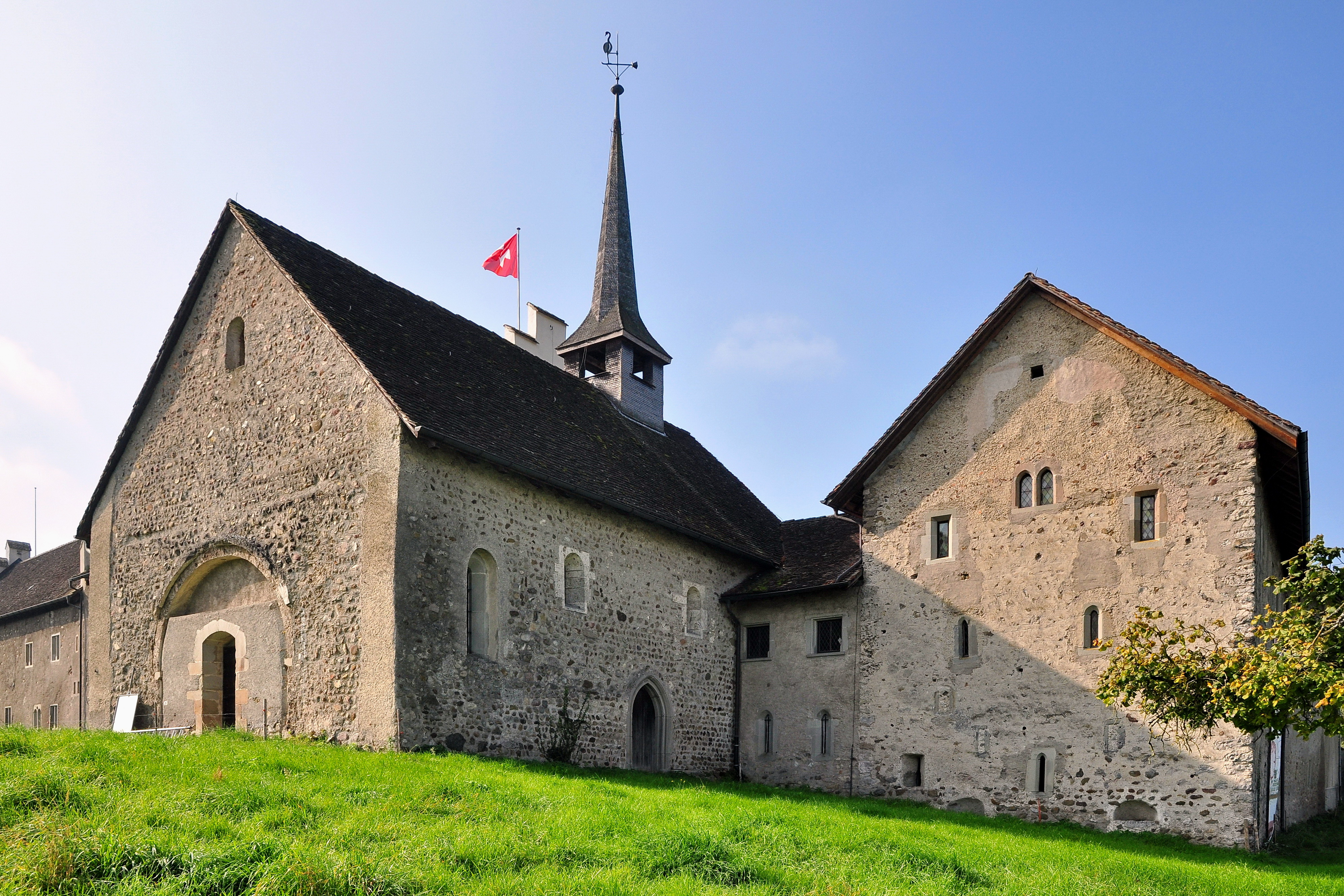
Ritterhaus Bubikon

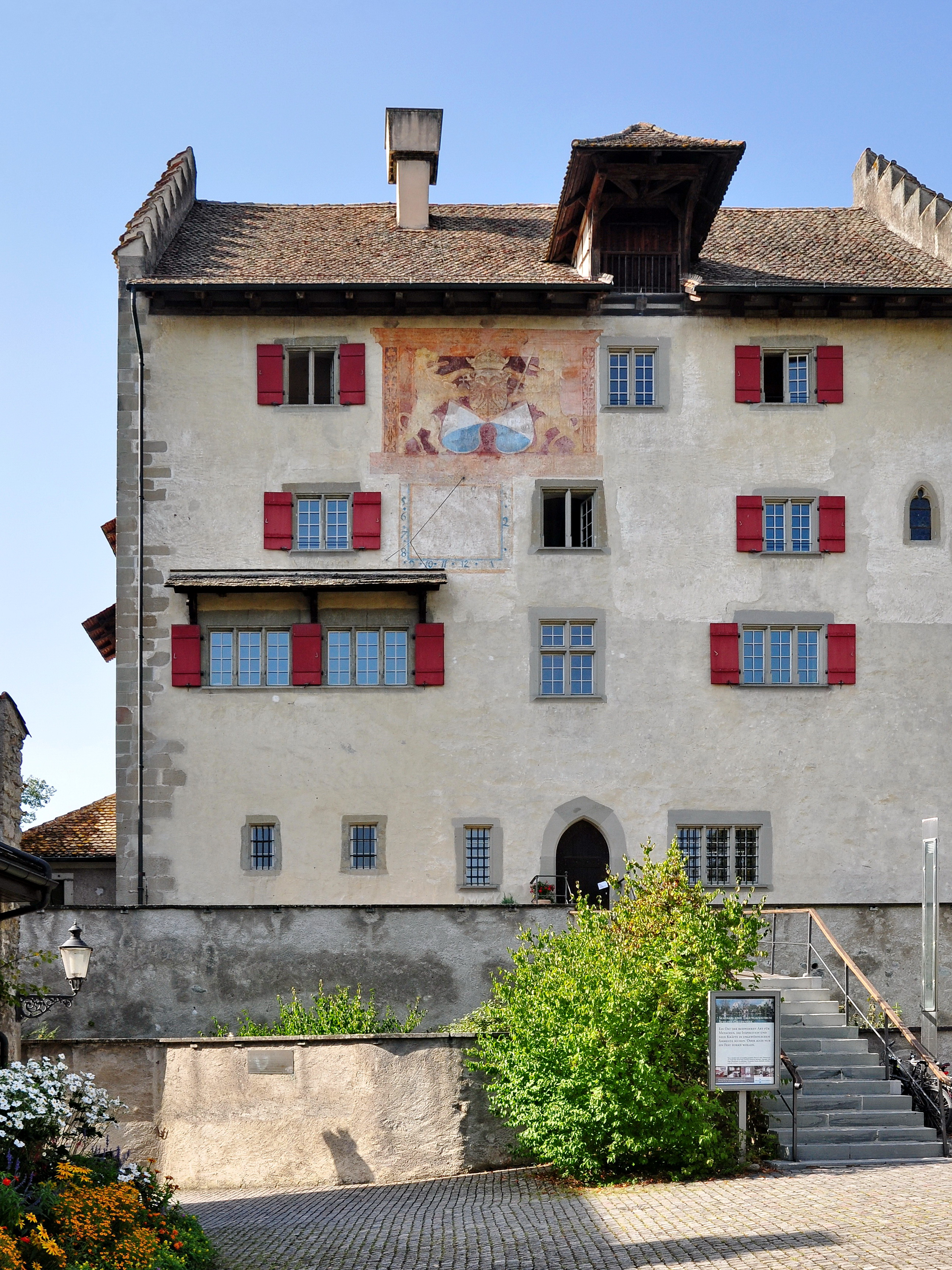
Greifensee Castle

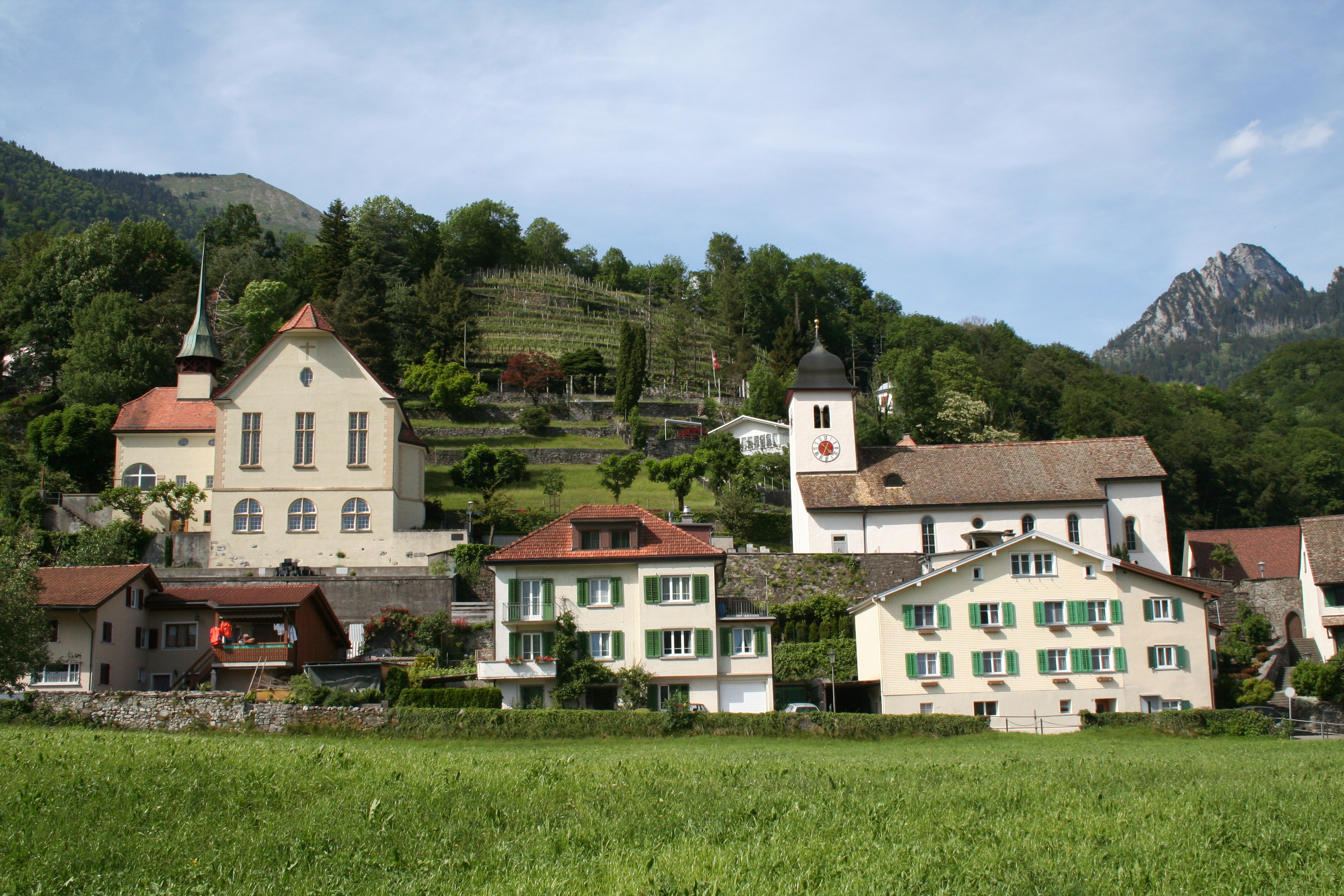
Weesen Nunnery

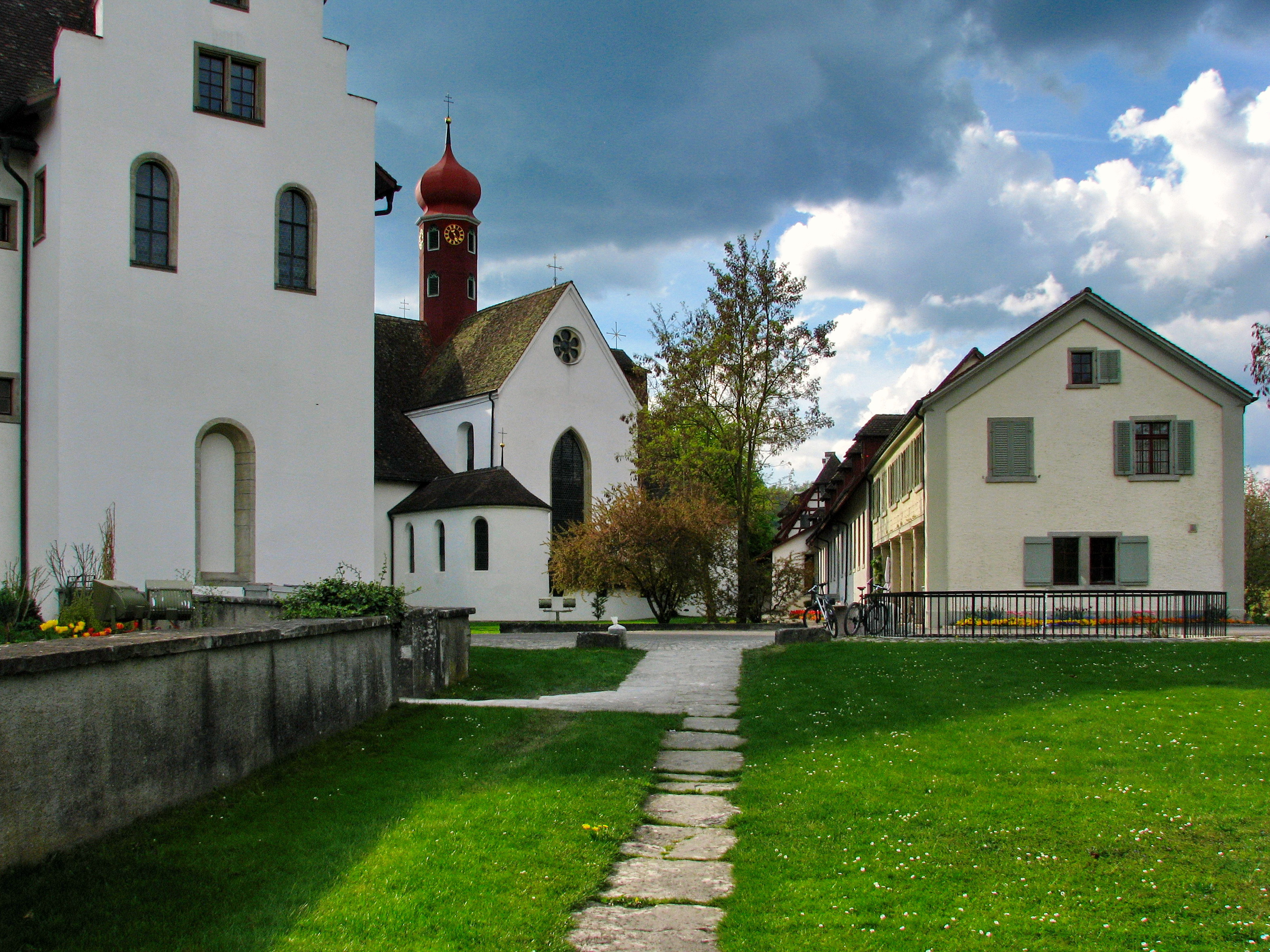
Wettingen Abbey

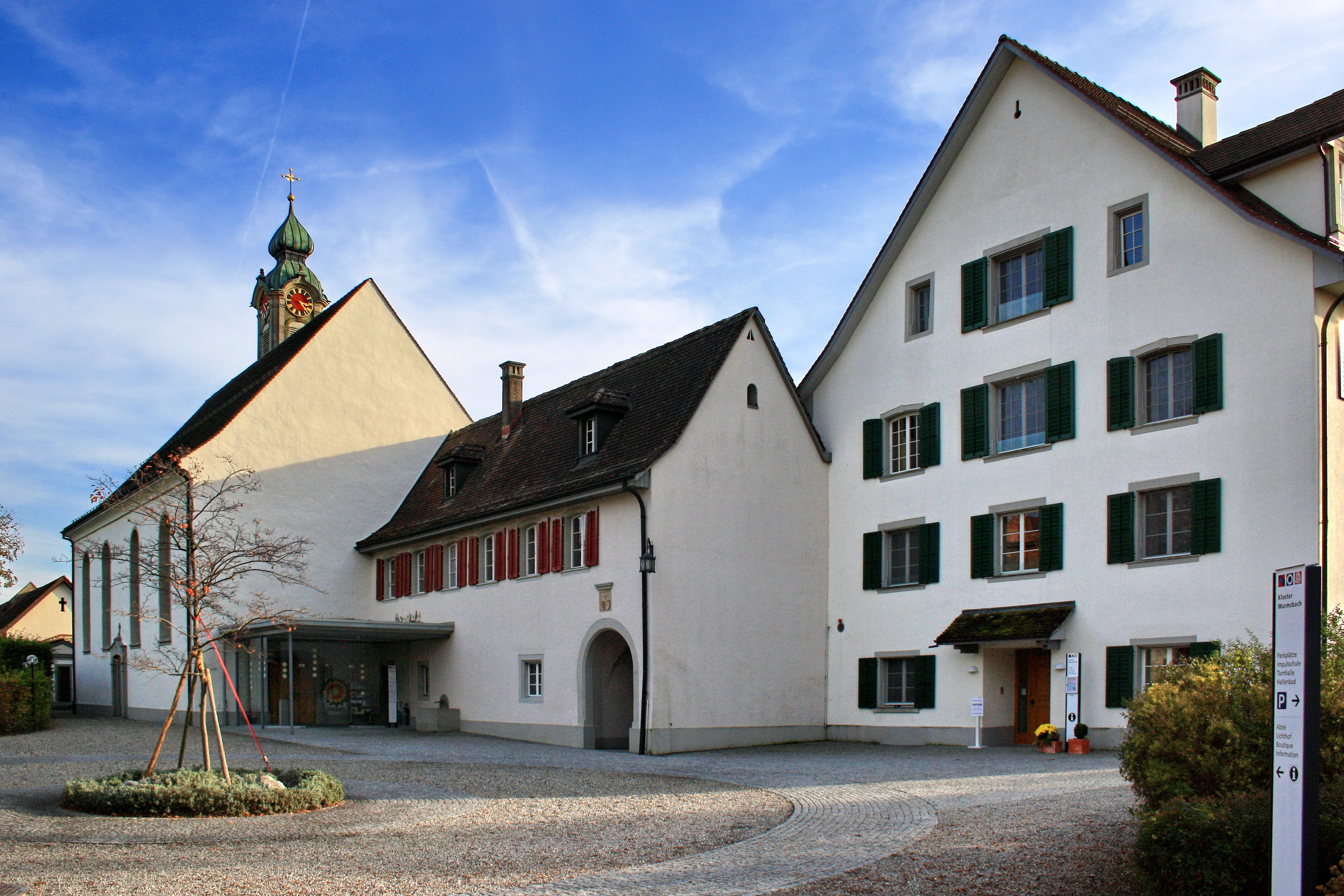
Wurmsbach Abbey

The fourth Abbot of Einsiedeln, Wirunt (996–1026), or Wirendus, Wirund, Wem, Wirand, Verendus, was according to 15th-century chronists a Graf von Wandelburg of the Rapperswil family. Wandelburg may be another name of the Grynau Castle at the Buechberg hill on Obersee lake shore. According to the abbey's archives there are no reliable sources about Wirunt's origin. Other unreliable sources mention that Rudolf I (1090–1101) the 9th abbot was a member of the Rapperswil family. Ulrich I von Rapperswil (1192–1206) became the 14th abbot of Einsiedeln.

In 1099 first mentioned, the donation of the St. Andreas Church was given by the House of Rapperswil as a spacious three-naved country church. The assumably legal connection with the church situated above the Uster Castle, due to the archaeological investigations of 1982 so far is not proven, but the pastoral rights were sold by Elisabeth von Rapperswil not earlier than 1300. Some fortifications, among them in Greifensee, Uster and Alt-Rapperswil were built probably in the early 12th century by members of the family. The Vogts of Rapperswil were persons of influence in the so-called Marchenstreit between the people of Schwyz and the Einsiedeln abbey beginning around 1100. Around 1180 the lords of Rapperswil inherit the parish rights of Weisslingen and free float in Russikon, Erisberg, Luckhausen, Moosburg and in Kempthal, as well as the castles Greifenberg and Bernegg, and the bailiwick of Kempten in the area around the Töss Valley respectively in Eastern Switzerland.

Assumably in compensation of claims related to the Alt-Rapperswil lands and rights, a change of goods occurred to establish the Bubikon Commandry, given by the Counts of Toggenburg and by the Counts of Rapperswil between 1191 and 1198. Although in concurrency to the neighbouring Rüti Abbey that was founded in 1206, the commandery's lands and goods grew with donations by local noble families during the 13th and 14th centuries.

=== Counts of Rapperswil ===
The house (lords) of Rapperswil was first mentioned before 1192 in a large numbers of documents, for the last time around 1206 related to the abbot Rudolf of (Alt)-Rapperswil, and since 1233 as Grafen (counts) of Rapprechtswilare. As between 1192 and 1220 documentary mentions of the family are widely missing, the modern research assumes that the original lineage is extinct and subsequently a dispute over inheritance may be broken. Therefore, the historians use the term Alt-Rapperswil (old line) and Neu-Rapperswil (new line). Likewise, it is assumed that there were strong family ties with the houses of Regensberg, Kyburg and Toggenburg (see Members of the family), that may have been involved in the dispute over the inheritance.

Nevertheless, around 1200 the Rapperswil Castle and the fortifications of the former locus Endingen (given by the Einsiedeln abbey) were built by Rudolf II and his son Rudolf III of Rapperswil. Officially in 1229, the town of Rapperswil was founded when the nobility of Rapperswil moved from Altendorf across the lake to Rapperswil, and a wave of foundations is documented: Wettingen Abbey in 1227, and the Mariazell-Wurmsbach Abbey in 1259. On 28 August 1232 a document confirms an exchange of goods between members of the noble families of Kyburg and Rapperswil in the villages of Oberwesin and Niderwesin that were in the possession of Kyburg to 1264 respectively of Rapperswil to 1283, the nucleus of the monastic community "in den Wyden", a community of lay women or beguines which was Count Rudolf IV von Rapperswil donated certain duties, and lands "in den Widen" to establish the Dominikanerinnenkloster Maria Zuflucht in 1259. Initially, the community was supported by Predigerkloster Zürich because its close relationship to the House of Rapperswil.

On the peninsula at Oberbollingen, the St. Nicholas Chapel is mentioned, where around 1229 a small Cistercian (first associated with the Rüti Abbey) monastery was established; in 1267 it was united with the nearby Mariazell-Wurmsbach nunnery. St. Martin Busskirch is one of the oldest churches around the Lake Zürich and was until 1229 the parish church of the family. There even the citizens of Rapperswil had to attend services, until Count Rudolf II of Rapperswil built the Stadtpfarrkirche on Herrenberg next to the Rapperswil castle on the Lindenhof hill.

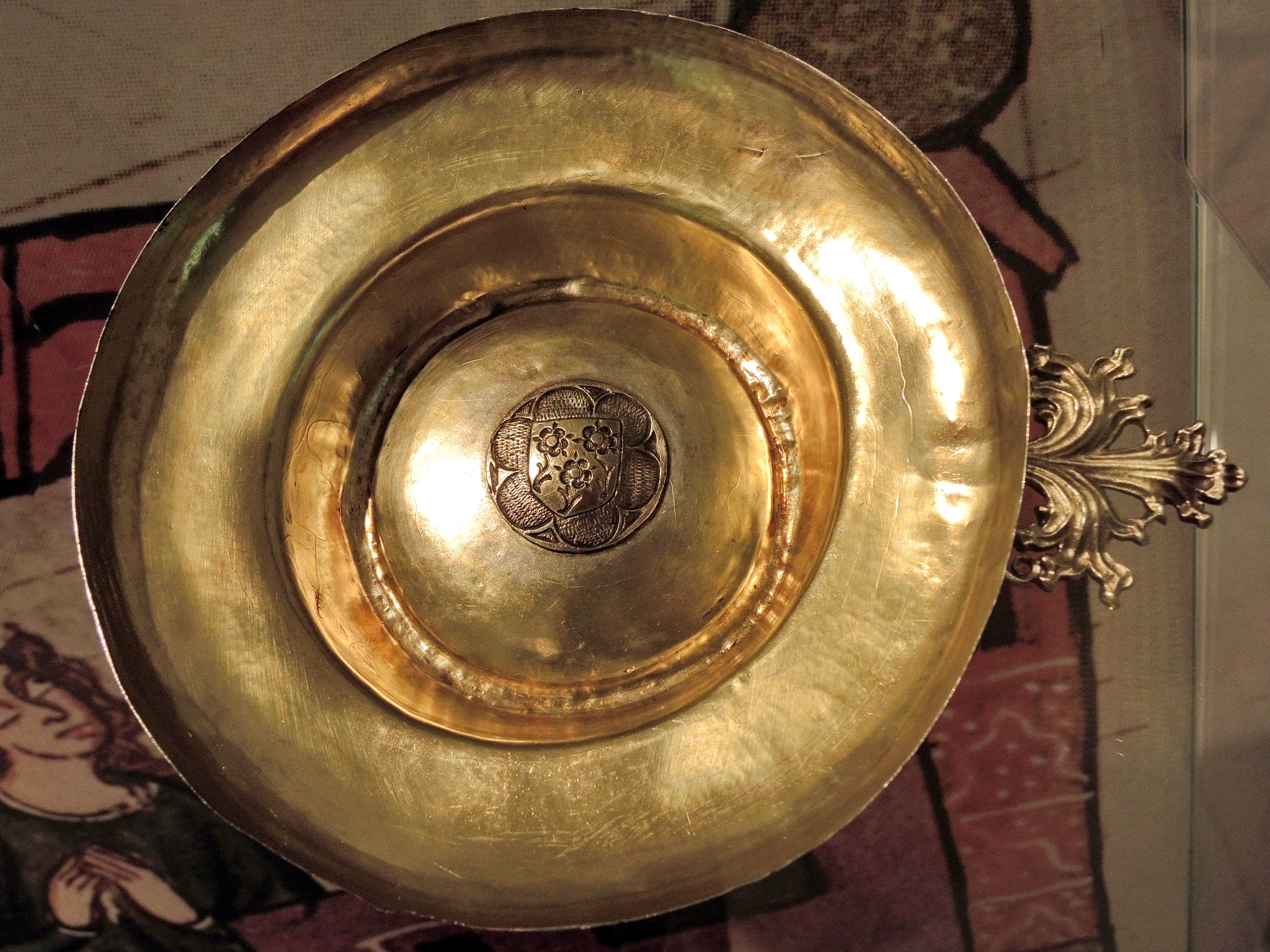
Alleged drinking saddle of Countess Elisabeth von Rapperswil

At that time, the House of Rapperswil had possessions in what is now Eastern and Central Switzerland. They bore the title of count from 1233, as a partisan of the Staufer kings. Besides also the Urseren valley in 1240, and since the 13th centuries, Lützelau island has belonged to the family, later to the community of Rapperswil (now called Ortsbürgergemeinde); its sandstone was used to build the Rapperswil castle, the parish church and the town walls. The house of Rapperswil became extinct again in 1283, with the death of the 18-year-old Count Rudolf V, after which emperor Rudolf I acquired their fiefs, and the family had to sold large parts of the former bailiwick. Great parts of the remaining property of the Herrschaft Rapperswil passed to the house of Homberg, represented by Count Ludwig († April 27, 1289) by first marriage of Elisabeth von Rapperswil and their son, Wernher von Homberg. Around 1309 the remaining bailiwick's rights passed to Count Rudolf († 1315) of Habsburg-Laufenburg by second marriage of Elisabeth of Rapperswil, the sister of Rudolf V, followed by her son, Count Johann I († 1337) and his son, Johann II († 1380).

=== Rapperswil-Habsburg-Laufenburg ===
==== Feud between the former city councils of Zürich and Brun's regime from 1336 to 1350 ====
On 12 July 1336 Rudolf Brun, mayor of the city of Zürich, defeated his political opponents, the former members of the Rat (council) of Zürich, of which around 12 members found refuge by count Johann I in Rapperswil. The feud (German: Fehde) of the so-called Äusseres Zürich coalition was supported by the Rapperswil bailiwick, some knights and noble families, and Count Johann became the leader of the opposition in the city of Zürich. Latter was supported among others by the House of Toggenburg as its military arm, as well as by the Einsiedeln Abbey which supported Brun's regime. The counselors hoped for support by Count Johann and offered probably in return the forgiveness of debt of Rapperswil, as some sources hypothesize. Some, if not most of the refugees, were decades before their exile vassals of the Counts of Rapperswil, including the ancient councilors family Bilgeri those members lost six of their seats in the council of Zürich. Johann I was killed in 1337 in the course of a battle at the Grynau Castle against Zürich-Toggenburg troops.

Count Johann's children – Johann II, the oldest of three sons, Rudolf and Gotfrid (and their sister Agnes) – were set under guardianship of Albrecht, Duke of Austria, sealed by a document between the city of Zürich and the German King respectively Duke Albrecht on 21 November 1337. The document included also a peace contract and regulations, but as well as the documents in the following years − between the city of Zürich and Austria – It included among others: Johann's children got the documents related to their rights in Raprechtswile and their possessions in the March (Alt-Rapperswil) area. Furthermore, the document also included the Zürich councils (äussere Bürger) who refuged to Rapperswil and financial compensations by the former councils to Brun's entourage, they remained banned until 1342, and the äussere former councils had to pledge allegiance to the King and to the citizenry of Zürich. In compensation, the goods and lands of the äussere former councils had to be refund by the innere (meaning the Guild councils), as long as their property was not sold (by Brun's entourage). These restrictions also included Johann I's children – the German king had to vouch for Brun's regime, Duke Albrecht for Rapperswil and the underage Rapperswils Counts. The feud was continued Johann II in the late 1340s, but there also were a short time alliance with the city of Zürich: On 28 September 1343 Count Johann II and his brothers Rudolf and Gotfried von Habsburg and the citizens of Rapperswil signed a document for an eternal confederacy with the city council and the citizens of Zürich. An attempted coup by the aristocratic opposition, known as äusseres Zürich, in Zürich was forcefully put down on 23/24 February 1350: Count Johann II, now the opposition's leader, was arrested for two years, and the town walls of Rapperswil, its castle and Altendorf castle were destroyed by Brun in 1350.

==== Peace agreement and exchange of goods to Habsburg-Austria ====
The peace agreement on 1 September 1352 between Count Albrecht von Oesterreich and the city of Zürich was adjusted by two furthers documents. The first one was the agreement between the Counts Hans (Johann II), Rudolf and Gotfrid, and the city of Zürich; it was sealed on 19 September 1352, and the brothers had to confirm among others that they will also condone their relatives who supported the city of Zürich. The second document included that Johann's II imprisonment in Zürich shall be forgotten, all prisoners shall be released, and even Count Albrecht would support the city of Zürich against the counts Johans, Rudolf und Gotfrid von Habsburg so needed, sealed by Markgraf Ludwig von Brandenburg on 23 September 1352. Another document was related to the costs of the captivity of Rapperswil citizens in Zürich which was sealed on 20 May 1358 by relatives of the new lord Count Rudolf von Österreich in Rapreswile, namely Ott von Missouw, Fridrich von Waslze, Heinrich der Raspe, Heinrich der Brunner, Wolfgang von Winden, Johanse von Platzhein and Vogt Johans von Langenhart.

==== Division of the estate between Count Johann I's children ====
The division of an estate between the Counts Rudolf, Gotfrid and Johan von Habsburg was regulated in a document on 1 July 1354:

1. Johan received the town of Rapperswil with all accessories and what is on this side of Zürichsee (Lake Zürich); 110 pound annual interest on the tax from Glarus, who have pledged for 400 silver marks to the Dukes of Austria; the right to initiate all pledged assets at the right bank of the lake and the castle Greifenberg and the valley of Fischental.
2. Rudolf received the city and castle of Laufenburg with all accessories; all pledged goods "inwendig und zwüschent or zuwendig" (literally: within and between or towards) the Aare river and the Aare gorge; the Sisgau county; an estate in Reinach which is pledged to Ulrich Tutman von Aarau; the mortgaged castle Herznach, and if Rudolf should trigger this pledge he has to pay to his sister Agnes, a nun in the Säckingen Abbey, an annuity of 14 marks of silver annually. He is committed to adhere debt of the three brothers by his personal property liability for the amount of 4300 Gulden.
3. Gotfrid received Alt-Rapperswil with all accessories, the March and the Wägital area; the pledged property on the left bank of Zürichsee; the city of Rheinau and the Klettgau county with all accessories.
4. Shared ownership of the three brothers were their feud; the Homberg castle and a good at Blanckenburg.
5. Johan, Rudolf and Gotfrid confirmed that the division took place by mutual consent. In support, they ask her uncle Count Imer von Strassberg, the baron Hug von Gutenberg and knight Cuonrat Berensess who were present at the division to seal the document. Sealed by the three brothers and the three witnesses on 1 July 1354.

The remains of the former Herrschaft Rapperswil – Rapperswil and some surrounding villages excluding Jona – were sold by Count Johann II and his brothers, Rudolf (IV) and Gottfried (II), to the Habsburg family and partially (Höfe) to the city of Zürich, as the house of Rapperswil was not able to rebuild the town and the destroyed castles – the rights passed over to Albrecht II, Duke of Habsburg-Austria. All rights related to lands in the Höfe district including the settlements at Bäch, Pfäffikon and Wollerau were sold by Count Goetfrid von Habsburg-Rapperswil on 19 May 1358.

== Extinction ==
Although Countess Elisabeth von Rapperswil was able to continue the line and secured the Habsburg-Laufenburg line the extensive possessions of Rapperswil in Zürichgau. But the Homberg-Rapperswil line extinct with the death of Wernher von Homberg, and the Habsburg-Laufenburg line in 1408, when Johann IV von Habsburg-Laufenburg died without male heirs.

== Counts of Rapperswil ==
=== House of Rapperswil ===
Ruler	Born	Reign	Ruling part	Consort	Death	Notes
Ulrich I	c.1036 ?	1048 – 1098	County of Rapperswil	Unknown	c.1098 aged 61–62	According to Heinrich Murer, they were the first counts of Rapperswil. They were also Counts of Wandelberg.
Rudolph I	c.1059 Son of Ulrich I	1098 – c.1110	County of Rapperswil	Unknown	c.1110 aged 50–51	According to Heinrich Murer, they were the first counts of Rapperswil. They were also Counts of Wandelberg.
Ulrich II	c.1084 Son of Rudolph I	c.1110 – 1145?	County of Rapperswil	Unknown at least three children	c.1129/45? aged 44–45 or 60-61	He was cited Schirmvogt in Ensiedeln in 1114.
Rudolph II	c.1110 First son of Ulrich II	c.1145 – 1171	County of Rapperswil	Unknown at least three children	c.1171 aged 60–61	Children of Ulrich II, possibly ruled jointly. Rudolf II was also Kastvogt in Ensiedeln.He was possibly co-founder of the Bubikon Commandry. Ulrich III is made here a possible ruler because he was counted in Heinrich Murer's family tree, and was cited in 1155, being dead possibly not long after. The same goes for their brother Gebezo: he was cited in 1153, and may have also died shortly after this mention.
Ulrich III	c.1110 Second son of Ulrich II	c.1145 – 1155	County of Rapperswil	Unmarried	c.1155 aged 44–45	Children of Ulrich II, possibly ruled jointly. Rudolf II was also Kastvogt in Ensiedeln.He was possibly co-founder of the Bubikon Commandry. Ulrich III is made here a possible ruler because he was counted in Heinrich Murer's family tree, and was cited in 1155, being dead possibly not long after. The same goes for their brother Gebezo: he was cited in 1153, and may have also died shortly after this mention.
Gebezo	c.1110 Third son of Ulrich II	c.1145 – 1153	County of Rapperswil	Unmarried	c.1153 aged 42–43	Children of Ulrich II, possibly ruled jointly. Rudolf II was also Kastvogt in Ensiedeln.He was possibly co-founder of the Bubikon Commandry. Ulrich III is made here a possible ruler because he was counted in Heinrich Murer's family tree, and was cited in 1155, being dead possibly not long after. The same goes for their brother Gebezo: he was cited in 1153, and may have also died shortly after this mention.
Rudolph III	c.1160 Son of Rudolph II	c.1171 – 1218	County of Rapperswil	Unknown at least two children	1218 aged 56–58	Moved the home of the house Alt-Rapperswil from Altendorf (SZ) to Rapperswil (SG), founded the city of Rapperswil at the former Endingen village. Probably participated in an important donation to Ritterhaus Bubikon c.1192, together with the Counts of Toggenburg, as he is represented there in a fresco with his family. Had at least two sisters: Adelaide, who married Walter III, Baron of Vaz, and Guta, married to Diethelm I, Count of Toggenburg.
Vacancy in the county: 1218-1232
Rudolph IV	c.1185 Son of Rudolph III	1232 – 28 July 1262	County of Rapperswil	Matilda of Kyburg before 1253 two children Matilda of Neuffen before 1259 two children	28 July 1262 aged c.76-77	Children of Rudolph III, probably ruled jointly. Rudolph was titled advocatus since 1210, and assumed the comital title in documents since 1232; as his father died in 1218, it's uncertain if he already was count since his father's death, or if there were a vacancy in the county. Founded Wurmsbach and Weesen abbeys, as well as the Wyden nunnery in Jona; finished the construction of the city and Rapperswil castle, founded Stadtpfarrkirche Rapperswil and supporter of the Rüti Abbey, founded probably a small nunnery at Bollingen.
Ulrich IV	c.1185 Son of Rudolph III	1232 – c.1254?	County of Rapperswil	Unknown	After 1229 or 1254 aged 68–69	
Regency of Rudolph, Count of Habsburg and Walter V, Baron of Vaz (1262–1276)
Rudolph V	1262 (after 28 July); Son of Rudolph IV and Matilda of Neuffen	1262 – 15 January 1283	County of Rapperswil	Unmarried	15 January 1283 aged 20	Born posthumous. Ruled under regencies until 1276.
Elisabeth	c.1240 Daughter of Rudolph IV and Matilda of Kyburg	15 January 1283 – 10 April 1309	County of Rapperswil	Ludwig of Homberg c.1283 two children Rudolf of Habsburg-Laufenburg; 1296 one child	10 April 1309; Rapperswil aged 68–69	Had a (probably elder) full sister, Anna, who married Hartmann V, Count of Kyburg. Half-sister of Rudolph V, ruled alongside her husbands: Ludwig of Homberg (1283–1289); Rudolf of Habsburg-Laufenburg (1296–1309); Elisabeth gave up of her possessions in Western Switzerland to Wernher von Homberg (son from her first marriage) after the death of Wernher's father, and after her own death the remaining lands were inherited by the Laufenburg branch of the Habsburgs.

=== Rapperswil's successor houses ===
Following the death of Ludwig von Homberg who left a son from Elisabeth, Werner, the countess married again with Rudolf of Habsburg-Laufenburg, son of the count of Kyburg. After her death she might have divided her patrimony.

==== House of Homberg ====
- 1289- 21 March 1320: Werner of Homberg, he might have succeeded after his father's death on his part of Elisabeth's patrimony.

==== House of Habsburg-Laufenburg ====
- 10 April 1309 – 21 September 1337: Johann I, inherited his possessions after Elisabeth's death.
- 21 September 1337 – 17 December 1380: Johann II
- 17 December 1380 – 11 January 1392: Johann III
- 11 January 1392 – 18 May 1408: Johann IV, first cousin of Johann III, as son of Rudolf, brother of Johann II.
- 18 May 1408 – 1460: Ursula, married Count Rudolf III of Sulz; They had children.

After Ursula's death in 1460, the Habsburg-Laufenburg patrimony fell to the County of Sulz.

== Members of the House of Rapperswil ==
The genealogy is extremely patchy and incomplete, the family may be in fact extinct several times in the 'male line', estimated at least around 1190 and according to historical documents at 1283, even the female line was continued by Elisabeth von Rapperswil.

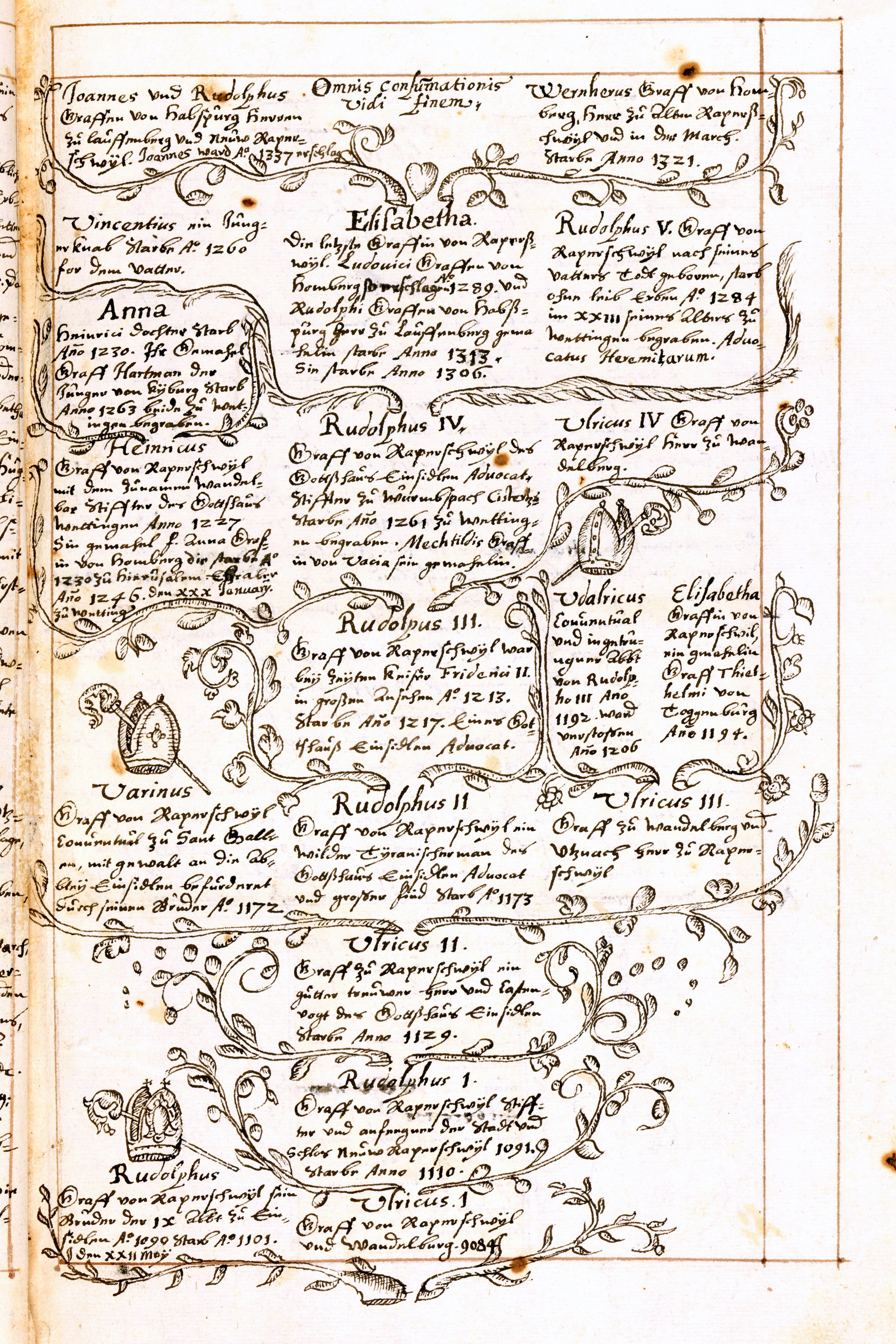
Family tree of Elisabeth von Rapperswil according to Heinrich Murer: B[eatae] Mariae Virg[inis] Marisstella, alias Wettingen, Frauenfeld, Kantonsbibliothek Thurgau, Y 115, around 1631.

The line of counts of Rapperswil may be counted back to the 9th century, when their ancestors were called Counts of Wandelberg:

=== Line of the first counts of Wandelberg ===
- Reginger
  - Rudolf I von Wandelberg
    - Rudolf II von Wandelberg
      - Vezilo von Wandelberg
        - Rudolf
      - Eppo (d.1012)
        - Rudolf III von Wandelberg (d.1048)
          - Ulrich I von Rapperswil (*1036; †1098): Vogt of Einsiedeln, Count of Wandelberg and 1st Count of Rapperswil
          - Wirand (died in Rome)
          - Rudolf (d. 26 May 1101)
  - Wirunt, Wirendus, Wirund, Wem, Wirand, Verendus (d.1026): 996 to 1026 the abbot of Einsiedeln
  - Ottokar

=== House of Rapperswil ===
This list is based on known genealogical trees of the family:

- Ulrich I von Rapperswil (*1036; †1098): Vogt of Einsiedeln, Count of Wandelberg and 1st Count of Rapperswil
  - Rudolf I (* 1059; † 1110), Count of Wandelberg (as Rudolf IV) and Count of Rapperswil (as Rudolf I), possibly abdicated and became 9th abbot of Einsiedeln
    - Ulrich II (* 1084; † 1129), Count of Wandelberg and Rapperswil
      - Rudolf II von Rapperswil († 1173), Count of Wandelberg (as V) and Count of Rapperswil
        - Rudolf III von Rapperswil (* around 1160; † 1217 or 1218), Count of Rapperswil, moved the home of the house Alt-Rapperswil from Altendorf (SZ) to Rapperswil (SG), founded the city of Rapperswil at the former Endingen village
          - Rudolf IV von Rapperswil (1185 - 28 July 1262), Count of Rapperswil, married 1) Matilda of Kyburg, and then, before 1259, 2) Mechthild von Neifen. Cited on 25 June 1250, 27 July 1255 and 3 August 1261.
            - 1) Anna von Rapperswil (* 1230/40; † 30 May 1253); some sources suggest that she was daughter of Count Rudolf and Matilda of Kyburg. The origin of her mother may explain her marriage around 1251/52 with Count Hartmann V of Kyburg, her cousin.
            - 1) Elisabeth von Rapperswil (* 1240; † 10 April 1309), Countess of Rapperswil, married with 1) Count Ludwig von Homberg and later with 2) Count Rudolf von Habsburg-Laufenburg
            - 2) Vinzenz (*1260 †1261)
            - 2) Rudolf V von Rapperswil (* 1262 †15 January 1283), born posthumously, Count of Rapperswil.
          - Ulrich IV von Rapperswil († after 1229 or 1254), Count of Rapperswil, according to Heinrich Murer. Also known as Ulrich of Greifenberg.
          - Heinrich von Rapperswil (d. 30 January 1246, Wettingen), founded Wettingen Abbey; married in 1220 Mechtidis von Wetter, sister of Count Lutold I von Wetter. He married also Anna von Homberg (d. 14 June 1230, Jerusalem). If he had children, he had:
            - Anna (died 1227 or 1240), Heinrich Murer identifies this daughter as Count Hartmann V of Kyburg's wife
          - Guta von Rapperswil (* c.1185; † 1229), married Diethelm I, Count of Toggenburg.
          - Adelheid von Rapperswil (* c.1185; † 1213), married Walter III von Vaz.
          - Unknown sister, married Johann von Strätlingen
      - Heinrich, nothing is known about him;
        - An unknown male, cited as Rodolphus frater eius in 1177
        - U(da)lrich von Rapperswil († 1206): Abbot of Einsiedeln, also mentioned as «OLRICVS. DEI. GRA. HEREMITARV. ABBAS»
      - Ulrich III von Rapperswil († 1155), Count of Wandelburg and possibly 5th Count of Rapperswil, as he is counted in Heinrich Murer's tree, so he might have co-ruled with his brother. Heinrich Murer gives him two children:
        - Ulrich, Heinrich Murer identifies this son as Ulrich, abbot of Einsiedeln († 1206).
        - Elisabetha/Guta († 1226). Heinrich Murer identifies this daughter as Count Diethelm I of Toggenburg's wife
      - Gebezo († c.1153)
      - Warin († 1172), Abbot of Einsiedeln

=== Houses of Homberg and Habsburg-Laufenburg ===
- Elisabeth von Rapperswil (* 1251; † 10 April 1309), 13th Count(ess) of Rapperswil, married with 1) Count Ludwig von Homberg (12th Count of Rapperswil) and later with 2) Count Rudolf III von Habsburg-Laufenburg
  - 1) Cäcilia von Homberg (* 1280; † after 1320): daughter of Countess Elisabeth and Ludwig von Homberg
  - 1) Werner von Homberg-Rapperswil or Hohenberg (* 1284; † 21 March 1320, Genoa): son of Elisabeth von Rapperswil and Ludwig von Homberg; Minnesang, Vogt von Einsiedeln, since 1309 Reichsgraf and Reichsvogt of Waldstätte, inherited territories that today form the northern part of the canton of Schwyz
  - 1) Anna
  - 1) Klara, married Egino V. von Matsch
  - 1) Rudolf
  - 1) Ludwig II von Homberg (d.1315)
  - 2) Johann(es) I. von Habsburg-Laufenburg (* 1 January 1295; † 21 September 1337), 14th Count of Rapperswil, married Agnes von Werd (d.12 June 1352)
    - Johann(es) II. von Habsburg-Laufenburg (*1 January 1330; † 17 December 1380), 15th Count of Rapperswil. Political opponent of Rudolf Brun, Mayor of Zürich, was arrested for two years in Zürich after Brun besieged the city of Rapperswil, Minnesang. Married Verena von Neuenberg (Neuchâtel, d. 1372)
      - Johann(es) III. von Habsburg-Laufenburg (d. 11 January 1392), 16th Count of Rapperswil
      - Verena
    - Adelaide (d.1370), married Heinrich IV von Montfort-Tettnang
    - Agnes, who became a nun in the Säckingen Abbey:
    - Rudolf IV von Habsburg-Laufenburg (d. September 1383), Count of Habsburg-Laufenburg, married Verena Gonzaga
        - Johann(es) IV von Habsburg-Laufenburg (d. 18 May 1408), 17th Count of Rapperswil, married Agnes von Landenburg
          - Ursula von Habsburg-Laufenburg (* before 1400 † 1460), 18th Count(ess) of Rapperswil, married Count Rudolf von Sulz
          - Agnes von Habsburg-Laufenburg (d.1409)
        - Agnes von Habsburg-Laufenburg (d. 1425), married Donat I of Toggenburg
    - An unknown person, brother/sister
    - Elisabeth, married Johann II von Waldburg
    - Gottfried III von Habsburg-Laufenburg (d. 1375), married Elisabeth von Ochsenstein and Agnes von Teck; left no descendants
- Albrecht von Rapperswil (Raprechtswil): Minnesang mentioned in Codex Manesse (folio 192v)

== Bibliography ==
- Eugester, Erwin, Adlige Territorialpolitik in der Ostschweiz. Kirchliche Stiftungen im Spannungsfeld früher landesherrlicher Verdrängungspolitik. Zürich 1991, ISBN 3-90527-868-5.
- Gull, F. (1892). "Die Grafen von Rapperswyl". Archives héraldiques suisses. No. 6. doi:10.5169/seals-744523.
- Sablonier, Roger, Adel im Wandel. Untersuchungen zur sozialen Situation des ostschweizerischen Adels um 1300. Chronos-Verlag, Zürich 1979/2000. ISBN 978-3-905313-55-0.
- Sablonier, Roger, Gründungszeit ohne Eidgenossen: Politik und Gesellschaft in der Innerschweiz um 1300. hier + jetzt, Baden 2008, ISBN 978-3-03919-085-0.
