= Historic monument (Switzerland) =

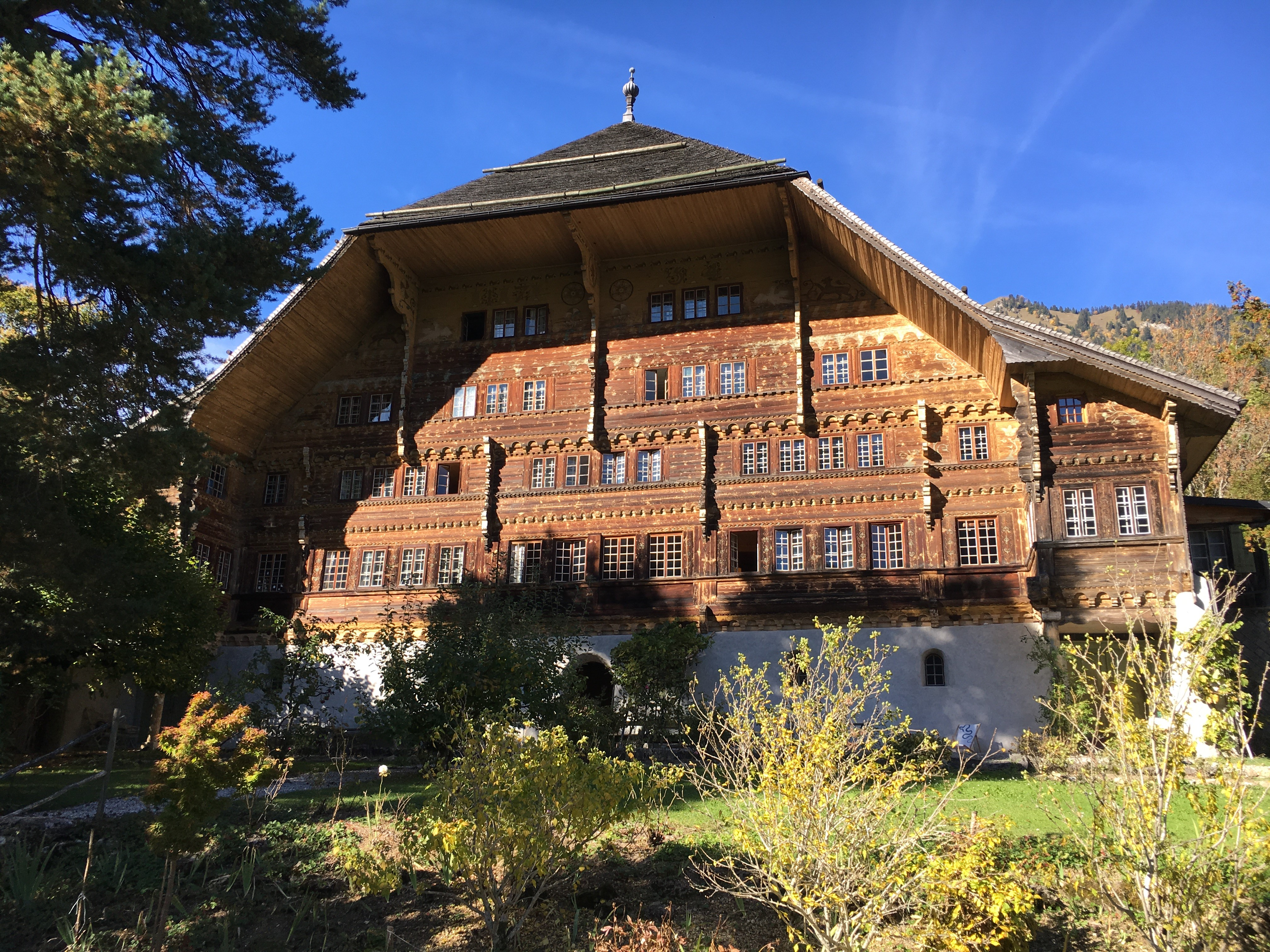
The south façade of the Grand Chalet, bult between 1750 and 1754 and classed as a historic monument.

In Switzerland, the designation as a historic monument is intended to protect a National Heritage Site such as a monument or a building notable for its history or architecture. The list is kept by the organization for Cultural heritage protection in Switzerland.

== History ==
Legally, the concept dates back to September 10, 1898, when the Federal Law on the conservation of monuments and works of art with historical or artistic interest was passed.

The Federal Law on the Protection of Nature and Landscape (LPN) was passed on 1 July 1966. It defines among others the scope of protection, the means and the support of the Confederation and the penal provisions for violations. Section 4 describes the objects involved: Regarding the landscape and local features, sites evocative of the past, natural wonders or monuments as art. 24, par. 2, a. objects of national importance; b. objects of regional and local importance.

The cantons may be required to make and receive expert support from the Confederation. The cantons also have their own regulations that define the different procedures, departments and services of the Township responsible for matters relating to the protection of nature and monuments. For example, the canton of Vaud has a "Law on the Protection of Nature, Monuments and Sites (LPNMS) came into force on 10 December 1969

On January 16th 1991, the "Ordinance on the protection of nature and landscape" of the Federal Council came into force.
