= Roger Sablonier =

Swiss historian and writer

- Sablonier probably in the late 2000s
- Born: 16 April 1941; Uster
- Died: 8 June 2010 (aged 69); Zug
- Education: University of Zürich
- Occupations: Historian, writer
- Years active: 1967–2010
- Notable work: Gründungszeit ohne Eidgenossen: Politik und Gesellschaft in der Innerschweiz um 1300 (2008) among others

Roger Sablonier (16 April 1943 – 8 June 2010) was a Swiss historian and writer of non-fiction publications, and Emeritus (Prof. Dr.) of the faculty of the University of Zürich.

== Biography ==
Born in Uster on 16 April 1941 as the son of Mary Ida (née Wunderli) and Carlo Demetrio Sablonier, Roger Sablonier grew up with two sisters. He studied history, French language history and medieval studies at the University of Zürich and received the PhD (Dr. phil.) in 1967. From 1972 to 1979, Sablonier was assistant professor of history, and habilitated in 1977 in Zürich. Beginning in 1979, Sablonier taught as an associate professor of medieval history. From 1984 to 2006, he was an ordained professor at the University of Zürich, and since 2006 Emeritus (Emeritierter Ordinarius für Geschichte des Mittelalters) of the historical faculty.

Roger Sablonier treated the past as a serious matter, but related to the archeology, mischief overcame, and he used to say to his students: One can dig a hole anywhere in this country, but if you only dig deep enough, it's a safe bet that you'll find any bones [human remains].

Roger Sablonier was citizen of the municipalities Uster in the canton of Zürich and Cauco (Graubünden). He died on 8 June 2010 in Zug on cardialic failure (according to press release: Herzversagen).

== Work ==
=== Research ===
Among other research projects, Roger Sablonier was the initiator of the e-learning project for archival work Ad fontes and directed the research project on Kinder der Landstrasse opposing the Swiss Pro Juventute foundation. Sablonier engaged especially in the current discourse of history and culture in the implementation of the historical and scientific research, also in exhibitions and museums, and oversaw the reorganization of the archives of the Einsiedeln Abbey.

=== Focus ===
Priorities of Roger Sablonier's research and publication were the history of nobility, the rural society of the late European Middle Ages, the political culture of the Old Swiss Confederacy, and in writing. So he sat down among them the founding myth and glorification of Swiss history (Rütlischwur etc.) whose Roger Sablonier discussed and published very critical.

=== Publications (excerpt) ===
- 2010: Vaterländische Schatzsuche und Archäologie am Morgarten. In: Fund-Stücke – Spuren-Suche, published by Adriano Boschetti-Maradi et al., Zurich Studies in the History of Art, Georges-Bloch-Annual, University of Zurich, Institute of Art History, 2010/11, Vol. 17/18, Berlin 2011, p. 610–631.
- 2008: Gründungszeit ohne Eidgenossen: Politik und Gesellschaft in der Innerschweiz um 1300. hier + jetzt, Baden 2008, ISBN 978-3-03919-085-0.
- 2001: Walter Leimgruber, Thomas Meier und Roger Sablonier, redigiert von Bernadette Kaufmann: Kinder zwischen Rädern. Kurzfassung des Forschungsberichts «Das Hilfswerk für die Kinder der Landstrasse». Published buy in order of Bundesamt für Kultur «und Kinder» 20, Nr. 67, November 2001, Zürich 2001.
- 1994: Die Grafen von Rapperswil: Kontroversen, neue Perspektiven und ein Ausblick auf die "Gründungszeit" der Eidgenossenschaft um 1300. In: Der Geschichtsfreund. Mitteilungen des Historischen Vereins der fünf Orte 147 p. 5-44.
- 1979/2000: Adel im Wandel. Untersuchungen zur sozialen Situation des ostschweizerischen Adels um 1300. Chronos-Verlag, Zürich, ISBN 978-3-905313-55-0.
- 1971: Krieg und Kriegertum in der Crònica des Ramon Muntaner. Eine Studie zum spätmittelalterlichen Kriegswesen aufgrund katalanischer Quellen. In: Geist und Werk der Zeiten 31, Bern 1971.

== Awards (excerpt) ==
- University of Zürich: Emeritierter Ordinarius für Geschichte des Mittelalters
