= Toggenburg (disambiguation) =

Toggenburg may refer to:

- Toggenburg, a region and constituency in the Swiss canton of St. Gallen
- the Counts of Toggenburg, the medieval counts eponymous of the region
  - Elisabeth von Toggenburg née von Matsch (1380's — around 1439), last countess of Toggenburg
- Toggenburg (goat), a breed of goat
- Cyre de Toggenburg, a Swiss French painter
- Toggenburg-Chronik, 1411 illuminated manuscript

It may also refer to:

- "Toggenburg Mountain", a ski area in Fabius, New York

== See also ==
- Taggenberg
- Toggenburg Succession (Old Zurich War, 1440–46)
- Toggenburg War (Second war of Villmergen, 1712)
