= Friedau Castle =

Castle in Zizers, Switzerland

- Schelmenturm
- Zizers
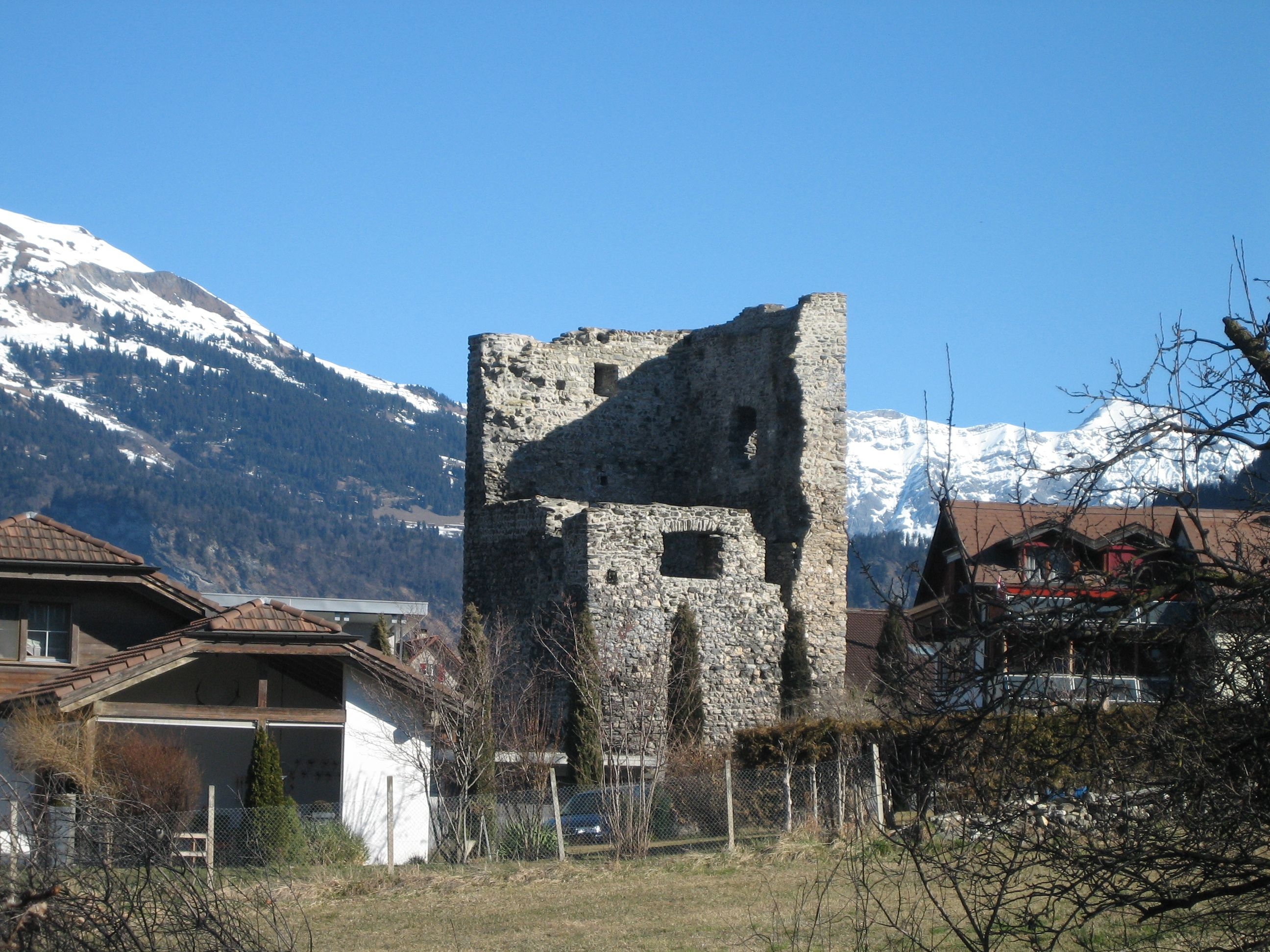
- Ruins of Friedau

Site information
- Type: lowland castle
- Code: CH-GR
- Condition: ruin

Location
- Location within Canton of Graubünden Location within Switzerland
- Coordinates: 46°56′3.3″N 9°33′46″E
- Height: 448 m above the sea

Site history
- Built: about 1200 to 1300
- Materials: Rubble stone

Friedau Castle is a ruined castle in the municipality of Zizers of the Canton of Graubünden in Switzerland.

== History ==
In 955 Emperor Otto I granted his estates in Zizers to the Bishop of Chur. Friedau Castle may have been built on the site of one of the buildings from this 10th century grant. Construction on the castle begun under Bishop Volkart von Neuenburg (1237-1251) but was completed under Heinrich IV von Montfort (1251-1272). Once it was completed it became the administrative center of the Herrschaft and the home of the bishop's landvogt.

Because the bishop often needed loans and donations, he used the castle as collateral for loans or as a reward for donations. In 1358 it was given as collateral to Beringers von Landenberg and four years later, in 1362, Bishop Peter Gelyto gave it to Kunigunde von Toggenburg. The Toggenburgs held the castle until the death of Frederick VII in 1436 and the extinction of the Toggenburg family. It appears that the castle had already fallen into ruin by 1387 and the bishop was just granting the rights to the lands and taxes associated with the castle. With those rights, the bishop included a clause that if the castle was rebuilt, the lands would return to him.

The castle must have been rebuilt sometime after the extinction of the Toggenburgs, because in 1503 there was once again a vogt at Friedau. In 1550 the chronicler Ulrich Campell recorded that the castle was a tower surrounded by a wall and moat. In 1649 the bishop sold the castle to the Vier Dörfer (four villages: Zizers, Igis, Trimmis and Untervaz). From then on the castle was used as a prison and gradually became known as the Schelmenturm. In 1880 the tower was heavily damaged in a fire which destroyed much of Zizers. The heat was so intense that the stones in the wall cracked and two large rents opened up in the tower.

During an archeological excavation of the tower in 2016 several finger and foot bones as well as a leg bone were discovered. Initial speculation was that the bones came from tortured prisoners. However, Carbon-14 dating found that the bones dated from before the tower was built in the 13th century.

== Castle site ==
The castle is located in the center of Zizers. It is a square tower about 11.5 by 11.5 meters (38 ft × 38 ft) and has walls that are up to 2.3 m (7.5 ft) thick. It was originally four stories tall with a high entrance on the second story east side. Following the 1880 fire two large cracks have opened up in the walls.

== Gallery ==
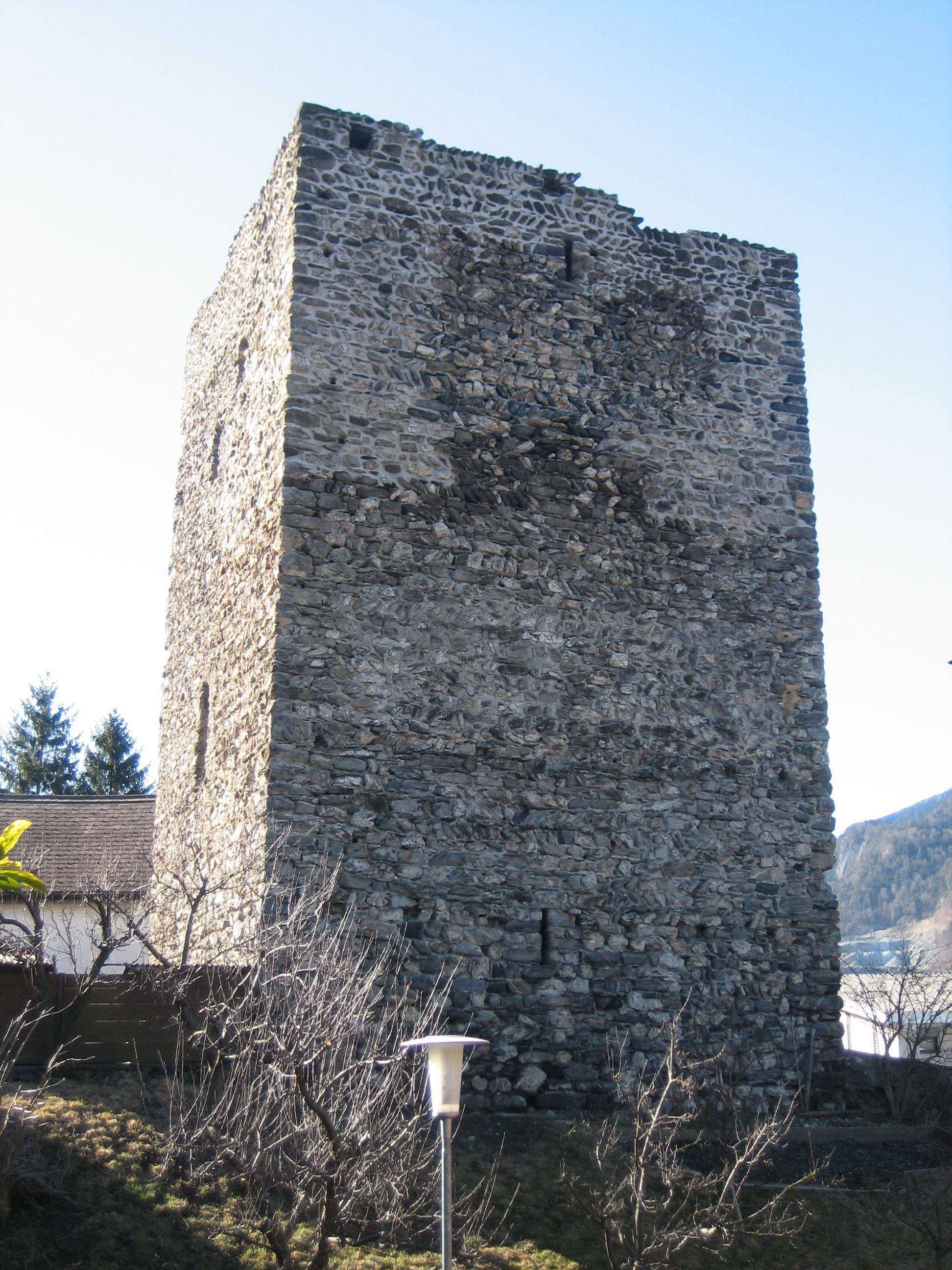
Eastern side

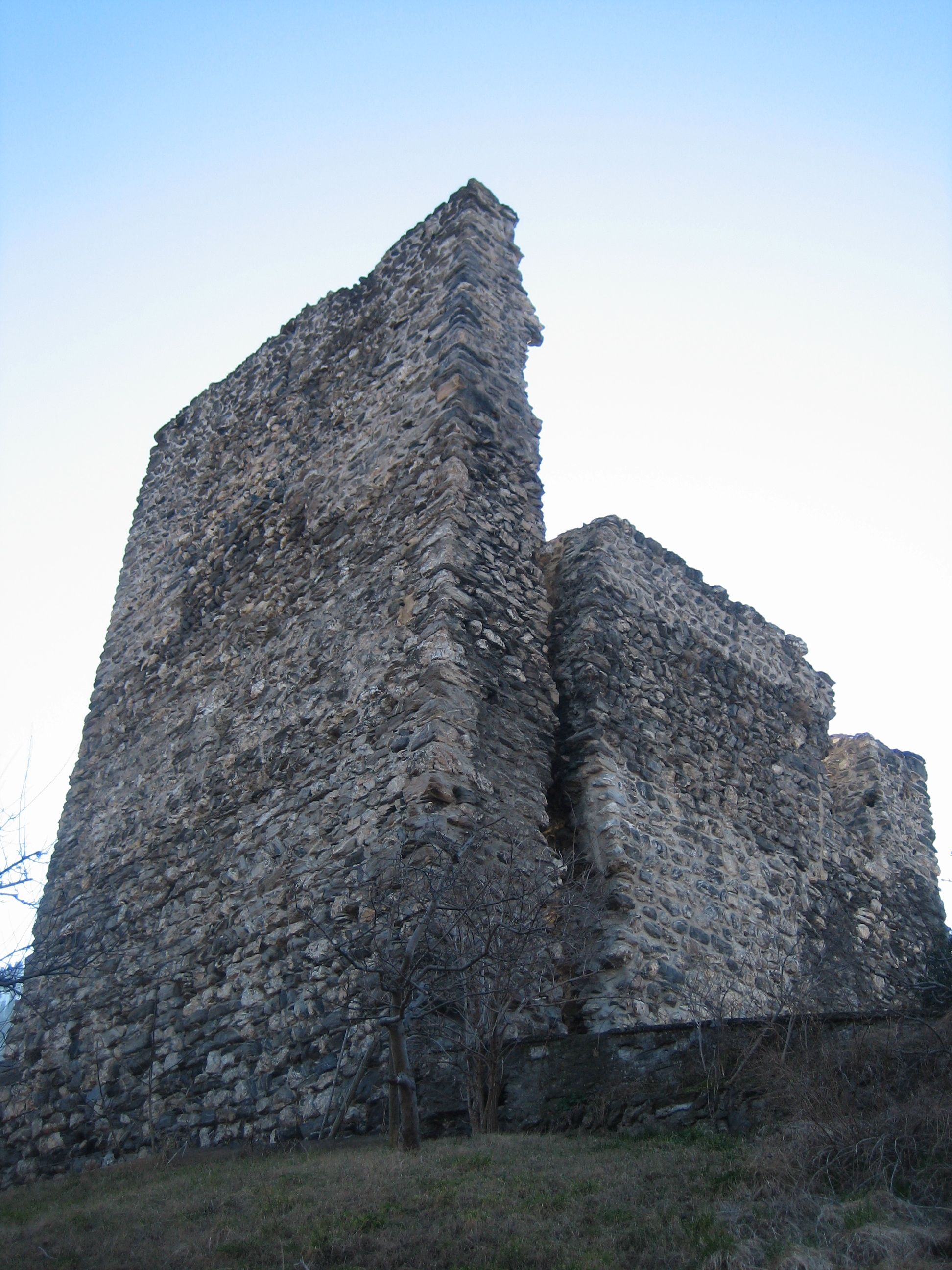
North-west side

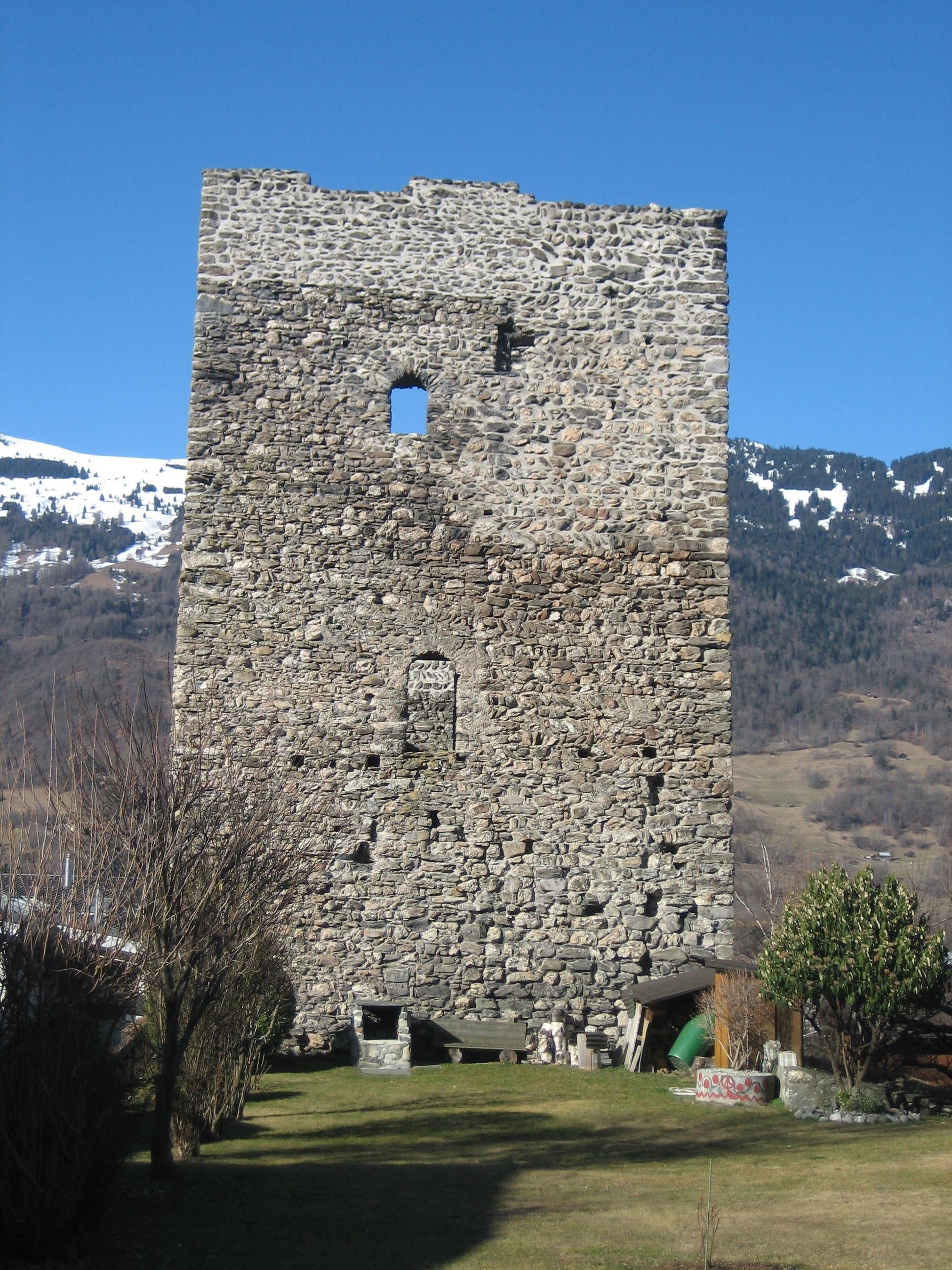
South side

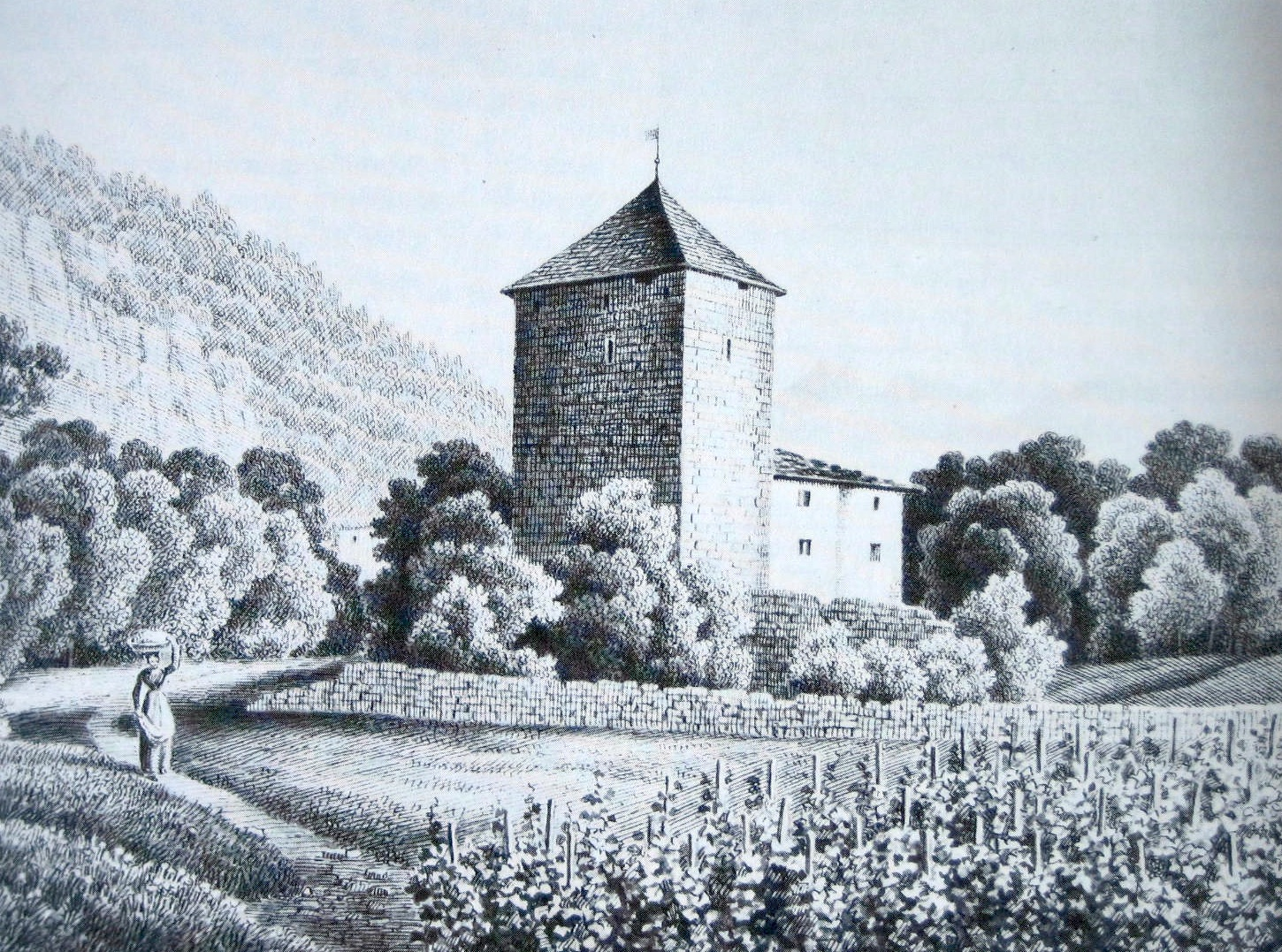
Friedau Castle around 1800

== See also ==
- List of castles in Switzerland
