= Toggenburg Bible =

1411 illuminated manuscript, Old Swiss Confederacy

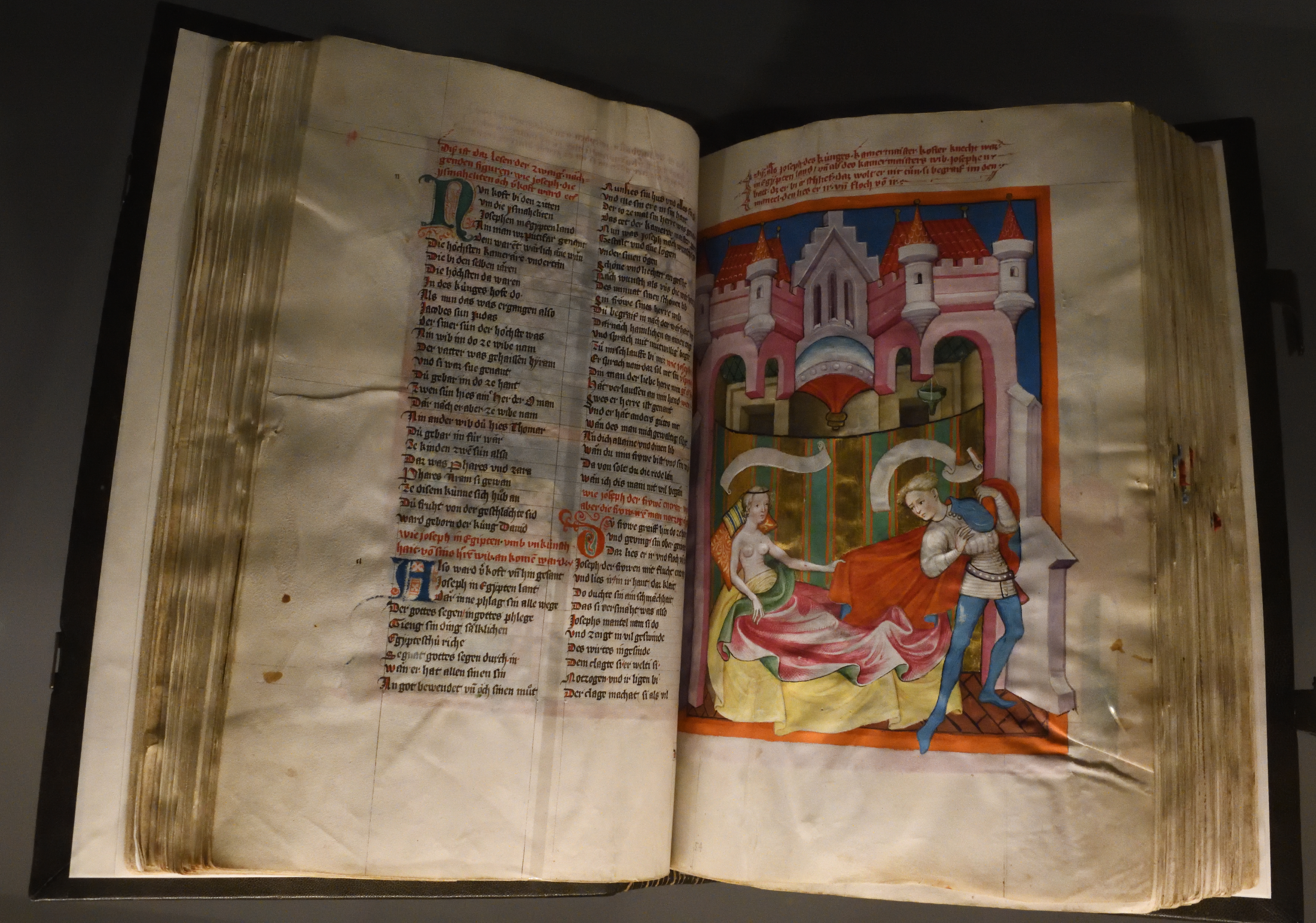
A page from the High Gothic Toggenburg Chronicle

The Toggenburg-Chronik (also known as the Toggenburg Bible, Toggenburg World Chronicle, German: Toggenburg-Bibel, or Toggenburg-Weltchronik) is an illuminated manuscript that was created c. 1411 for Frederick VII, Graf of Toggenburg and his wife, Gräfin Elisabeth von Matsch. Toggenburg is a region of what is now Canton St. Gallen in Switzerland, which is in the general vicinity of Liechtenstein. The codex was produced by a local chaplain, Dietrich von Lichtensteig, or "Dietrich of Lichtensteig." Von Lichtensteig based his manuscript on a previous Weltchronik by Rudolph von Ems. Per Barbara Wilk-Mincu, the artist who created the illustrations "most likely worked in Konstanz [and] seems to have been trained in the Prague Wenceslas workshop, but has influences from South Tyrol and Verona."

Since 1889 the Toggenburg Bible is held in the collection of the Berlin State Museums (German: Staatliche Museen zu Berlin), identification number Hs.78 E 1. A facsimile of the chronicle, edited by Fedja Anzelewsky, was published 1960 by Verlag Woldemar Klein.

The book consists of 267 parchment sheets with 149 miniatures in opaque colors. It includes the complete text of the world chronicle of Rudolf von Ems: from the beginning of the world to the book of Solomon. The text is expanded to include descriptions of non-Biblical parallel events, such as the story of the Trojan War. Central events are depicted in great detail in numerous, almost side-touching, miniatures.

== See also ==
- Swiss illustrated chronicles
- Counts of Toggenburg
- Rüti Monastery and Rüti Reformed Church
- Old Zürich War (1440–1446)
