= Frederick VII of Toggenburg =

Nobleman of Swiss Confederation (c. 1370–1436)

Friedrich VII, Count of Toggenburg
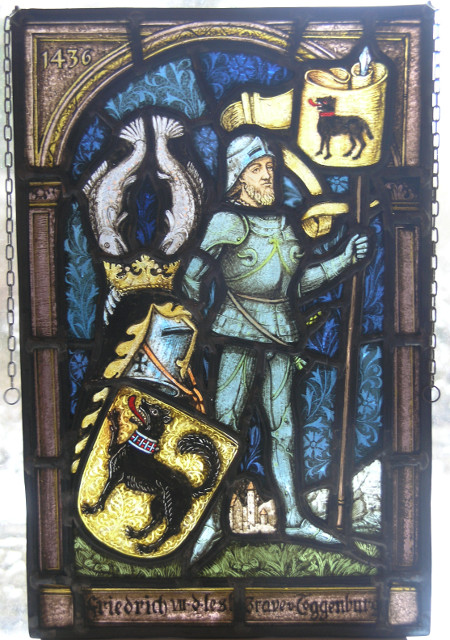
- Stained glass window of Frederick VII
- Born: c. 1370; Solavers Castle, near Grüsch, Prättigau/Davos District (now Graubünden, Switzerland)
- Died: 30 April 1436; Feldkirch, Vorarlberg, Austria
- Buried: Rüti Monastery, Rüti, Zürich
- Noble family: House of Toggenburg
- Spouse: Elisabeth von Matsch
- Issue: Johannes von Toggenburg (illegitimate)
- Father: Diethelm, Count of Toggenburg
- Mother: Katharina of Werdenberg-Heiligenberg

Friedrich VII, count of Toggenburg (c. 1370 – 30 April 1436), was the last of the Counts of Toggenburg who ruled in what would become Switzerland. His death without heirs or a will led to the Old Zürich War.

== Early life ==
Born at Solavers Castle near Grüsch in the district of Prättigau/Davos in what is now the Swiss canton of Graubünden, he was the son of Diethelm and Katharina von Werdenberg-Heiligenberg. After 1387, he was at the head of the line of succession for the family. In 1391, he married Elisabeth von Matsch.

== Career ==
He was only loosely involved in the daily operations of his lands, but was very involved in military affairs. He was a member of a small group of very successful military leaders in the region. Until 1406 he was a condottiero for the Austrians for which he received rights to the cities of Sargans, Windegg, Freudenberg and Nidberg. He then made peace with his enemies, which protected his old and new estates.

On 21 January 1407 Fridrich von Toggenburg, Lord at (German: zu) Brettengow and Tafas, donated to "his own and the salvation of his ancestors who were buried [at the Rüti church] and where he also expects to be buried", the church rights of Wangen in der March to the Rüti Monastery, sealed by Fridrich and the knights Herman von Landenberg, Johans von Bonstetten from Ustra, and Herman von der Hochenlandenberg.

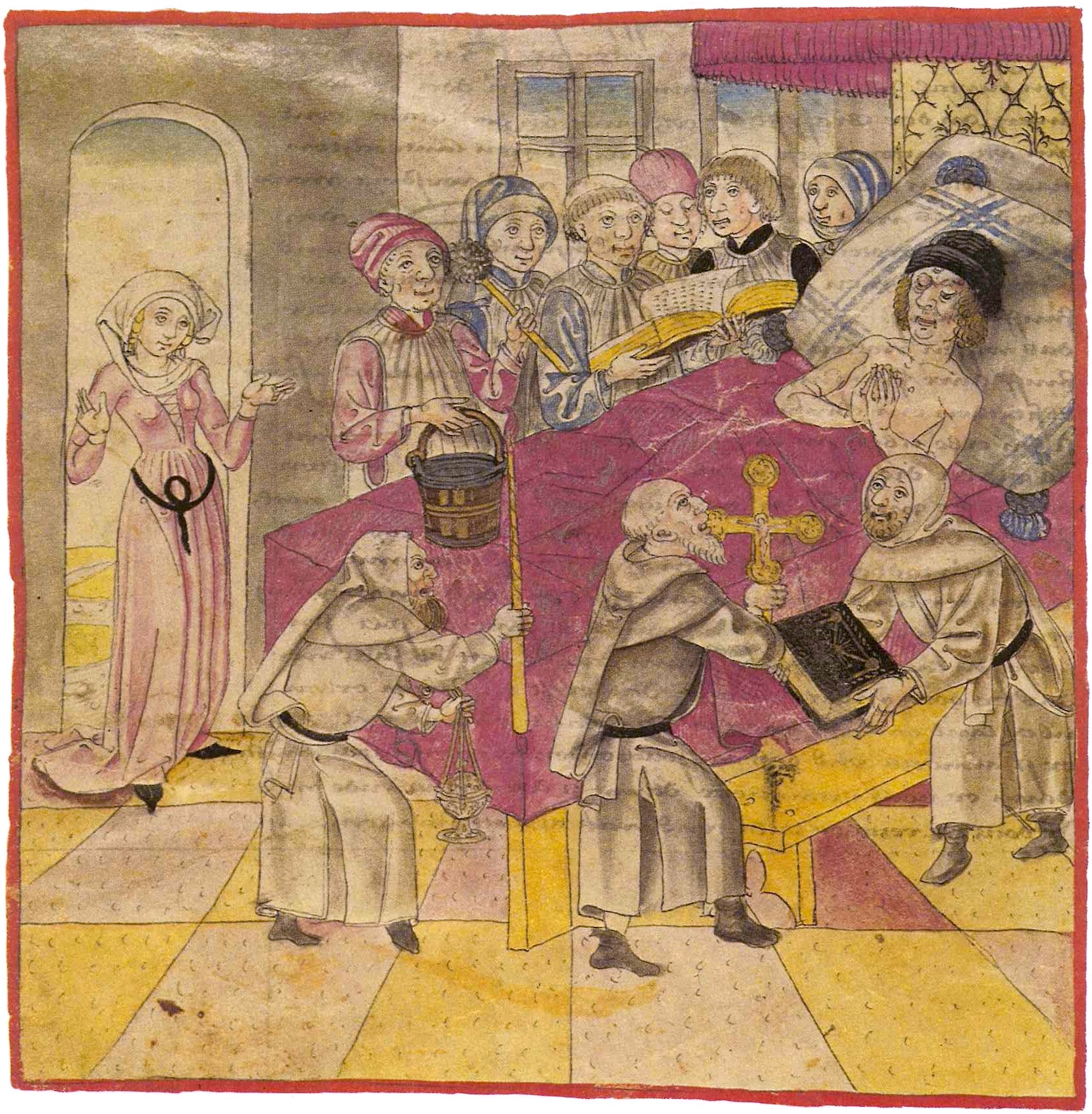
Death of Friedrich VII in Feldkirch, 1436

In 1417, he acquired the rights over the city of Feldkirch and in 1424 added Rheineck and Altstätten. Following his successful invasion of Appenzell, in 1428 at the end of the Appenzell Wars, he had acquired almost all the Austrian possessions from Rheineck to Montafon as well as the county of Werdenburg from Sargans to the upper regions of Lake Zurich.

== Death ==
While he did have at least one illegitimate son, Johannes, he died without heirs or a will on 30 April 1436 and was buried in the Rüti Monastery respectively Rüti Church. The lords of Raron, Montfort-Tettnang, Sax-Misox, Brandis, and Aarburg all had claims on the Toggenburg lands. When the canton of Zürich claimed the Toggenburg lands followed by the cantons of Schwyz and Glarus, the Old Zürich War broke out.

== See also ==
- Toggenburg-Chronik
