= Rüti Reformed Church =

Church in Zurich, Switzerland

Reformierte Kirche Rüti
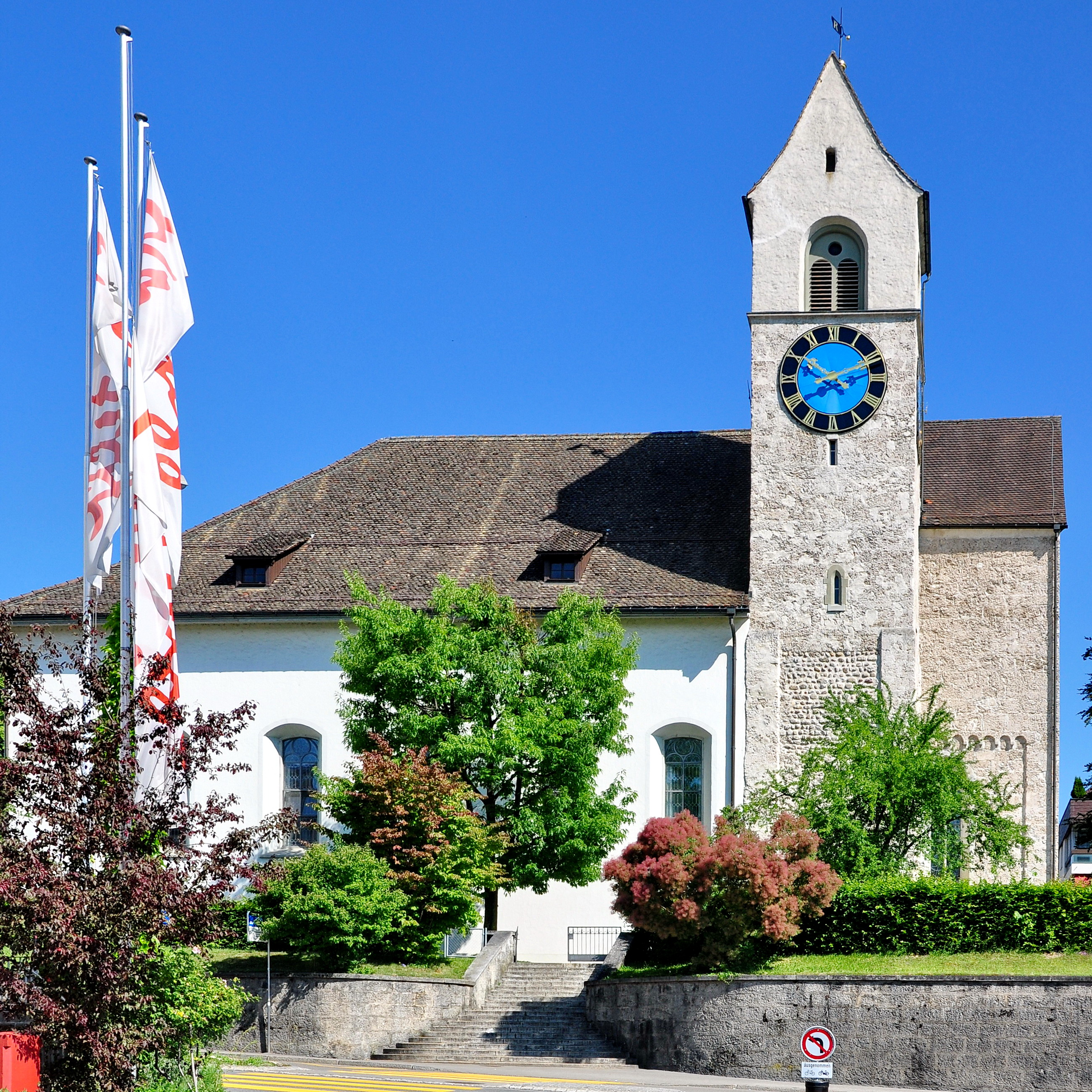
- The former church of the Rüti Monastery as seen from Bandwiesstrasse, showing the first Romanesque construction phase and the stairs that were added in the 1930s by replacing the former cemetery, now a small park.

Religion
- Affiliation: Reformed
- District: Evangelical Reformed Church of the Canton of Zürich

Location
- Location: Rüti, Canton of Zürich; Switzerland
- Interactive map of Reformierte Kirche Rüti
- Coordinates: 47.2593°N 8.8489°E

Architecture
- Type: Church
- Style: Romanesque/Baroque/Classicism
- Completed: around 1219 (first Romanesque church); around 1250 (expansion); around 1283 (Romanesque church finished); 1710 (renewal); 1770 (renewal)

Website
- Official website (in German)

Reformierte Kirche Rüti (native German name, literally: Rüti Reformed Church) is an Evangelical Reformed church in the Swiss municipality of Rüti in the Canton of Zürich. It was built between 1214 and 1219 AD as the Romanesque style church of the then Premonstratensian Kloster Rüti, an abbey that was founded in 1206 by the House of Regensberg and suppressed in 1525 as part of the Reformation in Zürich.

== Location ==
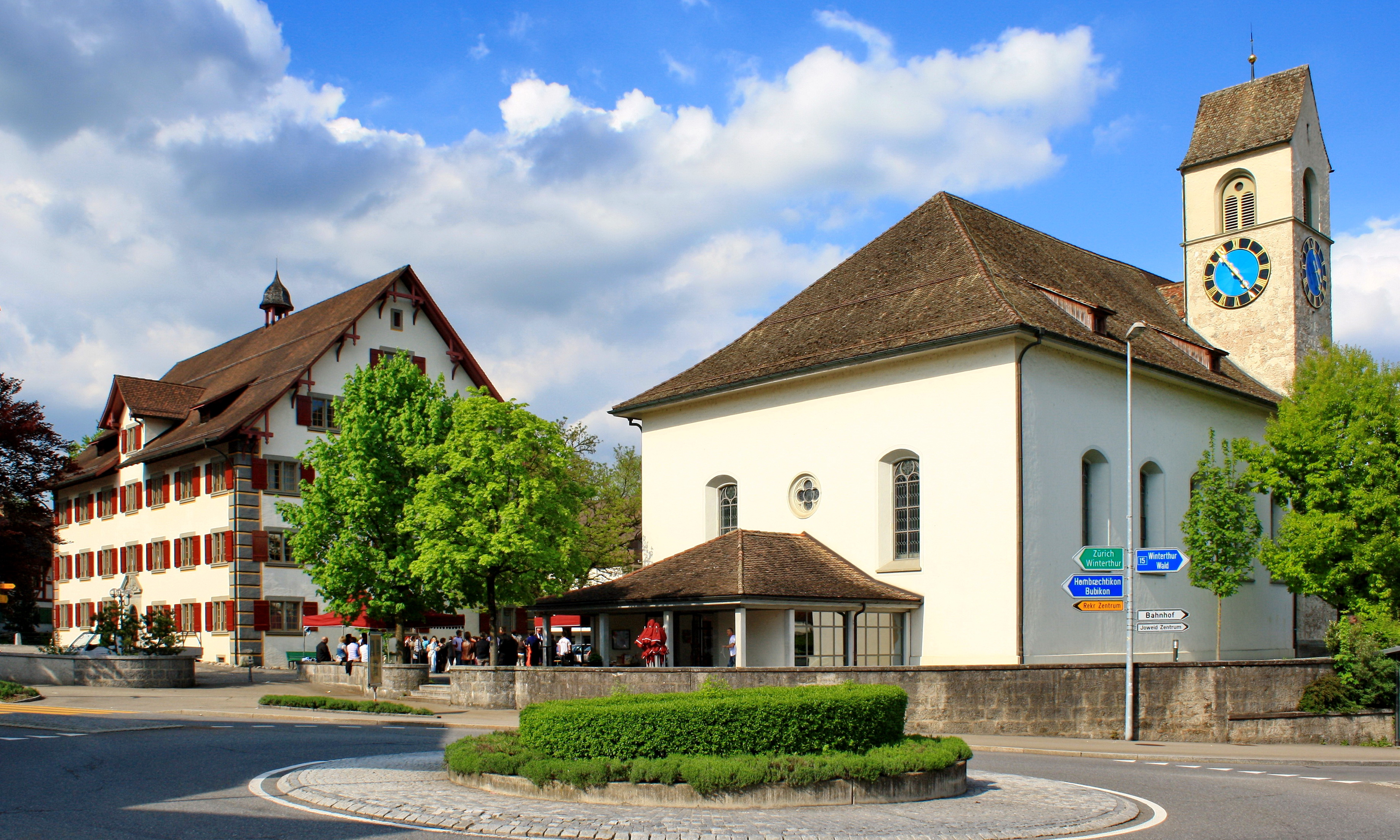
Amthaus and church buildings at Klosterhof

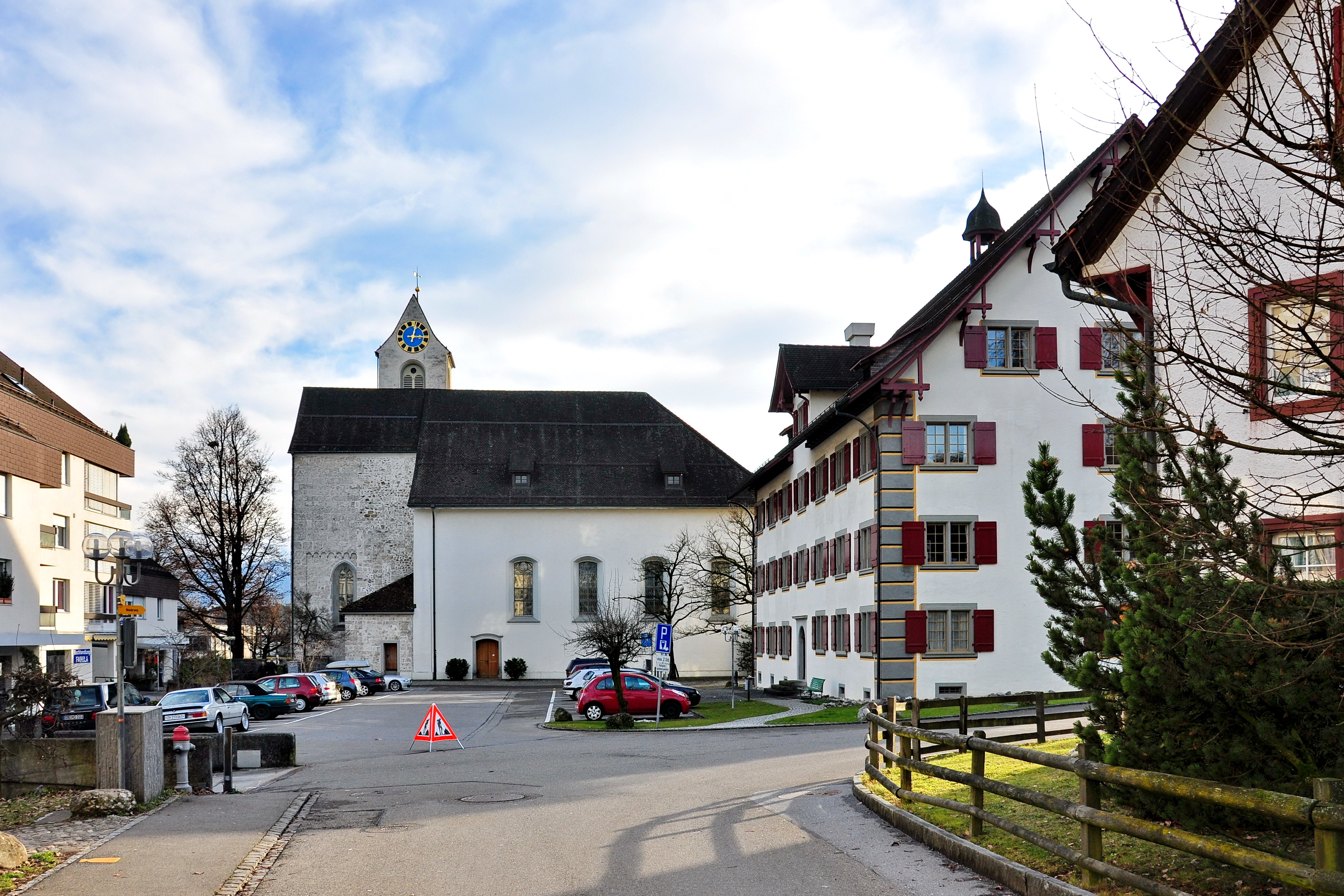

The church is situated in the center of the municipality of Rüti on a small rocky plateau near the Jona River at the site of the former abbey which is called Amthof respectively Klosterhof. Northwest of the parish church there is the rectory called Spitzer-Liegenschaft and to the west the Amthaus building which was rebuilt in 1706 when a fire partially destroyed the church and most of the remaining buildings of the abbey.

== Architecture ==
In 1214 AD the canons of Premonstratensian abbey laid the foundation stone, and they first built the presbytery and two apses. The monastery church was connected to the cloister. The tower of the present church dates back to the first construction phase to 1219, together with the choir and the northern side chapel which were rebuilt respectively expanded from 1250 to 1283. The construction works of the church must have been largely completed when in 1250 an indulgence was granted on the occasion of the fair festival year, and again, "to the promotion and maintenance of the precious building of St Mary's Church" when the construction was completed probably in 1283. In the subsequent 200 years, especially the aisles with tombs and monuments from lower and higher nobility in the area of the present north-eastern Switzerland crowded. To 1439 - 1442 the Toggenburg chapel was added, and the abbots Markus Wiler and Felix Klauser (the abbey's last abbot) let renew fundamentally the church building, documented by the engraving 1499 on the portal of the church. The church was then a Romanesque three-nave system of stately proportions.

On 3 December 1706 a large fire on resulted in severe damage to the buildings and damaged the choir stalls. The clock tower was destroyed, the bells melted and then fell through the burnt-out tower. The Baroque reconstruction of the church after the fire of 1706 took over the late Romanesque choir, but was modest in dimensions. The church was repaired again in 1710, and new bells and a new movement were added. The separation wall between the former lay church and the monk church was demolished and the church services held in the Gothic nave and choir, because the population of the parish had doubled to 700 people. In 1770, when the three-aisled basilica was damaged again, it was rebuilt as a hall church in late Baroque respectively early Classicism style. The longitudinal walls of the side aisles were added by a new western wall and the nave simultaneously shortened by 12 metres (39 ft). The outer walls of the aisles were raised to roof level, the mainstays have been removed, as well as all the old elements of the building outside that wall including the Toggenburgerkapelle of 1439.

In 1903, Rüti had filed an application for the construction of a new church, but instead the canton of Zürich allowed to build a new cemetery. As early as 1930, the old cemetery at the church was demolished down to the original level, and then a staircase from the main street was built, however, not one new church access was added. Minor renovations were carried out in 1935 and 1936, archaeological investigations in 1962 and 1971 and 1972, and in particularly in 1982. In the ground between the church and the Amthaus building, the former monastery's church dimensions are highlighted.

== Interior ==
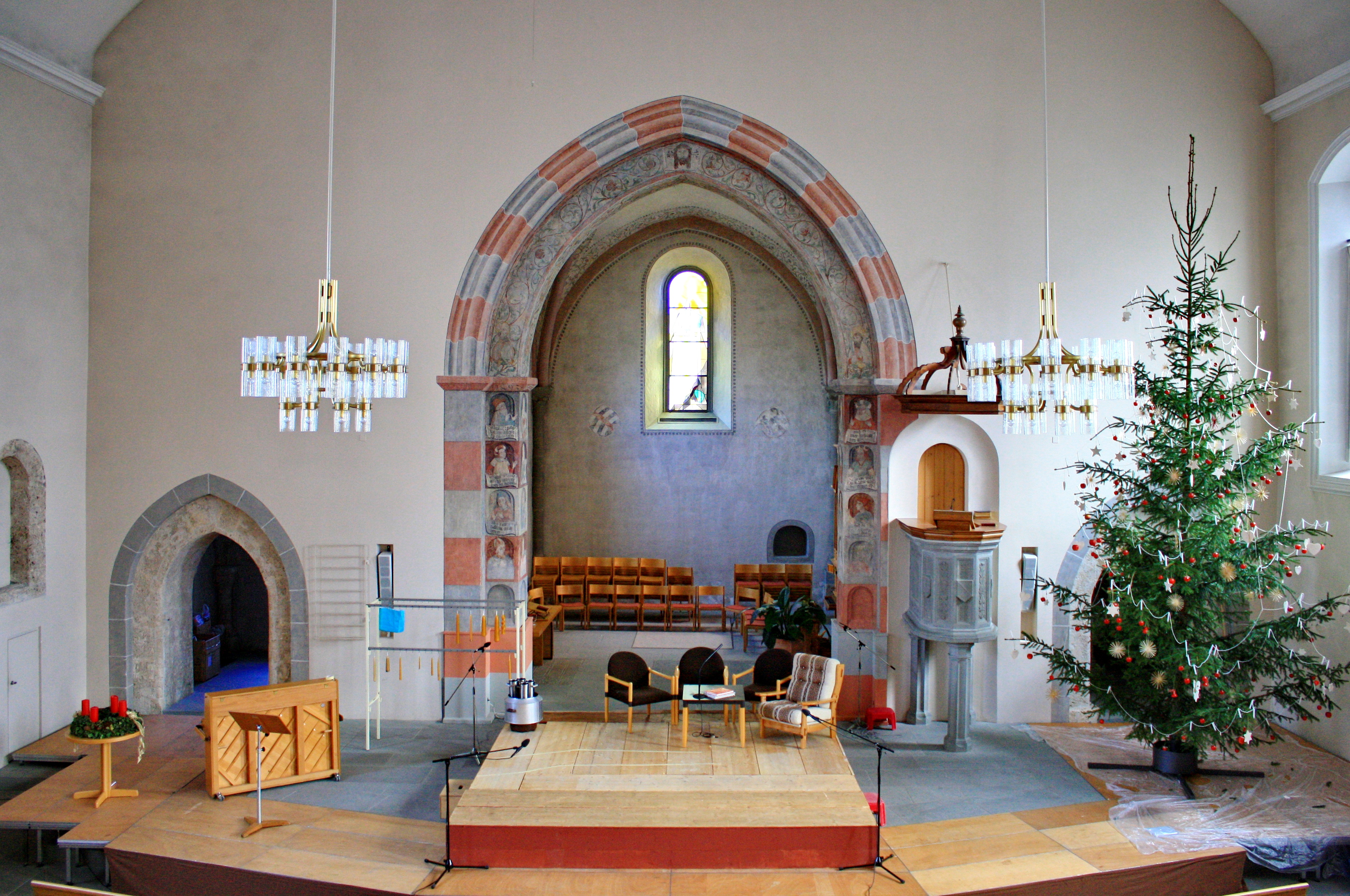
Choir of the church

Abbot Markus Wyler initiated the Last Judgement fresco on the chancel arch, donated by Baron Bernhard Gradner and Veronika von Starckenberg. The work on the pillars of the choir arch were re-executed in 1492 by the Swiss artist Hans Haggenberg. The gothic windows and the wall tabernacle and the coat of arms in the choir (1490) are also works donated by abbot Wyler who is buried nearby in the choir's ground floor. It is decorated with Israelite kings, prophets, priests, and the parable of the ten virgins which adorn the chancel arch, and eight women from the early days of Christianity, represented with their symbols: Dorothea with the basket of roses, Mary Magdalene with the ointments bush, Appolonia with forceps and tooth, Ursula with arrow, Catherine with wheel and sword, Barbora tower, chalice and host, Margareta with cross and dragons and Helena in search of the cross of Christ. On the east wall two coats of arms memorized the founder family, the House of Regensberg and the Counts of Toggenburg.

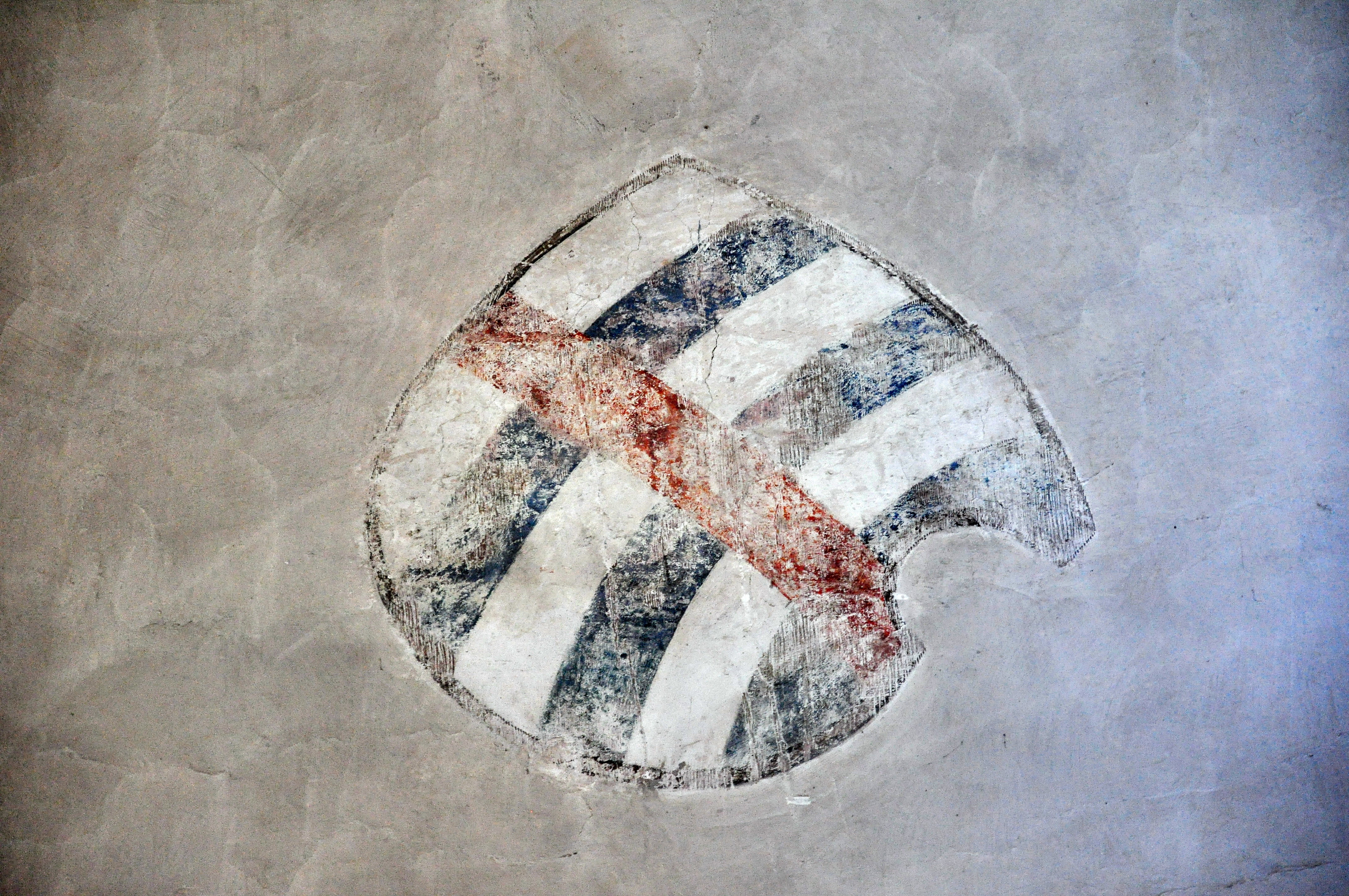
Coats of arms of the House of Regensberg

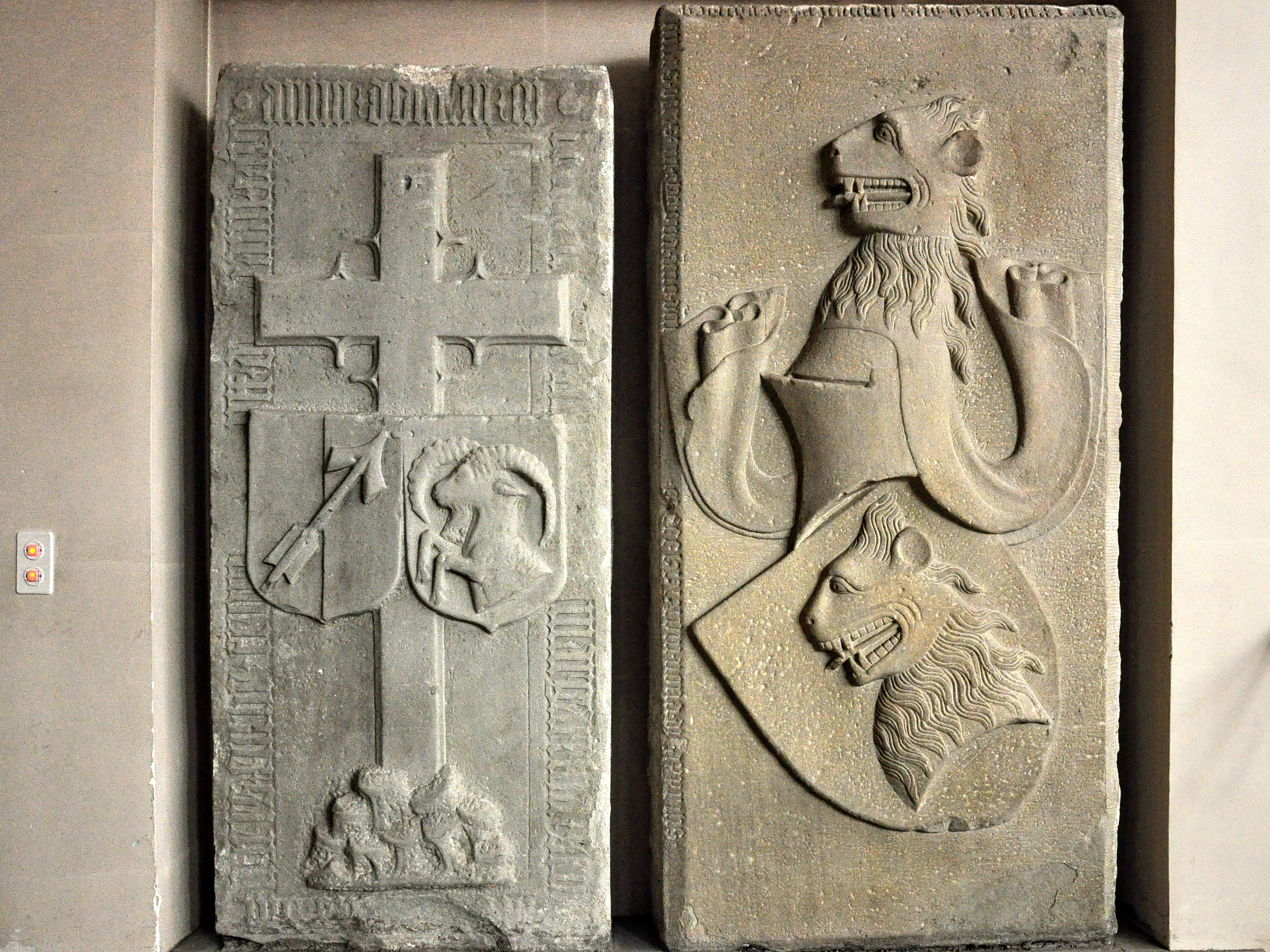
Ledger stones beside the nave

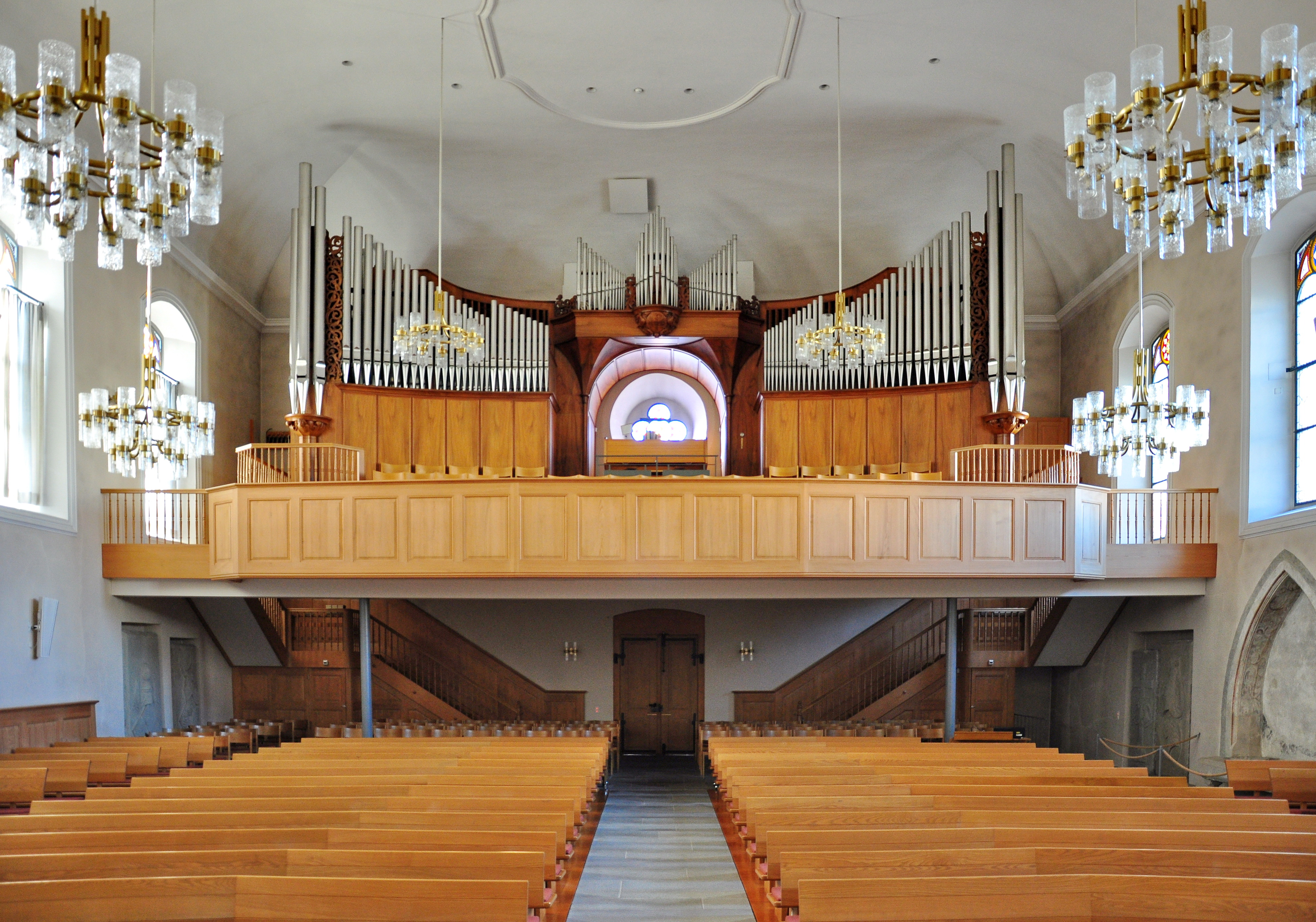
Gallery and pipe organ

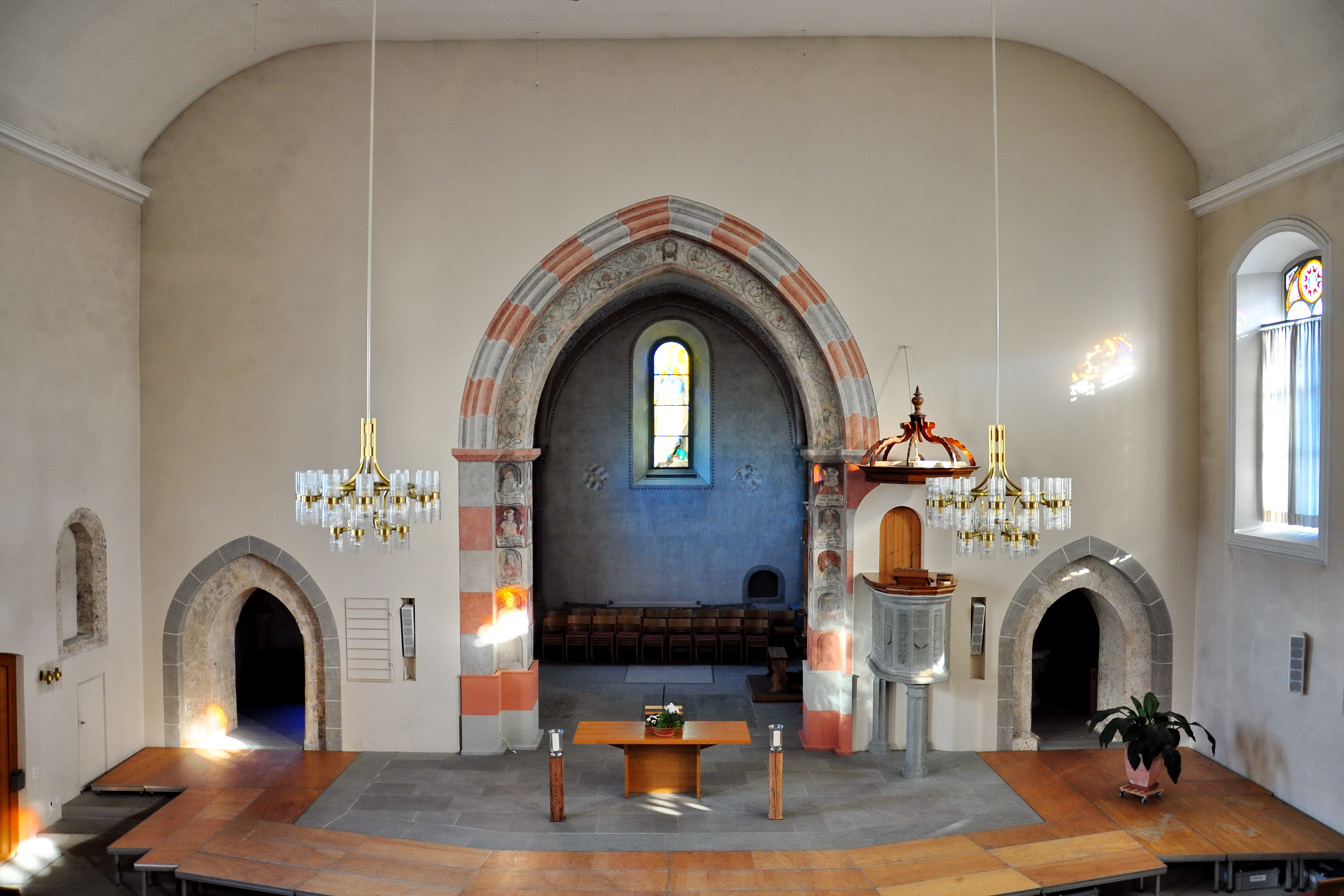
Choir and altar

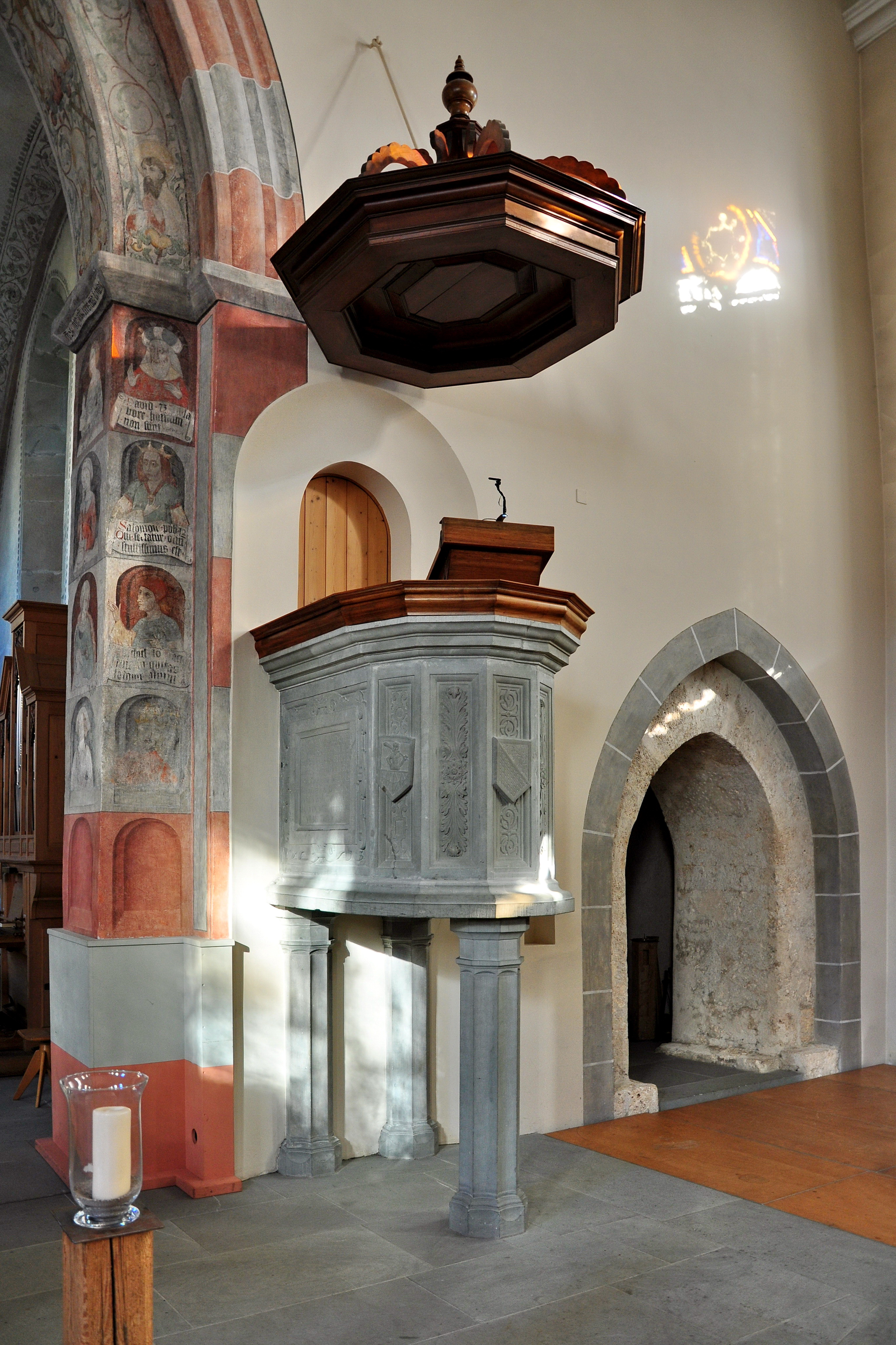
Pulpit and probably late 1490s frescos

The Episcopal collection of the Gallen Abbey includes the main altar of the monastery church, likely a late work by Hans Leu der Ältere around 1500. During the Reformation in Zürich the altar was moved to the Wurmsbach nunnery on Obersee lake shore where it remained until 1798. In 1872, the western gallery was built, one year later the Speich organ from Rapperswil was added. In 1903, Erich Honegger donated a Gothic baptismal font made of white sandstone. On occasion of the renewal work, the choir paintings from 1492 reappeared and restored in 1962 and 1963. The conservators assigned to relocate the remaining six medieval grave slabs from the longitudinal walls of the nave to the choir. The seating, wainscot and wooden floor and well-preserved interior parts were dispelled in the choir and are exhibited in the abbey's museum in the Amthaus building. Between 1980 and 1982, a comprehensive restoration of the nave was conducted which preserved the original three-aisled building, but the premises also allowed to make the nave more accessible. The five-month archaeological excavations covered the entire nave and the tombs of the noble families, bailiffs and their women and children in the nave and choir, as well as the foundations of the massive columns and the walls of the chancel screen. The nave was lowered to the ground level of the original monastery church in order to improve the view of the liturgical center with the communion table and the Gothic choir arch.

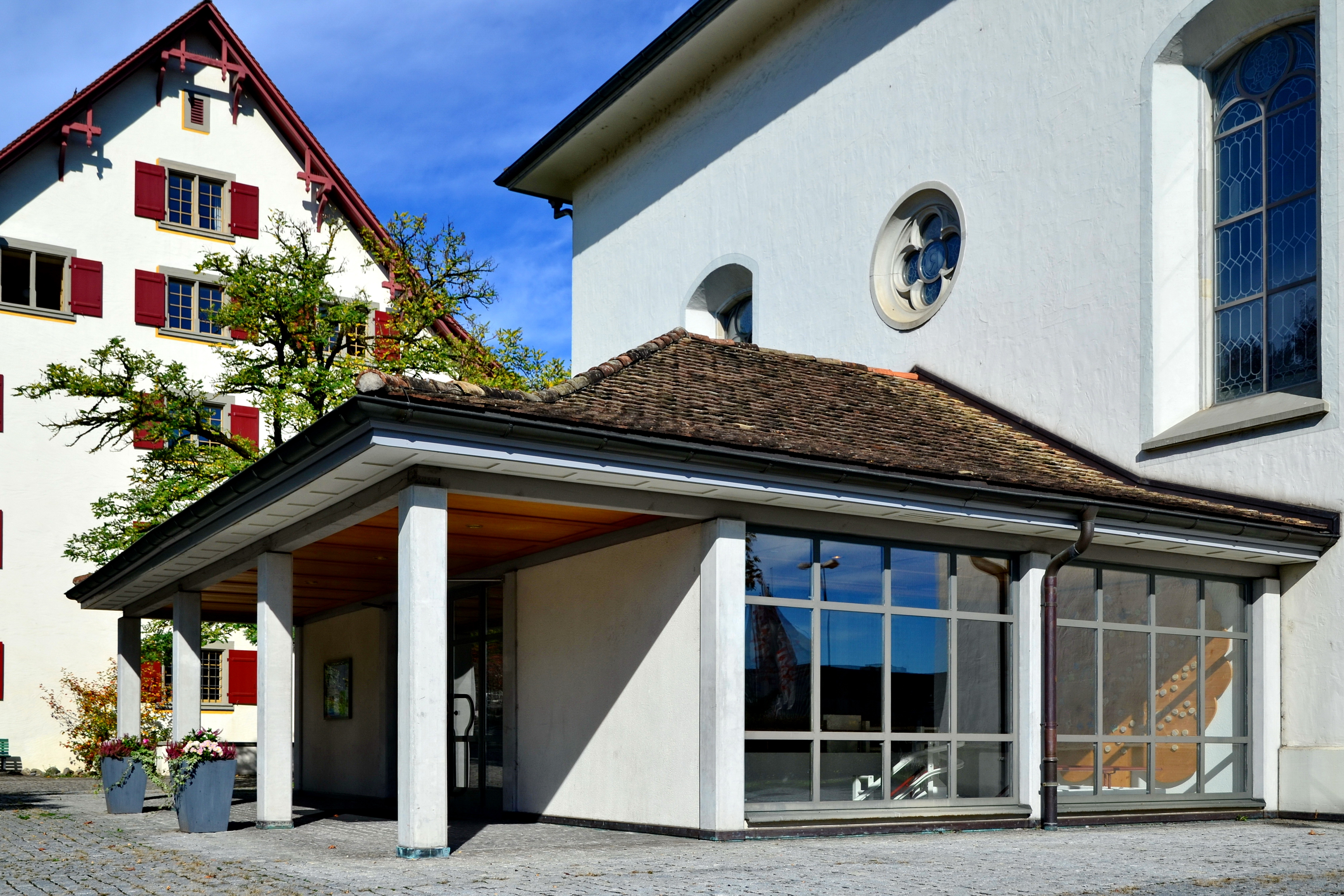
Entrance hall of 1982

In addition, the church is now wheelchair-accessible. Doors were added to the side chapels, and the preservation of monuments approved a western annex comprising a toilet facility and a community room. The windows, the floor heating and the church pews were also renewed. The external environment has also been redesigned, including the southern church garden (former cemetery) and a new courtyard, as a joint project of church and political community, designed between the Kantonspolizei Zürich police station respectively Amthaus and the church.

== Pipe organ ==
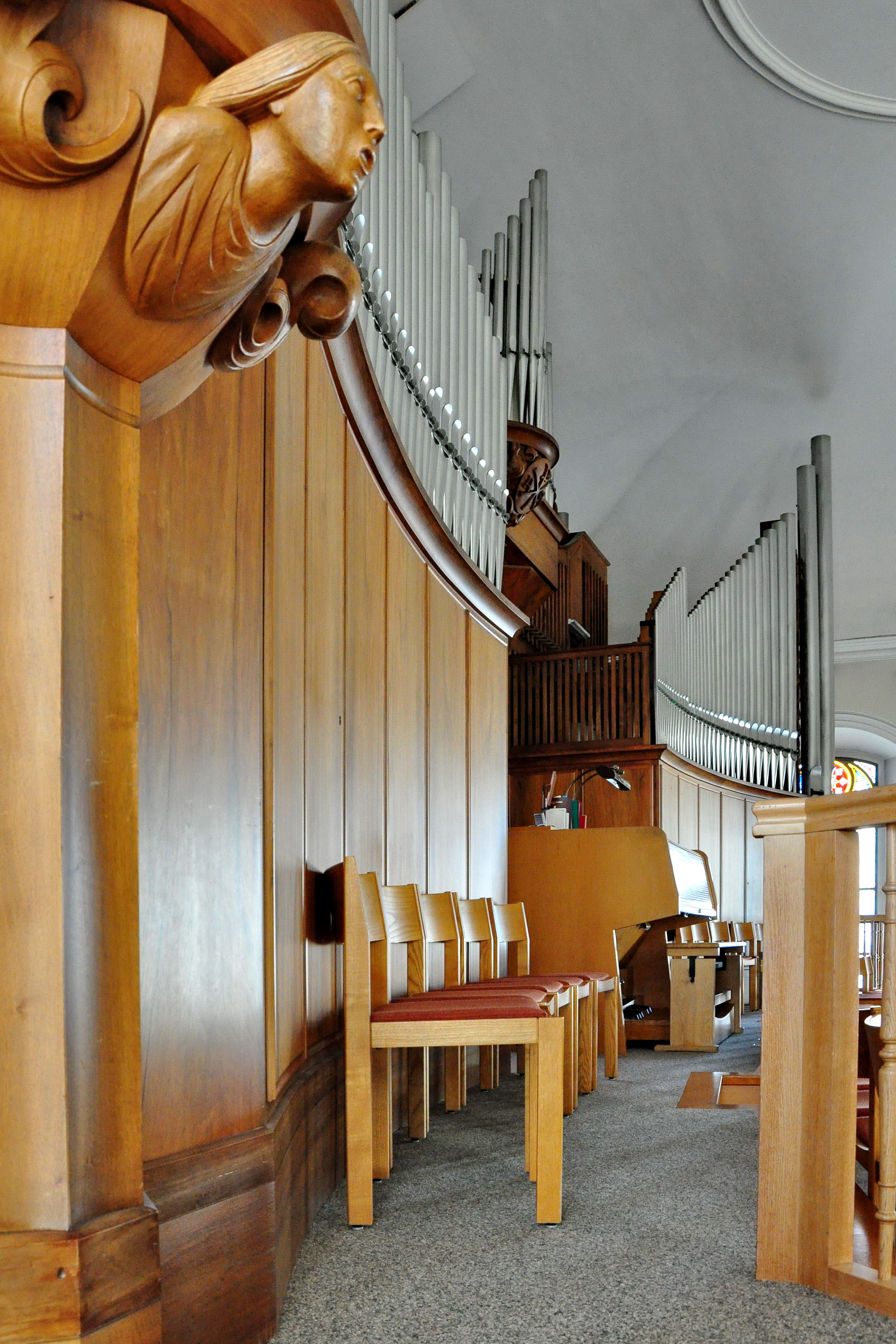

The pipe organ in the gallery was installed by Orgelbau Th. Kuhn AG in 1936.

I Hauptwerk C–g^{3}
Quintatön	16′
Principal	8′
Flauto major	8′
Gemshorn	8′
Octave	4′
Rohrflöte	4′
Rauschquinte 2f.
Mixtur 5-6f.

II Kronpositiv C–g^{3}
Quintagön	8′
Gedeckt	8′
Flöte	4′
Piffaro 2f.	4′ + 2′
Sesquialtera 2f.	2^{2}/_{3}′
Principal	2′
Superquinte 1)	1^{1}/_{3}′
Zimbel 4f.
Zimbel 3-4f.	1′
Krummhorn Tremulant	8′

III Schwellwerk C–g^{3}
Liebl. Gedeckt	16′
Ital. Principal	8′
Gedecktflöte	8′
Salicional	8′
Voix céleste	8′
Ottava variata	4′
Ital. Prinzipal	4′
Traversflöte 2)	4′
Gemshorn	4′
Quinte 3)	2^{2}/_{3}′
Piccolo 3)	2′
Larigot 1-2f. 3)
Plein jeu 6f.
Basson	16′
Trompete harm.	8′
Oboe	8′
Clairon	4′

Pedal C–f^{1}
Principalbass	16′
Subbass	16′
Echobass 4)	16′
Octavbass	8′
Spillflöte 5)	8′
Choralbass	4′
Mixturbass	5^{1}/_{3}′ + 2′
Bombarde	16′
Fagott	8′

1) Extract of Zimbel 4f.; 2) Transmissionregister with additional Bassoktave; 3) Extract of Plein jeu 6f.; 4) Transmission Gedeckt 16′ III. Manual; 5) Transmission Traversflöte 4′ III. Manual;

== History ==
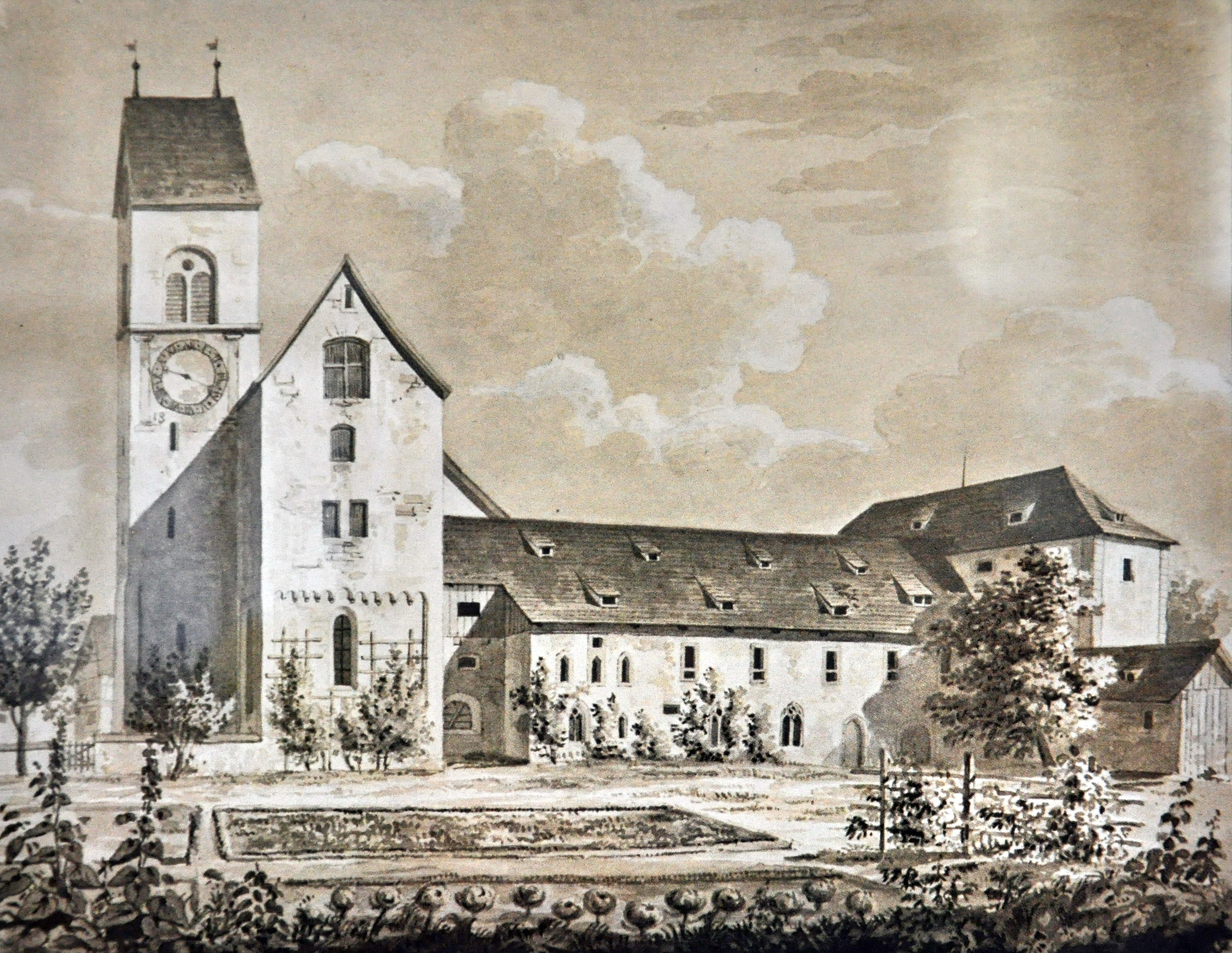
a drawing of the church and the remaining monastic buildings around 1840

In 1206 the estate for the abbey was given by Liutold IV, Count of Regensberg, and a small church in Unterbollingen on the upper Lake Zürich peninsula whose rights were transferred by Rudolf von Rapperswil and Diethelm von Toggenburg to the convent in 1229. Initially founded as a branch of the Premonstratensian Abbey in Churwalden, Rüti Abbey, commonly known as Saint Mary Abbey, was placed by the Bishop of Constance to the Weissenau (Minderau) abbey in 1230 and was part of the administrative district of Zirkaria Swabia. The consecration was originally celebrated on the Sunday after Conversio Sancti Pauli (25 January); in 1254 Bishop Eberhard von Regensberg moved fair to the Sunday after the day of remembrance of the Saints Philip and Jacob (1 Mai), but in 1298 the parish fair was again postponed on the day of Marcellus (16 January). In 1286, for financial reason, the Countess Elisabeth von Rapperswil had to sell her farm estate in Oberdürnten including the associated rights (in particular the lower courts) to the Rüti Abbey. But the House of Rapperswil also supported the Rüti abbey in the following decades, so Johann's I son, Johann II, assigned an estate and all rights in the name of his younger siblings on 17 June 1340. The convent was generously endowed with money and goods by the aristocratic families in northeastern Switzerland, enabling it to buy the rights to parish churches and a large number of additional estates. By gift, purchase and exchange, Rüti Abbey enlarged its ownership, which concentrated in the early 15th century in Rüti (Ferrach and Oberdürnten), between Greifensee and Pfäffikersee and on the northeastern shore on so-called Obersee lakes. Rüti was an important stage point along the Jakobsweg (Way of St. James) leading via Rapperswil and the wooden bridge at the Seedamm lake crossing to the Einsiedeln Abbey. In 1408 the Rüti village and the abbey came under the reign of the government of the city of Zürich as part of the so-called Herrschaft Grüningen. Among many other transfers of lands and goods, on 12 May 1433 Heini Murer von Grueningen and his wife Anna Keller confirmed the transfer of their lands on Lutzelnoew island, including numerous buildings and lands in the Herrschaft Grüningen. By order of the council of the city of Zürich, on occasion of the Reformation in Zürich, the monastery was abolished, and the so-called Amt Rüti established on 17 June 1525, to manage the extensive estates and income, and the monastery church went over to the state.

== Burials in the church ==
=== Counts of Toggenburg ===
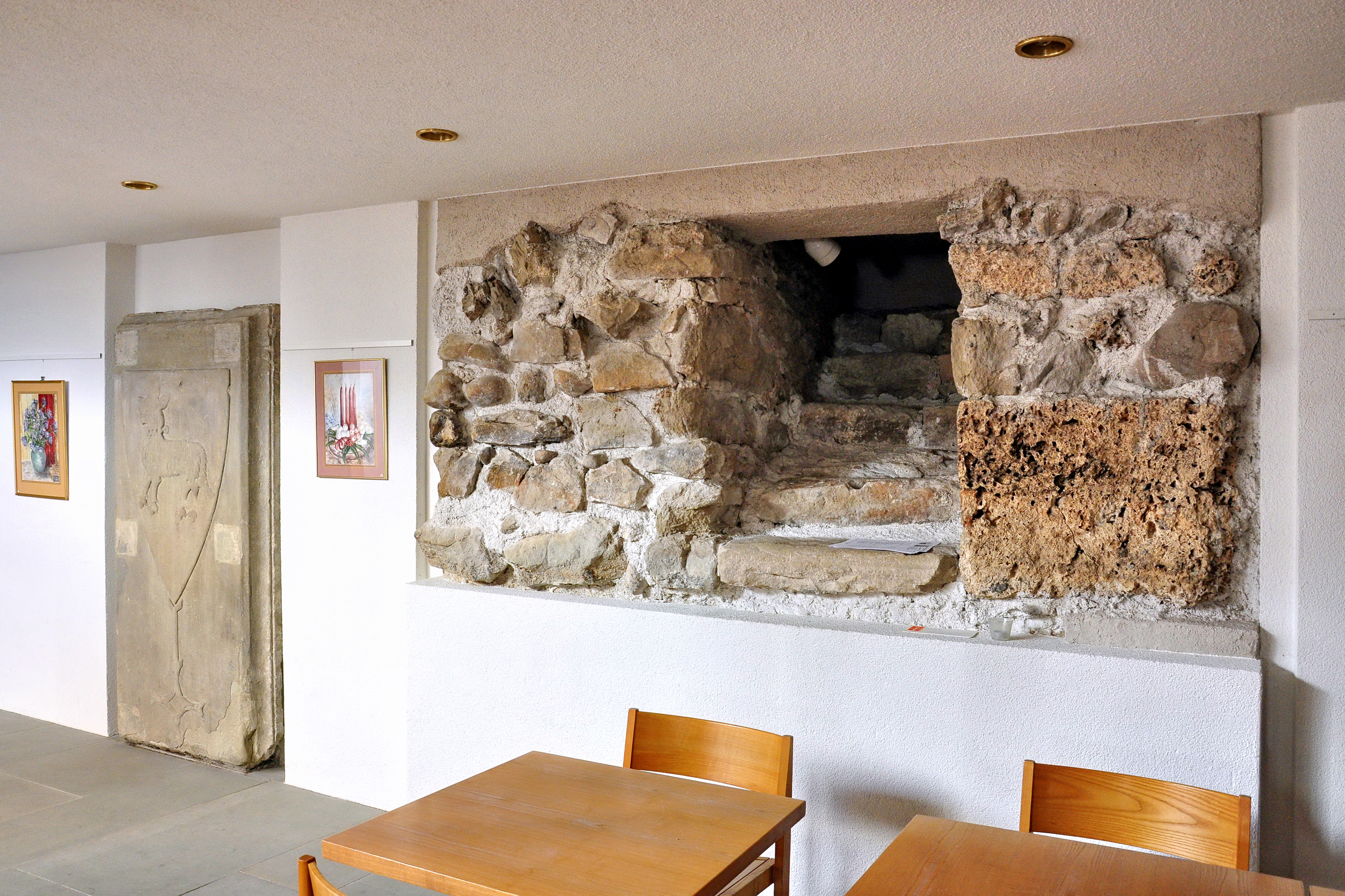
Toggenburg burial vault

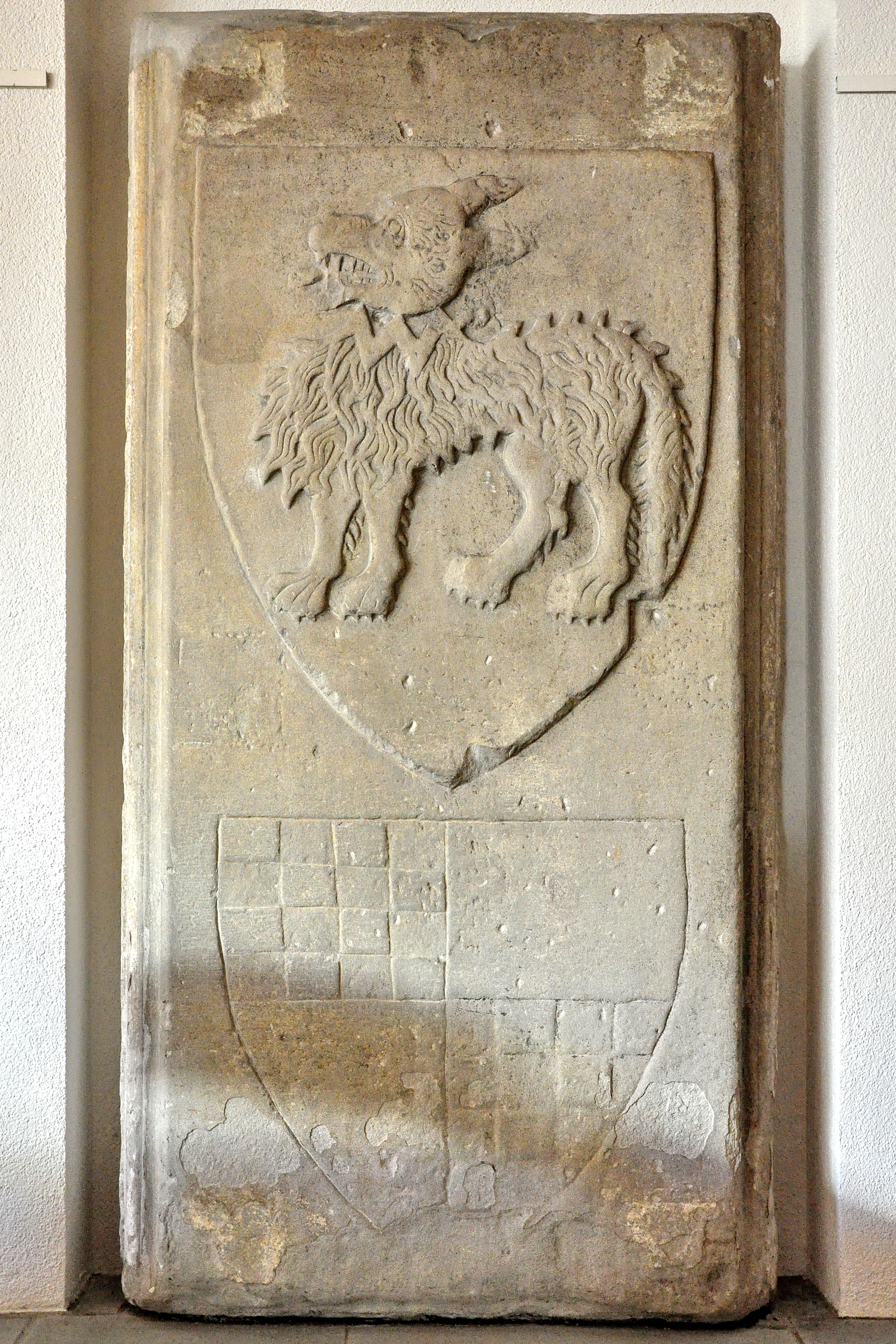
one of the few remaining tomb stones of the Toggenburg family, Toggenburgergruft beneath the present entrance area of the church

The members of the Toggenburg family were buried in the so-called Toggenburger Gruft, a burial vault where is as of today the entrance hall to the church.

On 23 April 1398 Count Donat von Toggenburg, Herr zu Brettengow und Tavas donated the church of Elsow as benefice for the new Allerheiligenaltar at the grave of the Toggenburg family, for the "salvation of his daughter soul Menta von Toggenburg" who died shortly before, as well as further lands and goods in the present Weinland district of the canton of Zürich, confirmed among others by Ruodolf von Bonstetten from Ustra on 23 April 1398.

Count Fridrich von Toggenburg, Herr zu Brettengow und Tafas donated to "his own and the salvation of his ancestors who were buried" (at the Rüti church) "and where he also expects to be buried", the church, rights and lands (Kirchwidem and Kirchensatz) in Wangen in der March to the Rüti Monastery, sealed by Fridrich and the knights Herman von Landenberg, Johans von Bonstetten from Ustra and Herman von der Hochenlandenberg on 21 January 1407. In 1436 Count Friedrich VII of Toggenburg died and was buried probably in 1439 in a chapel, the so-called Toggenburger Kapelle (capella nova in latere monasterii de novo construxit) given by his noble wife, Countess Elisabeth von Toggenburg, née von Mätsch.

Elisabeth Countess of Toggenburg spent her last days in the Rüti Abbey, and she was mentioned on 20 June 1442 that she was retreated there ("unser wesen gentzlich in dasselbe gotzhus got zuo dienende gezogen haben") and elected her tomb to be with her husband after her death.

On 11 June 1443 marauding troops of the Old Swiss Confederacy devastated the monastery and desecrated the bodies of the nobles, including Count Friedrich VII who they held responsible for the war with Zürich, and the scavengers pelted with the remains like schoolboys with snowballs.

=== Burials of other noble families ===
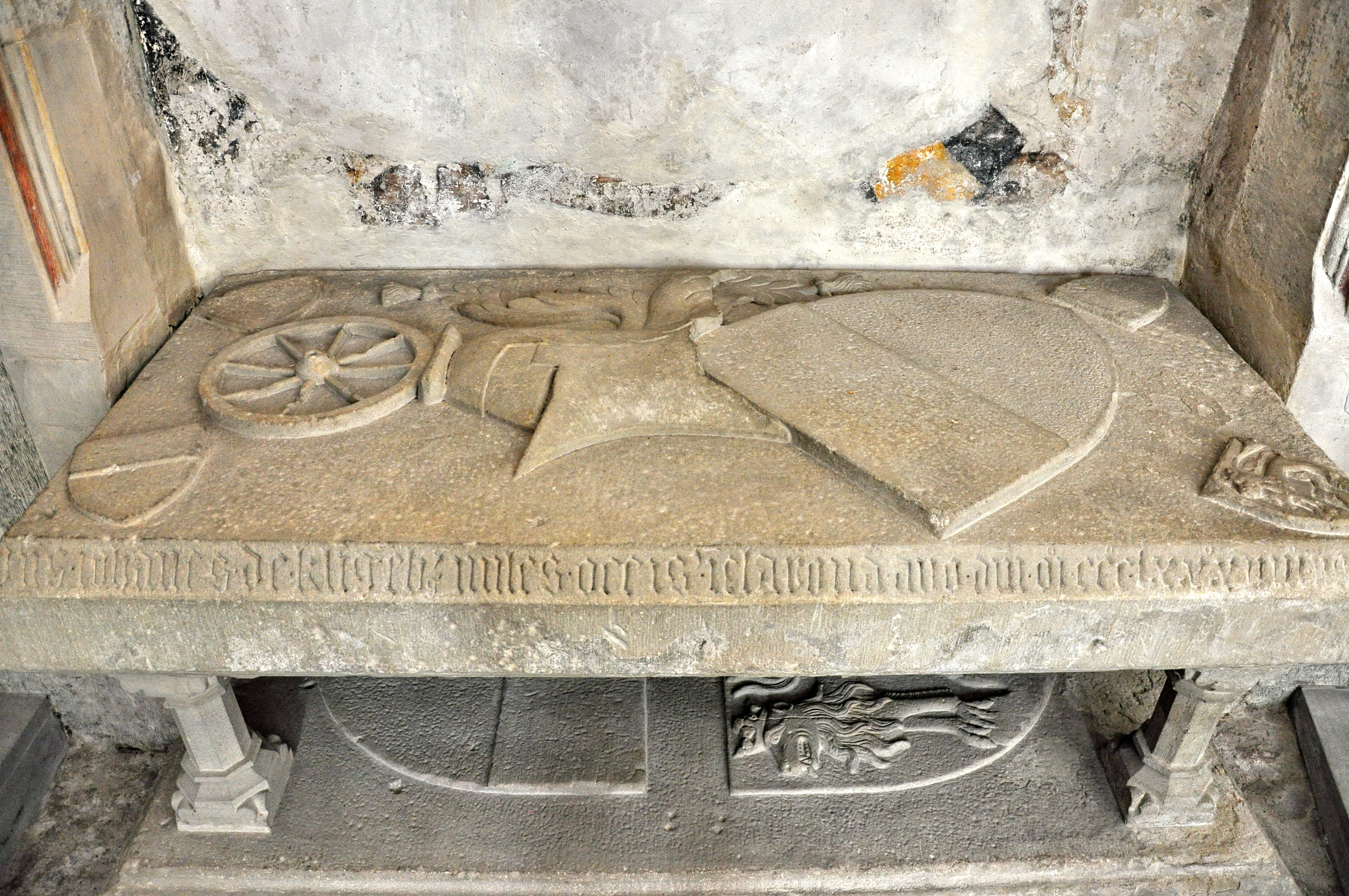
Ledger stone of knight Johann von Klingenberg

On 29 November 1389, seven months after the Battle of Näfels, the abbot Bilgeri von Wagenberg moved about 100 bodies respectively the bones of the Swiss-Austrian knights and soldiers, among them his brother Johann von Klingenberg, from the battle field. The Rüti abbey's abbot reburied their remains in a mass grave within the choir of the church, where they were discovered on occasion of the archaeological excavations in 1980.

In addition, there was a large number of members of noble families and knights living nearby, although there were never found burials of the founders of the abbey, the House of Regensberg. Most of the burials respectively ledger stones are lost or destroyed – particularly the ones of the Toggenburg family and those of the nobilities that were deconsecrated by the Old Swiss Confederacy troops in June 1443 – or were re-used for buildings etc.

The devastation and the plundering weakened the monastic manorial, and the desecration of the graves diminished the importance of the abbey as preferred burial place of the nobility. But, memoria for the noble families remain largely intact, even after the Reformation in Zürich until the demolition of the Toggenburgerkapelle vault when the church partially had to rebuild in 1770. Among other burials in the Rüti church, there are the families of the Amtsmann, the representatives of the government of the city of Zürich who resided in Rüti between 1525 and 1789.

== Cultural heritage of national importance ==
The Rüti church is listed in the Swiss inventory of cultural property of national and regional significance as a Class object of national importance.

== Literature ==
- Roger Sablonier: Adel im Wandel. Untersuchungen zur sozialen Situation des ostschweizerischen Adels um 1300. Chronos-Verlag, Zürich 1979/2000. ISBN 978-3-905313-55-0.
- Emil Wüst: Die Rütner Kirche mit ihren baulichen Veränderungen und ihre jeweiligen Sigristen und Organisten seit der Reformation. Reformierte Kirche Rüti 1984.
- Bernard Andenmatten and Brigitte Degler-Spengler: Die Prämonstratenser und Prämonstratenserinnen in der Schweiz. In: Helvetia Sacra IV/3, Basel 2002, ISBN 978-3-7965-1218-6.
- Peter Niederhäuser ad Raphael Sennhauser: Adelsgrablegen und Adelsmemoria im Kloster Rüti. In: Kunst + Architektur in der Schweiz, Volume 54, No. 1, 2003.
