= Cyre de Toggenburg =

Swiss visual artist (born 1972)

- Born: June 17, 1972 (age 53); Ernetschwill, Switzerland
- Known for: Painting
- Movement: Spiritual Abstract

Cyre de Toggenburg (born June 17, 1972) is a Swiss visual artist who specializes in abstract art.

== Biography ==
She was trained in an ultra-traditional practice that gave her an important technical base from 1988 to 1998. She studied Walt Disney colors during two years and then turned to old fashion painting.

Cyre belonged to the GAVART Gallery, a group of sculptors and painters, whose members include Zaven, Aléhaux, Beyssey, Bouchaud, de Kerhor, de Verdière, du Jeu, Kwak, Lalanne, among others. Graduating from the Conservatoire de Paris, Cyre pursued her studies of human sciences and psychoanalysis at the Institut de Psychanalyse Active, Paris.

Cyre has exhibited in many European countries, Russia, Africa, Oceania, Europe. Her experience of living and traveling in Africa between 2009 and 2010 influenced her work in the way of the spirituality. Then she lived in New Caledonia during the year 2013. She is actually working in France.

== Career ==
Her works, influenced by Rothko, are oriented towards abstraction. She named them all "No title" until 2011. She often uses the square format, a technique commonly used for photography.

While her work is stylistically similar to the Abstract Expressionists, she is also influenced by Romanticists. Cyre de Toggenburg herself has stated that she has been influenced by the works of Delacroix and Géricault, and others like Turner, LeRoy Neiman, El Greco, Nicolas de Staël and Klimt.

Cyre de Toggenburg's painting continues the path of Vasudeo S. Gaitonde towards Zen and Spiritualism and Gerhard Richter's towards abstraction. The artist seeks to touch the spirituality of the observer. Her research focused on abstract painting in the fields of literature, science, sociology, ethnology, philosophy, psychology, quantum physics, chemistry and Zen.

Her intellectual curiosity led her to exploit the progress of science and to transposed those mechanisms to pictorial abstraction. She is also inspired by different fields such as design. She has paint a "tribute to Ralph Lauren" in 2017.

Awards

- Medal of Excellence Painter, Today's Arts Talent 2016 (Editions of Museums and Culture EDMC)
- Trophy of Riviera Contemporary Art 2016, Abstract Art Category
- Trophy of Art and Style 2016, Honorary Artist of Fundamental Research
