= Elisabeth von Matsch =

Swiss noblewoman

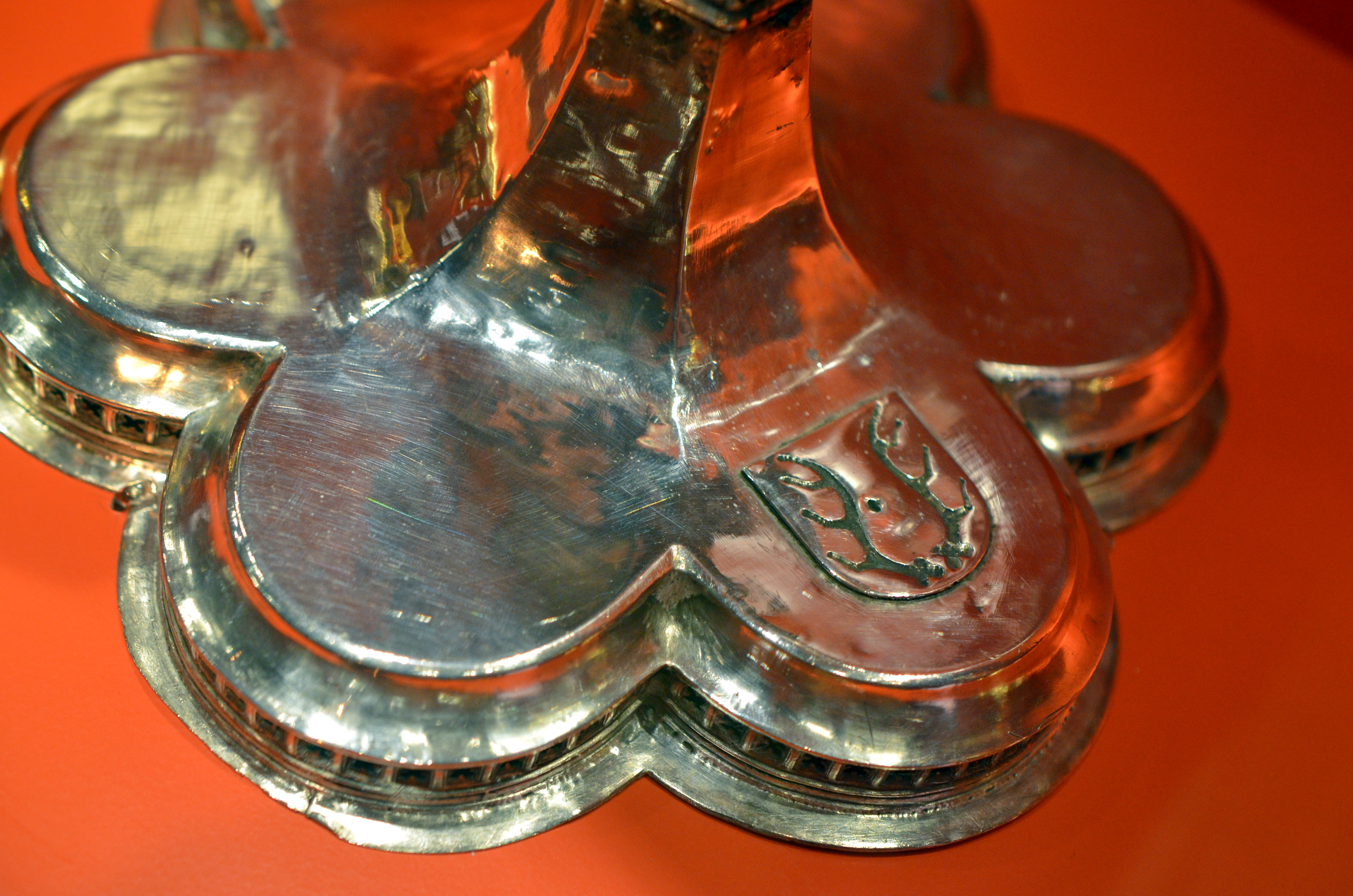
- Reliquiar by Elisabeth von Mätsch, Stadtmuseum Rapperswil
- Born: unknown, probably in the late 1370s
- Died: after 20 June 1442, presumably on 24 November 1446; Rüti Abbey
- Occupation: Countess of Grafschaft Toggenburg
- Years active: 1391–1442
- Known for: last Countess of the House of Toggenburg

Elisabeth von Matsch (also von Mätsch, Mazzo, von Toggenburg, date of birth unknown; died after 20 June 1442, presumably on 24 November 1446) was the last countess of the Swiss noble House of Toggenburg from 1436. She was the spouse of Friedrich VII, count of Toggenburg.

== Early life ==
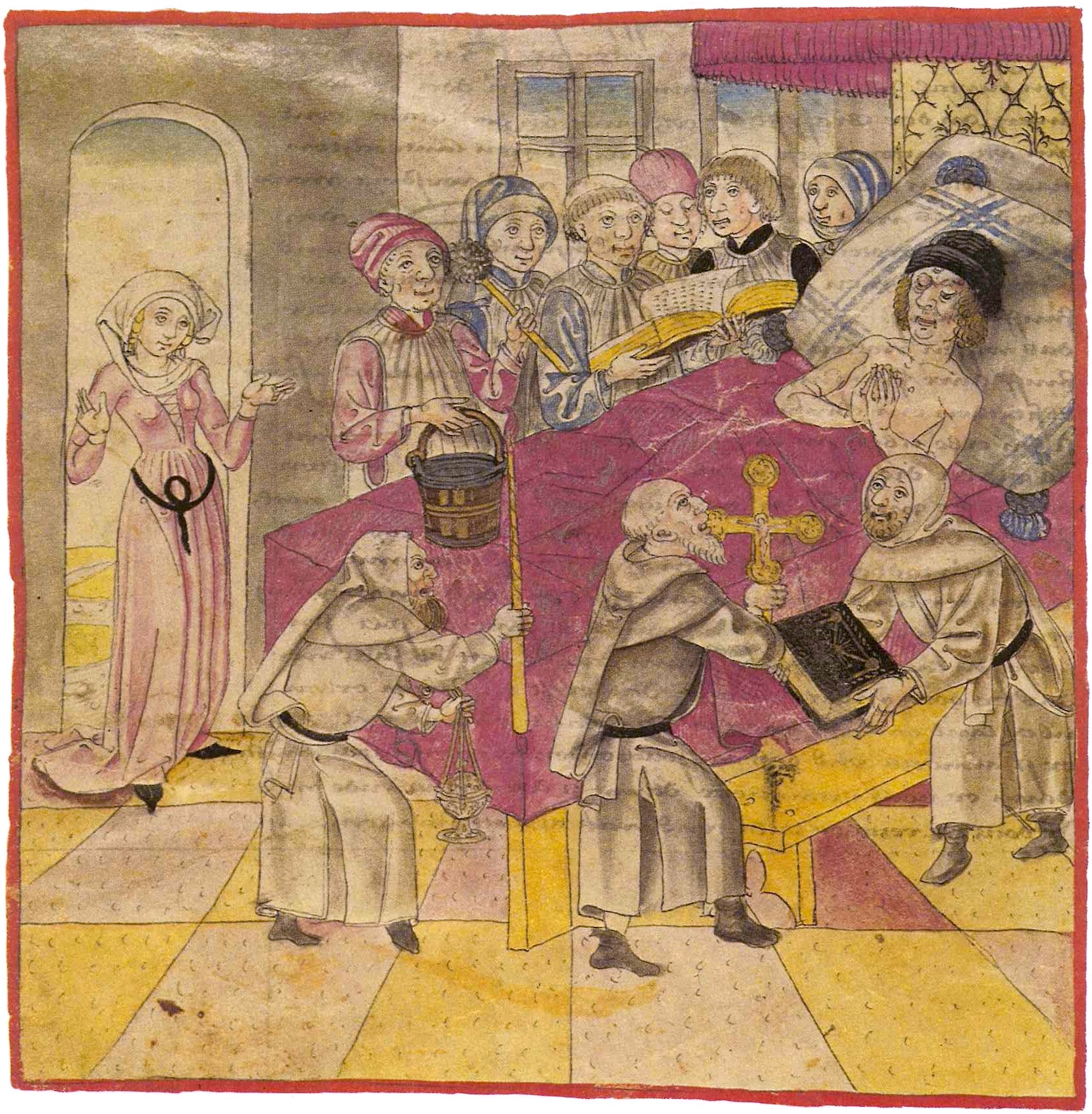
Death of Friedrich VII in his bed, the lady to the left may be Elisabeth. Amtliche Berner Chronik by Diebold Schilling, 1484.

Elisabeth was the daughter of Ulrich IV, Vogt of Matsch, Count of Kirchberg (1349–1402) and Landeshauptmann of Tirol (1361–1363), and Agnes Countess of Kirchberg († 1401). There are no sources about her early years, and her life as Countess of Toggenburg is sparsely documented. Intentionally to end the long year territorial disputes between the Matsch family and the House of Toggenburg as the Matsch family's opponent in the present Swiss cantons of Graubünden and St. Gallen, Elisabeth married Friedrich VII von Toggenburg in 1391.

The archives of the city republic of Zürich keeps a document, sealed by the city council and citizenry of Zürich on 7 September 1433, that Graf Fridrich von Toggenburg, Herr zu Utznach, zu Meygenfeld, im Brettengoew [Prättigau] und auf Dafaus [Davos] appointed his wife Gräfin Elssbeth von Toggenburg, geborene von Maetsch to his sole heiress, and that the Burgrecht was renewed and also included Countess Elisabeth, on occasion of a meeting with Zürich officials in Rapreswil. Elisabeth and Friedrich had no children, and the count died in 1436 being the last Count of Toggenburg. Friedrich VII was buried in the so-called Toggenburg chapel which was given by Countess Elisabeth to be built adjoint to the church of the Rüti Abbey.

== Last countess of Toggenburg ==
=== Exile in Zürich and sole heir of Toggenburg ===
When Friedrich VII died on 30 April 1436, Countess Elisabeth initially was hold as sole heir, but she searched protection – in the face of pledge claims by the Dukes of Habsburg-Austria together with magnificent claims of the King of the Holy Roman Empire and inheritance claims by local landlords, and by the Old Swiss Confiderancy – by claiming ius burgense (German: Burgrecht) of the city republic of Zürich; on 31 October 1436 the so-called Burgrecht was prolonged from five years to Elisabeth's lifetime. Elisabeth and Fridrich von Hewen, her uncle and legal advisor, also confirmed that Graf Fridrich von Toggenburg appointed Elisabeth to sole heiress.

Gräfin Elssbeth von Toggenburg, née von Maetsch, was mentioned as sole heir in two documents of the city council of Zürich, and she certified on 31 October 1436, in view of the diverse services by Zürich for Fridrich, and given the fact that a widow requires special protection, with help of her uncle and legal counsel, Fridrich von Hewen, that she gave over the towns Utznang, Schmerikon and Utznangerberg (a castle on the Uznach mountain at the former Tuggen lake) including all rights to the city of Zürich as property. The transfer was valid "zuo stund" (now), and the inhabitants of the territories had to swear to the people of Zürich until Hilariustag (13 January 1437); the Countess maintained all servitudes by lifetime. The document also secured the privileges and the tradition of the (Toggenburg) residents, notably with regard to the so-called third penny in inheritances and the so-called Kirchsatz; Zürich declared also not to impose any taxes. The commitment, Count Fridrich VII has concluded with Schwyz, related to the tower at Grinow also should be complyed by Elisabeth. Countess Elisabeth and Baron Fridrich von Hewen seal as her legal counsel on 31 October 1436.

=== Toggenburg lands and rights ===
To secure the rights and lands of the County of Toggenburg, Countess Elisabeth also supported the so-called Zehngerichtenbund (literally: League of the ten jurisdictions) which included the then Toggenburg properties, the valleys of Prättigau, upper Albula-Belfort, Churwalden, Schanfigg and Maienfeld – the communities would either be split among other nobles, or the entire County of Toggenburg would be inherited by the House of Habsburg. On 8 June 1436 the former Toggenburg lands formed a pact which was supported by Elisabeth. On 16 February 1437 Elisabeth von Matsch granted the mayor and council of the city of Zurich or their representatives the authority to act on their behalf at the conciliation proceedings which were held immediately after the usurpations of Utznang and Schmerikon, Utznangerberg, Liechtensteig, Turtall and Neckertall by the cantons of Schwyz and Glarus, as well to lock Grynow, and to secure the recording of the land law in favour of the Toggenburg residents. The contract was signed by Elisabeth, and at her request, sealed by her nephew Vogt Uolrich von Mätsch, Graf zu Kirchberg, on 23 February 1437.

== Rüti Abbey ==
=== Toggenburg chapel ===
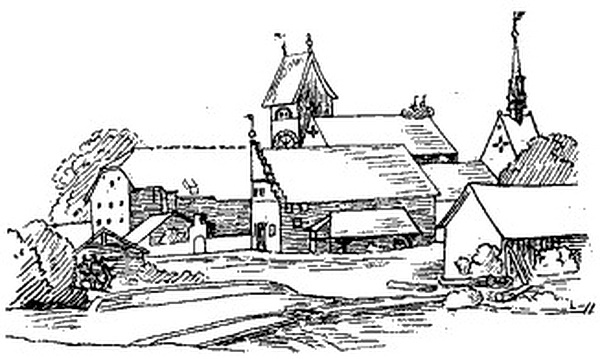
The Toggenburg chapel respectively the Rüti Church on a 1650s drawing by Konrad Meyer

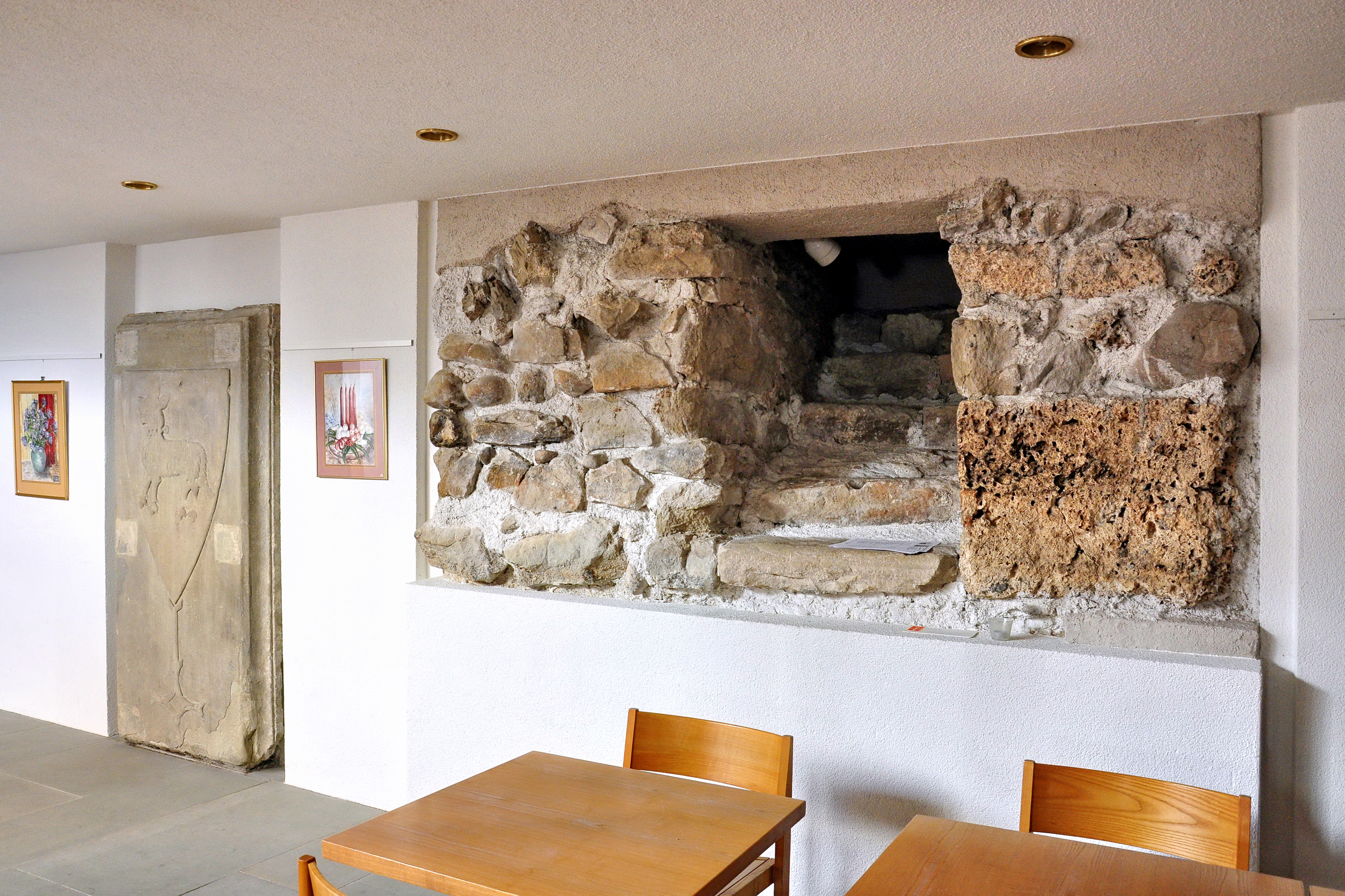
Remains of the Toggenburg crypt in the present church of the former Rüti Abbey

On 5 September 1439 Elisabeth von Mätsch instigated a parsonage for the purpose of a daily Mass to Friedrich's and her own salvation, and for this purpose she bequeathed the amount of 1,300 Rheinische Gulden in gold and precious gems with ornaments (pretiosa ornamenta) to the Rüti Abbey. In the abbey 14 members of the Toggenburg family were buried in the so-called Toggenburggruft, a burial vault, and Countess Elisabeth and Friedrich VII lived there before 1436, and probably Elisabeth in the late years of her exile. During her lifetime, Countess Elisabeth chose the priest who should hold the Mass in the new chapel (capella nova in latere monasterii de novo construxit) of the monastery church. After her death, the foundation provided that the abbot and his convent hold a daily Mass and the usual periodicals, and that to the priest in charge was given board and lodge, as well as ten Rheinische Gulden at Christmas, financed by Elisabeth's foundation. The abbot of Einsiedeln had to pay attention to the fulfillment of these obligations and received in this way influence on the life of the Rüti Abbey respectively the convent had the hermit pin to pay fifty Florins for non-compliance.

=== Late years, last will and burial ===
Elisabeth Countess of Toggenburg spent her last days in the Rüti Abbey, and she was mentioned on 20 June 1442 as inhabitant of the Rüti Abbey: Elisabeth von Toggemburg...Graf Ffriedrich von Toggenburg and many of his ancestors haven chosen to be buried in the Rüti Abbey, which is why she has retreated there ("unser wesen gentzlich in dasselbe gotzhus got zuo dienende gezogen haben") and elected her tomb to be with her husband after her death, attested that she had given to the monastery....in honor of God...a specifically named jewel, namely 1300 Rheinische Gulden for an eternal daily fair and for several seasons...[as per 5 September 1439]..., also a beaded ("berlachtes") chasuble, a gilded "tryenvass", the big monstrance with the mandrel the crown of Christ, the small monstrance with an attached closure ("Schlössli") heart-shaped, four chasubles made of velvet and damask, two silk decorative ceiling ("Golter") in green and red, and a silk tapestry ("uffschlag")... The document is sealed by Countess Elisabeth and knight Albrecht von Landemberg von Breitenlandemberg (Tösstal). On 11 June 1443 marauding troops of the Old Swiss Confederacy devastated the monastery and desecrated the bodies of the nobles – namely with Count Thierstein's bones the scavengers pelted like schoolboys with snowballs, and they desecrated the grave of Count Friedrich VII which they held responsible for the war with Zürich.

Probably for the last time, Ellsbetha, gräffin zu Togckenburg was mentioned in a document on 24 November 1446, sealed by Countess Elisabeth and certified by Schultheiss und Rat der Stadt Rapperswil: Elisabeth granted a benefice (Pfründe) in the amount of 800 Rheinische Gulden to the Stadtpfarrkirche Rapperswil.

== Aftermath ==
While Count Friedrich VII did have at least one illegitimate son, Johannes, he died on 30 April 1436 and was buried at Rüti Abbey. The lords of Raron, Montfort-Tettnang, Sax-Misox, Brandis and Aarburg, they all had claims on the Toggenburg lands. When the city republic of Zürich, having documents sealed by Friedrich and Elisabeth von Toggenburg, also claimed the Toggenburg bailiwick, and the canton of Schwyz supported by Glarus also claimed lands and conquered the Toggenburg heartland, the Old Zürich War broke out.

== See also ==
- Toggenburg-Chronik

== Literature ==
- Erwin Eugster: Adlige Territorialpolitik in der Ostschweiz. Kirchliche Stiftungen im Spannungsfeld früher landesherrlicher Verdrängungspolitik. Zürich 1991, ISBN 3-90527-868-5.
- Roger Sablonier: Gründungszeit ohne Eidgenossen: Politik und Gesellschaft in der Innerschweiz um 1300. hier + jetzt, Baden 2008, ISBN 978-3-03919-085-0.
- Christiane Benedikte Naubert, Sylvia Kolbe: Elisabeth, Erbin von Toggenburg. Oder Geschichte der Frauen von Sargans in der Schweiz. In einer Transkription von Sylvia Kolbe. Engelsdorfer Verlag. Leipzig 2015, ISBN 978-3-95744-561-2.
