= Counts of Toggenburg =

Noble family

County of Toggenburg Grafschaft Toggenburg
- 1209–1436
- coat of arms (until 1308) coat of arms (from 1228)

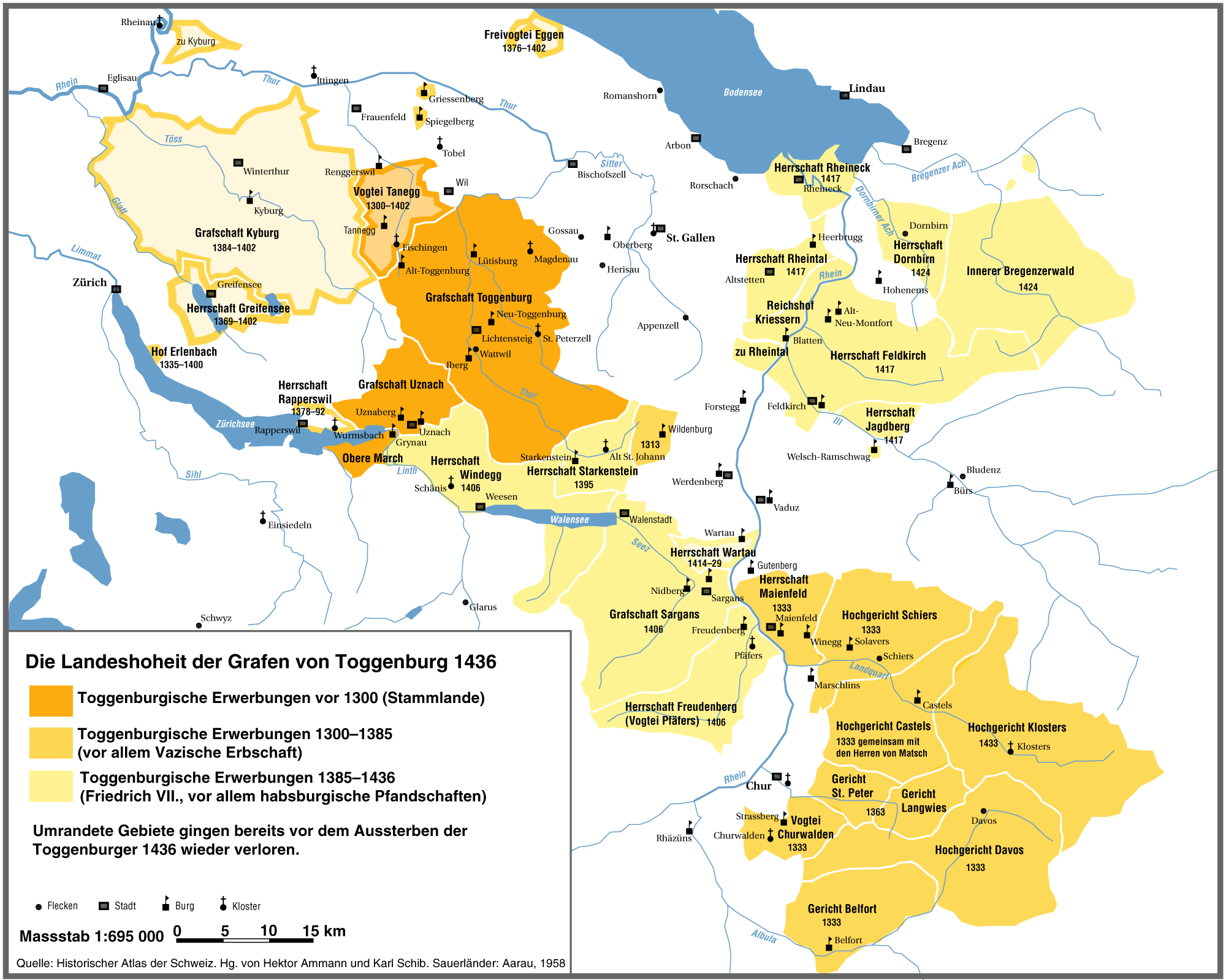
- Territories held by the counts of Toggenburg
- Status: County
- Capital: Lichtensteig
- Historical era: Middle Ages
  - first mention: 1209
  - Partitioned: 1394
  - Comital line extinct: 1436
  - Sold to the Abbot of St Gall: 1468
Preceded by
House of Kyburg
Succeeded by
Abbey of St. Gall
League of Ten Jurisdictions
Zürich
County of Sargans

The counts of Toggenburg (Grafen von Toggenburg) ruled the Toggenburg region of today's canton of St. Gallen, Switzerland, and adjacent areas during the 13th to 15th centuries.

A baronial family of Toggenburg is mentioned in the 11th and 12th centuries, but their genealogical connection to the comital family is unclear. They are named for their ancestral seat, now known as Alt-Toggenburg, near Kirchberg, St. Gallen. The castle was built in the 10th or 11th century, and was destroyed in 1085 in a conflict with the Abbot of St. Gallen, later rebuilt and in 1226 given to St. Gallen Abbey by count Diethelm of Toggenburg.

The family is attested from the early 13th century, as Toccanburg, later Tochimburc. Diethelm I (possible mention 1176, died 1205 or 1207) was followed by Diethelm II (possible mention 1210, died c. 1230). Either of these was the beneficiary of the inheritance of a number of local noble families (among these Alt-Rapperswil) in c. 1200 and adopted the title of comes (count) from 1209. In 1187, one Werner of Toggenburg became abbot of Einsiedeln. The legend of a Saint Ida of Toggenburg is recorded in 1481, making her the wife of a count of Toggenburg, possibly either Diethelm, or one Heinrich. According to the legend, the husband defenestrated his innocent wife on suspicion of adultery. She survived and lived as an anchoress in Fischingen. Her veneration there is attested for 1410.

The early counts were in competition with St. Gallen Abbey, the bishops of Constance and the counts of Kyburg. The inheritance disputes motivated the donation of religious establishments in Bubikon, Rüti, Oberbollingen and Wurmsbach in the 1190s, and a fratricide by one Diethelm (fl. 1209–36) of his brother Rudolf in 1226.

On 23 April 1398 Count Donat von Toggenburg donated the church of Elsow as benefice for the new Allerheiligenaltar at the grave of the Toggenburg family, for the "salvation of the soul of his daughter Menta von Toggenburg" who had died shortly before. Count Fridrich von Toggenburg, Herr zu Brettengow und Tafas donated to "his own and the salvation of his ancestors who were buried" (at the Rüti church) "and where he also expects to be buried," the church, rights and lands (Kirchwidem and Kirchensatz) in Wangen in der March to the Rüti Abbey, sealed by Fridrich and the knights Herman von Landenberg, Johans von Bonstetten from Ustra and Herman von der Hochenlandenberg on 21 January 1407.

In 1436, the death of the last count, Frederick VII, Count of Toggenburg, led to the Old Zurich War over the succession. Friedrich VII was later buried in a chapel, the so-called Toggenburger Kapelle (capella nova in latere monasterii de novo construxit) given by his noble wife, Elisabeth Countess of Toggenburg, née von Mätsch. Elisabeth spent her last days in the Rüti Abbey, writing on 20 June 1442 that she had retreated there (unser wesen gentzlich in dasselbe gotzhus got zuo dienende gezogen habe) and desired her tomb to be with her husband's. On 11 June 1443 marauding troops of the Old Swiss Confederacy devastated the monastery and desecrated the bodies of the nobles, including Count Friedrich VII whom they held responsible for the war with Zürich. 14 members of the family were buried in the Toggenburg vault in the church of the Rüti Abbey.

== List of counts ==
=== House of Toggenburg ===
Ruler	Born	Reign	Ruling part	Consort	Death	Notes
Diethelm I	?	fl.1044	Lordship of Toggenburg	Unknown at least two children	?	First documented lord of Toggenburg, probably the founder of the family.
Berthold	? Son of Diethelm I	fl.1044	Lordship of Toggenburg	Unknown	?	Probably brothers, confirm the same document as their father. It's not known if he succeeded him, or if the succession went through his brother Ulrich.
Ulrich	? Son of Diethelm I	fl.1044	Lordship of Toggenburg	Unknown	?	Probably brothers, confirm the same document as their father. It's not known if he succeeded him, or if the succession went through his brother Ulrich.
Fulknand	? Son of Ulrich or Fulknand	? – 1081	Lordship of Toggenburg	Unknown	1081	Probably brothers, it's not known which one succeeded the previous count. It's probable, however, that these belonged to the next generation. There's also an unnamed Toggenburg belonging to Fulknand and Diethelm II's generation, who married a woman named Irmgard (died in January of known year).
Diethelm II	? Son of Ulrich or Fulknand	1081 – 1102?	Lordship of Toggenburg	Unknown	After 14 July 1102	Probably brothers, it's not known which one succeeded the previous count. It's probable, however, that these belonged to the next generation. There's also an unnamed Toggenburg belonging to Fulknand and Diethelm II's generation, who married a woman named Irmgard (died in January of known year).
Diethelm III	? Son of Diethelm II	c.1102 – c.1146	Lordship of Toggenburg	Unknown	c.1146	Has a known sister, Kunigunde, who married a nobleman from the Stühlingen family.
Diethelm IV	? Son of Diethelm III	c.1146 – 1176?	Lordship of Toggenburg	Ita of Thierstein (Saint Ida of Toggenburg?) (d. 19 August 1200/1226?) one child	c.1176	
Diethelm V	c.1140 Son of Diethelm IV (and Ita?)	c.1176 – 1207	Lordship of Toggenburg	Ita? (of Kirchberg?) (Saint Ida of Toggenburg?) one/two children	4 January 1205 or 5 January 1207 aged ar. 64–67	Gave an important donation to Ritterhaus Bubikon c.1192. He was buried there and is also represented there in a fresco with his family.
Diethelm I the Elder	c.1160 First son of Diethelm V (and Ita of Kirchberg?)	c. 1207–1209	Lordship of Toggenburg	Guta of Rapperswil (Saint Ida of Toggenburg?) (1170-24 November 1227 or after 1227) before or c. 1209 three children	1230 aged ar. 69–70	Probably ruled jointly. Diethelm was numbered VI as lord. In 1209 the brothers were raised to counts. After Frederick's assassination, Diethelm rule alone.
Diethelm I the Elder	c.1160 First son of Diethelm V (and Ita of Kirchberg?)	1209–1230	County of Toggenburg	Guta of Rapperswil (Saint Ida of Toggenburg?) (1170-24 November 1227 or after 1227) before or c. 1209 three children	1230 aged ar. 69–70	Probably ruled jointly. Diethelm was numbered VI as lord. In 1209 the brothers were raised to counts. After Frederick's assassination, Diethelm rule alone.
Frederick I	c.1160 Second son of Diethelm V (and Ita?)	c. 1207–1209	Lordship of Toggenburg	Unmarried	c.1217 aged ar. 53–54	Probably ruled jointly. Diethelm was numbered VI as lord. In 1209 the brothers were raised to counts. After Frederick's assassination, Diethelm rule alone.
Frederick I	c.1160 Second son of Diethelm V (and Ita?)	1209–1217	County of Toggenburg	Unmarried	c.1217 aged ar. 53–54	Probably ruled jointly. Diethelm was numbered VI as lord. In 1209 the brothers were raised to counts. After Frederick's assassination, Diethelm rule alone.
Diethelm II the Younger	1209; Son of Diethelm I and Guta of Rapperswil	1230 – 25 January 1235	County of Toggenburg	Gertrude of Neuchâtel c.1220 or January 1221 nine children	25 January 1235 aged 25–26	
Frederick II	c.1220 Son of Diethelm II and Gertrude of Neuchâtel	25 January 1235 – 28 April 1284	County of Toggenburg	Unmarried	28 April 1284 aged ar. 63–64	Frederick, Diethelm and Kraft ruled jointly as sons of Diethelm II. After Kraft's death, he was replaced in the co-rulership with the former's two eldest sons, Diethelm and Kraft II.
Kraft I the Minstrel	1228; Son of Diethelm II and Gertrude of Neuchâtel	25 January 1235 – 15 July 1249/54	County of Toggenburg	Elisabeth of Bussnang (d. after 13 January 1277) three children	15 July 1249 or 1254 aged ar. 21–26	Frederick, Diethelm and Kraft ruled jointly as sons of Diethelm II. After Kraft's death, he was replaced in the co-rulership with the former's two eldest sons, Diethelm and Kraft II.
Diethelm III	c.1220 Son of Diethelm II and Gertrude of Neuchâtel	25 January 1235 – 4 September 1248	County of Toggenburg	Elisabeth c.1247 (before October) no children	4 September 1248 aged ar. 27–28	Frederick, Diethelm and Kraft ruled jointly as sons of Diethelm II. After Kraft's death, he was replaced in the co-rulership with the former's two eldest sons, Diethelm and Kraft II.
Diethelm IV	c.1240? Son of Kraft I and Elisabeth of Bussnang	1249 – 1282/3	County of Toggenburg	Unmarried	After 23 April 1282 or 1283 aged ar. 41–42	Frederick, Diethelm and Kraft ruled jointly as sons of Diethelm II. After Kraft's death, he was replaced in the co-rulership with the former's two eldest sons, Diethelm and Kraft II.
Kraft II	c.1240? Son of Kraft I and Elisabeth of Bussnang	1249 – 1261	County of Toggenburg	Unmarried	1261 aged ar. 20–21	Frederick, Diethelm and Kraft ruled jointly as sons of Diethelm II. After Kraft's death, he was replaced in the co-rulership with the former's two eldest sons, Diethelm and Kraft II.
Frederick III	1244? Son of Kraft I and Elisabeth of Bussnang	28 April 1284 – 1305/9	County of Toggenburg	Clementia of Werdenberg (1246-28 February 1282) five children	7 December 1305 or 17 January 1309 aged ar. 59–65	
Kraft III	c.1280? Son of Frederick III and Clementia of Werdenberg	1305/9 – 7 March 1339	County of Toggenburg	Unmarried	7 March 1339 aged ar. 58–59	Children of Frederick III, ruled jointly.
Frederick IV the Younger	c.1280 Son of Frederick III and Clementia of Werdenberg	1305/9 – 15 November 1315	County of Toggenburg	Ida of Frohburg-Homberg (d.19 March 1316/28) five children	15 November 1315; Morgarten aged ar. 34–35	Children of Frederick III, ruled jointly.
Diethelm V	c. 1300? Son of Frederick IV and Ida of Frohburg-Homberg	15 November 1315 – 21 September 1337	County of Toggenburg	Adelaide of Griesenberg (d.1371) two children	21 September 1337; Grinau aged ar. 36–37	Children of Frederick IV, ruled jointly and with their uncle Kraft III until the latter's death in 1339
Frederick V	c.1300? Son of Frederick IV and Ida of Frohburg-Homberg	15 November 1315 – 5 February 1364	County of Toggenburg	Kunigunde of Vaz (1308 - February 1364); 23 April 1337 ten children	5 February 1364 aged ar. 63–64	Children of Frederick IV, ruled jointly and with their uncle Kraft III until the latter's death in 1339
Frederick VI	1349; First son of Frederick V and Kunigunde of Vaz	5 February 1364 – January/May 1375	County of Toggenburg	Unmarried	22 January/28 May 1375 aged 25–26	Sons of Frederick V, ruled jointly.
Diethelm VI	1353; Second son of Frederick V and Kunigunde of Vaz	5 February 1364 – 27 December 1385	County of Toggenburg	Katharina of Werdenberg-Heiligenberg (1355-30 June 1395) three children	27 December 1385 aged 31–32	Sons of Frederick V, ruled jointly.
Donat	1358; Third son of Frederick V and Kunigunde of Vaz	5 February 1364 – 7 November 1400	County of Toggenburg	Agnes of Habsburg-Laufenburg (1387-1425) two children	7 November 1400 aged 41–42	Sons of Frederick V, ruled jointly.
Frederick VII	c. 1380; Son of Diethelm VI and Katharina of Werdenberg-Heiligenberg	7 November 1400 – 30 April 1436	County of Toggenburg	c.1410/30 three children	30 April 1436; Feldkirch aged 55–56	After his death, and with no surviving children, he left his wife as his heir.
Elisabeth of Mätsch	c.1370 Daughter of Ulrich IV, Lord of Mätsch and Agnes of Kirchberg	30 April 1436 – 24 November 1446	County of Toggenburg	c.1410/30 three children	24 November 1446 aged 75–76	Widow and heiress of Frederick VII.
