= Rüti Monastery =

Former Swiss Premonstratensian monastery

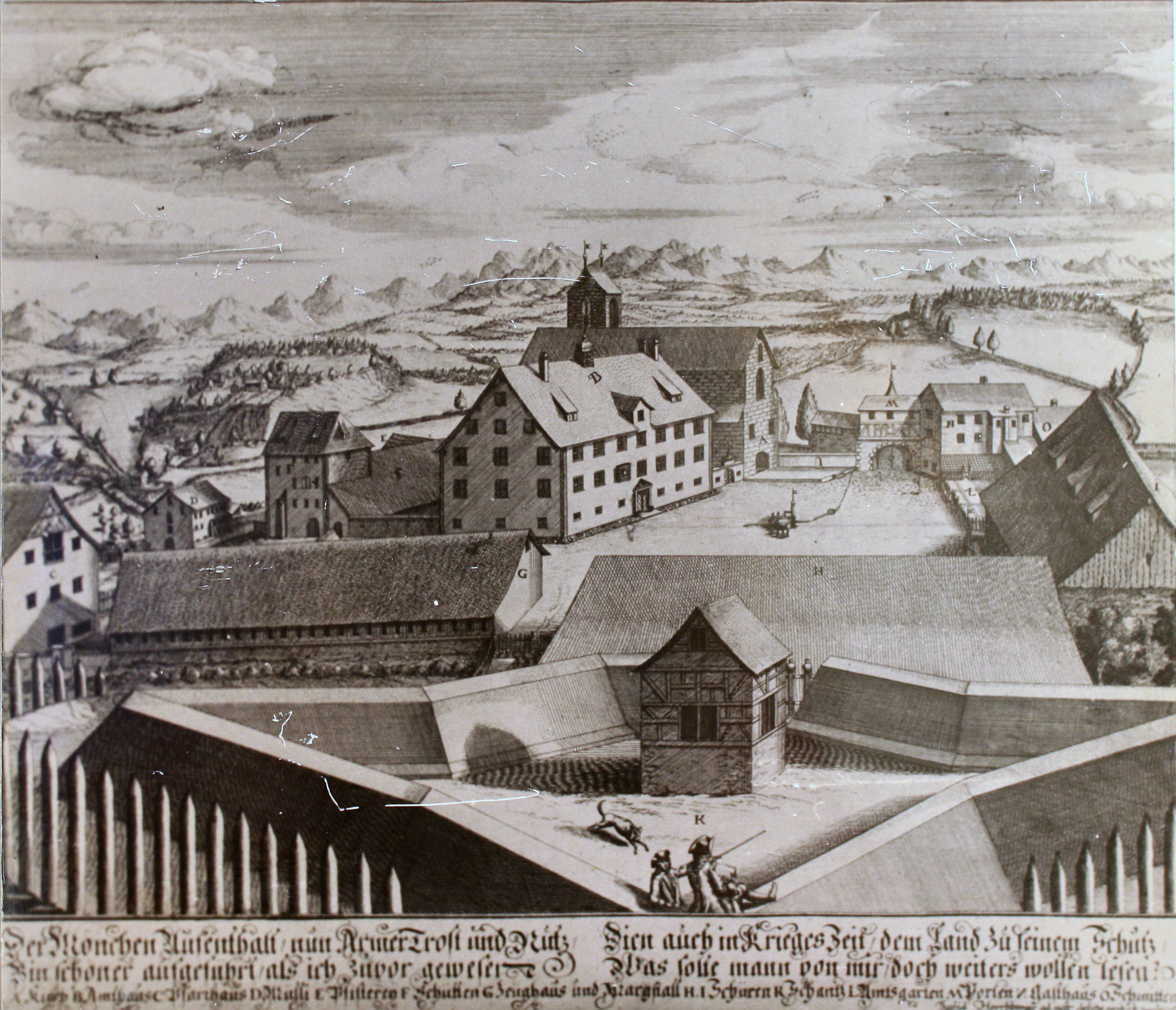
- Rüti Monastery respectively the so-called Amt Rüti around 1740, as seen from the Schanz bulwark, the present Rüti Reformed Church is situated in the background.

- Location within Canton of Zürich Location within Switzerland

Monastery information
- Other names: Kloster Rüti; Prämonstratenserkloster Rüti; Kloster zu unserer lieben Frau; Kloster sancte Maria
- Order: Premonstratensian
- Established: 1206
- Disestablished: 1525 during the Reformation in Zürich
- Mother house: Weissenau Abbey
- Diocese: Schwaben
- Controlled churches: Rüti (1206–1525), Uster (1438–1525), and further 12 parish churches

People
- Founder: Liutold IV von Regensberg
- Abbot: list of Abbots 1206–1525

Architecture
- Status: dissolved
- Functional status: Reformed church of the municipality of Rüti; municipal use as library, archives and so on (Amthaus); apartment buildings (Spitzerliegenschaft and former rectory)
- Heritage designation: Swiss Inventory of Cultural Property of National and Regional Significance

Site
- Location: Rüti, Canton of Zürich
- Coordinates: 47.2595°N 8.8490°E
- Visible remains: church and three buildings
- Public access: yes

Rüti Monastery (German: Prämonstratenserkloster Rüti) was a former Premonstratensian monastery, founded in 1206 and suppressed in 1525 on occasion of the Reformation in Zürich, situated in the municipality of Rüti in the canton of Zürich, Switzerland. The monastery's church was the final resting place of the Counts of Toggenburg, among them Count Friedrich VII and 13 other members of the Toggenburg family, and other noble families. Between 1206 and 1525, the monastery comprised 14 incorporated churches and the owner of extensive lands and estates at 185 localities.

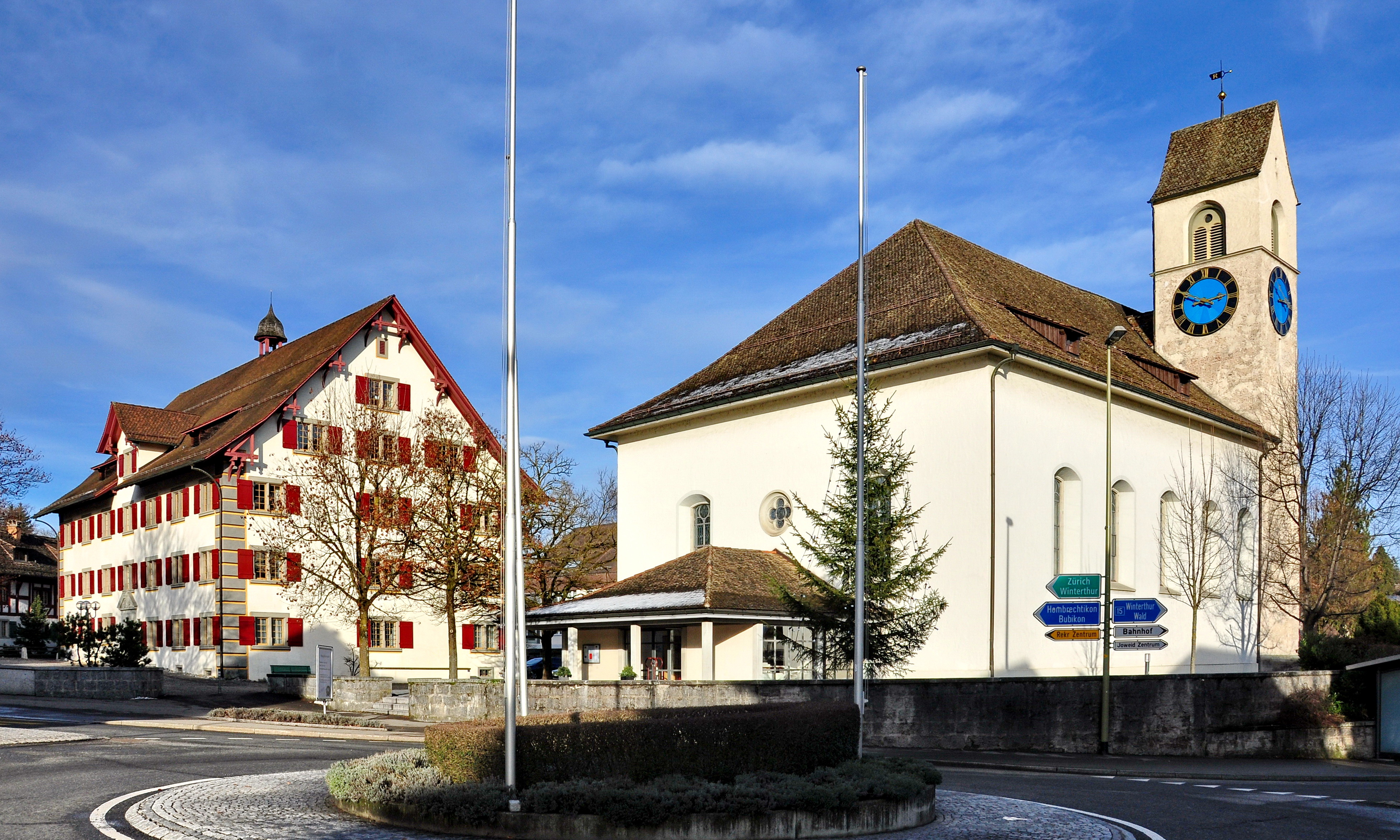
Amthaus and the former monastery's church

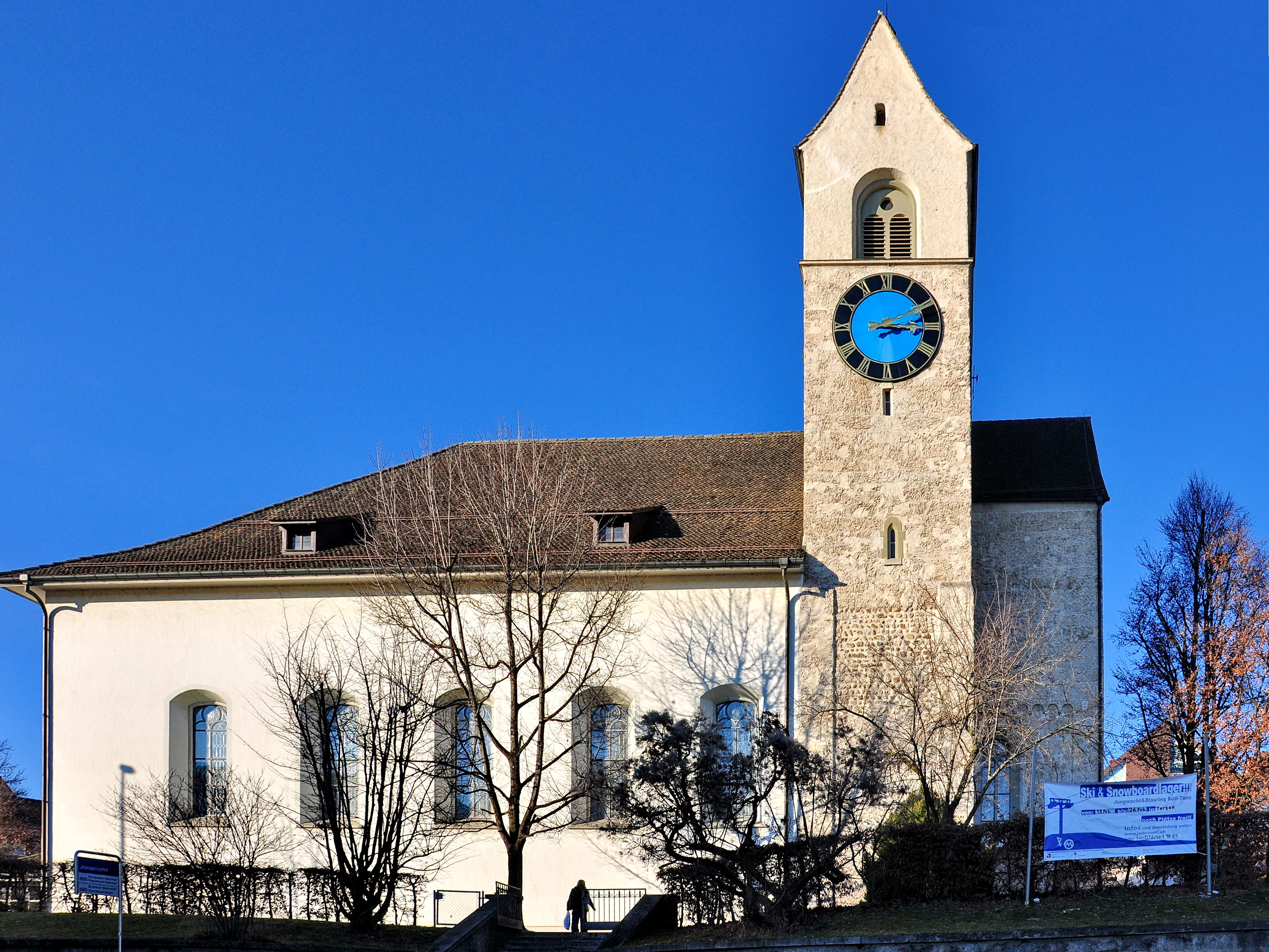
As seen from Bandwiesstrasse

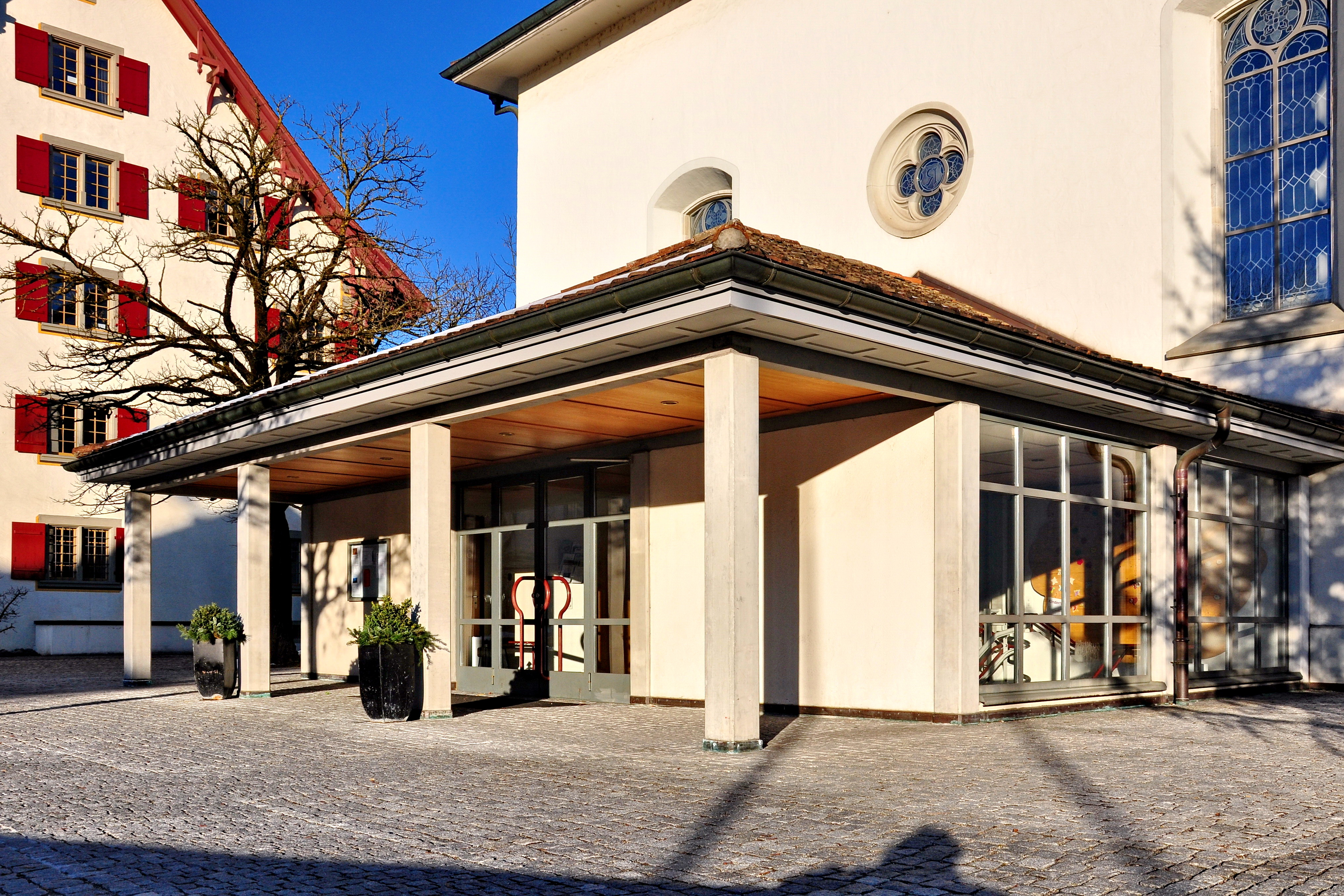
The entrance hall of the former monastery's church where the burial vault of the Counts of Toggenburg was situated

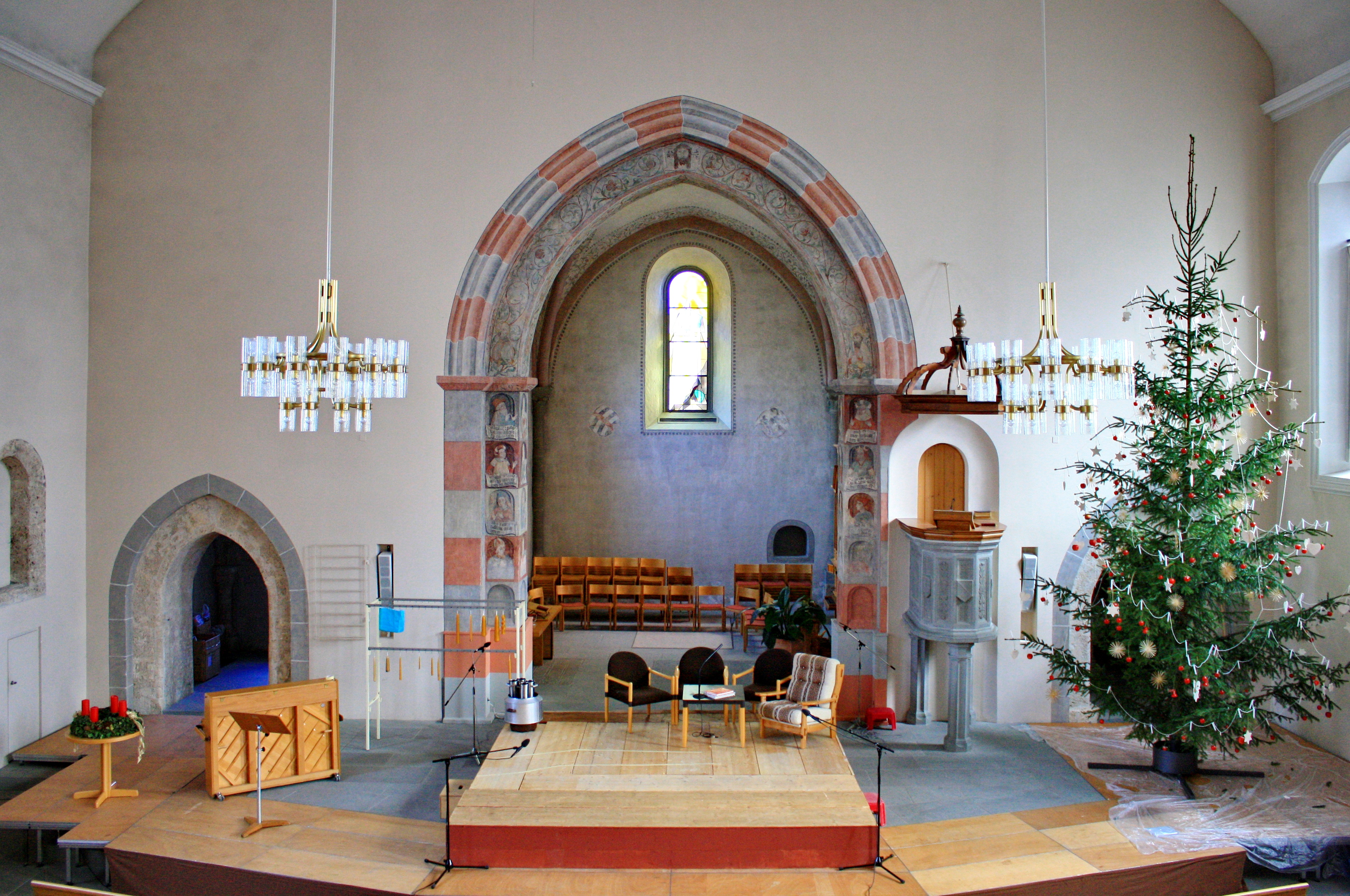
Interior respectively the apse of the Rüti church

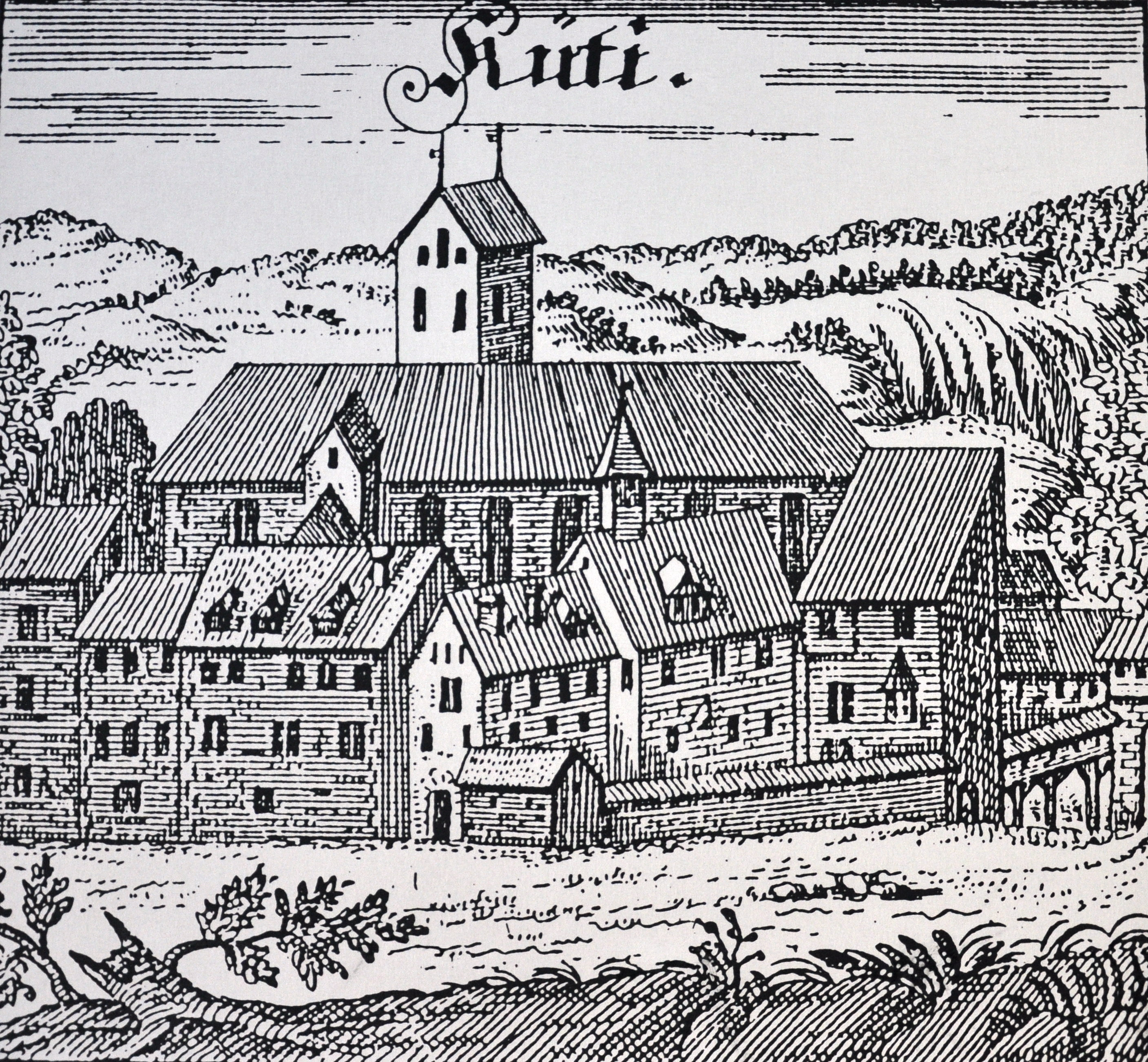
Drawing by Johann Melchior Füssli (1700)

== History ==
In 1206 the estate for the monastery was given by Liutold IV, Count of Regensberg, and it was confirmed on 6 May 1219 by his brother, Eberhard, Archbishop of Salzburg. The church and rights were transferred by Rudolf I von Rapperswil and Diethelm of Toggenburg to the convent in 1229. On the upper Lake Zürich peninsula at Oberbollingen, a St. Nicholas Chapel is mentioned, where around 1229 a small Cistercian (later Premonstratensian) monastery was established by the Counts of Rapperswil. That nunnery is estimated to have been (administratively) part of the Rüti Monastery; in 1267 it was united with the nearby Mariazell Wurmsbach Abbey.

Initially founded as a branch of the Premonstratensian Abbey in Churwalden, Rüti Monastery, commonly known as monastery of Saint Mary, was placed by the Bishop of Constance in 1230 to the Weissenau (Minderau) abbey and was part of the administrative district of Zirkaria Swabia. The construction of the monastery's cathedral started in 1214 and probably was finished in 1283. In 1286, for financial reason, the Countess Elisabeth von Rapperswil had to sell her farm estate in Oberdürnten including the associated rights (in particular the lower courts) to the Rüti Monastery. But the House of Rapperswil also supported the Rüti Monastery in the following decades, so Johann's I son, Johann II, assigned an estate and all rights in the name of his younger siblings on 17 June 1340.

The convent was generously endowed with money and goods by the aristocratic families in northeastern Switzerland, enabling it to buy the rights to parish churches and additional estates, among them in Aadorf by the Landenberg-Greifensee family in 1358, Bassersdorf, Dürnten, Elsau-Räterschen in 1398, Erlenbach, Eschenbach, Eschlikon, Fehraltorf, Fischenthal, Gossau, Hinwil, Hofstetten, Mönchaltorf, Neubrunn-Turbenthal, Rapperswil, Seegräben, Uster in 1438, Uznach, Wangen in der March in 1407, Wil-Dreibrunnen, Winterthur, Zollikerberg, Zollikon and Zürich. By gift, purchase and exchange, Rüti Monastery enlarged its ownership, concentrated in the early 15th century in Rüti (Ferrach and Oberdürnten), between Greifensee and Pfäffikersee and on the northeastern shore on so-called Obersee, the upper part of Zürichsee (Lake Zürich). Rüti was an important stage point along the Jakobsweg (Way of St. James) leading via Rapperswil and the wooden bridge at the Seedamm lake crossing to the Einsiedeln Abbey.

A unique document is related to one of the members of the Rüti convent: On 5 December 1374 Bilgri von Kloten declared that he and his legitimate daughter Margret Bertschinger do not raise any claims to a land, sealed by the Vogt of Rapperswil.

In 1408 the Rüti village and the monastery came under the reign of the government of the city of Zürich as part of the so-called Herrschaft Grüningen. Among many other transfers of lands and goods, on 12 May 1433 Heini Murer von Grueningen and his wife Anna Keller confirmed the transfer of their lands on Lutzelnoew island for 100 Pfund Pfennig Zürcher Währung to the Abbot Johans and the convent of the Rüti Monastery, including numerous buildings and lands in the Herrschaft Grüningen, and the document confirmed also the couple's wish to be enrolled in the monastery's libri anniversariorum (German: Jahrzeitbuch).

On 11 June 1443 marauders of the Old Swiss Confederacy plundered the monastery in the Old Zürich War, and the graves of Count Friedrich VII of Toggenburg, among them the Count of Thierstein and other nobilities, were desecrated: Item si brachen die greber in dem münster uff, und truogent die todten lichnam heruss, graf frdrichen von toggenburg, und schluogent jm ain stain in den mund; graf waldraffen von tierstain schütten si uss dem bom [tomb], und wurffen ainander mit sinen gebainen. The devastation by the confederates met the monastery, materially and idealistic. The plundering of the region weakened the monastic manorial, and the desecration of the graves diminished the importance of the monastery as preferred burial place of the nobility. Memoria for the noble families remain largely intact during the Reformation in Zürich to the demolition of the Toggenburgerkapelle vault and partial new construction of the present Rüti Reformed Church in 1771.

== Burials at Rüti Monastery ==
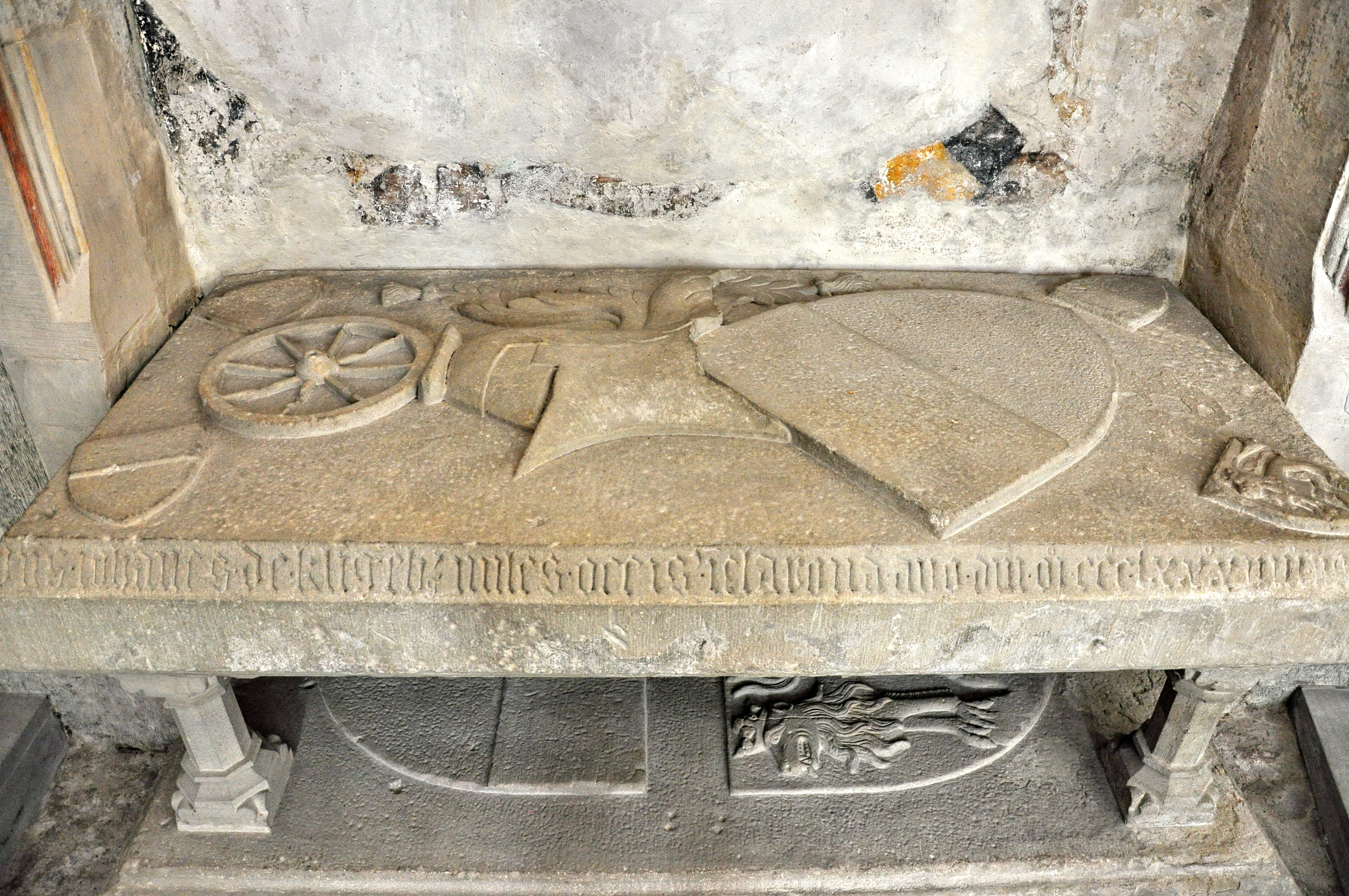
Ledger stone of knight Johann von Klingenberg

On 29 November 1389, seven months after the Battle of Näfels, the abbot Bilgeri von Wagenberg moved about 100 bodies (in fact, their bones) of the Swiss-Austrian knights and soldiers, among them his brother Johann von Klingenberg, from the battle field and reburied them (most of them in a mass grave within the church) at Rüti Monastery. The members of the Toggenburg family were buried in the so-called Toggenburger Gruft, a burial vault where is as of today the entrance hall to the church. In addition, there was a large number of members of noble families/knights living nearby (Regensberg family excluded) and the families of the latter Amtsmann, the representatives of the city of Zürich between 1525 and 1789. Most of these gravestones are lost, destroyed – probably the ones of the nobilities in June 1443 by the Swiss troops in the Old Zürich War – or were re-used for buildings etc.

== Counts of Toggenburg and Elisabeth von Mätsch ==
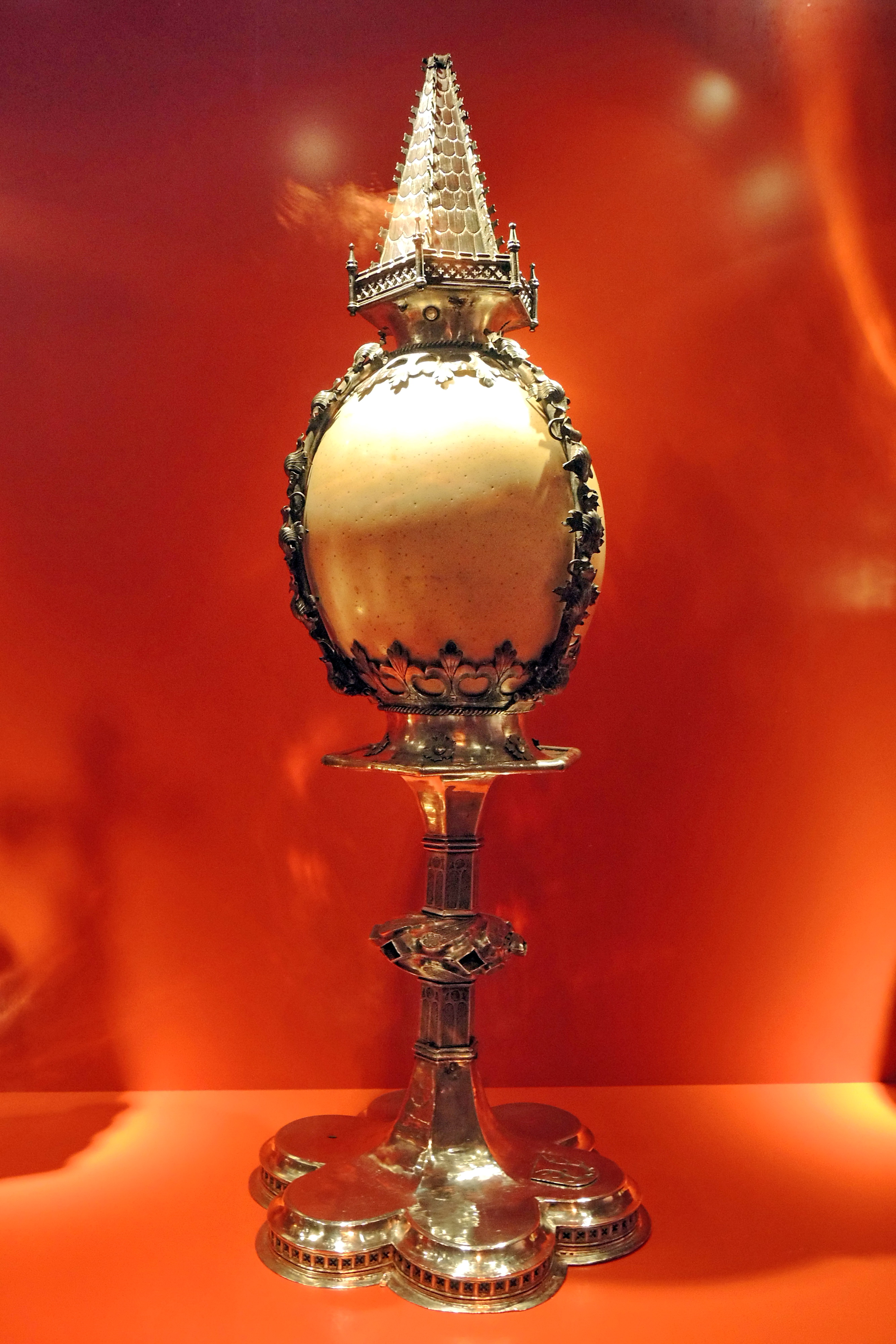
Reliquiar believed given by Elisabeth von Mätsch to the Rüti Monastery in 1439, Stadtmuseum Rapperswil-Jona

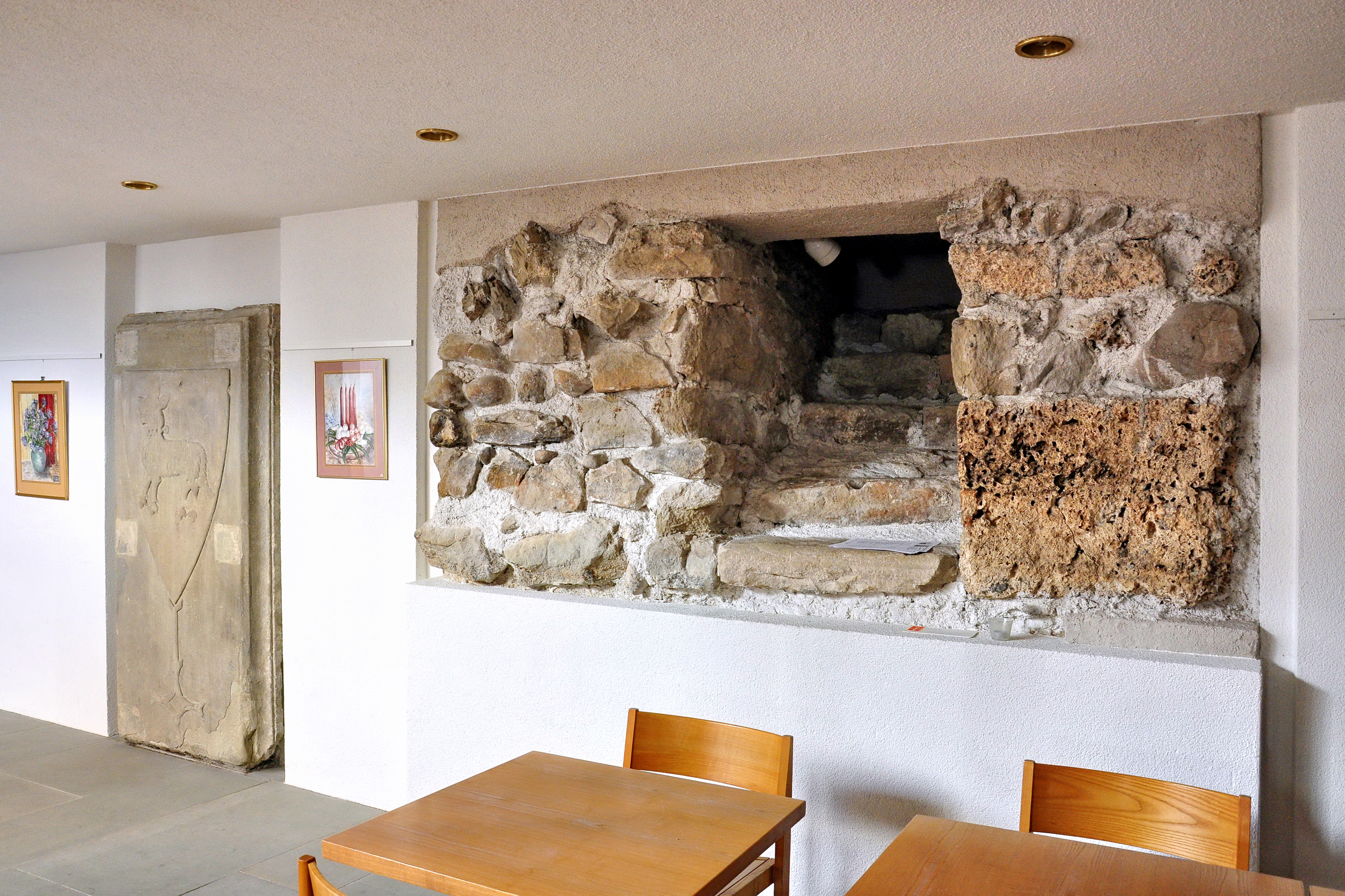
Toggenburg burial vault

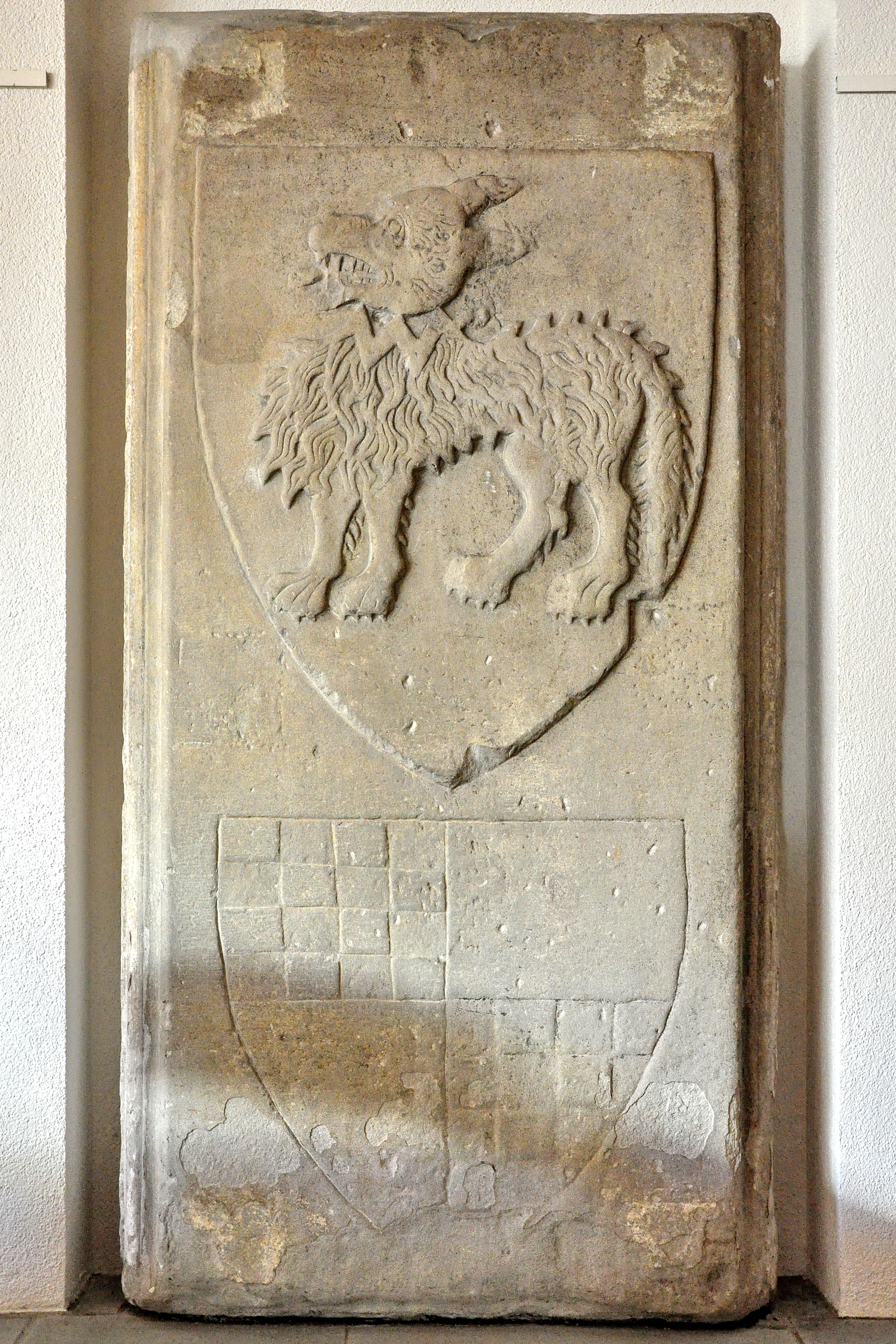
one of the few remaining tomb stones of the Toggenburg family, Toggenburgergruft beneath the present entrance area of the church

The members of the Toggenburg family were buried in the so-called Toggenburger Gruft, a burial vault where is as of today the entrance hall to the church. On 23 April 1398 Count Donat von Toggenburg donated the church of Elsow as benefice for the new Allerheiligenaltar at the grave of the Toggenburg family, for the salvation of his daughter soul Menta von Toggenburg who died shortly before.

Count Fridrich von Toggenburg, Herr zu Brettengow und Tafas donated to "his own and the salvation of his ancestor who were buried and he also expects to be buried" the church, rights and lands (Kirchwidem and Kirchensatz) in Wangen in der March, sealed by Fridrich and the knights Herman von Landenberg, Johans von Bonstetten from Ustra and Herman von der Hochenlandenberg on 21 January 1407. Count Friedrich VII of Toggenburg died in 1436 and was buried probably in 1439 in a chapel, the so-called Toggenburger Kapelle (capella nova in latere monasterii de novo construxit) given by his noble wife, Countess Elisabeth von Toggenburg, née von Mätsch. On 5 September 1439 Elisabeth von Mätsch instigated a parsonage for the purpose of a daily Mass to Friedrich's and her own salvation, and for this purpose she bequeathed the monastery the amount of 1,300 Rheinische Gulden in gold and precious gems with ornaments (pretiosa ornamenta) to the Rüti Monastery where 14 members of the family were buried, and Countess Elisabeth probably lived in her late years. During her lifetime, Countess Elisabeth chose the priest who should hold the Mass in the new chapel of the monastery church. After her death, the foundation provided that the abbot and his convent hold a daily Mass and the usual periodicals, and that to the priest in charge was given board and lodge, as well as ten Rheinische Gulden at Christmas, financed by Elisabeth's foundation. The abbot of Einsiedeln had to pay attention to the fulfillment of these obligations and received in this way influence on the life of the Rüti convention respectively the convent had the hermit pin to pay fifty Florins for non-compliance. The document was draft by Eberhart Wüst von Rapperswil, the bistum's notar, on 5 September 1439 at 4 pm and confirmed by the abbot Johans and the members of the convent: Prior Johans Murer, Subprior Johans Schiltknecht, Heinrich Lörri, Erhard Baumgarter, Johans Berger, Heinrich Witenwiler, Ulrich Clinger and Ulrich Glarner.

Elisabeth Countess of Toggenburg spent her last days in the Rüti Monastery, and she was for the last time mentioned on 20 June 1442 as its inhabitant: Elisabeth von Toggemburg...Graf Ffriedrich von Toggenburg and many of his ancestors haven chosen to be buried in the Rüti Monastery, which is why she has retreated there ("unser wesen gentzlich in dasselbe gotzhus got zuo dienende gezogen haben") and elected her tomb to be with her husband after her death... Her probably last will attested that she devised to the convent a specifically named jewel, namely 1300 Rheinische Gulden for...[as per 5 September 1439]... also a beaded ("berlachtes") chasuble, a gilded "tryenvass", the big monstrance with the mandrel the crown of Christ, the small monstrance with an attached closure ("Schlössli") heart-shaped, four chasubles made of velvet and damask, two silk decorative ceiling ("Golter") in green and red, and a silk tapestry ("uffschlag")... The document is sealed by Countess Elisabeth and knight Albrecht von Landemberg von Breitenlandemberg (Tösstal).

On 11 June 1443 marauding troops of the Old Swiss Confederacy devastated the monastery Rüti and desecrated the bodies of the nobles, including Count Friedrich VII who they held responsible for the war with Zürich, and the scavengers pelted with the remains like schoolboys with snowballs.

== Dissolution ==
On 22 April 1525 Abbot Felix Klauser, with important documents, money and parts of the monastery's treasury, fled for refuge to the city of Rapperswil, where he died in a house belonging to the monastery in early 1530. On 17 June 1525, following the Reformation in Zürich, the monastery was secularized; three of the monks converted to Protestantism and died in the Battle of Kappel, three remained in Rüti, and Sebastian Hegner, the last conventual died in exile in Rapperswil in 1561. Two years ago, an arbitration tribunal in Rapperswil decided among others: Sebastian Hegner had to pay the fees that were confiscated to the city of Zürich, to resign to reinstate the Rüti Monastery, subject to a decision by a Christian council and a common reformation, and Hegner had to force the abbot of the Reichenau convent to give over all documents related the Rüti Monastery. In return, the city of Zürich pledged safe-conduct within the area of the city republic of Zürich and to preserve Hegner from harm and to refund all property back to Sebastian Hegner. The council of the city of Zürich also agreed corn and wine to pay in kind and the amount of 35 Gulden at Christmas at his new domicile in Rapperswil. The document was sealed by Lux Ritter, alt Schultheiss of the city of Luzern, Cristoffel Schorno, stadtholder and military representative in Schwyz, and Gilg Tschudi, Landammann in Glarus, on 26 January 1559.

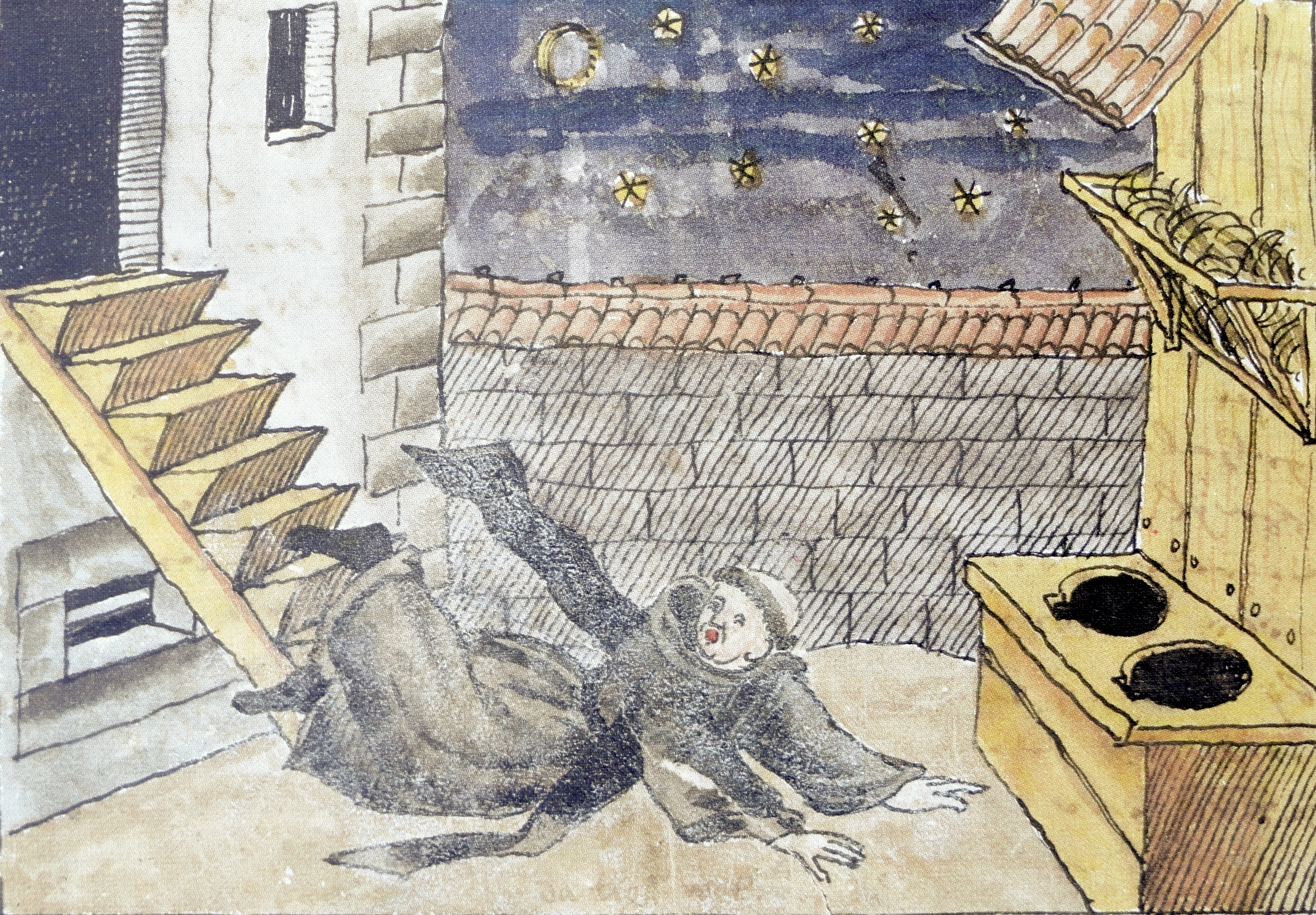
Sebastian Hegner, last surviving member of the convent, falls and dies in Rapperswil on 10 November 1561

The monastery's treasury, left in Rapperswil, is conserved today in the Stadtmuseum Rapperswil. The enormous number of estates of the former monastery — around 185 localities in northeastern Switzerland — were managed as Amt Rüti by an Amtmann (member of the city of Zürich government) until 1798. Following the Reformation in Zürich, Rüti got one of the first public schools in the canton of Zürich, established by the Prophezei reformers and some of the former monks of the monastery.

== List of Abbots ==
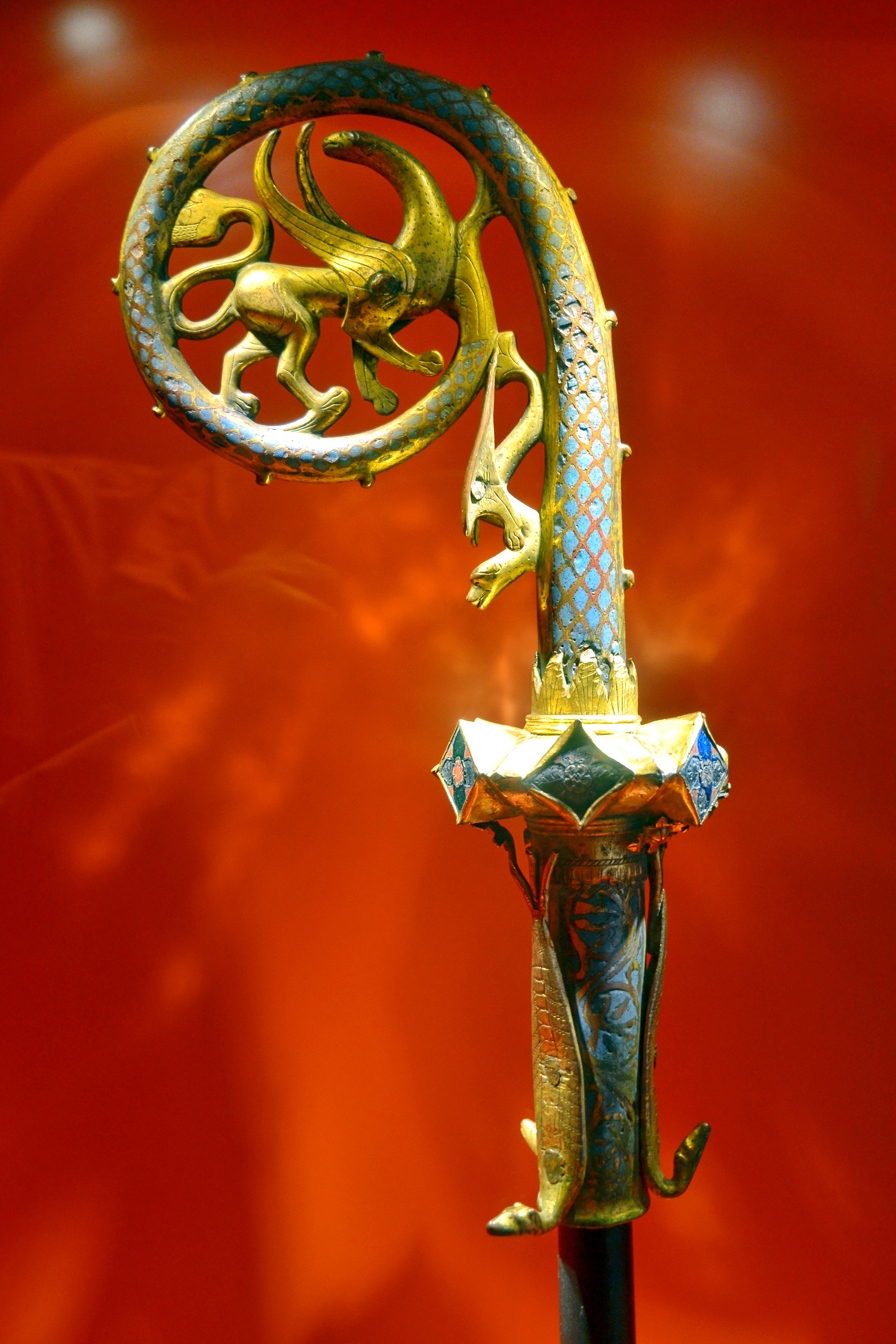
Abbot's crozier, treasury of the former Rüti Monastery in the Stadtmuseum Rapperswil

	Name	acted as	from/to	remarks
1.	Ulrich	Propst	1206–1221	
2.	Luther	Prior, Propst	1221–1224	
3.	Eberhard	Propst	1224–1226	
4.	Berchtold	Abbot	1226–1237	
5.	Ulrich II.	Propst	1237–1257	
6.	Heinrich I.	Abbot	1259–1266	
7.	Wernher	Prior, Abbot	1272 (?)	
8.	Heinrich II.	Abbot		
9.	Walther	Abbot	1279–1283	
10.	Johannes I. von Rheinfelden	Abbot	1286–1300	
11.	Johannes II.	Abbot	1300–1317	
12.	Hesso	Abbot	1319–1342	
13.	Heinrich III. von Schaffhausen	Abbot	1346–1379	
14.	Bilgeri (Peregrinus) von Wagenberg	Abbot	1379–1394	
15.	Gottfried (Götz) Schultheiss	Abbot	1394–1422	
16.	Albrecht (Albertus)	Abbot	1422–1426	
17.	Johannes III. Zingg	Abbot	1428–1446	
18.	Johannes IV. Murer	Abbot	1446–1467	
19.	Ulrich Tennenberg	Abbot	1467–1477	
20.	Markus (Marx) Wiler	Abbot	1477–1502	initiated the interior decoration of the Rüti Reformed Church's choir
21.	Felix Klauser	Abbot	1503–1525	Felix Klauser died in early 1530. Andreas Diener was chosen to be his successor, on April 5, 1530, the election was revoked.

== Buildings ==
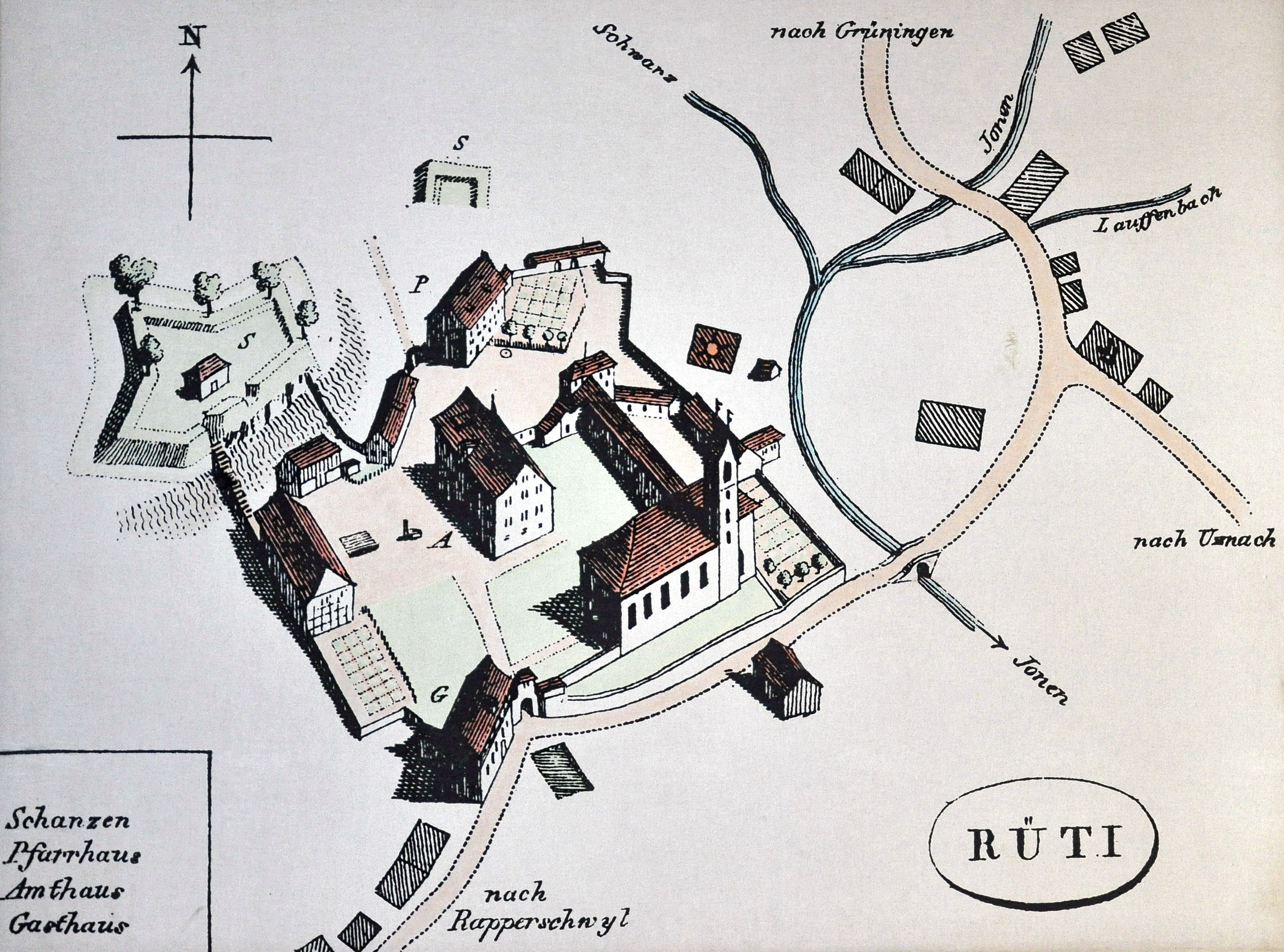
Map of the monastery (1800)

The monastery comprised a hospital, a pilgrims hospice, stables, buildings for the monks, the cloister that was connecting the buildings protected by a stone wall, and a large number of additional buildings, among them at least one mill that was using the waterpower of the Schwarz and Jona rivers.

The present structure of the former monastery church, as of today the Reformed church in Rüti, was built from 1206 to 1283 and rebuilt in 1706 and again in 1770. The church has one tower on the south. The interior is decorated with painted stucco created in the 1480/90s.

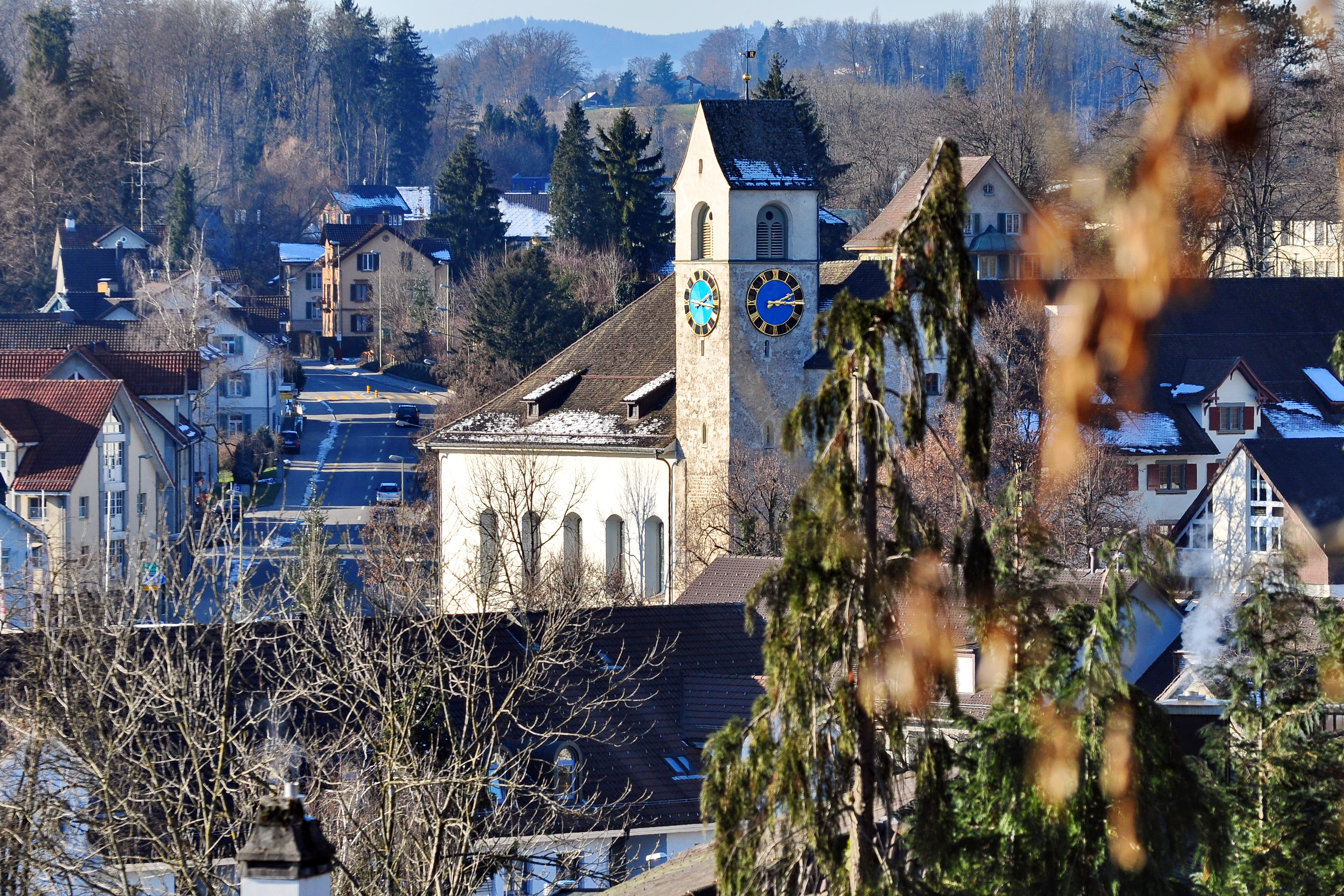
The former site of the monastery respectively the Rüti Reformed Church as seen from Schlossberg

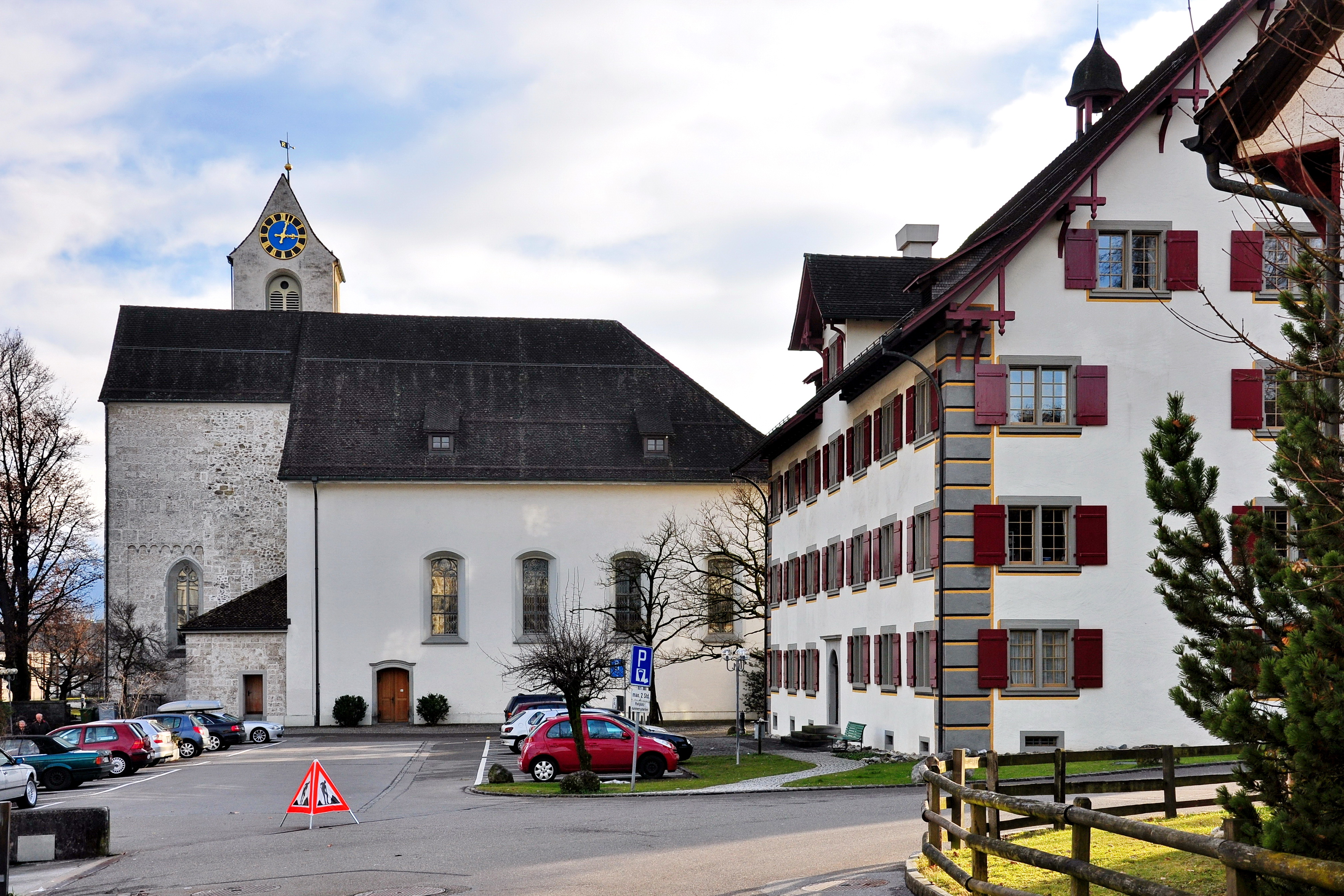
Klosterhof square in Rüti: The former monastery's church, Amthaus to the right

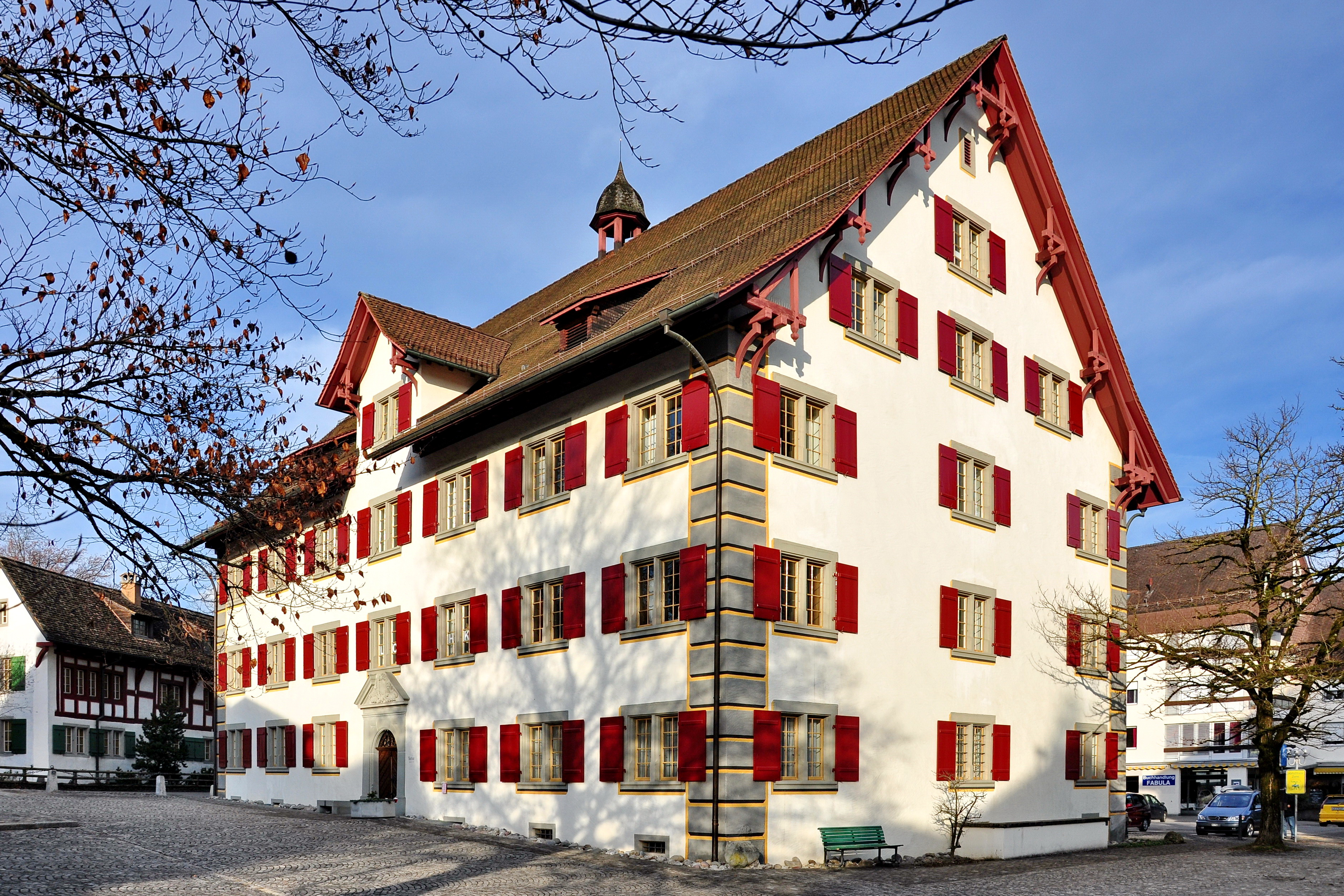
Amthaus

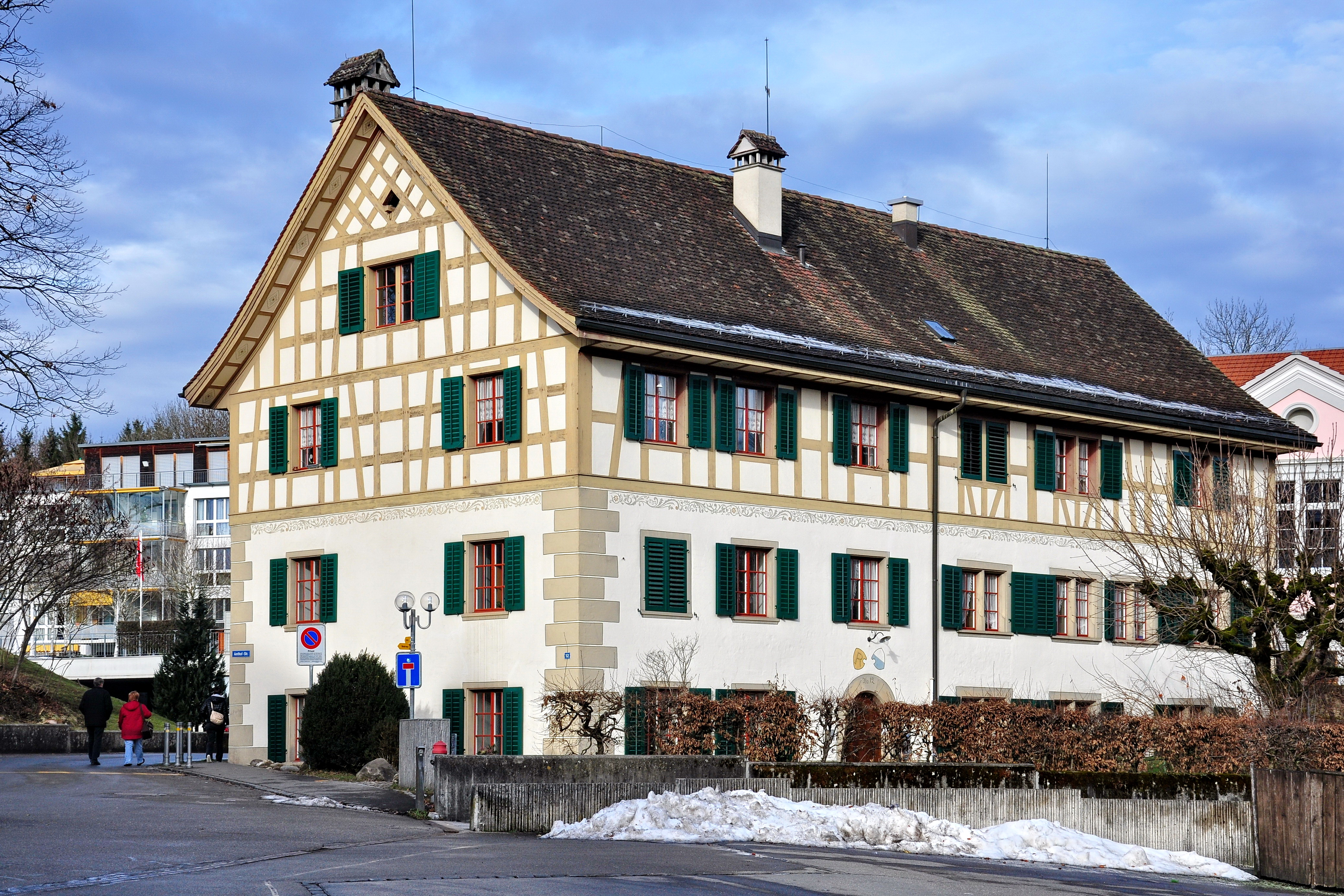
Pfarrhaus (rectory)

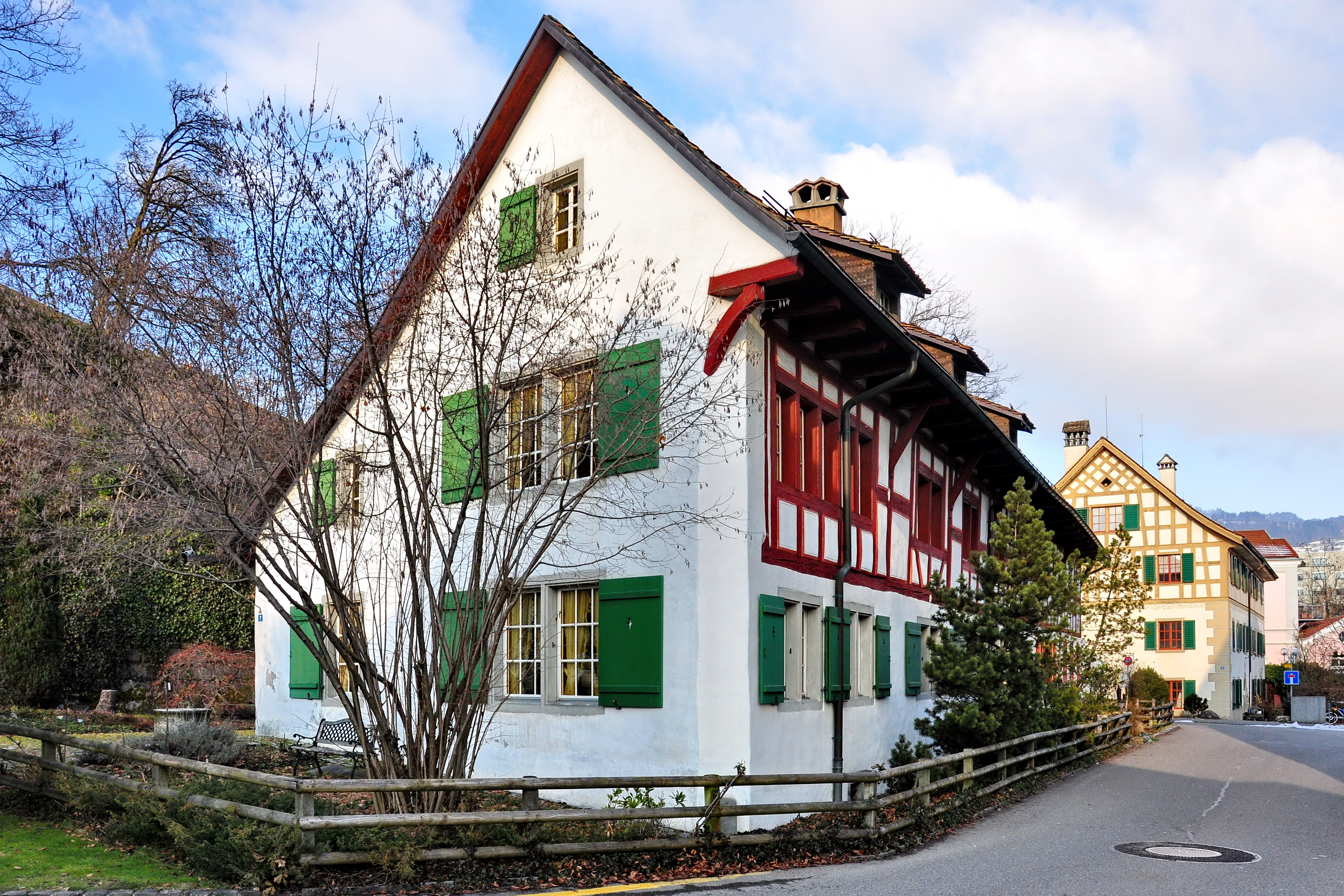
Spitzerliegenschaft, the rectory in the background

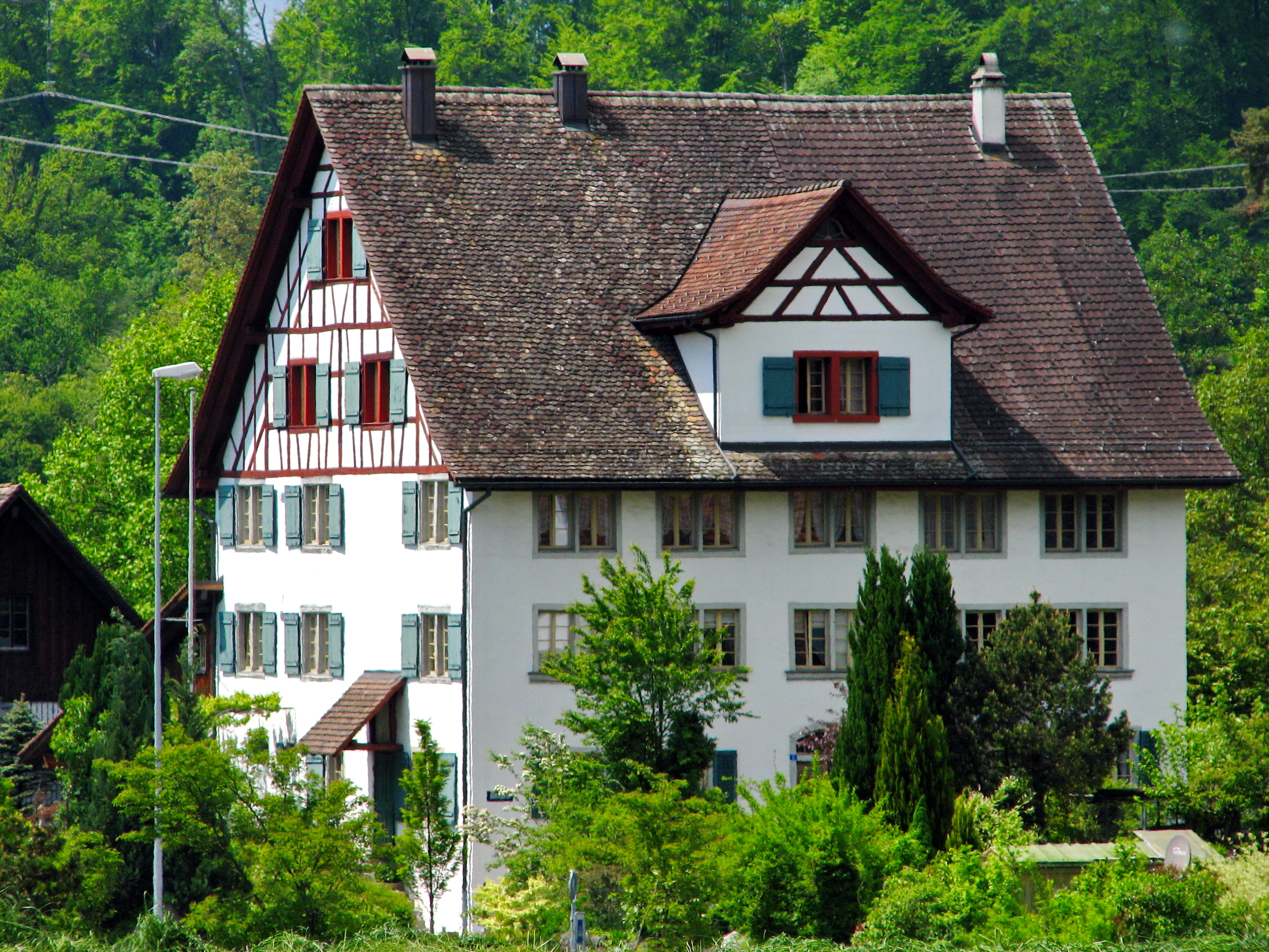
Hüllistein estate in Rüti, a so-called Rütihof, i.e. a former fief by the monastery

Most of the monastery's buildings were destroyed by fire in 1706. The remaining buildings were built probably in the early 16th century: the so-called "Spitzerliegenschaft" (stable and warehouse) and the Pfarrhaus (rectory). The Amthaus (Bailiff's house) was rebuilt in 1706 and serves as library, Kindergarten, as a museum of local history and site of the archives of the municipality of Rüti, and the present Rüti Church was used as Reformed church of the municipality Rüti and the village of Tann.

== Protection ==
The remaining structures of the monastery – Rüti Reformed Church and the three buildings related to the monastery – are listed in the Swiss inventory of cultural property of national and regional significance as a Class A object.

== See also ==
- Reformation in Zürich
- Ritterhaus Bubikon
- Rüti Reformed Church

== Literature ==
- Peter Niederhäuser und Raphael Sennhauser: Adelsgrablegen und Adelsmemoria im Kloster Rüti. In: Kunst + Architektur in der Schweiz, Volume 54, No. 1, 2003.
- Bernard Andenmatten und Brigitte Degler-Spengler (Red.): Die Prämonstratenser und Prämonstratenserinnen in der Schweiz. In: Helvetia Sacra IV/3, Basel 2002. ISBN 978-3-7965-1218-6.
- Roger Sablonier: Adel im Wandel. Untersuchungen zur sozialen Situation des ostschweizerischen Adels um 1300. Chronos-Verlag, Zürich 1979/2000. ISBN 978-3-905313-55-0.
- Emil Wüst: Kunst in der Reformierten Kirche Rüti ZH. Hrsg. Kirchenpflege Rüti, 1989.
