= Stadtmuseum Rapperswil-Jona =

Museum in Rapperswil-Jona, Switzerland

Coordinates: 47°13′42″N 8°49′7″E

Stadtmuseum Rapperswil-Jona is a museum of local history and art in Rapperswil, canton of St. Gallen in Switzerland.

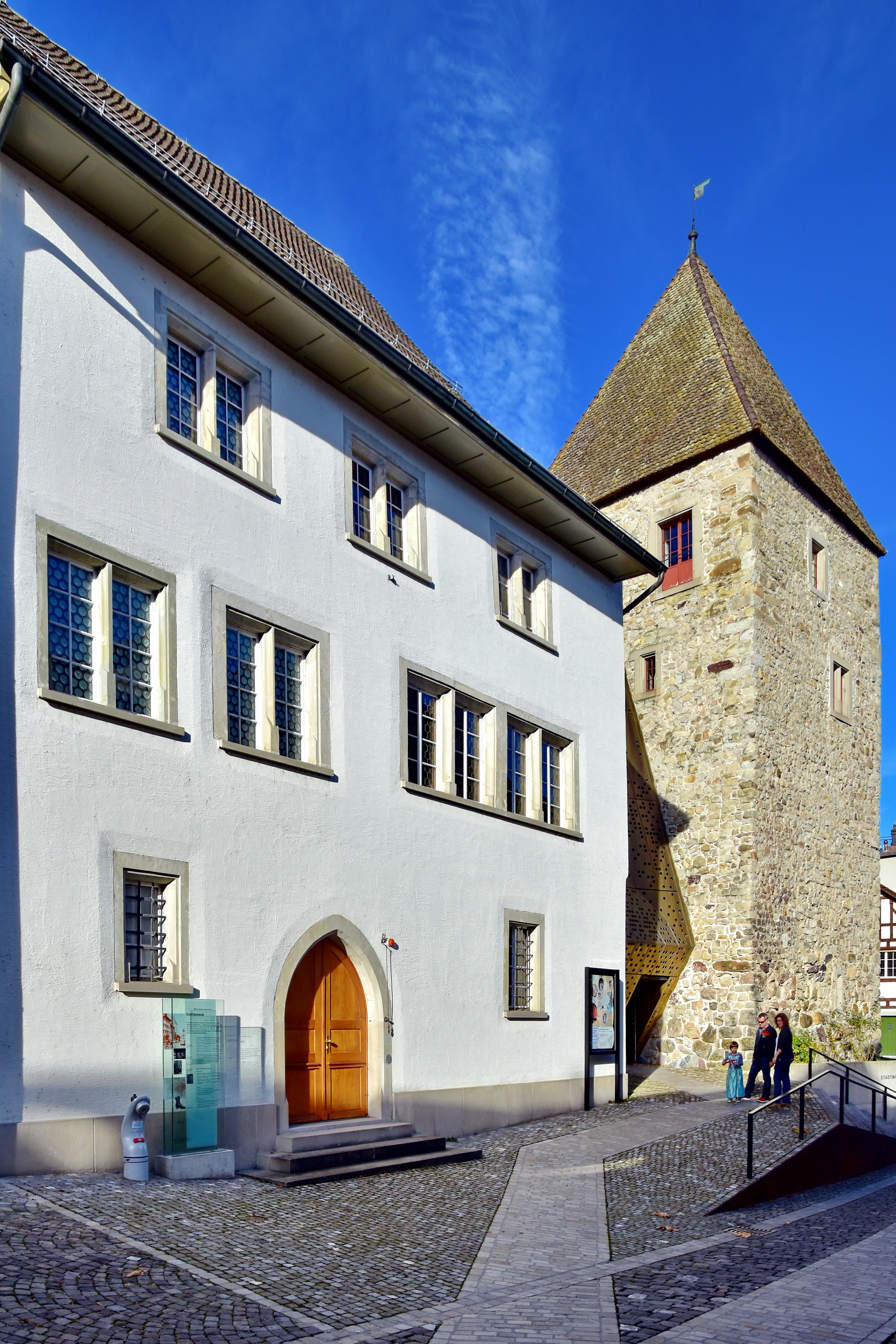
Stadtmuseum Rapperswil

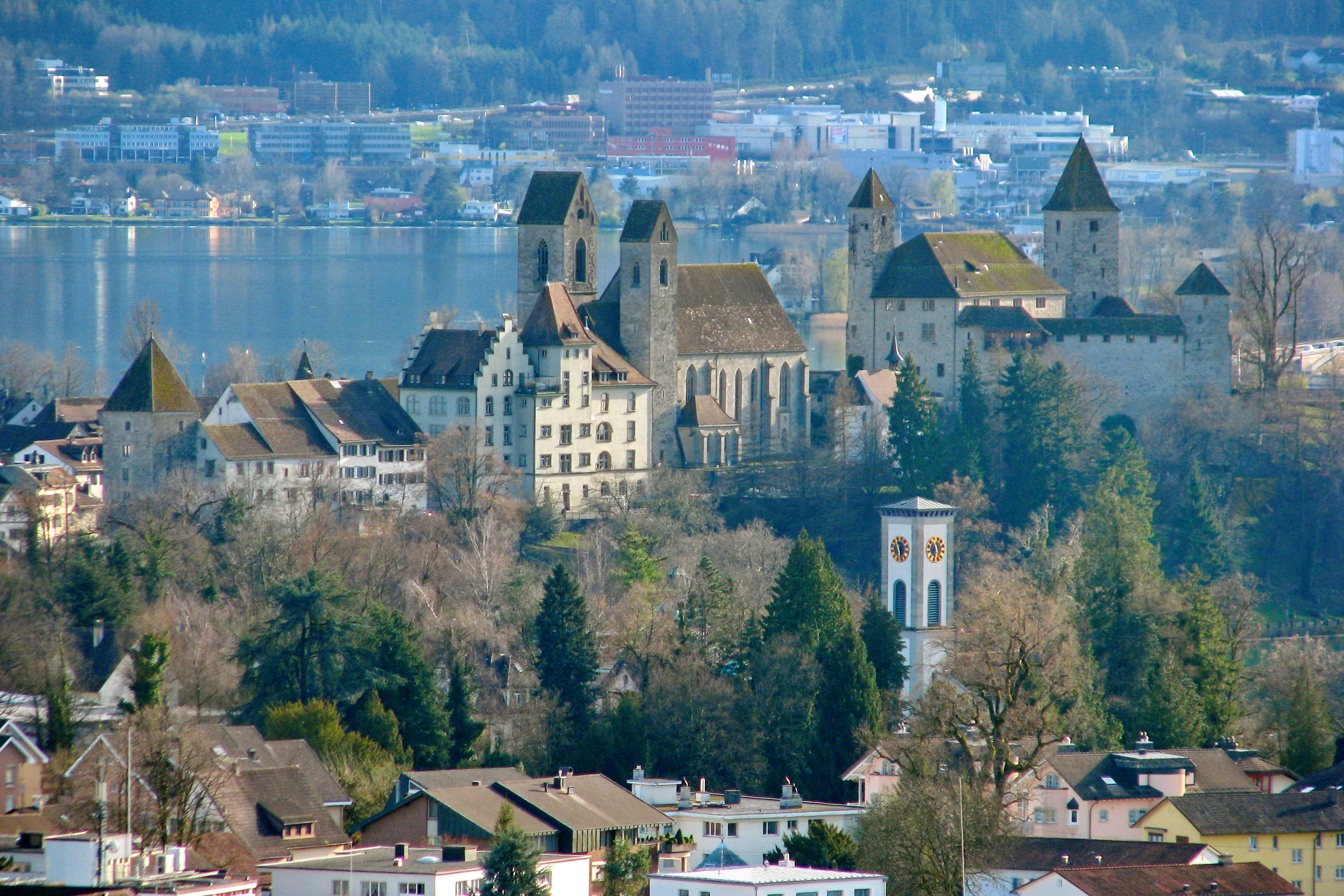
Herrenberg hill and town walls of Rapperswil: Rapperswil Castle to the right, Liebfrauenkapelle, Stadtpfarrkirche, Herrenberg primary school and Stadtmuseum to the left, as seen from Kempraten, Seedamm and Hurden in the background

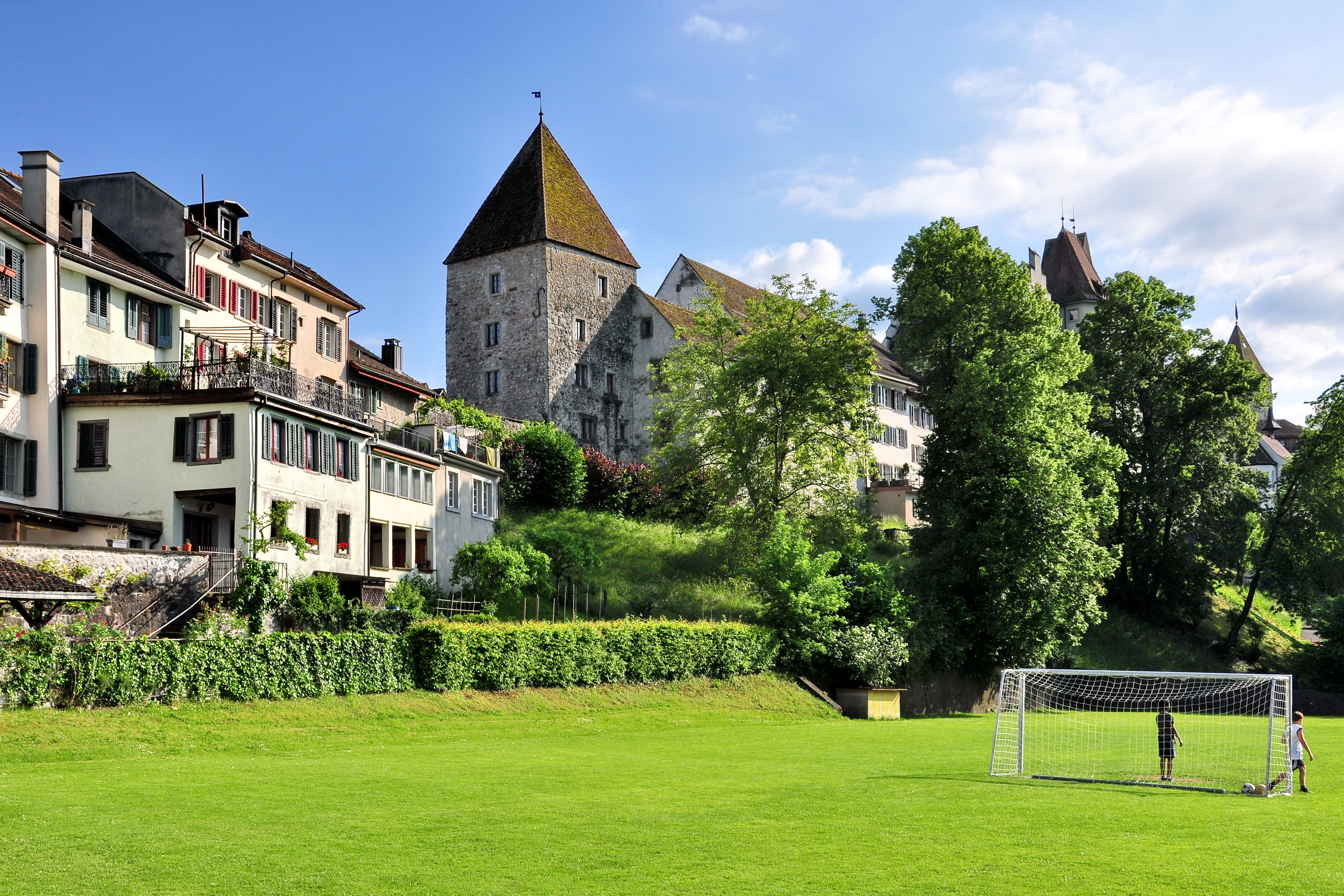
Northeastern town walls, Breny tower and Breny house, as seen from lakeside Giessi

== Location ==
The museum is situated in three Middle Ages buildings, remains of a former castle as part of the town walls of Rapperswil, as of today in the so-called Breny house, a keep, and in the Breny tower and an intermediate section that was a battlement of the town wall at Herrenberg hill. The buildings are situated between Schloss Rapperswil, Stadtpfarrkirche Rapperswil and Engelplatz square.

== Breny house and Breny tower ==
Breny house and Breny tower are part of the remains of the northeastern town walls of the medieval city of Rapperswil. The buildings date back to early 13th century AD, when the lords of Russikon (Russinger) built a residential tower respectively a small castle as servants (Ministerials) of the Counts of Rapperswil. In its present form, it was built in 1492 by the knight Hans of Landenberg from the Töss Valley replacing the former seat of the lords of Russikon. The Landenberg family officiated in Rapperswil as mayors and councils to 1530. Subsequent occupants were from 1530 to 1660 the Göldlin family, then the Good family, and from 1758 the Breny family. The former castle with its 28 metres (92 ft) high residential tower at the so-called Herrenberg ("castle hill") marked in the 16th century the urban expansion of the Middle Ages city to the northeast. The buildings were part of the northeasterly town walls at the bay of Kempraten on Lake Zürich shore heading to the so-called Herrenbergtor gate (broken in 1848).

The largely conserved residential facilities date back to the 16th century when the castle was owned by Thuring Göldli. The Gothic hall with beamed ceiling and flower garlands, like the other rooms in the initial stage of construction, is largely preserved. The living room is decorated with late Gothic and partly overpainted wall painting among them the coats of arms of the Landenberg and Hünenberg families (as of 1492). The Breny room ("Breny-Stube") and the Landenberg room (as of 1503) are in their original condition.

The very first roses in Rapperswil blossom at the Breny tower and at the Stadtpfarrkirche Rapperswil next to the Schloss Rapperswil because their medieval sandstone walls are exposed to the sun all through the year.

== Museum of local history and art ==
=== History ===
Under the patronage of the transport association (Verkehrsverein) Rapperswil-Jona, the museum was established in 1943 as "Heimatmuseum lokaler Geschichte und Kunst" (museum of local history and art). As a legacy of the sisters Paulina and Henrika Breny, the buildings, as of today commonly called "Breny-Haus" and "Breny-Turm", are situated at former Obere Halsgasse, and administrated by the city of Rapperswil. In 2008, some Rapperswil residents petitioned local authorities to evict the Polish Museum from its home in the Rapperswil Castle, as two historical museum locations (Stadtmuseum and Polish Museum) estimated to be too expensive. The Polish Museum is conducting a petition campaign to retain the Museum in the castle; Stadtmuseum will be kept respectively in 2010/11 renewed at its actual location.

=== Activities ===
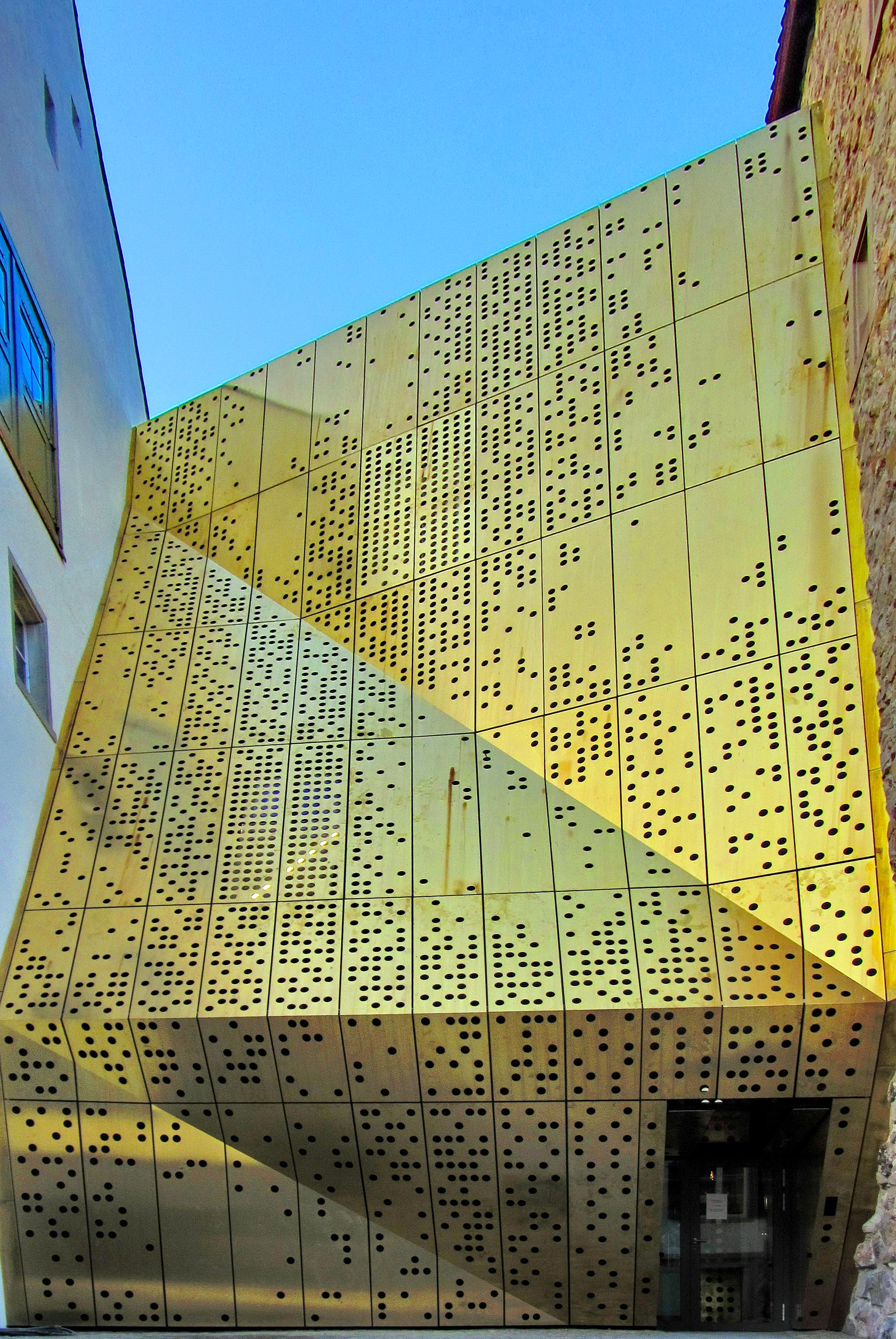
A new building connecting the two historical museum buildings was completed in 2011

In December 2009, the project "Janus" presented the results of an evaluation for public vote by the citizens of Rapperswil-Jona. The city museum will be renewed from January 2010 to autumn 2011, and therefore will be closed for visitors. Its historical intermediate section between Breny house and Breny tower will probably replaced by a purposive construction integrated into the historic street-scape between Stadtpfarrkirche (parish church) and Engelplatz square. This new building serves both, as an exhibition space as well as connection between the two historical museum buildings. The formative north side of the town walls will be kept as it is. Investment and operating costs of around 5.6 million Swiss francs will be borne equally between local community and political community Rapperswil-Jona. Simultaneously with the realization of the project, the accumulated maintenance work on the facades, windows and roofs of the historic buildings and the town wall will be done.

=== Sights ===
Along with temporary exhibits, main sights are the prehistoric and Roman archaeological finds, particularly from the extensive excavations at Kempraten, the former Roman vicus Centum Prata. Other exhibits are medieval coat of arms of the city of Rapperswil, a goblet of Countess Elizabeth of Rapperswil, the late Gothic living hall and religious goldsmiths, including the mitre, the crosier, particulate monstrance from the monastery treasury of Premonstratensian Rüti Abbey. The intermediate section (as of October 2009) is home to the Breny and Göldli rooms with antique portraits from the Renaissance, the Curti room of Rapperswil silk merchants from the 15th century and the Greith room. In the Breny tower there are a scale model of the city of Rapperswil showing the city as it was in 1800, further information on history and the city fortifications as well as examples of medieval weapons, pharmacy, shoe-making and kiln ceramics from Rapperswil.

The previous conventional presentation of the collection objects was replaced in 2012/12 by a multimedia "history experience", i.e., by visual and audible interaction with the visitors.

== Gallery ==
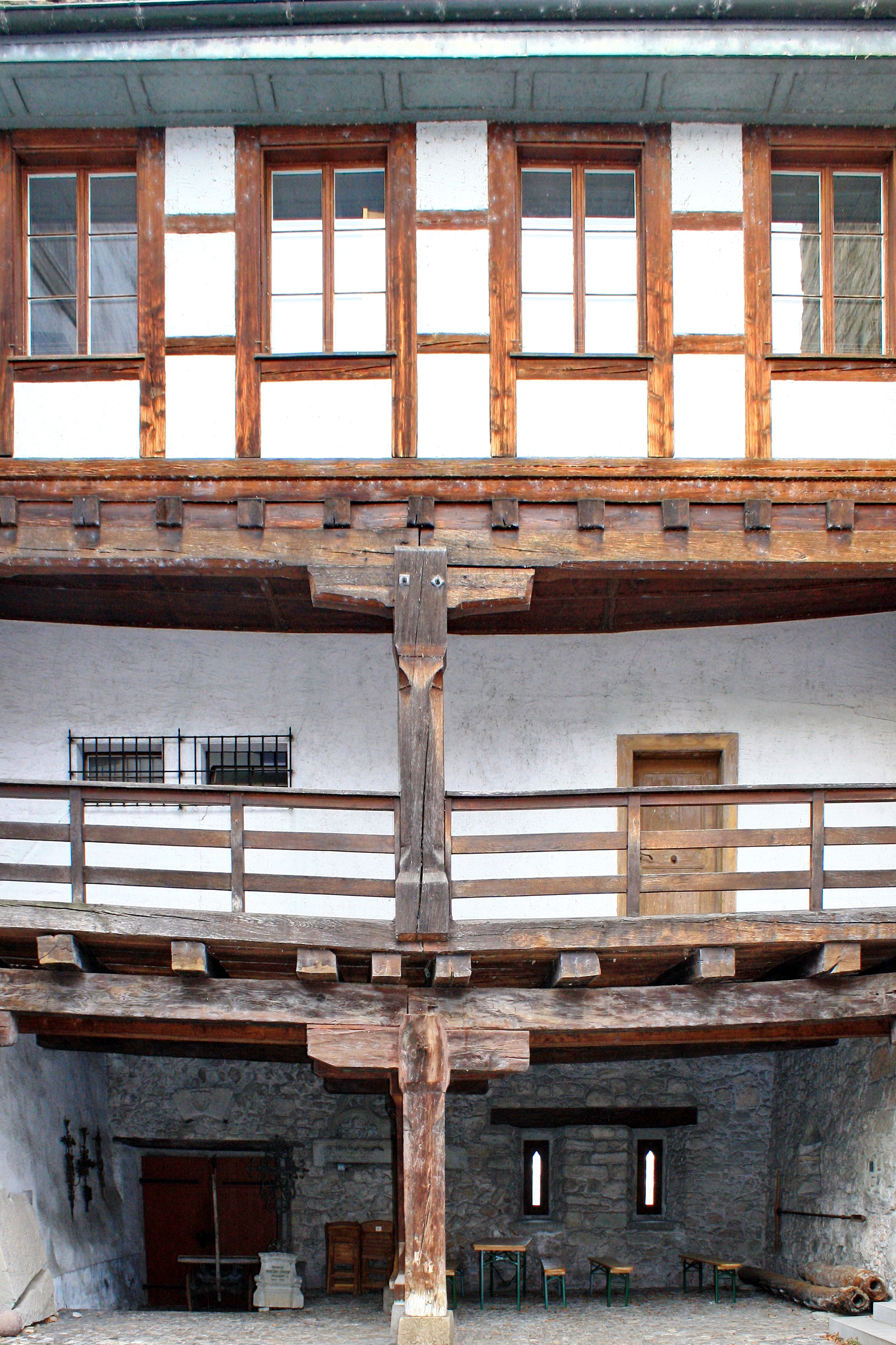
The former intermediate section between Breny tower and Breny house, a remain of the medieval town wall

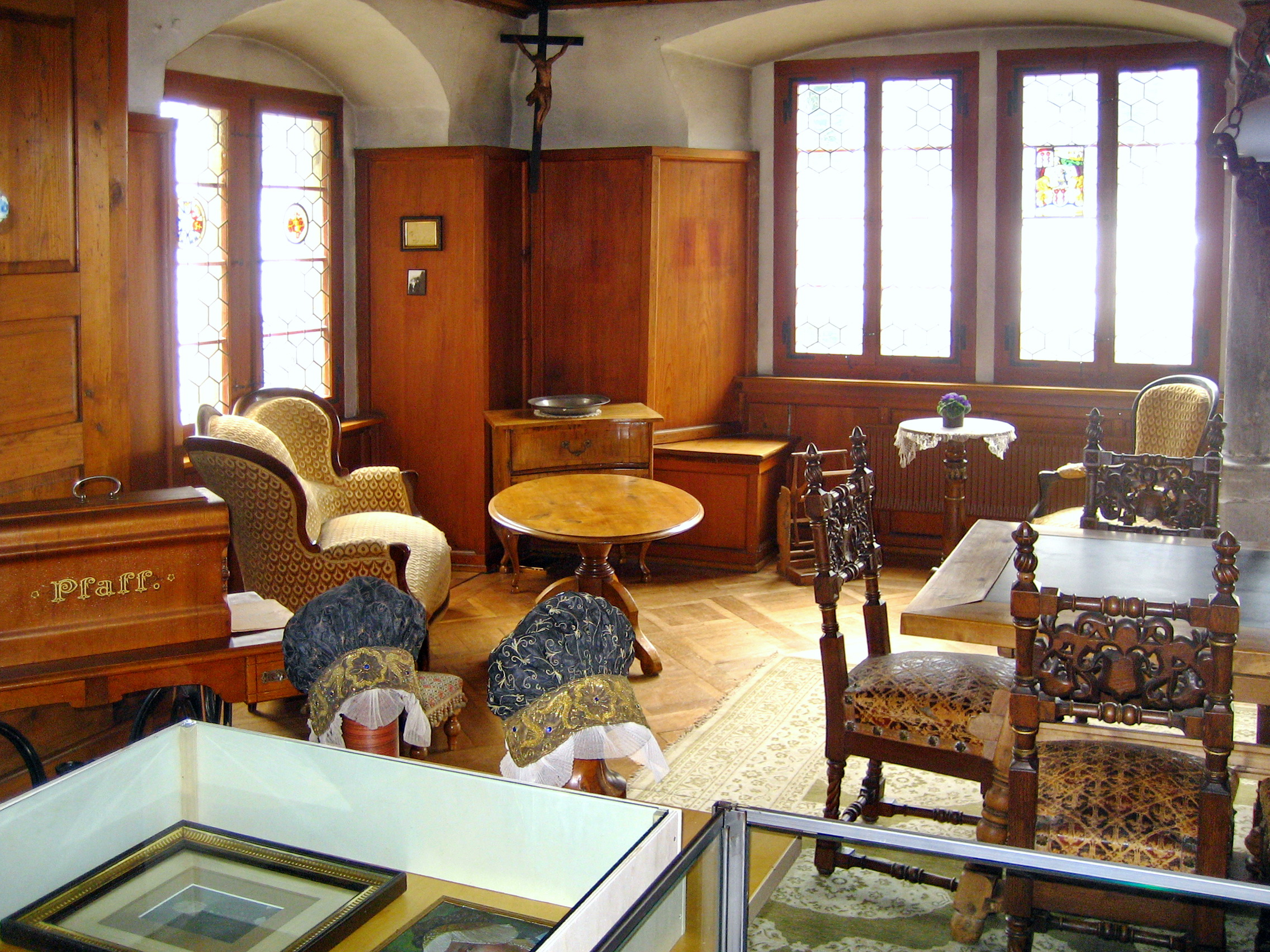
interior of the Breny tower

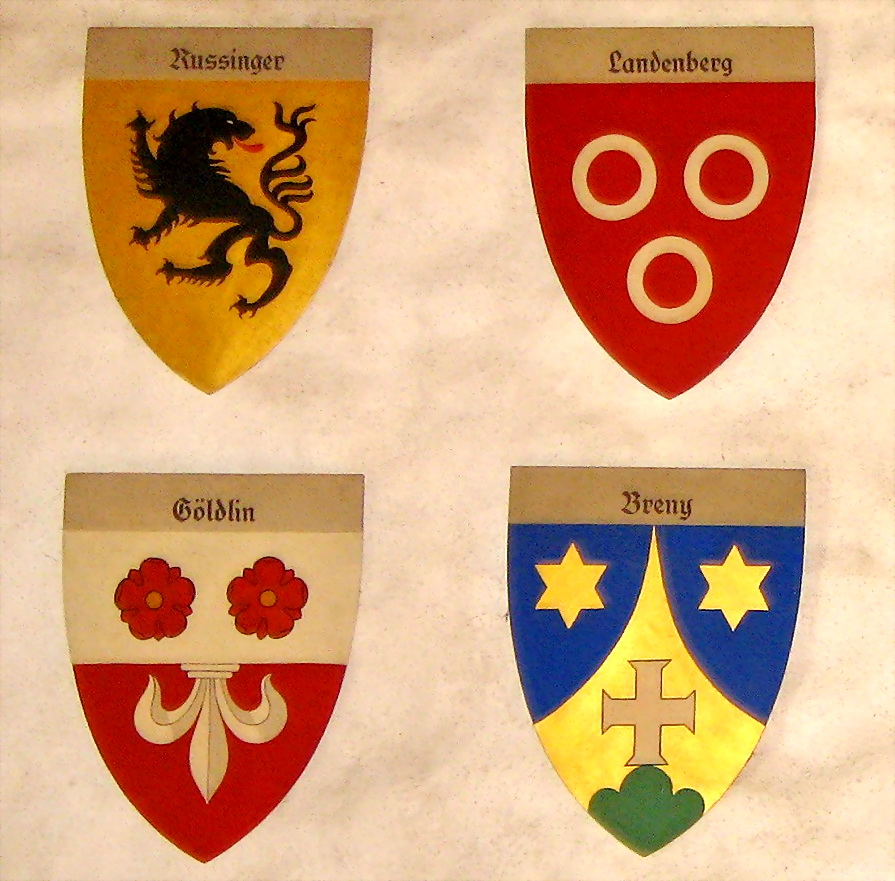
Coats of arms in the entrance hall: Lords of Russikon, of Landenberg, Göldlin and Breny

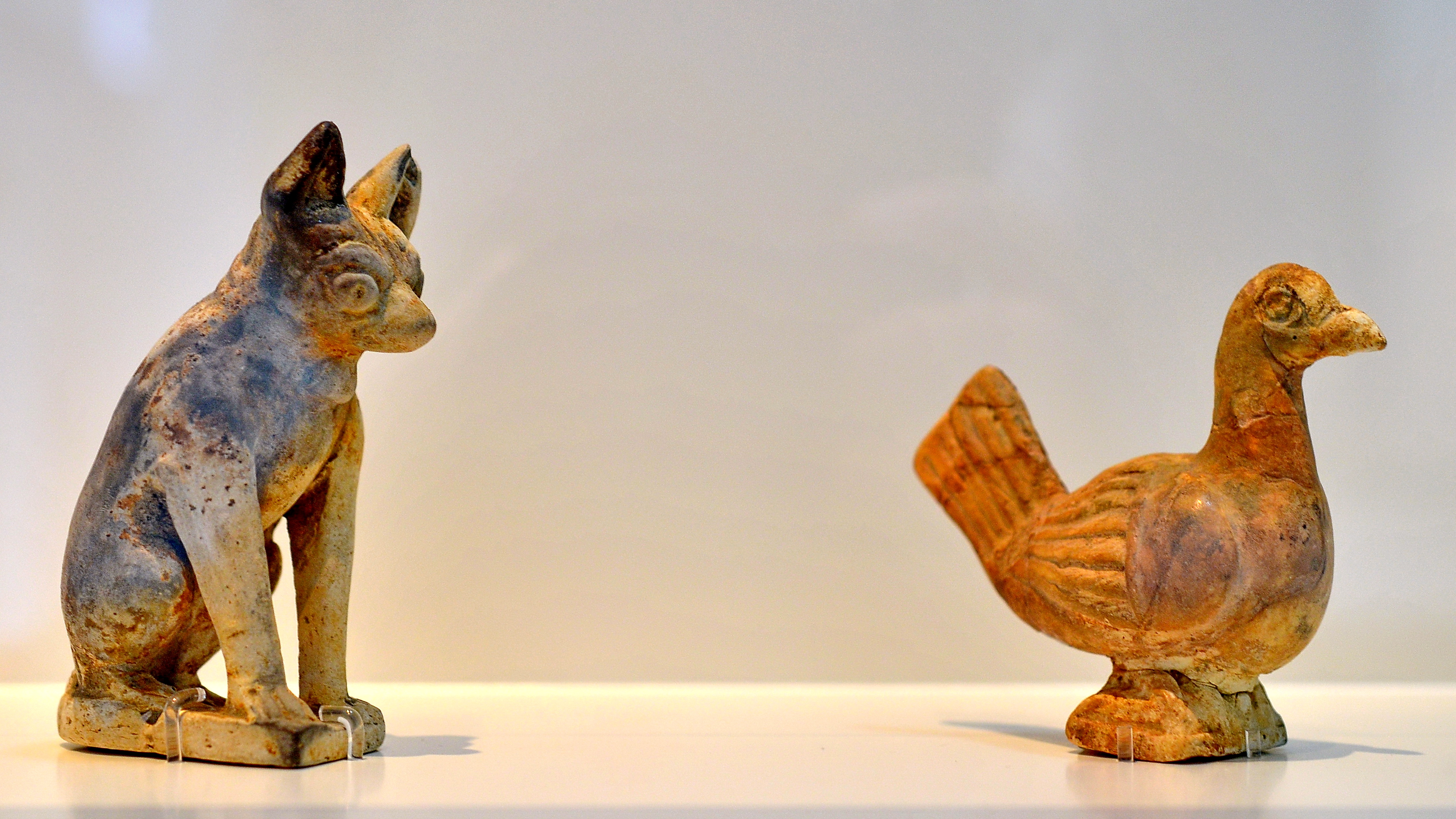
Gallo-Roman relicts from Centum Prata (Kempraten)

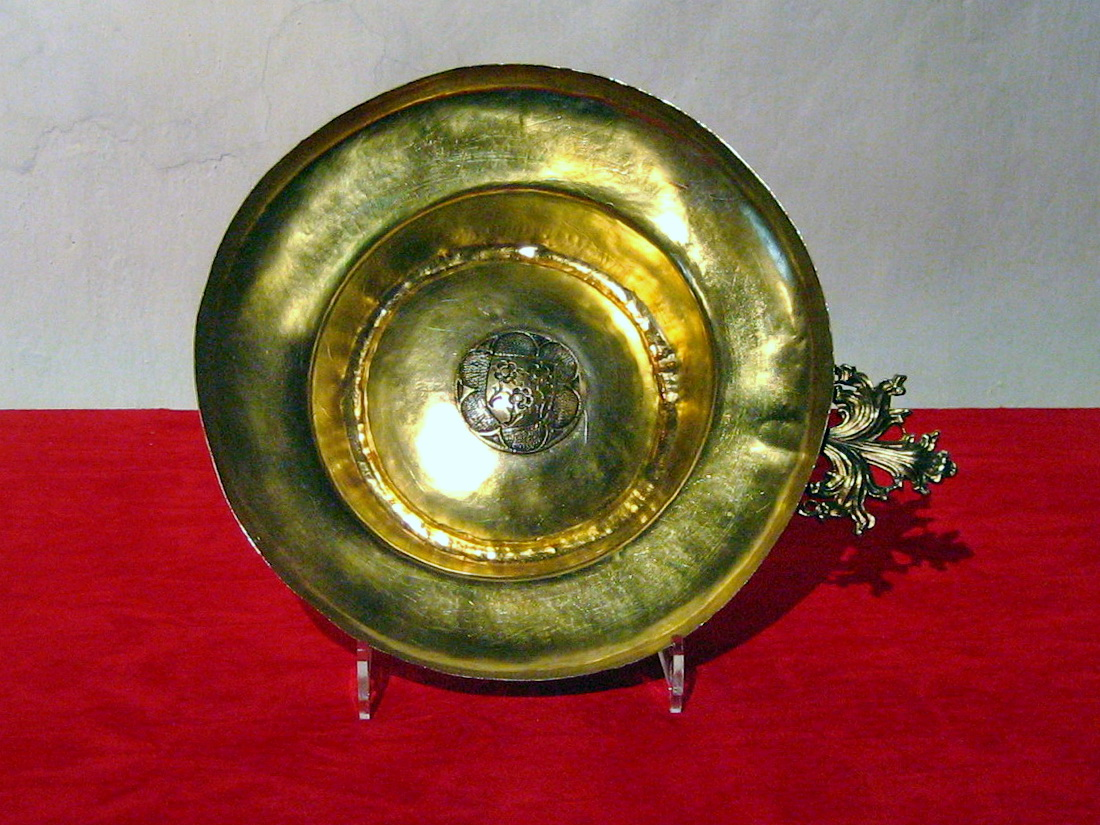
Drinking cup estimated to belong to Countess Elisabeth von Rapperswil (around 1300)

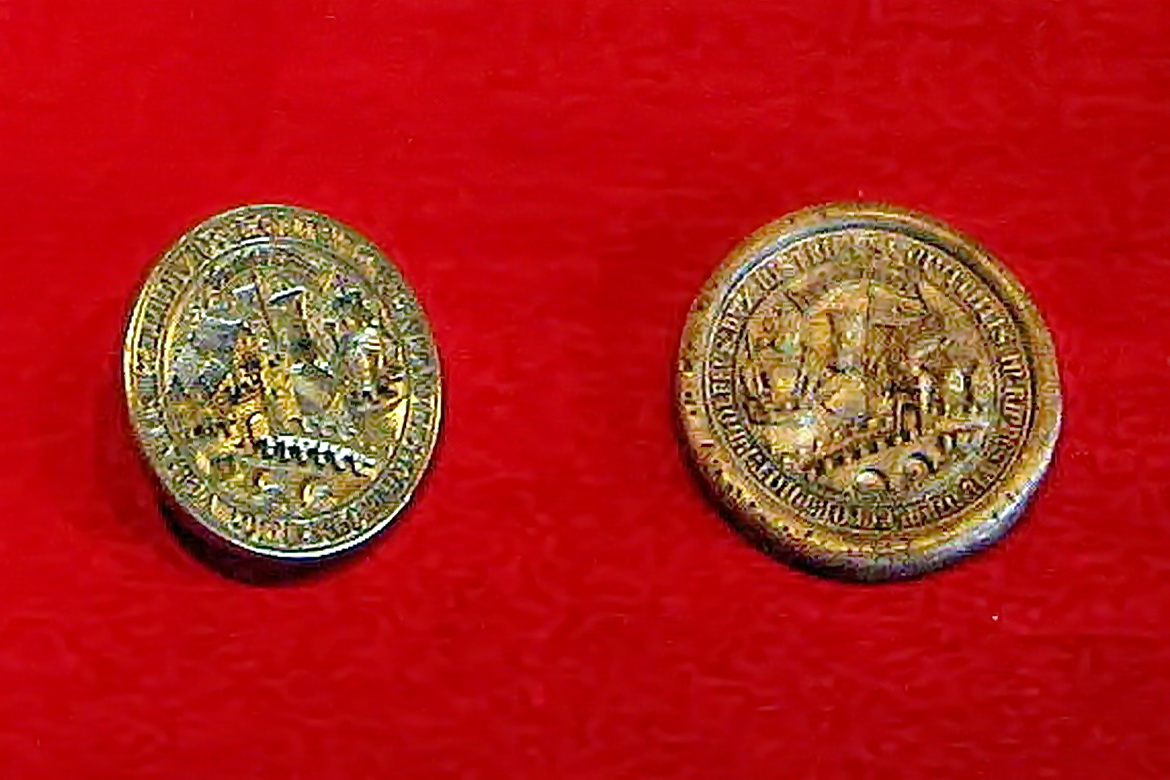
City seal of Rudolf IV, Duke of Austria, showing Rapperswil and Holzbrücke Rapperswil-Hurden (1361)

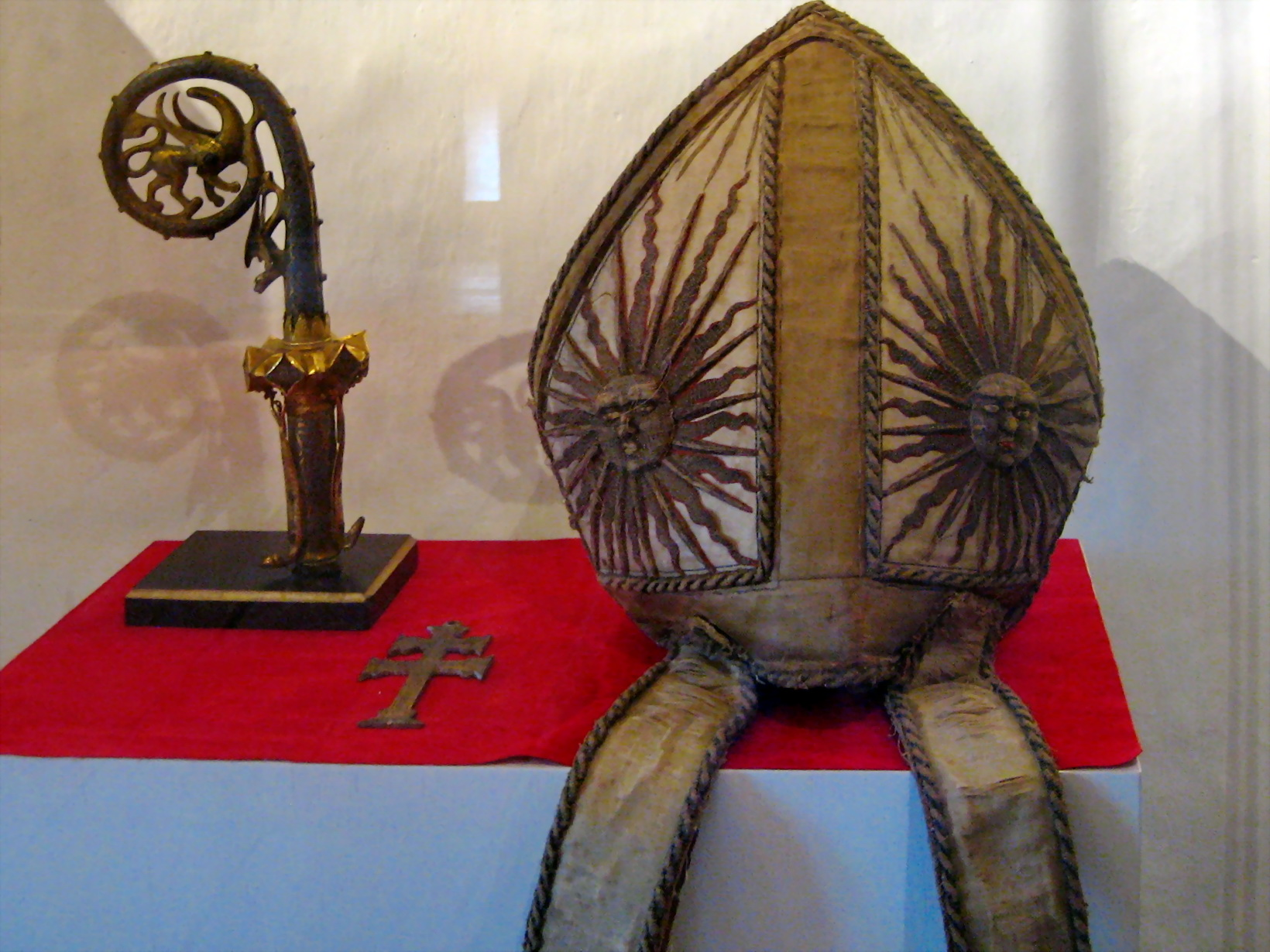
Treasury of the Rüti Abbey

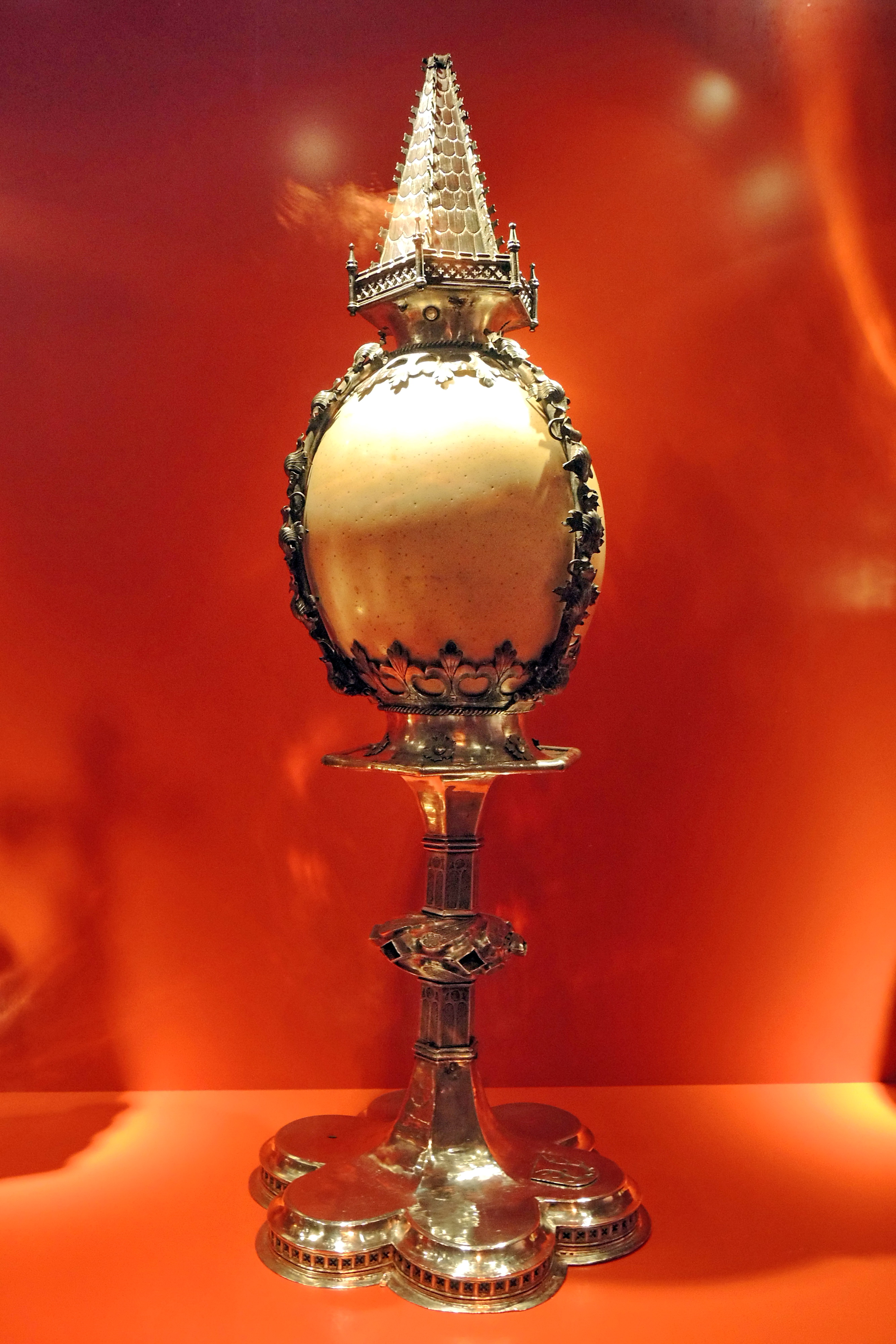
Reliquiar estimated to be given by Elisabeth von Mätsch, wife of Count Friedrich VII of Toggenburg

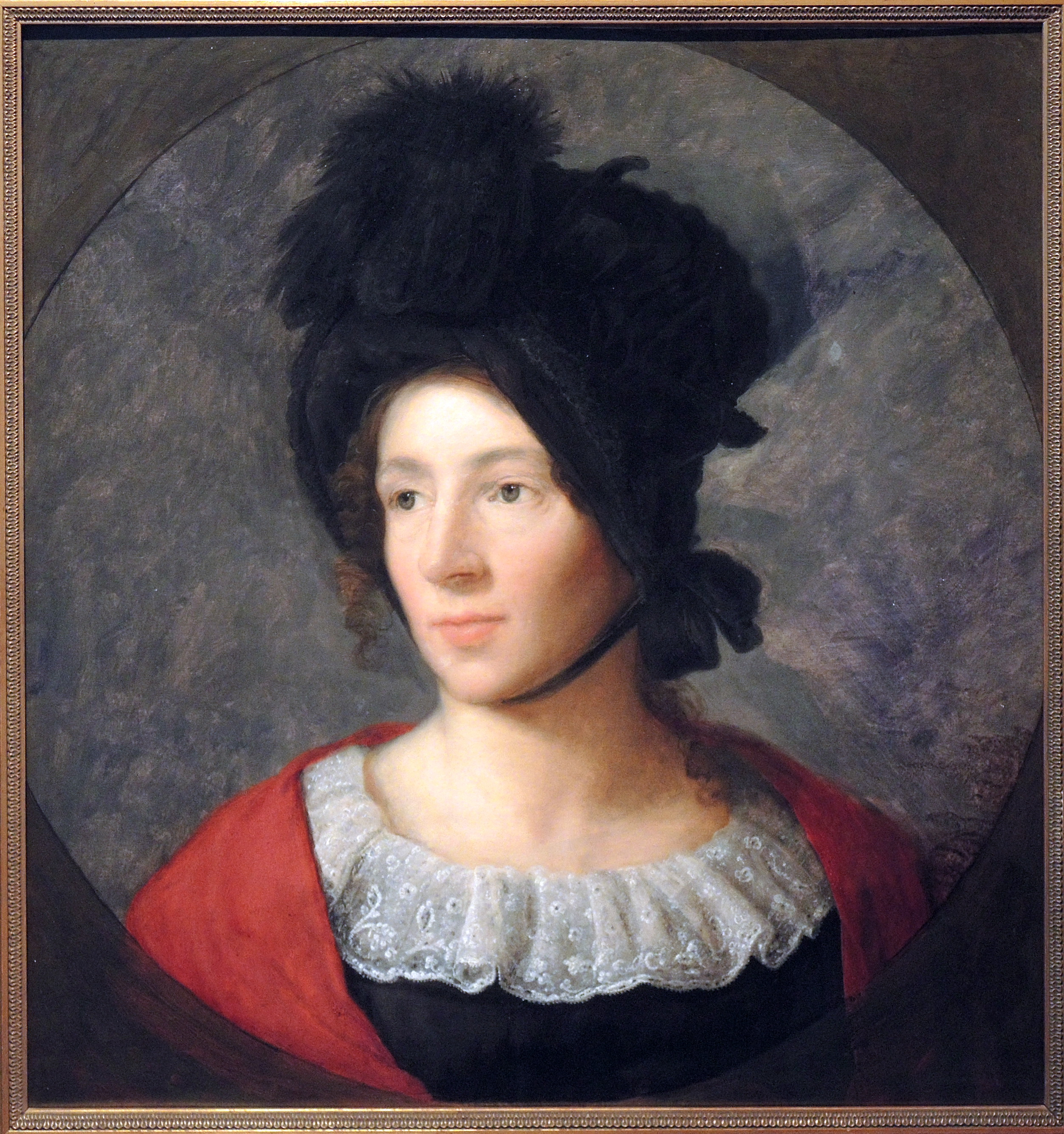
Maria Franziska Diogg (1793-1855), daughter of Felix Maria Diogg, oil on canvas around 1814

== Cultural heritage ==
The building is listed in the Swiss inventory of cultural property of national and regional significance as a Class B object of regional importance.

== See also ==
- List of museums in Switzerland
- Rathaus Rapperswil
- Rüti Abbey

== Literature ==
- Peter Röllin: Kulturbaukasten Rapperswil-Jona. Rapperswil-Jona 2005. ISBN 3-033-00478-4
