= Castels Castle, Luzein =

Castle in Switzerland

Castels Castle
- Putzerburg
- Luzein
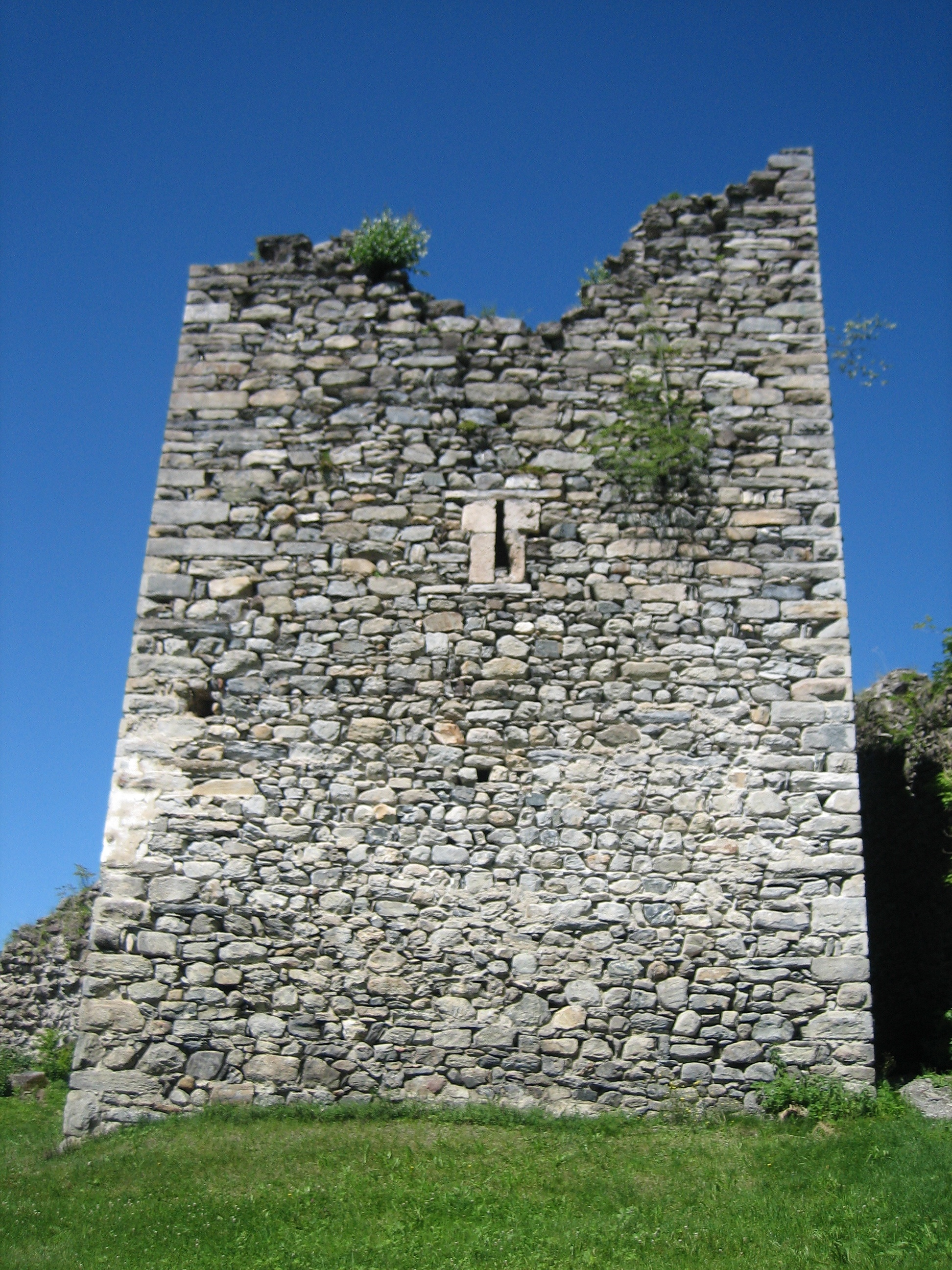
- Ruins of Castels Castle

Site information
- Type: hill castle
- Code: CH-GR
- Condition: ruin

Location
- Coordinates: 46°55′29″N 9°44′42″E
- Height: 1,065 m above the sea

Site history
- Built: 13th century

Swiss Cultural Property of National Significance

Castels Castle is a castle in the municipality of Luzein of the Canton of Graubünden in Switzerland. It is a Swiss heritage site of national significance.

== History ==
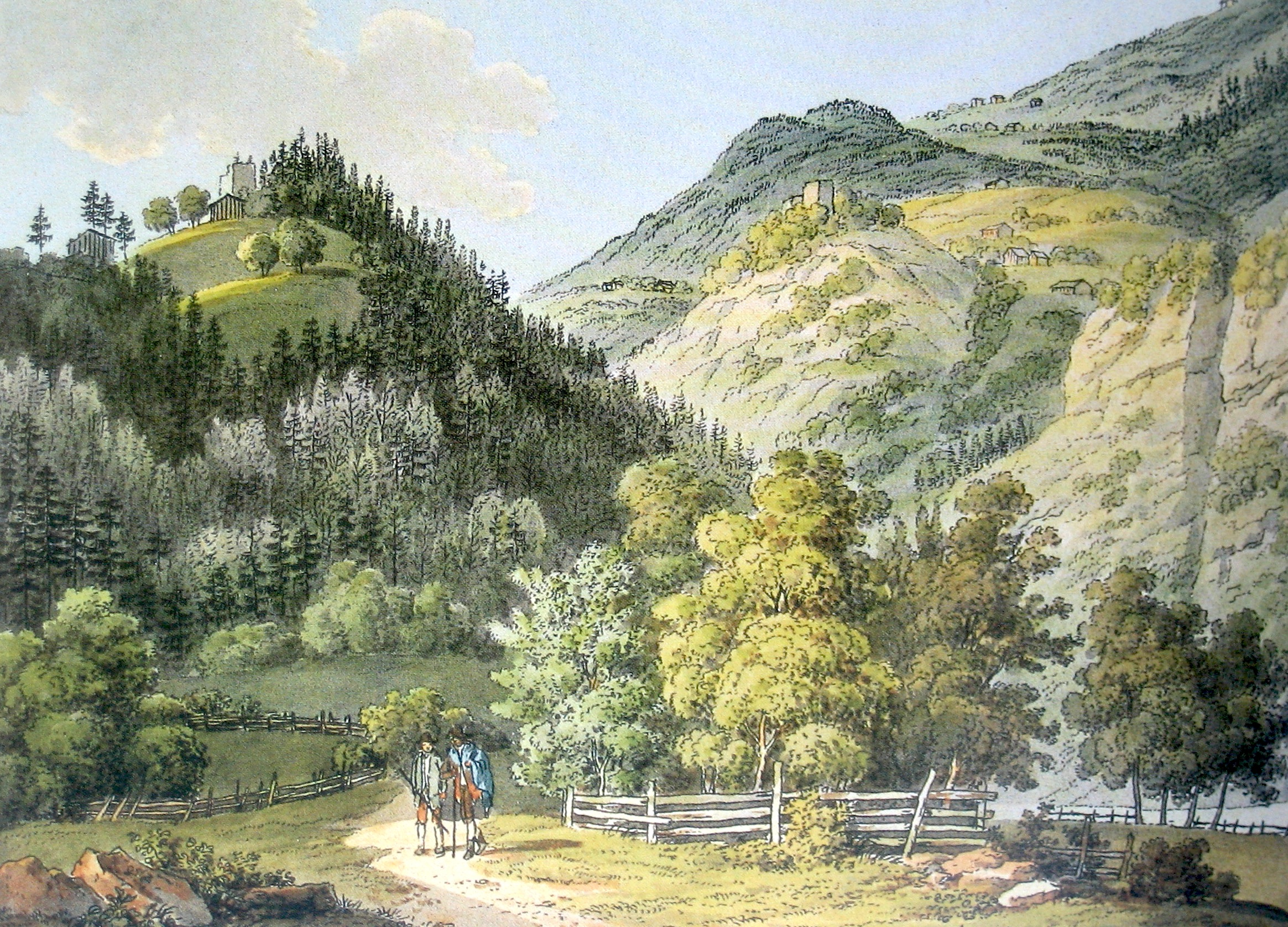
Strahlegg Castle (left) and ruins of Castels Castle (right) in 1799

Nothing is known about the early history of the castle. Initially it may have been a refuge castle or a fortified church built during the Middle Ages. The oldest part of the ring wall was probably built during the 12th century. At some point in the High Middle Ages, it became the home of a noble family. By the early 14th century it was the administrative center of all the Aspermont estates in Upper Prättigau. The Lower Prättigau was controlled from Solavers Castle. In 1338 both castles and estates were sold to Count Friedrich V von Toggenburg and the knight Ulrich von Matsch. They divided the two estates between themselves in 1344, with the Matsch family taking Castels. However, by 1400 Castels was back in Toggenburg hands. When the last Count of Toggenburg, Frederick VII died in 1436, the castle returned to the Matsch family through his wife Elisabeth von Matsch.

Over the following years, Matsch family often had to pledge the castle to secure loans. By the end of the 15th century, their financial situation had become so dire that Gaudenz von Matsch sold Castels to Emperor Maximilian I von Habsburg. The League of the Ten Jurisdictions was very concerned about a Habsburg stronghold in their territory. During the Swabian War, on 16 or 17 February 1499, League troops captured the castle and forced the inhabitants to swear loyalty to the League. The Basel peace treaty in September 1499 returned the castle to the Habsburgs and by November an Austrian vogt was once again resident in the castle. However, to avoid conflicts with the League, most of the vogts were local Graubünden nobles instead of Austrian.

For the next century and a half, the castle remained the center of a Habsburg territory in Graubünden. In 1622 the inhabitants of the Prättigau region revolted against Austria. They besieged Castels in April 1622, capturing it on the 25th of the same month. The castle was partly destroyed and probably abandoned. In September 1622 Count Sulz recaptured the castle for Austria and in the Lindau peace treaty of 6 September 1622 the Prättigau was required to repair the damage to the castle. Whether they ever did is unclear, but in 1649 they bought their independence from Austria and demolished Castels Castle.

== Castle site ==
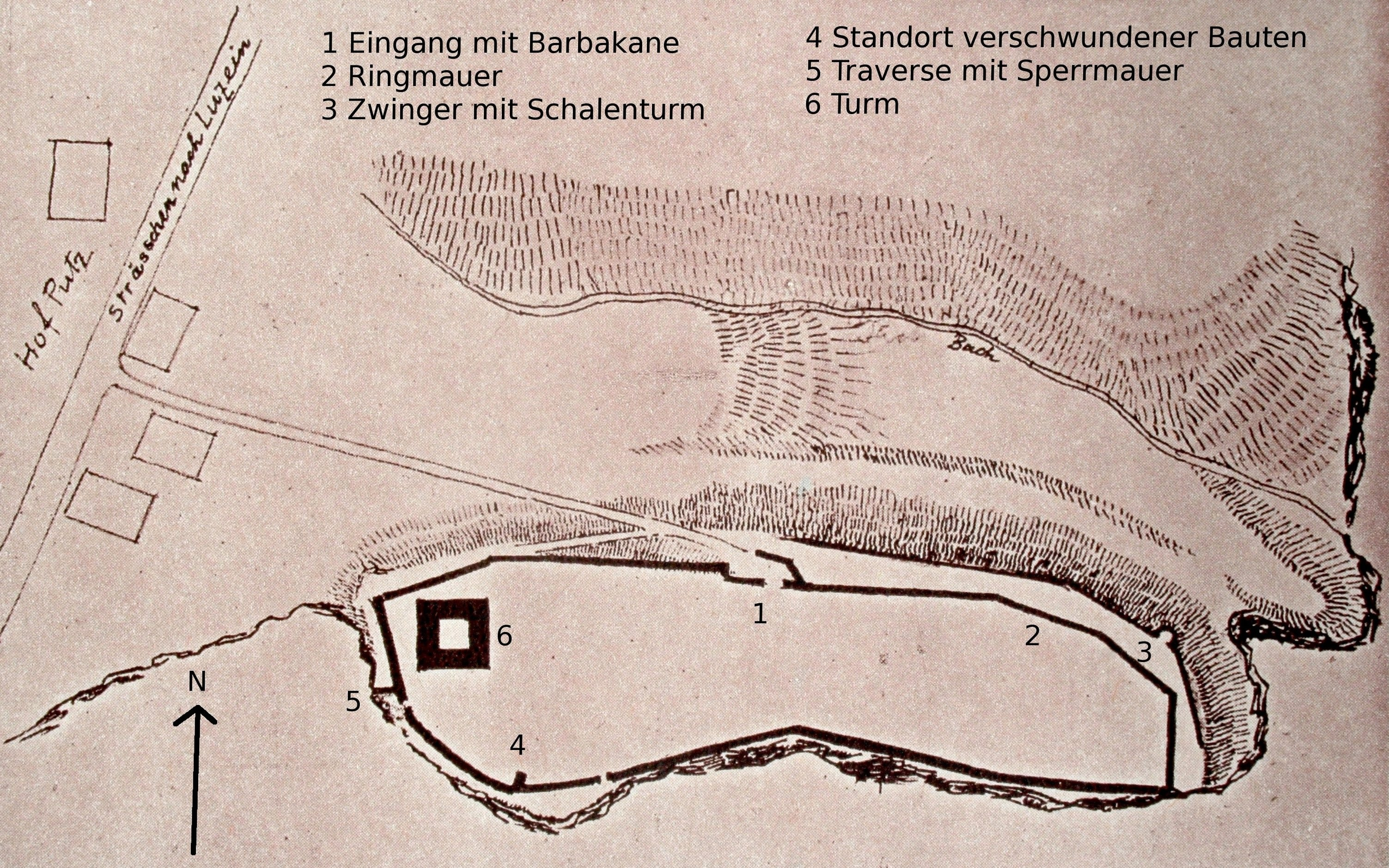
Castle site

The ruins of Castels Castle are on rocky hilltop near the village of Putz. The castle site is protected on the south side by a sheer cliff. The north or village side was protected by a ditch which is still visible. The oldest part of the castle are portions of the ring wall which were built in the 12th and 13th centuries. They were repaired and possibly expanded in the 14th or 15th century. Another construction phase in the 16th or 17th century added a 5 meters (16 ft) wide zwinger and outer wall with a half-round tower. The main entrance was in the northern section of the wall. In the 15th or 16th century it was probably reinforced with a barbican and wall. The barbican and outer tower included firing slits for firearms or small cannons.

The main tower stands about 2 m (6.6 ft) from the ring wall. It is a square tower of about 8.5 m × 8.5 m (28 ft × 28 ft) and at least four stories tall. The original high entrance was on the second story on the west side. A residence wing was built on the south-west side of the complex.

In 1616 an exhaustive inventory of the castle was taken. It records that in the 17th century, the residence wing had become a richly outfitted, two-story palas. It also included a chapel, granary and wine cellar. The buildings in the courtyard included a well, stables, a laundry and a heated bath house. The tower was used as a prison and a powder magazine.

== Gallery ==
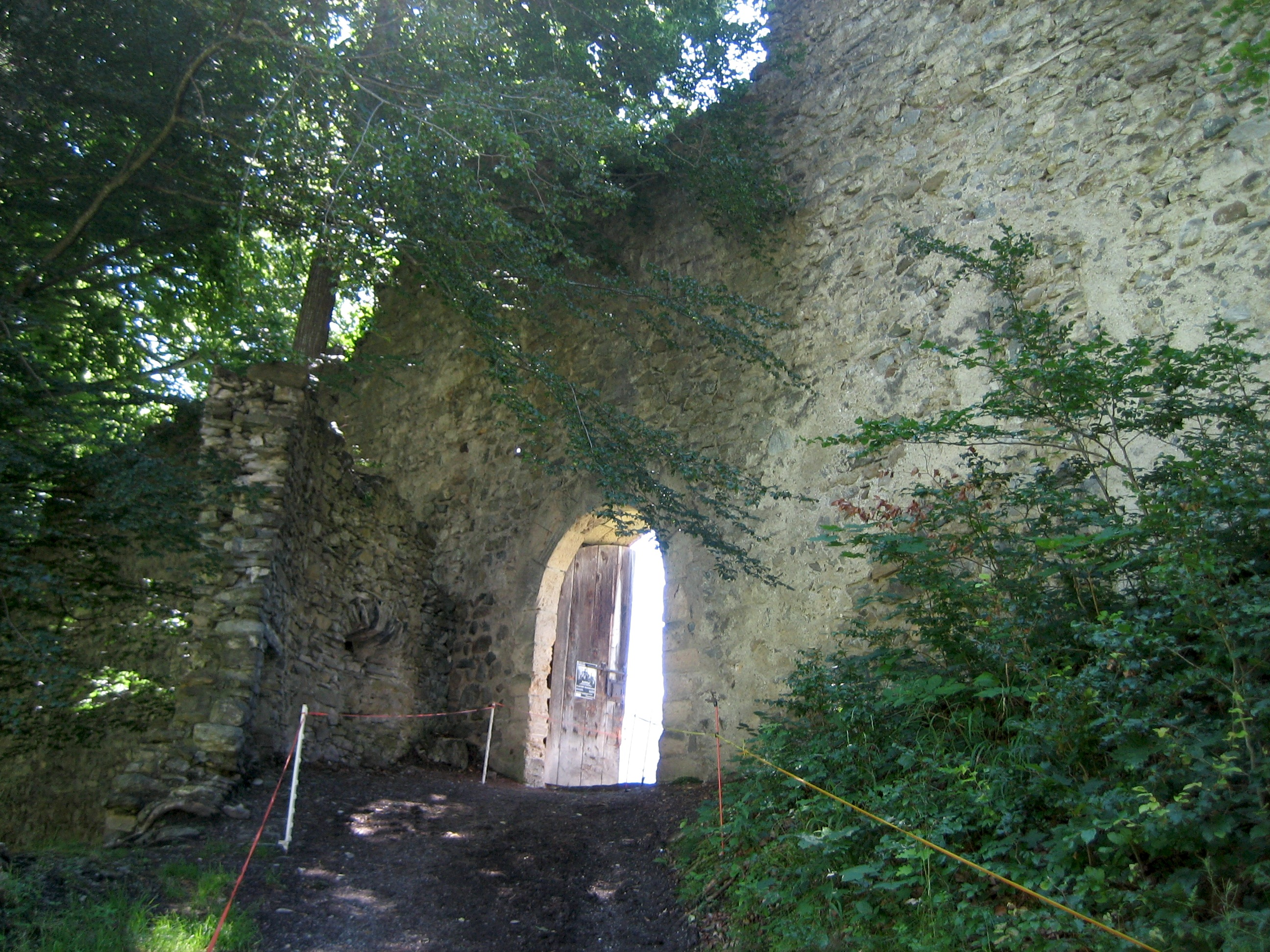
Entrance, to the left-ruins of the barbican

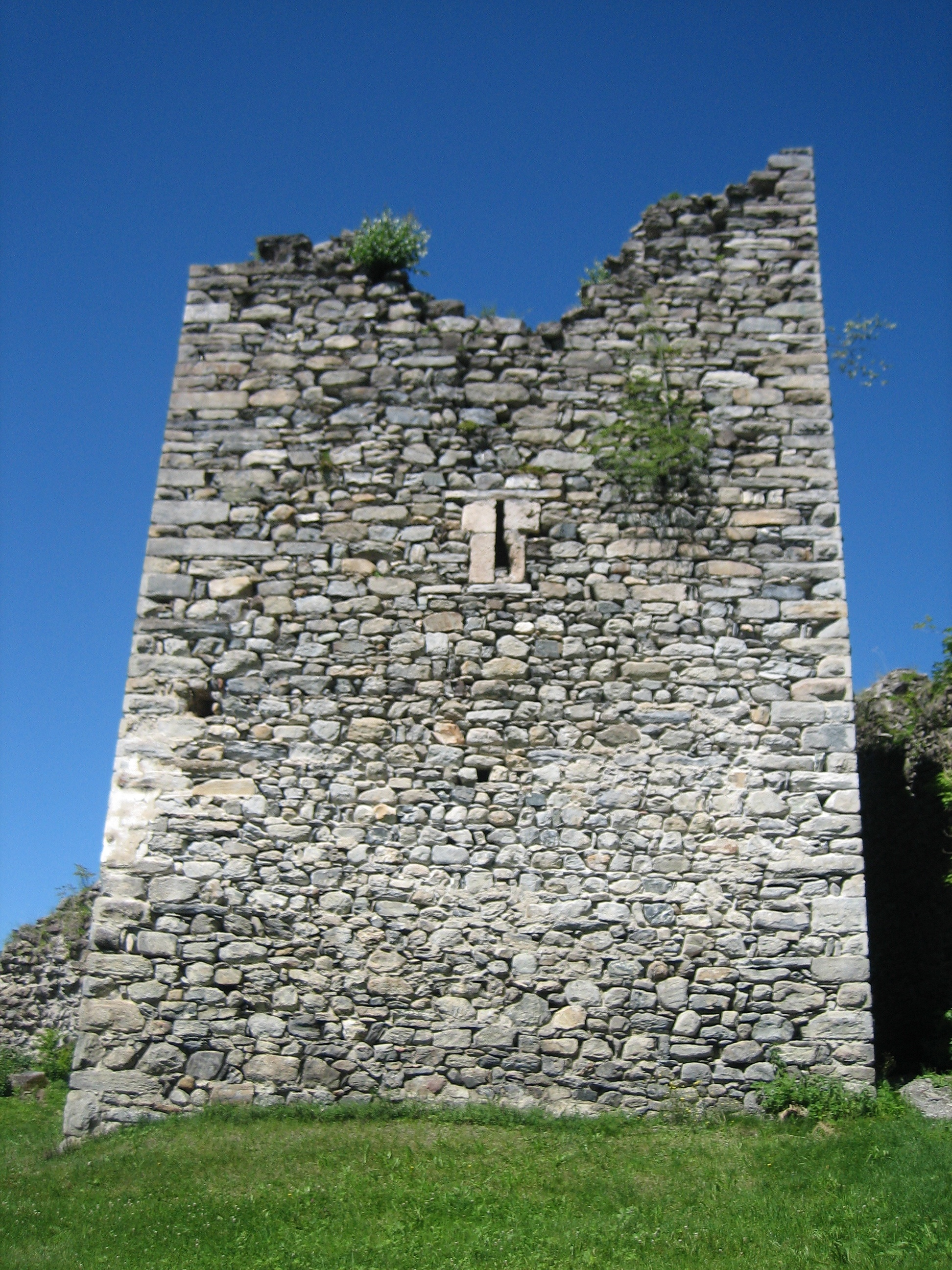
East side of the tower

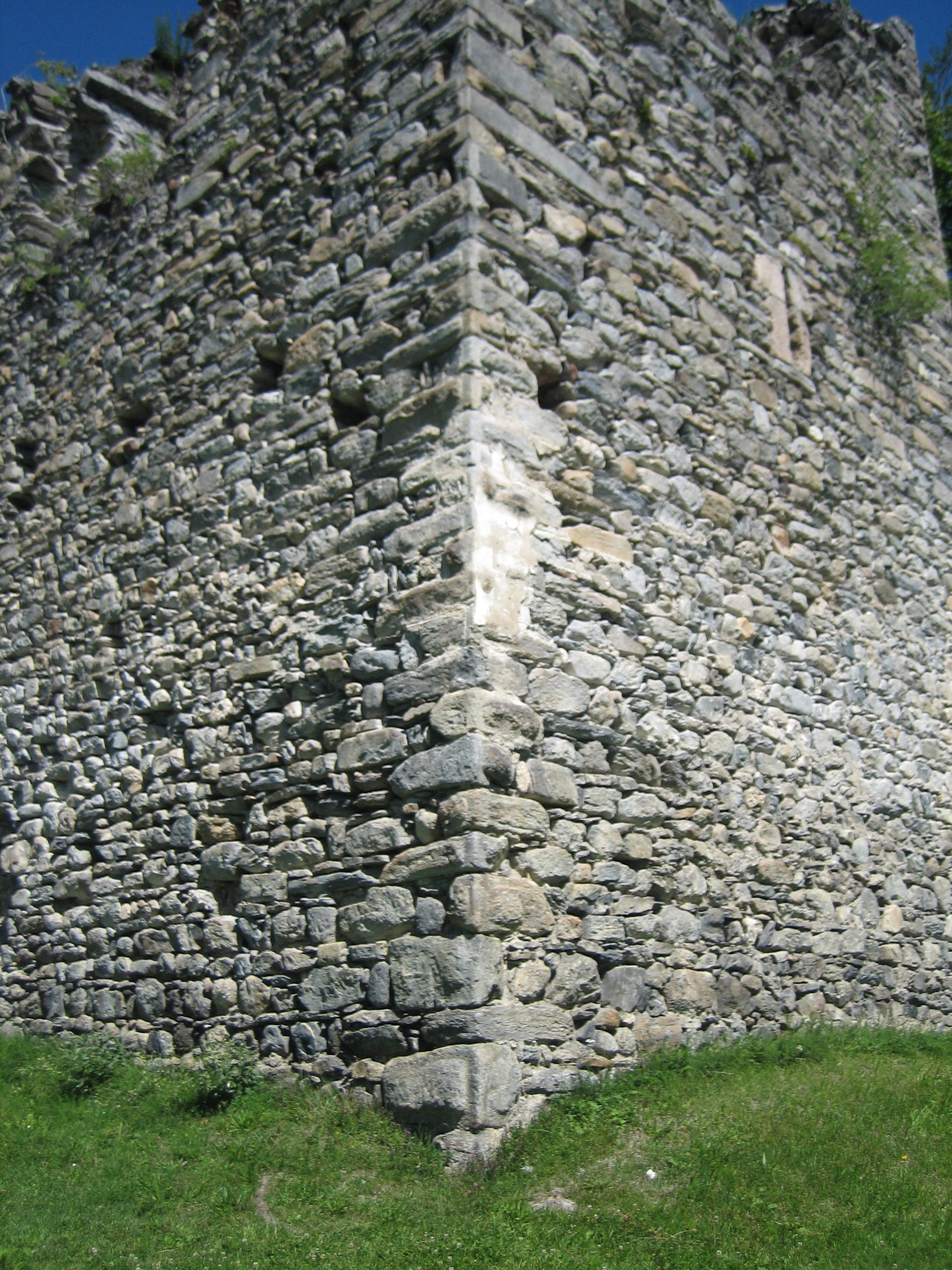
South-east corner

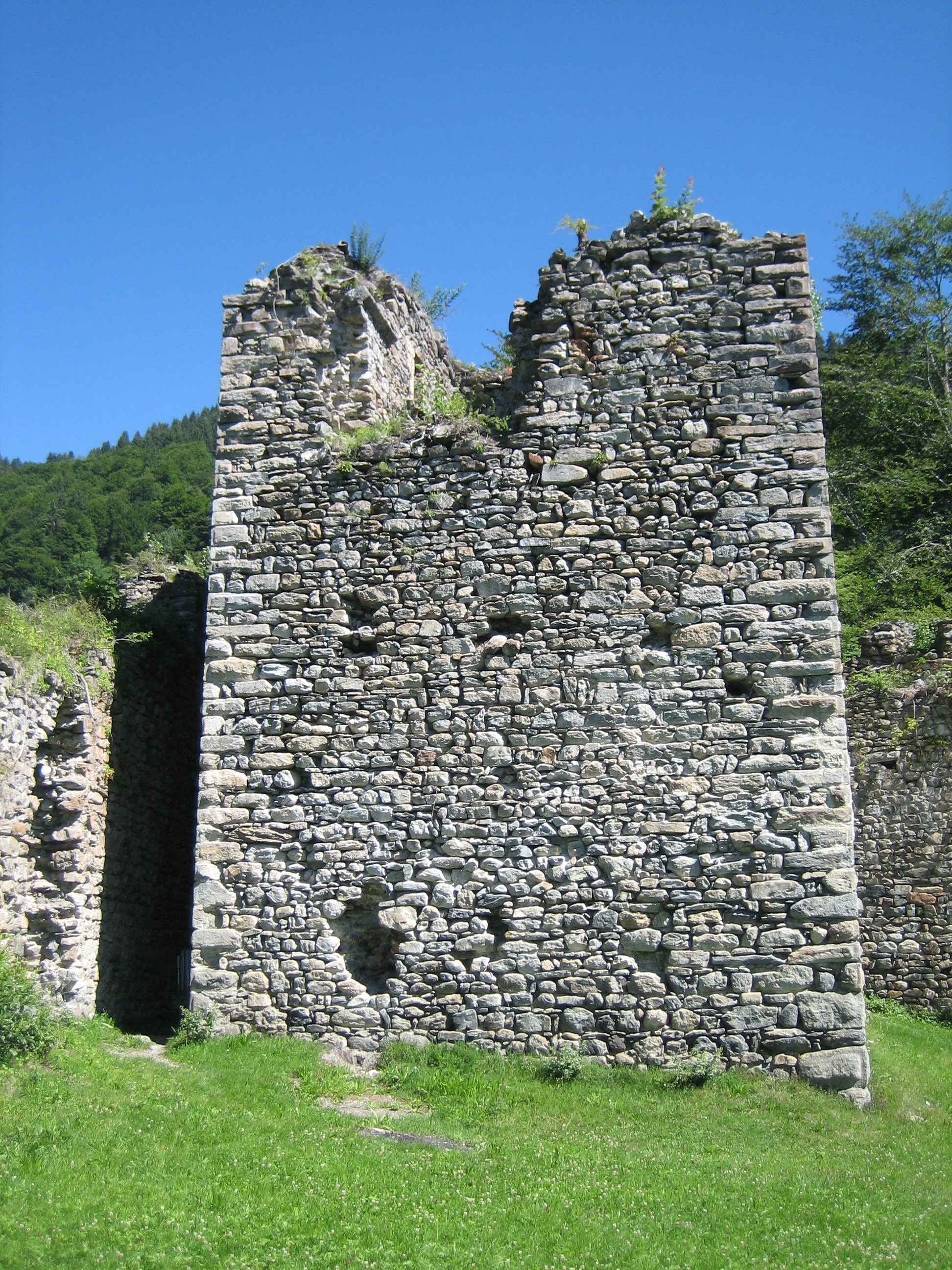
Southside of the tower

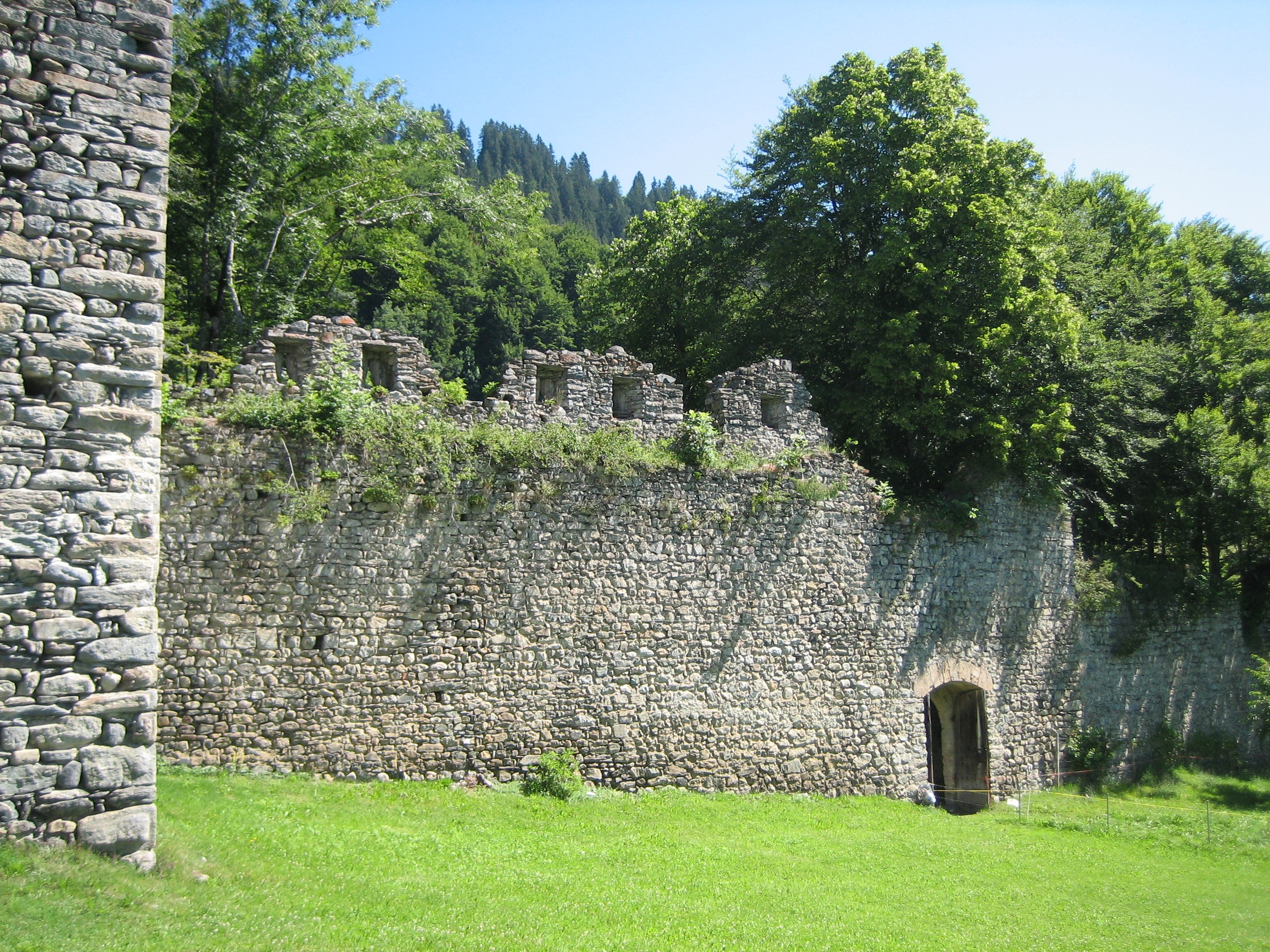
Main gate from the inside

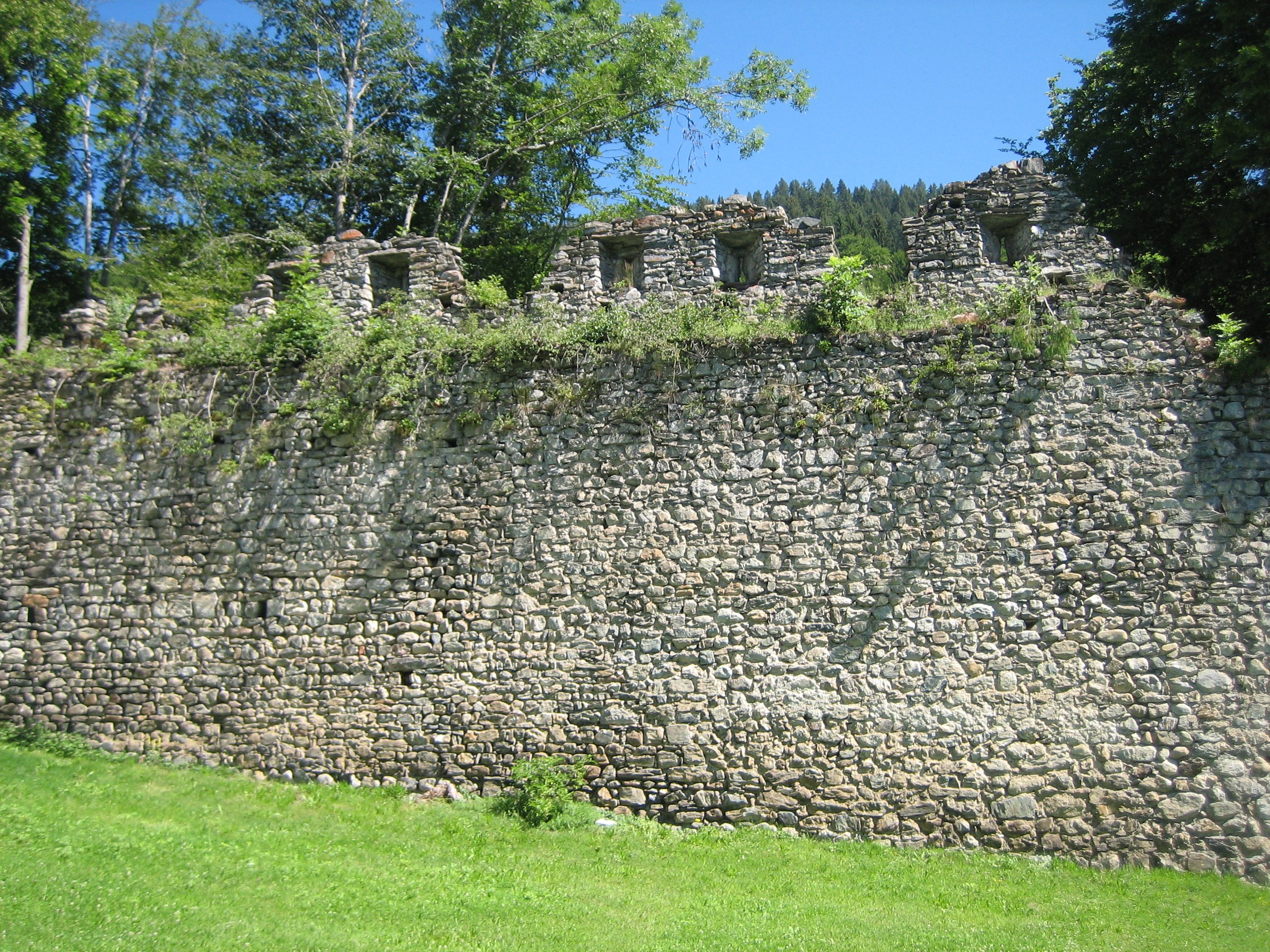
North wall

== See also ==
- List of castles in Switzerland
