= Solavers Castle =

Castle in Switzerland

- Seewis
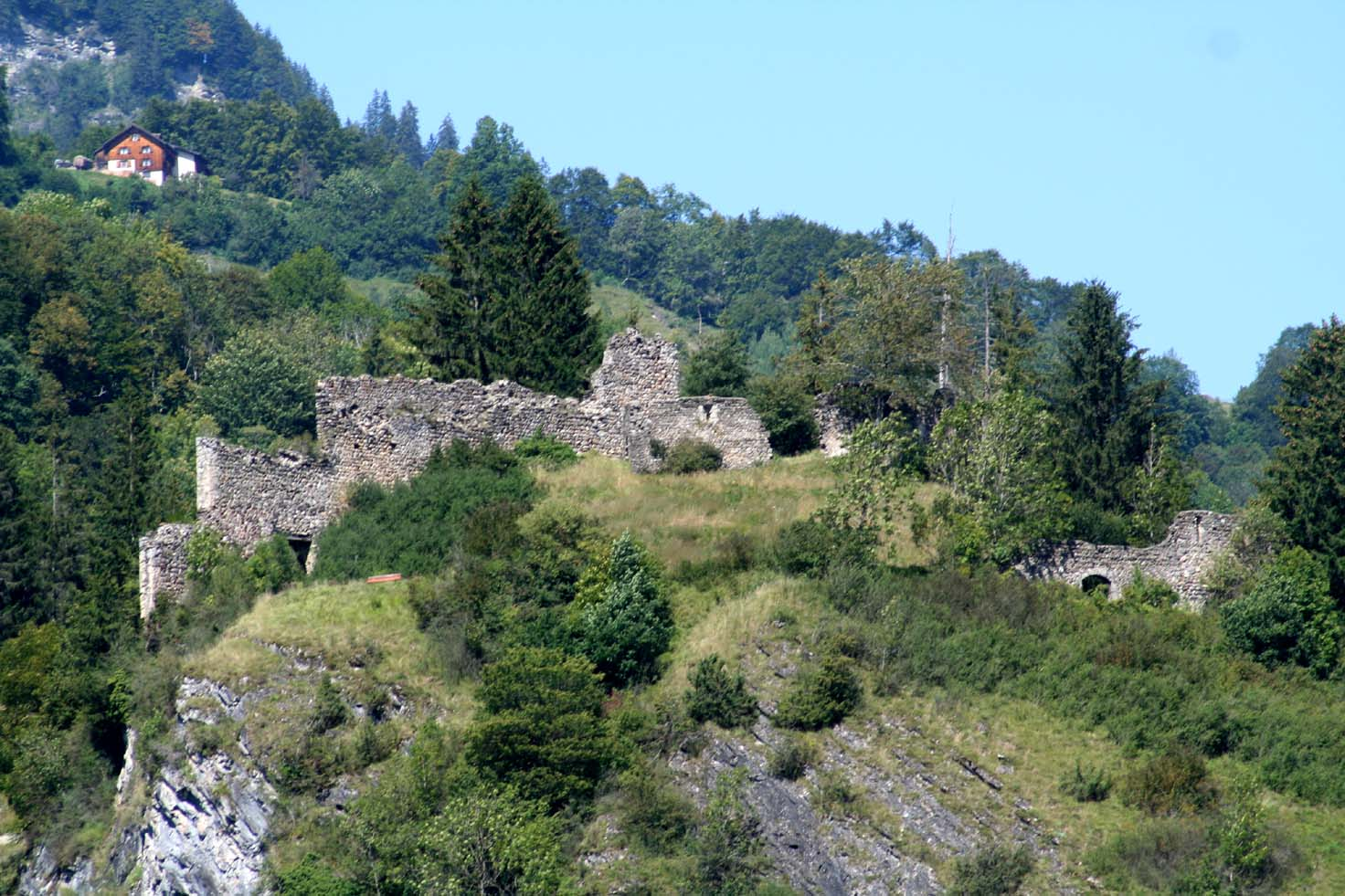
- Ruins of Solavers Castle

Site information
- Type: hill castle
- Code: CH-GR
- Condition: ruin

Location
- Coordinates: 46°59′00″N 9°38′39″E
- Height: 1,058 m above the sea

Site history
- Built: 11th century

Solavers Castle is a castle in the municipality of Seewis im Prättigau of the Canton of Graubünden in Switzerland.

== History ==
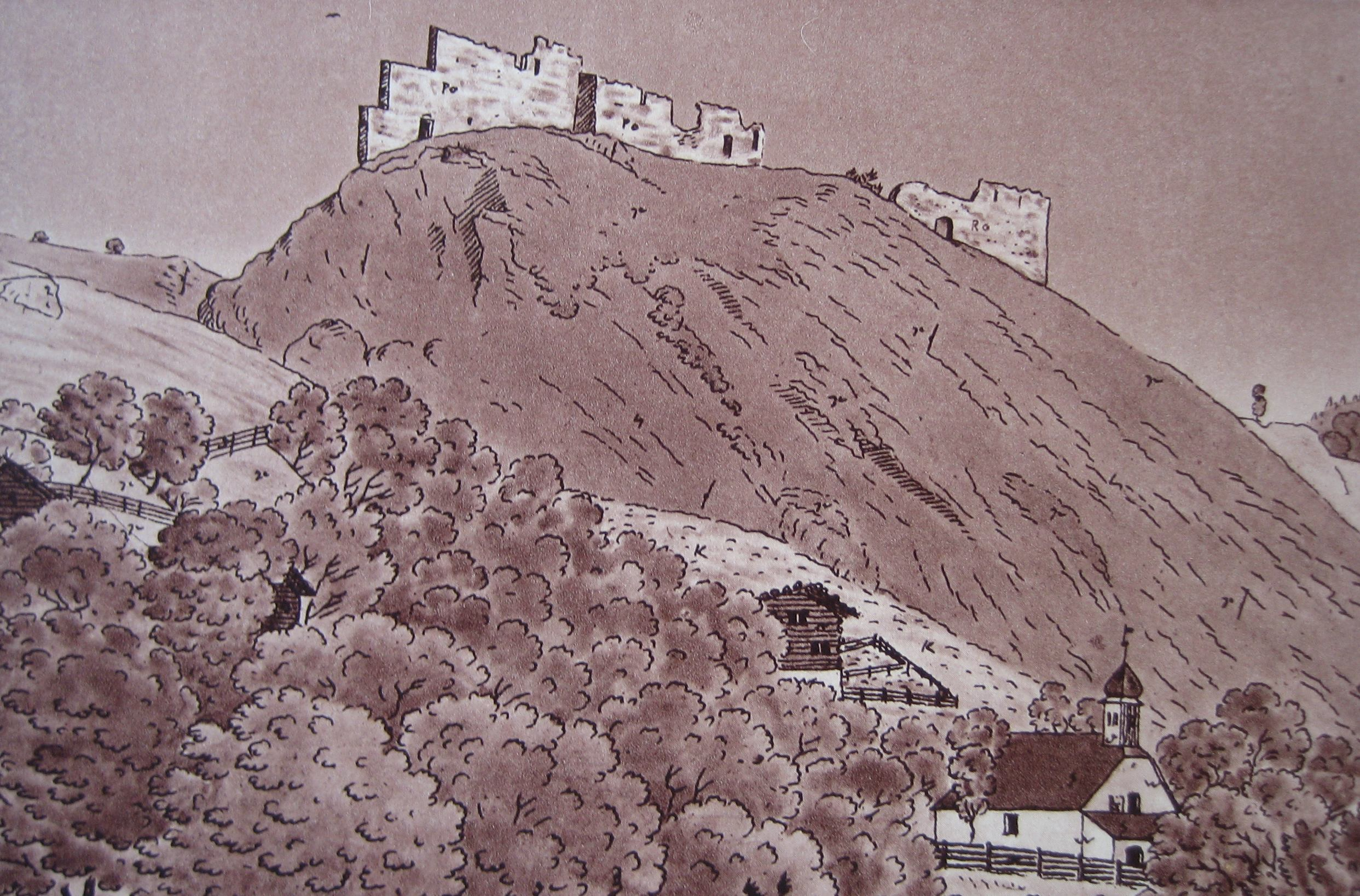
Solavers Castle in the early 19th century

Solavers Castle was originally built as a fortified church probably during the Early Middle Ages. The church of the Blessed Virgin was the parish church for the villages of Seewis and Fanas. Originally, the church was protected on the north-west side by a 60 meters (200 ft) long curtain wall and on the other sides by the steep hillside. This wall was modified often during the following centuries. The original gate in the center of the wall was sealed up and a new gate built further from the church at some point.

Possibility as early as the 11th century the fortified church and refuge castle became a nobleman's castle. In the 11th or 12th century a square tower was built on the southern side of the hill top. Nothing is known about the first noblemen at Solavers. In the 13th century, the castle was acquired by the Lords of Aspermont. They controlled the lower Prättigau valley from Solavers and the upper valley from Castels Castle in Luzein. By the early 14th century the Aspermont family was in financial difficulties and in 1338 sold the Prättigau valley to the von Matsch family and the Counts of Toggenburg. In 1344 the Matsch and Toggenburg families divided their estates with Toggenburg receiving Solavers. The last count, Frederick VII may have been born at Solavers. His death in 1436, led to the creation of the League of the Ten Jurisdictions which was a confederation of ten communities in the region which sought freedom from foreign overlords. Frederick VII's death also started the Toggenburg War and a long running dispute over the inheritance of the castle.

Perhaps due to the disputed succession and the local residents' hostility to foreign rulers, the castle was abandoned in the mid 15th century. Eventually, the Emperor ruled that Solavers was to be combined with the Herrschaft of Belfort under Wilhelm IV von Montfort and Heinrich von Sax-Misox. Though the castle appears to have been abandoned before the succession was sorted out. Later they sold the territory to Duke Sigismund of Austria, over the objections of the League which opposed the Austrian Habsburgs.

The castle church remained in operation for about a century after the castle was abandoned. In the 15th century the nave was lengthened and a polygonal chancel was added. In 1472 the Church of St. Lawrence in Seewis village became the parish church for the area. However, in 1487 the communities of Seewis and Fanas agreed to continue holding their major church festivals in Solavers. In the 16th century, when the Protestant Reformation took hold in the Prättigau, the church was abandoned.

== Castle site ==
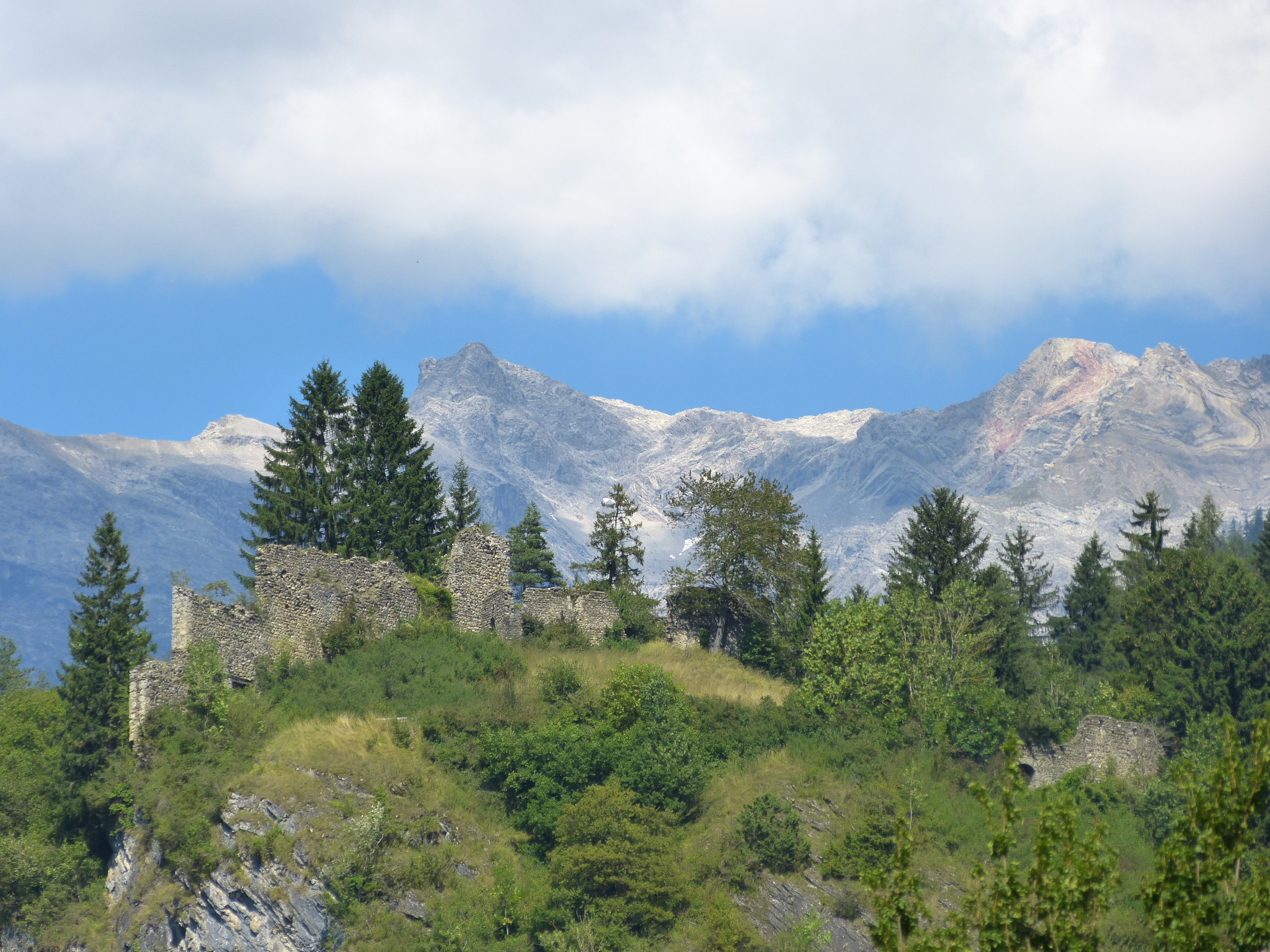
Ruins of Solvares Castle

The church was built on the highest point of a steep hill outside the village of Seewis. A 60 m (200 ft) long curtain wall stretching along the north-west side of the hilltop protected the church. The wall is up to 1.6 m (5.2 ft) thick in the center, tapering down to only 0.6 m (2.0 ft) on the sides. It was built and modified multiple times over the centuries, with several sealed entrances still visible. When the fortified church was converted into a feudal castle, a ring wall was built around the west and southern sides of the hill top along with a tower. The tower, on the south side, was about 12 m × 12 m (39 ft × 39 ft). Next to the castle there was a residence wing. Today only parts of the tower remain along with two pointed arch windows.

The church of the Blessed Virgin was built as a Romanesque building. In the 15th century the nave was extended and a Gothic choir was added. The pointed arch window is well preserved.

== Gallery ==
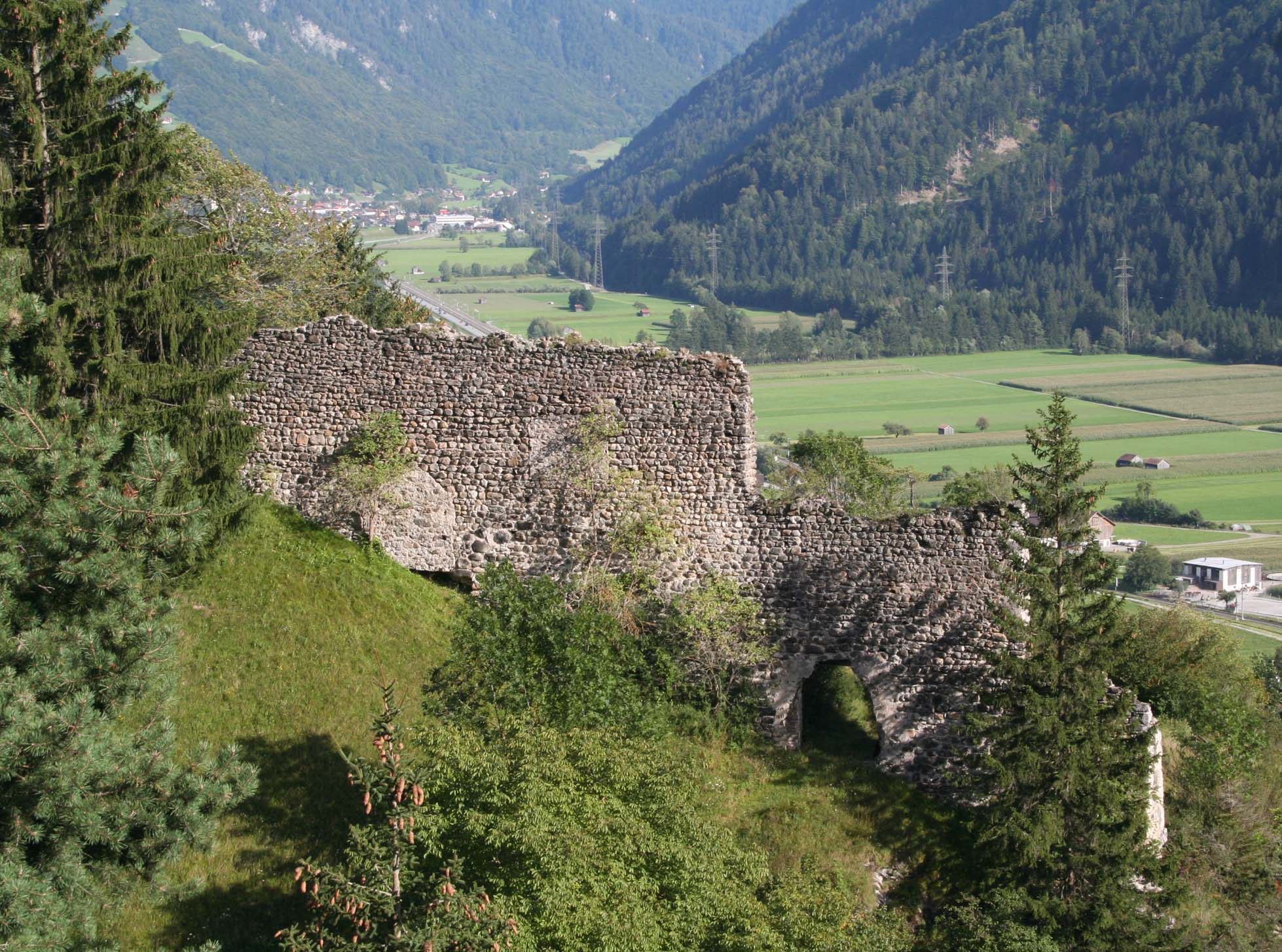
Northern ring wall with former entrance visible

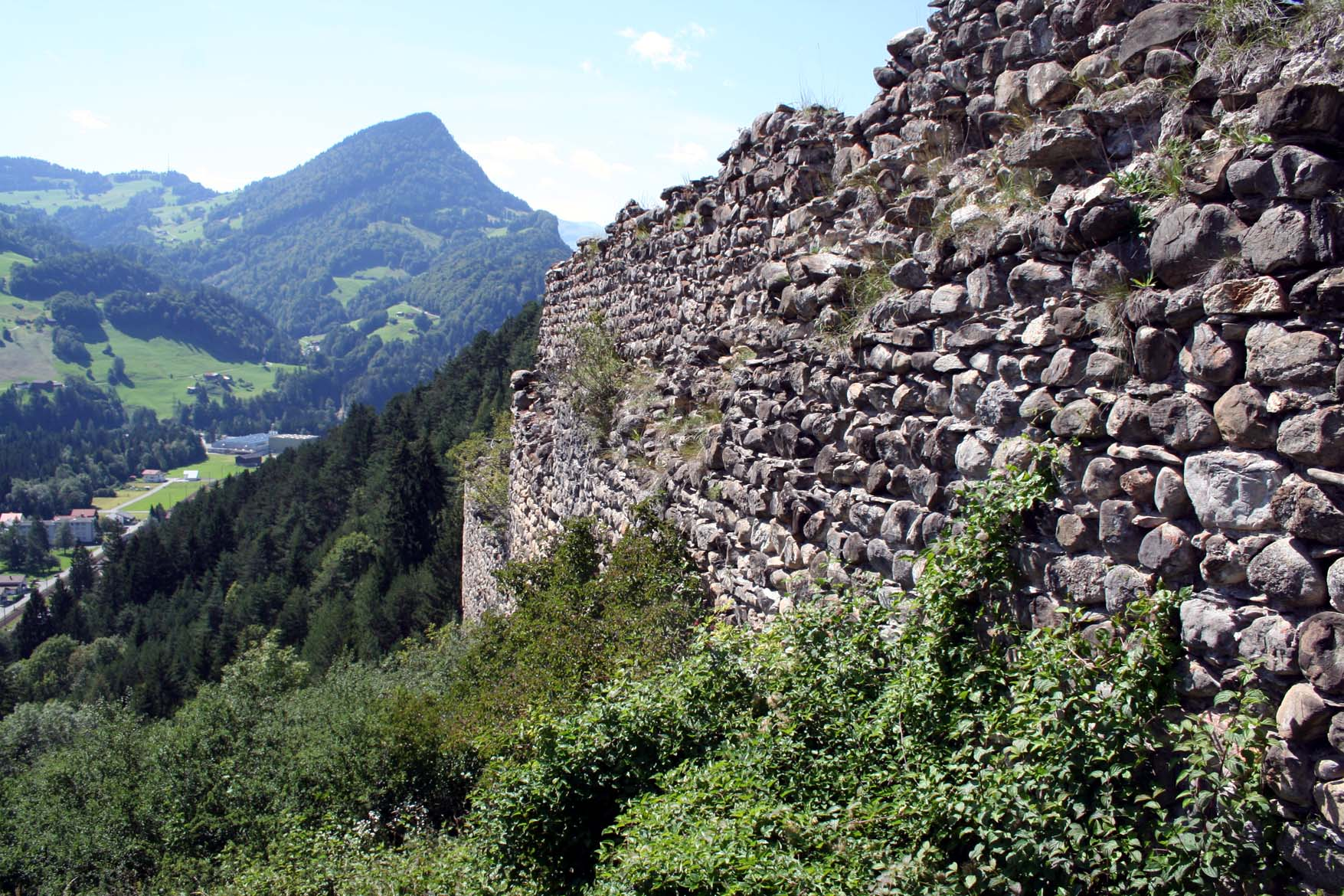
Interior of the ring wall

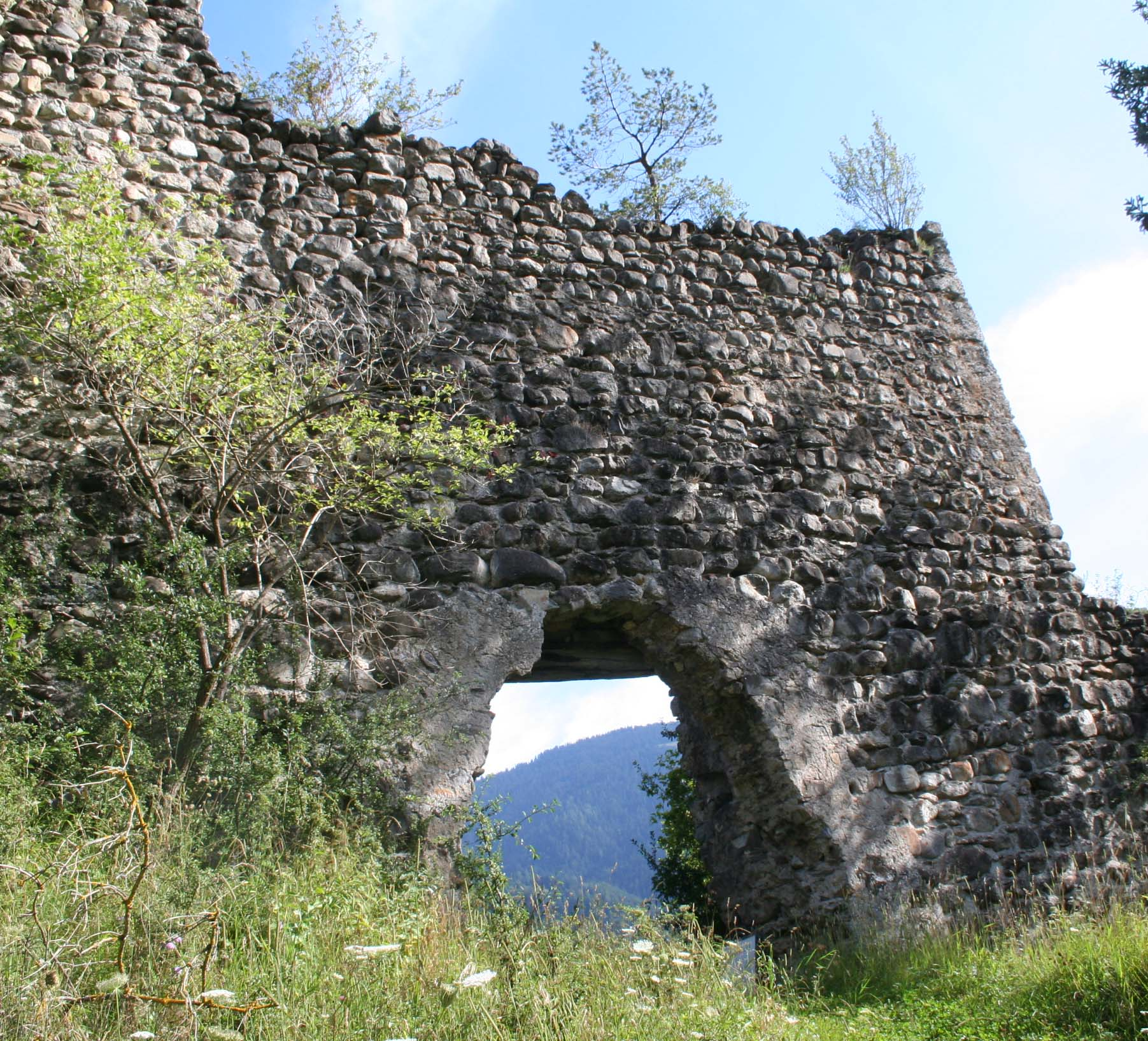
Gate

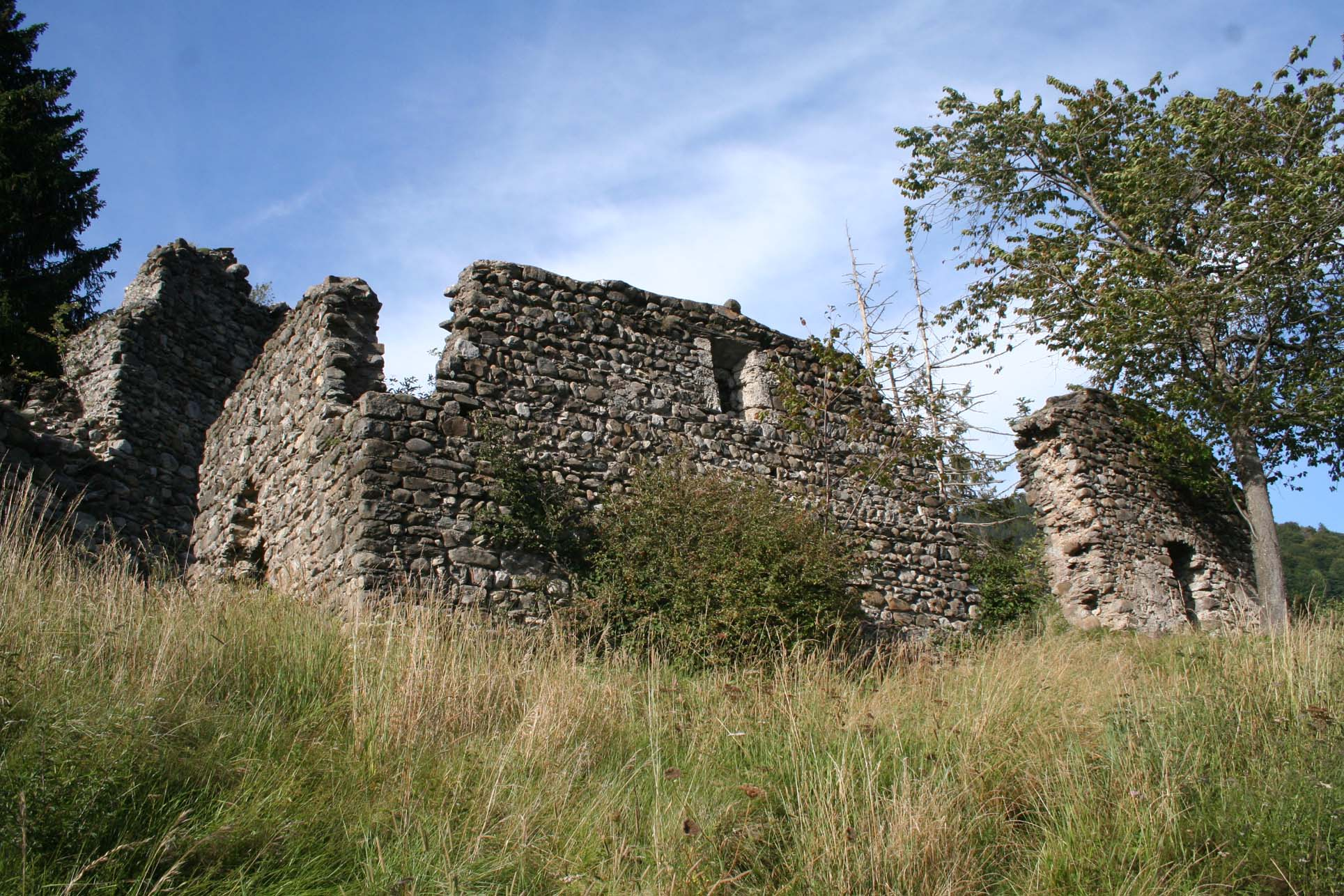
View of the church from the south

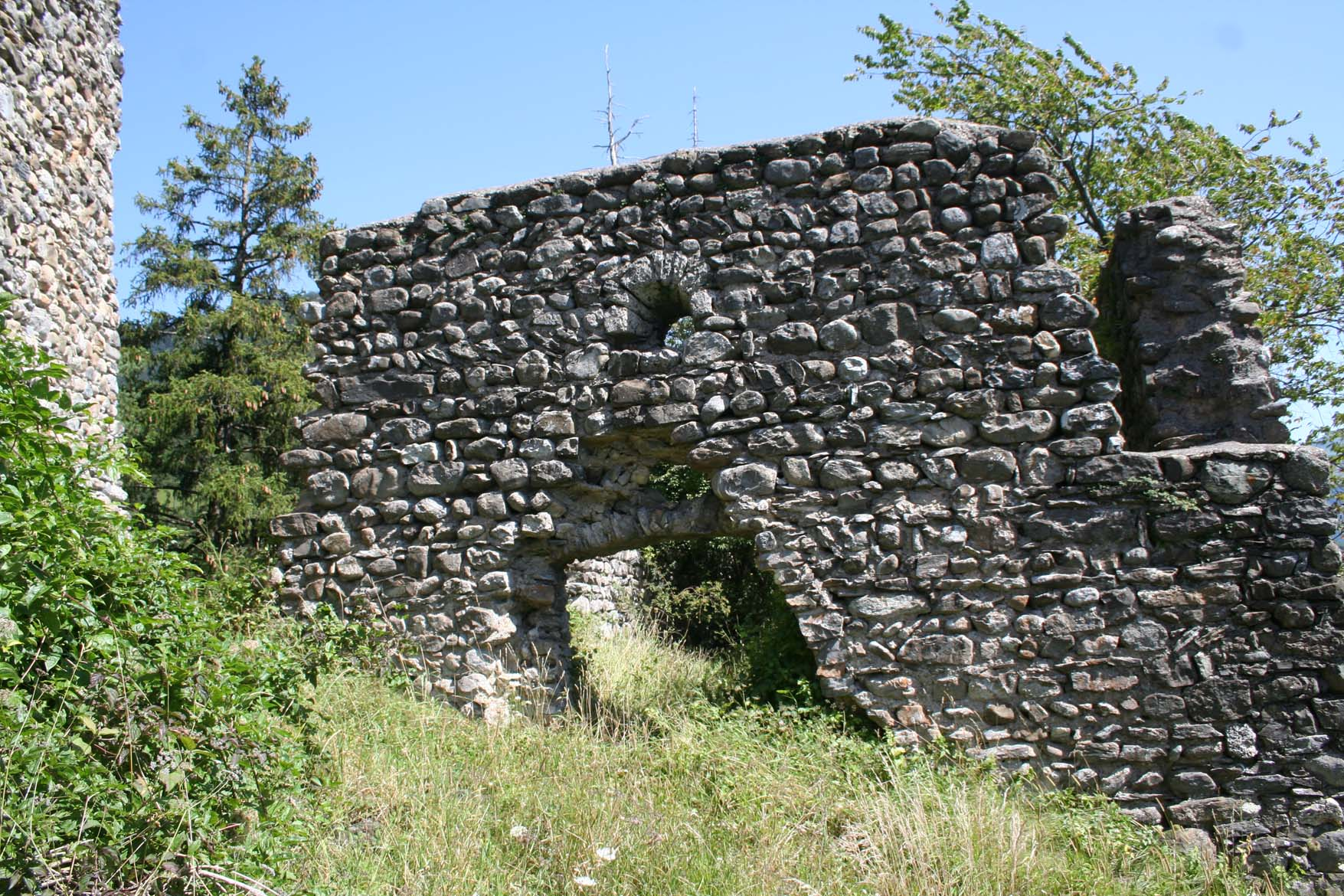
Church entrance

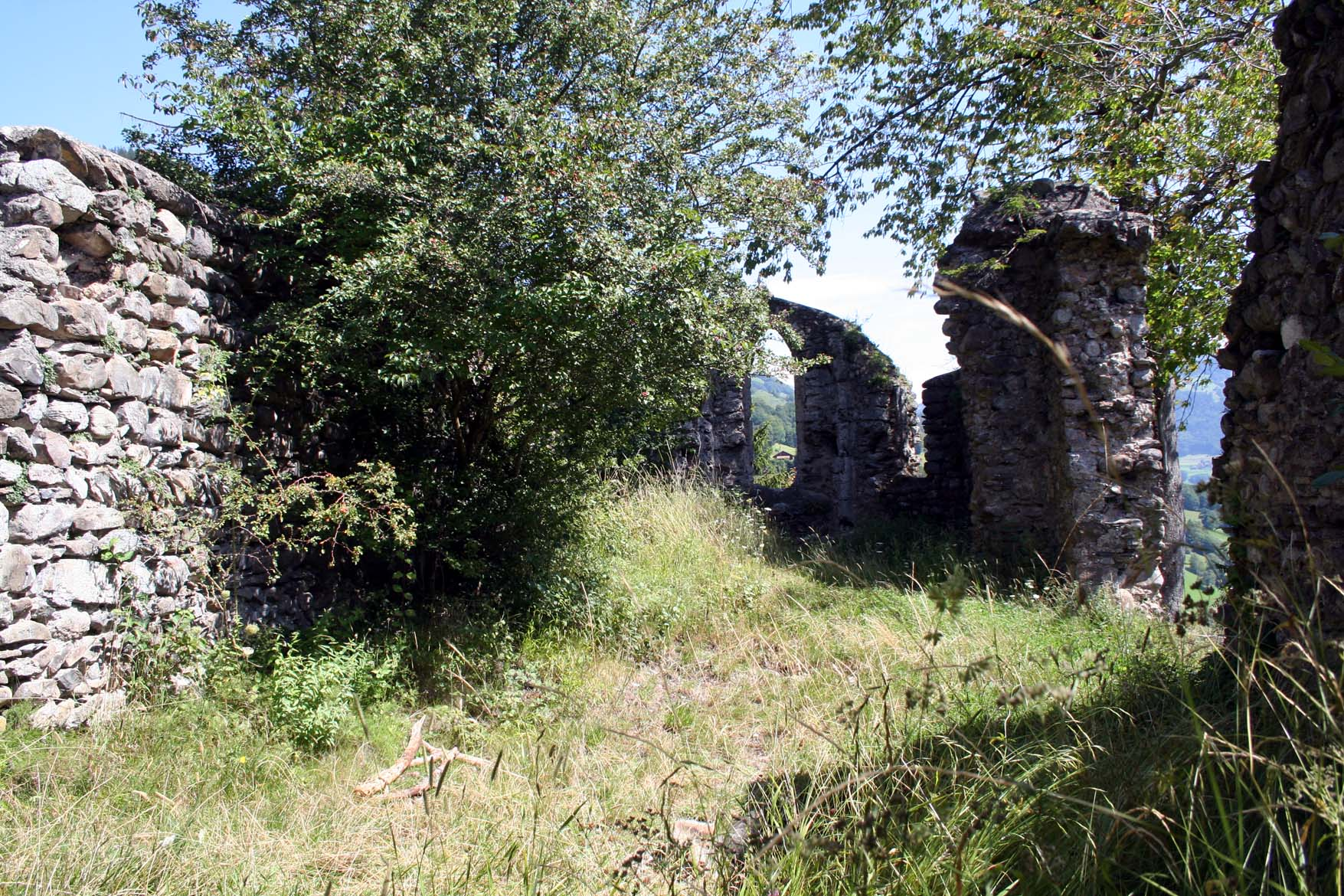
Interior of the church

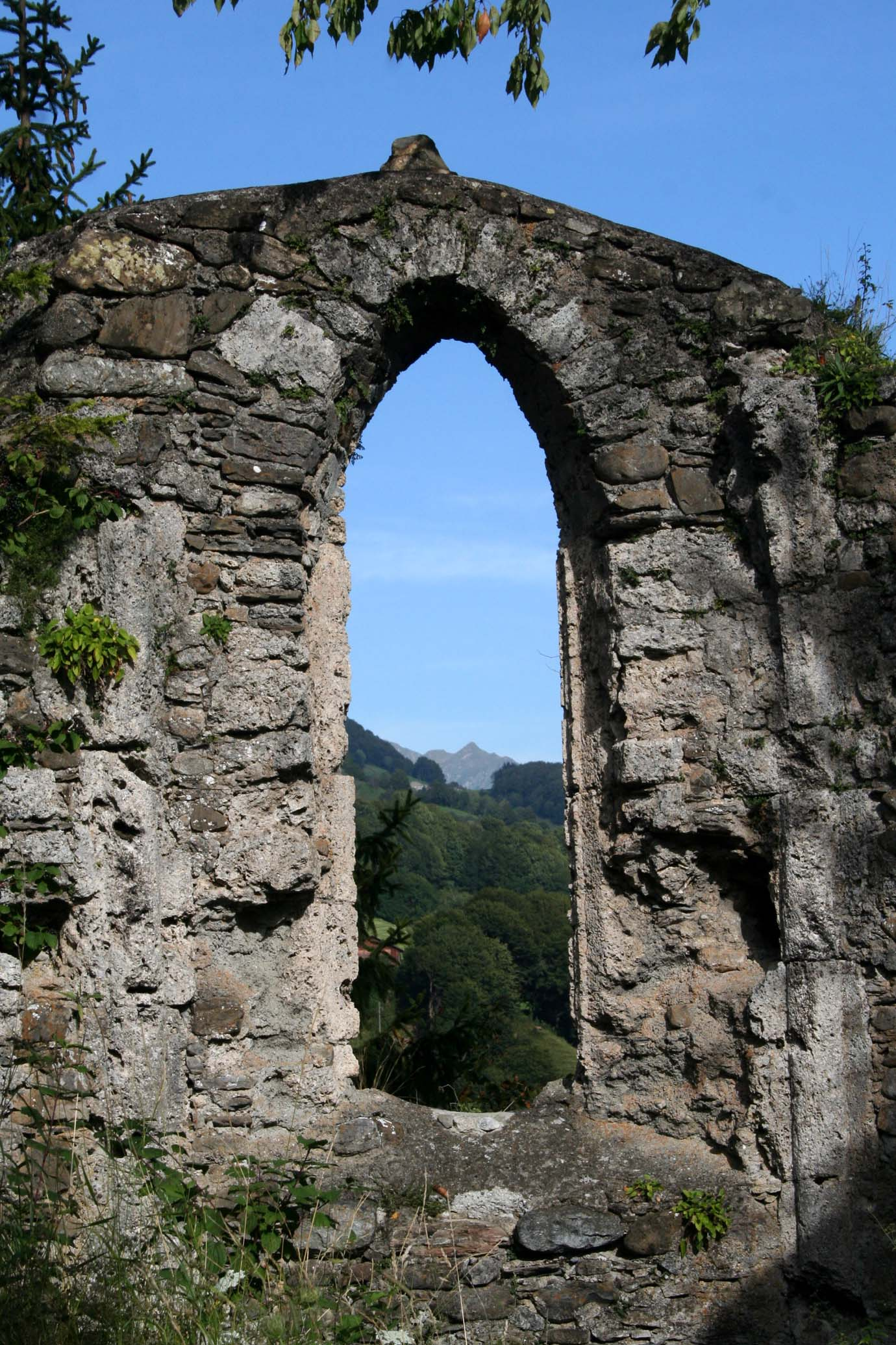
Gothic window in the church

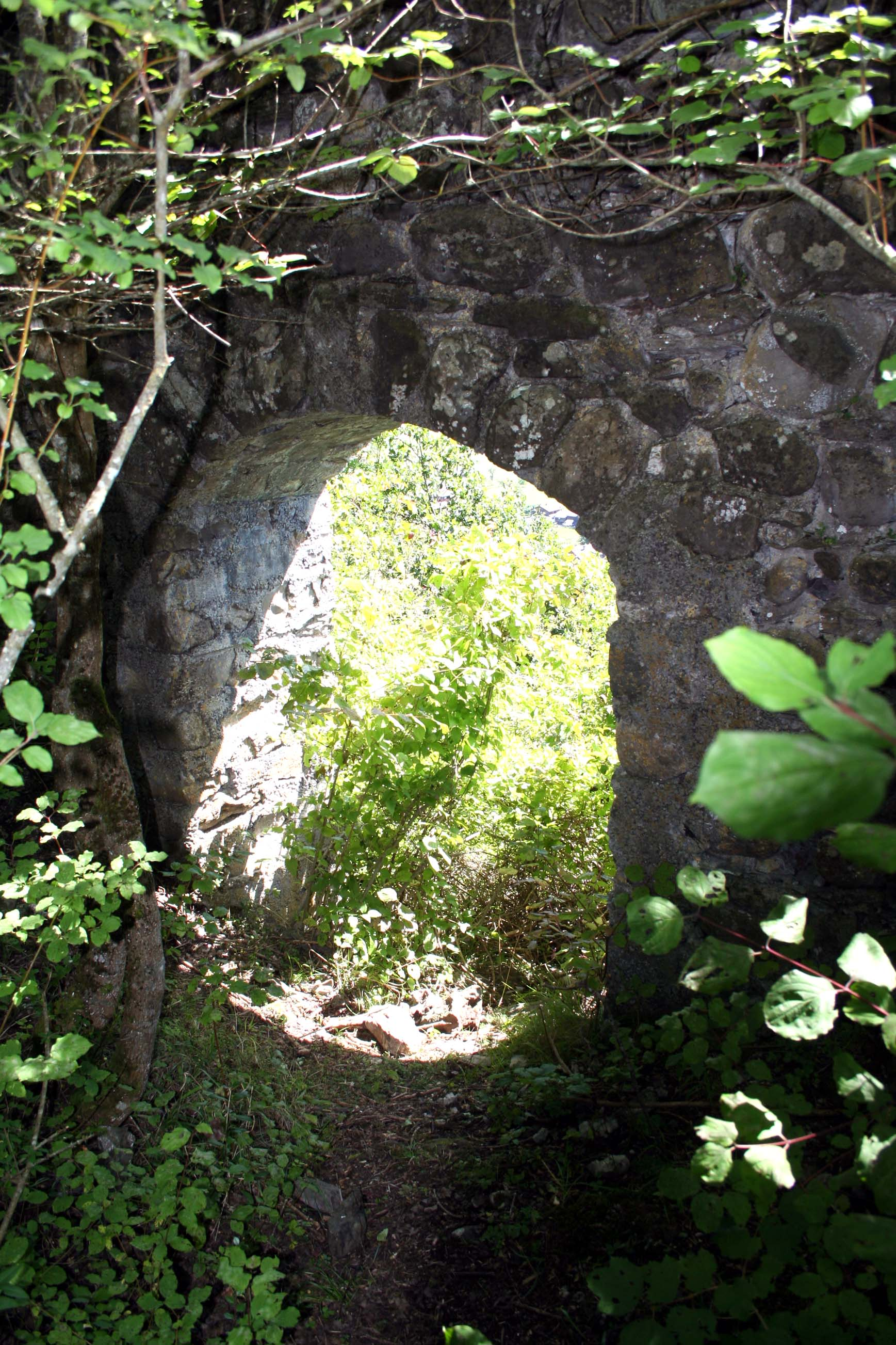
Gate in the south wall

== See also ==
- List of castles in Switzerland
